= List of songs recorded by CNBLUE =

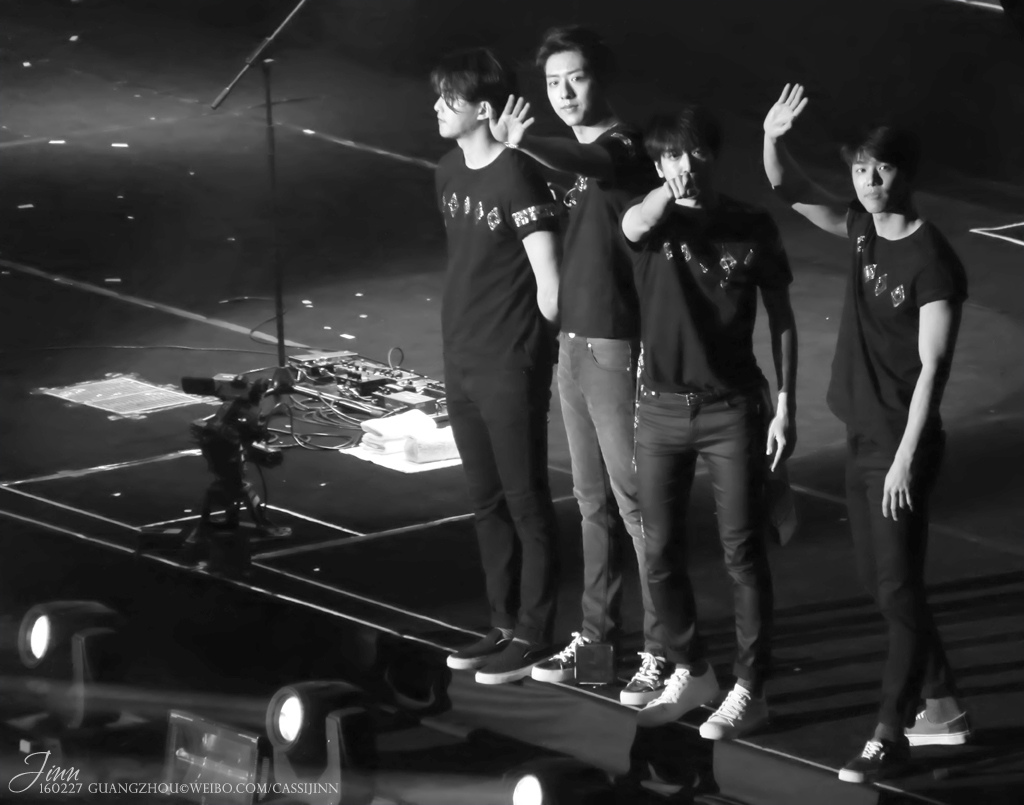
CNBLUE during its Come Together concert tour in Guangzhou, China, 2016

CNBLUE is a South Korean pop-rock band. The quartet made its debut in Japan under AI Entertainment in 2009, where it released its first two independent mini-albums Now or Never and Voice. Written entirely in English, the former contained two songs by frontman Jung Yong-hwa ("Just Please" and "Love Revolution"), while the latter contained one ("Y, Why..."). The band proceeded to debut in its home country under FNC Entertainment with the mini-album Bluetory (2010), in which Jung contributed to the Korean lyrics of two tracks alongside the record label's CEO Han Seong-ho: "Love Revolution" and "Y, Why...". With CNBLUE's followup Bluelove, in addition to the songs penned solely by Jung ("Tattoo" and "Love Light"), drummer Kang Min-hyuk co-wrote "Sweet Holiday" with Han.

In 2011, CNBLUE released its first full-length album First Step in South Korea. Jung wrote or co-wrote five of the songs, while the band as a whole is credited for writing two additional tracks. A month later, the band released the special mini-album First Step +1 Thank You; Jung contributed lyrics to two tracks, while guitarist and vocalist Lee Jong-hyun co-wrote one song. Later that year, CNBLUE released its final independent album 392 in Japan. A majority of the track were written solely by Jung, in addition to Lee's singular contribution. The release of mini-album Ear Fun (2012) saw Jung aid in the songwriting on three out of six tracks. In the band's first studio album Code Name Blue (2012) under Warner Music Japan, Jung wrote or co-wrote seven of the album's tracks.

With the release of Re:Blue (2013), "I'm Sorry" marked the first time Jung contributed to the lyrics of a lead single in South Korea. With the exception of one song, he also wrote the remaining tracks on the record. Since the release of What Turns You On? later that year, nearly all songs have been entirely written or co-written by Jung and Lee. The exceptions had lyrics provided by bassist Lee Jung-shin.

== Songs ==
List of songs recorded by CNBLUE
Song	Writer(s)	Original release	Language	Year	Ref.
"a.ri.ga.tou." ("Thank You")	CUL	ThankU	Japanese	2010	
"a.ri.ga.tou." ("Thank You")	CNBLUE	First Step	Korean	2011	
"Angel"	Jung Yong-hwa	Wave	English	2014	
"Be My Love"	Lee Jong-hyun	"Puzzle"	English	2016	
"Be OK"	Lee Jong-hyun	Euphoria	English	2016	
"Between Us"	Jung Yong-hwa; Hang Seong-ho; Kim I-na	7°CN	Korean	2017	
"Black Flower"	Han Seong-ho	Bluelove	Korean	2010	
"Blessed"	Lee Jong-hyun	Euphoria	English	2016	
"Blind Love"	Lee Jong-hyun	"Blind Love"	Japanese	2013	
"Blind Love"	Lee Jong-hyun; Lee Hee-seung	Present	Korean	2013	
"Blue Sky"	Kosuke Oba	Code Name Blue	English	2012	
"Boku ni Kite Kureru Kana"		FNC Kingdom in Japan	Korean	2014	
"Book"	Jung Yong-hwa	"Stay Gold"	English	2017	
"Butterfly"	Jung Yong-hwa; Hasegawa	"Stay Gold"	Japanese	2017	
"Calling You"	Lee Jong-hyun	7°CN	Korean	2017	
"Can't Stop"	Jung Yong-hwa; Heaven Light	Can't Stop	Korean	2014	
"Captivate"	Lee Jong-hyun	"Stay Gold"	English	2017	
"Catch Me"	Jung Yong-hwa	2gether	Korean	2015	
"Change"	Jung Yong-hwa	What Turns You On?	English	2013	
"Cinderella"	Jung Yong-hwa	2gether	Korean	2015	
"Cinderella"	—N/a	"Cinderella"	Chinese	2015	
"Cinderella (Remix DJ Friz)"	Jung Yong-hwa	"Cinderella Remix"	Korean	2015	
"Cinderella (Remix Seotter)"	Jung Yong-hwa	"Cinderella Remix"	Korean	2015	
"Coffee Shop"	Jung Yong-hwa; Ophelia	Re:Blue	Korean	2013	
"Cold Love"	Jung Yong-hwa	Can't Stop	Korean	2014	
"Come On"	Jung Yong-hwa; Kenji Tamai	"Come On"	Japanese	2012	
"Come On"	Jung Yong-hwa; Lee Hee-seung	Present	Korean	2013	
"Control"	Jung Yong-hwa	"Go Your Way"	English	2014	
"Control"	Lee Jung-shin	2gether	Korean	2015	
"Coward"	CUL	392	Japanese	2011	
"Crying Out"	Lee Jong-hyun	What Turns You On?	English	2013	
"Daisy"	Lee Jung-shin	Colors	English	2015	
"Diamond Girl"	Jung Yong-hwa	Can't Stop	Korean	2014	
"Domino" (featuring Wheein of Mamamoo)	Jung Yong-hwa	2gether	Korean	2015	
"Don't Care"	Jung Yong-hwa	"Lady"	English	2013	
"Don't Say Good Bye"	Jung Yong-hwa	"Re-maintenance"	English	2011	
"Don't Say Good Bye"	Han Seong-ho	First Step +1 Thank You	Korean	2011	
"Dream Boy"	Han Seong-ho	Ear Fun	Korean	2012	
"Drunken Night"	Lee Jong-hyun	2gether	Korean	2015	
"Every Time"	Lee Jong-hyun	Euphoria	English	2016	
"Face to Face"	Jung Yong-hwa	Euphoria	English	2016	
"Feel Good"	Jung Yong-hwa; Han Seong-ho; Twoface	"Galaxy Music"	Korean	2013	
"Feeling"	Jung Yong-hwa	"Where You Are"	English	2012	
"Foxy"	Lee Jong-hyun; Kosuke Oba	Wave	Japanese	2014	
"Friday"	Jung Yong-hwa; Han Seong-ho	"Friday"	Korean	2012	
"Get Away"	Nozomi Maezawa; Agehasprings	"Where You Are"	Japanese	2012	
"Glory Days"	Jung Yong-hwa	Euphoria	Japanese	2016	
"Go Your Way"	Jung Yong-hwa miwa	"Go Your Way"	Japanese	2014	
"Greedy Man"	Jung Yong-hwa	"Blind Love"	English	2013	
"Greedy Man"	Jung Yong-hwa	Present	Korean	2013	
"Have a Good Night"	Jung Yong-hwa	Code Name Blue	English	2012	
"Heart Song" ("Footsteps")	Lee Jong-hyun	"Truth"	English	2014	
"Heart Song" ("Footsteps")	Lee Jong-hyun	2gether	Korean	2015	
"Hero"	Lee Jong-hyun	2gether	Korean	2015	
"Hey You"	Han Seong-ho	Ear Fun	Korean	2012	
"Hide and Seek"	Jung Yong-hwa	2gether	Korean	2015	
"Hold Me"	Jung Yong-hwa	Colors	English	2015	
"Hold My Hand" ("Hold My Hands")	Jung Yong-hwa	2gether	Korean	2015	
"Hold My Hand" ("Hold My Hands")	Jung Yong-hwa	Colors	Japanese	2015	
"Holiday"	Jung Yong-hwa	Colors	English	2015	
"How Awesome"	Lee Jong-hyun	Wave	English	2014	
"I Can't Believe"	Lee Jong-hyun	What Turns You On?	English	2013	
"I Can't Believe"	Lee Jong-hyun; Lee Hee-seung	Present	Korean	2013	
"I Don't Know Why"	Jung Yong-hwa	"I Don't Know Why"	English	2010	
"I Don't Know Why"	Jung Yong-hwa; Han Seong-ho	First Step	Korean	2011	
"I'm a Loner"	Han Seong-ho; Aman	Bluetory	Korean	2010	
"I'm Sorry"	Jung Yong-hwa; Han Seong-ho	Re:Blue	Korean	2013	
"Illusion"	Lee Jong-hyun; CUL	392	English	2011	
"Imagine"	Han Seong-ho; Jung Yong-hwa	First Step	Korean	2011	
"In My Head"	Kenji Tamai; Yoshifumi Kanamaru	"In My Head"	Japanese	2011	
"In My Head"	Jung Yong-hwa	Ear Fun	Korean	2012	
"Intro"	—N/a	ThankU	—N/a	2010	
"Intro"	—N/a	Wave	English	2014	
"Intro"	—N/a	Colors	—N/a	2015	
"Intro 02"	—N/a	Code Name Blue	—N/a	2012	
"Intuition"	Han Seong-ho	First Step	Korean	2011	
"Irony"	Lee Jong-hyun; Ryo	"White"	English	2015	
"It's You"	Jung Yong-hwa; Justin Reinstein	7°CN	Korean	2017	
"Just Please"	Jung Yong-hwa	Now or Never	English	2009	
"Just Please"	Jung Yong-hwa	First Step	Korean	2011	
"Kimio" ("Yes")	CUL	"Re-Maintenance"	Japanese	2011	
"Kimio" ("Yes")	Lee Jong-hyun; Han Seong-ho	First Step +1 Thank You	Korean	2011	
"Let's Go Crazy"	Shusui; Family Business	Now or Never	English	2009	
"Lie"	CUL	"I Don't Know Why"	Japanese	2010	
"Lie"	Kim Jae-yang	First Step	Korean	2011	
"La La La"	Jung Yong-hwa	Re:Blue	Korean	2013	
"Lady"	Jung Yong-hwa; Kosuke Oba	"Lady"	Japanese	2013	
"Lady"	Jung Yong-hwa	Present	Korean	2013	
"Let Me Know"	Jung Yong-hwa	What Turns You On?	English	2013	
"Let Me Know"	Jung Yong-hwa; Lee Hee-seung	Present	Korean	2013	
"Like a Child"	Jung Yong-hwa	Can't Stop	Korean	2014	
"Lonely Night"	Jung Yong-hwa	Wave	English	2014	
"Love"	Han Seong-ho	Bluelove	Korean	2010	
"Love Girl"	Jung Yong-hwa; Han Seong-ho	First Step	Korean	2011	
"Love Girl (New Version)"	Jung Yong-hwa; Han Seong-ho	First Step +1 Thank You	Korean	2011	
"Love Is..."	Jung Yong-hwa	Can't Stop	Korean	2014	
"Love Light"	Jung Yong-hwa	Bluelove	Korean	2010	
"Love Revolution"	Jung Yong-hwa	Now or Never	English	2009	
"Love Revolution"	Jung Yong-hwa; Han Seong-ho	Bluetory	Korean	2010	
"Lucid Dream"	Lee Jong-hyun	Colors	Japanese	2015	
"Man in Front of the Mirror"	Jung Yong-hwa	392	English	2011	
"Man Like Me"	Jung Yong-hwa; Han Seong-ho	Re:Blue	Korean	2013	
"Manito"	Lee Jung-shin; Jung Yong-hwa	7°CN	Korean	2017	
"Mirror"	Jung Yong-hwa	"Stay Gold"	English	2017	
"Monday"	Jung Yong-hwa	"Lady"	English	2013	
"Monster"	Lee Jong-hyun	"Go Your Way"	English	2014	
"More than You"	Han Seong-ho; Kim Jae-yang	Re:Blue	Korean	2013	
"Mr. KIA (Know It All)"	Jung Yong-hwa	"In My Head"	English	2011	
"My Miracle"	Jung Yong-hwa	"Come On"	English	2012	
"My Miracle"	Jung Yong-hwa; Lee Seung-ho	Present	Korean	2013	
"My World"	Jung Yong-hwa	Colors	English	2015	
"Never Too Late"	CUL	Voice	English	2009	
"No More"	Jung Yong-hwa	Code Name Blue	English	2012	
"Now or Never"	Shusui; Family Business	Now or Never	English	2009	
"Now or Never"	Shusui; Family Business	Bluetory	Korean	2010	
"One of Kind"	Shusui; Mattias Hakansson	Voice	English	2009	
"Only Beauty"	Lee Jong-hyun	"Stay Gold"	Japanese	2017	
"One More Time"	Jung Yong-hwa; Kosuke Oba	What Turns You On?	Japanese	2013	
"One More Time"	Jung Yong-hwa	Present	Korean	2013	
"Paradise"	Lee Jong-hyun	Wave	English	2014	
"Puzzle"	Jung Yong-hwa; Hasegawa	"Puzzle"	Japanese	2016	
"Radio"	Jung Yong-hwa miwa	Wave	Japanese	2014	
"Radio"	Jung Yong-hwa	2gether	Korean	2015	
"Rain of Blessing"	Kenji Tamai; Kaori Fukano; Keisuke	"In My Head"	English	2011	
"Realize"	Jung Yong-hwa	Colors	English	2015	
"Ring"	Jung Yong-hwa	"Robot"	English	2012	
"Robot"	Jung Yong-hwa; Kosuke Oba	"Robot"	Japanese	2012	
"Robot"	Jung Yong-hwa; Kosuke Oba	What Turns You On?	English	2013	
"Robot"	Jung Yong-hwa; Lee Hee-seung	Present	Korean	2013	
"Rock n' Roll"	Han Seong-ho; Jung Yong-hwa	Ear Fun	Korean	2012	
"Roller Coaster"	Jung Yong-hwa	2gether	Korean	2015	
"Royal Rumble"	Jung Yong-hwa miwa	Euphoria	Japanese	2016	
"Royal Rumble"	Jung Yong-hwa miwa	7°CN	Korean	2017	
"Run"	Han Seong-ho	Ear Fun	Korean	2012	
"Ryu Can Do It"	Jung Yong-hwa	"Ryu Can Do It"	English	2014	
"The Seasons"	Lee Jong-hyun; Kim Jae-yang	Blueming	Korean	2016	
"Seeds"	Lee Jong-hyun	"Stay Gold"	English	2017	
"Shake"	Jung Yong-hwa	"Shake"	Japanese	2017	
"Slaves"	Lee Jong-hyun	Euphoria	English	2016	
"Sleepless Night"	Lee Jong-hyun; Heaven Light	Can't Stop	Korean	2014	
"Someone Else"	Jung Yong-hwa; Han Seung-hoon	"Shake"	English	2017	
"Starlit Night"	Lee Jong-hyun	"Robot"	English	2012	
"Starting Over"	Jung Yong-hwa	"Stay Gold"	Japanese	2017	
"Stay Sober"	Jung Yong-hwa	"White"	English	2015	
"Stay with Me"	Lee Jung-shin; Ume	Euphoria	Japanese	2016	
"Still"	Jung Yong-hwa miwa	"Truth"	Japanese	2014	
"Still in Love"	Han Seong-ho; Kim Jae-yang; Jung Yong-hwa	Ear Fun	Korean	2012	
"Supernova"	Jung Yong-hwa; Takashi Ogawa	Colors	Japanese	2015	
"Sweet Holiday"	Han Seong-ho; Kang Min-hyuk	Bluelove	Korean	2010	
"Take Me Higher"	Jung Yong-hwa; Takashi Ogawa	"Puzzle"	Japanese	2016	
"Tattoo"	Jung Yong-hwa	Bluelove	Korean	2010	
"Teardrops in the Rain" ("I Will... Forget You...")	Shusui; Thomas G'son	Now or Never	English	2009	
"Teardrops in the Rain" ("I Will... Forget You...")	Shusui; Thomas G'son	Bluetory	Korean	2010	
"These Days"	Kosuke Oba	Code Name Blue	Japanese	2012	
"This Is"	Jung Yong-hwa	"Stay Gold"	Japanese	2017	
"Time Is Over"	Jung Yong-hwa; Kosuke Oba	Code Name Blue	Japanese	2012	
"Time Is Over"	Jung Yong-hwa; Lee Hee-seung	Present	Korean	2013	
"Truth"	Jung Yong-hwa miwa	"Truth"	Japanese	2014	
"Try Again, Smile Again"	Jung Yong-hwa	"Re-Maintenance"	English	2011	
"Try Again, Smile Again"	Jung Yong-hwa; Han Seong-ho	First Step +1 Thank You	Korean	2011	
"Voice"	Daichi	Voice	Japanese	2009	
"Wake Up"	Jung Yong-hwa	"Come On"	English	2012	
"Wanna Be Like U"	Shusui; Tony Nilsson	Voice	English	2009	
"Wanna Be Like U"	First Step	Korean	2011		
"Was So Perfect"	Lee Jong-hyun	"Shake"	English	2017	
"The Way Part 1 (One Time)" ("One Time")	Jung Yong-hwa	"The Way"	English	2010	
"The Way Part 1 (One Time)" ("One Time")	Jung Yong-hwa	First Step	Korean	2011	
"The Way Part 2 (Ready N Go)" ("Ready N Go")	Jung Yong-hwa	"The Way"	English	2010	
"The Way Part 2 (Ready N Go)" ("Ready N Go")	Han Seong-ho; Jung Yong-hwa	First Step	Korean	2011	
"The Way Part 3 (Eclipse)" ("Love Follows the Rain")	CUL	"The Way"	Japanese	2010	
"The Way Part 3 (Eclipse)" ("Love Follows the Rain")	Han Seong-ho	First Step	Korean	2011	
"When I Was Young"	Lee Jong-hyun	7°CN	Korean	2017	
"Where You Are"	Jung Yong-hwa; Kenji Tamai	"Where You Are"	Japanese	2012	
"Where You Are"	Jung Yong-hwa	Code Name Blue	English	2012	
"White"	Lee Jong-hyun; Jung Yong-hwa miwa	"White"	Japanese	2015	
"With Me"	Daichi; Miyakei	Code Name Blue	Japanese	2012	
"With Your Eyes"	Lee Jong-hyun	"Blind Love"	English	2013	
"Without You"	Lee Jung-shin; Kim Jae-yang	Blueming	Korean	2016	
"Y, Why..."	Jung Yong-hwa	Voice	English	2009	
"Y, Why..."	Jung Yong-hwa; Han Seong-ho	Bluetory	Korean	2010	
"You're So Fine"	Jung Yong-hwa	Blueming	Korean	2016	
"Young Forever"	Jung Yong-hwa	Blueming	Korean	2016	
