= List of songs written and produced by Jung Yong-hwa =

Jung Yong-hwa is a South Korean musician, singer, songwriter, producer and actor. He is the leader, lead vocalist and rhythm guitarist of the rock band CNBLUE under FNC Entertainment.

== CNBLUE Korean albums ==
Year	Album	Song	Lyrics		Music		Arrangement	
Year	Album	Song	Credited	With	Credited	With	Credited	With
2010	Bluetory	"Love Revolution"	Yes	Han Sung-ho	No	—N/a	No	—N/a
2010	Bluetory	"Y, Why"	Yes	—N/a	Yes	RYO	No	—N/a
2010	Bluelove	"Tattoo"	Yes	—N/a	Yes	Han Seung-hoon	Yes	Han Seung-hoon
2010	Bluelove	"Love Light"	Yes	—N/a	Yes	—N/a	Yes	Kim Jae-yang
2011	First Step	"Love Girl"	Yes	Han Sung-ho	Yes	Han Seung-hoon	Yes	Han Seung-hoon
2011	First Step	"Imagine"	Yes	Han Sung-ho	No	—N/a	No	—N/a
2011	First Step	"I Don't Know Why"	Yes	Han Sung-ho	Yes	Han Seung-hoon	Yes	Han Seung-hoon
2011	First Step	"One Time"	Yes	—N/a	Yes	Han Seung-hoon	Yes	Han Seung-hoon
2011	First Step	"Just Please"	Yes	—N/a	Yes	OWL	No	—N/a
2011	First Step	"Wanna Be Like U"	Yes	CNBLUE	No	—N/a	No	—N/a
2011	First Step	"Ready N Go"	Yes	Han Sung-ho	No	—N/a	No	—N/a
2011	First Step	"Thank You"	Yes	CNBLUE	No	—N/a	No	—N/a
2011	First Step +1 Thank You	"Love Girl"	Yes	Han Sung-ho	Yes	Han Seung-hoon	No	—N/a
2011	First Step +1 Thank You	"Try Again, Smile Again"	Yes	Han Sung-ho	Yes	Han Seung-hoon, Han Sung-ho	No	—N/a
2012	Ear Fun	"Still in Love"	Yes	Han Sung-ho, Kim Jae-yang	Yes	Kim Jae-yang	No	—N/a
2012	Ear Fun	"Dream Boy"	No	—N/a	Yes	Han Sung-ho, Kim Jae-yang	No	—N/a
2012	Ear Fun	"Rock n' Roll"	Yes	Han Sung-ho	Yes	Han Seung-hoon	No	—N/a
2012	Ear Fun	"Run"	No	—N/a	Yes	Han Seung-hoon	No	—N/a
2012	Ear Fun	"In My Head"	Yes	—N/a	Yes	—N/a	No	—N/a
2013	Re:Blue	"I'm Sorry"	Yes	Han Sung-ho	Yes	Han Seung-hoon	No	—N/a
2013	Re:Blue	"Coffee Shop"	Yes	Ophelia	Yes	—N/a	Yes	Han Seung-hoon
2013	Re:Blue	"The Guy Like Me"	Yes	Han Sung-ho	Yes	Han Seung-hoon	Yes	Vinyl House
2013	Re:Blue	"La La La"	Yes	—N/a	Yes	—N/a	Yes	Han Seung-hoon
2013	Re:Blue	"Where You Are" (English Ver.)	Yes	—N/a	Yes	—N/a	No	—N/a
2014	Can't Stop	"Can't Stop"	Yes	Heaven Light	Yes	Heaven Light	No	—N/a
2014	Can't Stop	"Diamond Girl"	Yes	—N/a	Yes	—N/a	Yes	Heaven Light
2014	Can't Stop	"Cold Love"	Yes	—N/a	Yes	—N/a	Yes	Heaven Light
2014	Can't Stop	"Love Is..."	Yes	—N/a	Yes	Heaven Light	Yes	Heaven Light
2014	Can't Stop	"Like A Child"	Yes	—N/a	Yes	—N/a	Yes	Heaven Light
2015	2gether	"Cinderella"	Yes	—N/a	Yes	—N/a	Yes	Lee Sang-ho
2015	2gether	"Hide and Seek"	Yes	—N/a	Yes	—N/a	Yes	Lee Sang-ho
2015	2gether	"Roller Coaster"	Yes	—N/a	Yes	—N/a	Yes	Go Jin-young
2015	2gether	"Domino"	Yes	—N/a	Yes	—N/a	Yes	Go Jin-young
2015	2gether	"Catch Me"	Yes	—N/a	Yes	—N/a	Yes	Park Hyun-woo
2015	2gether	"Hold My Hand"	Yes	—N/a	Yes	—N/a	No	—N/a
2015	2gether	"Control"	No	—N/a	Yes	Han Seung-hoon	No	—N/a
2015	2gether	"Radio"	Yes	—N/a	Yes	Han Seung-hoon	No	—N/a
2016	Blueming	"You're So Fine"	Yes	—N/a	Yes	—N/a	Yes	Ko Jin-yeong, Lee Sang-ho
2016	Blueming	"Young Forever"	Yes	—N/a	Yes	—N/a	Yes	Park Hyun-woo
2016	Blueming	"Stay Sober"	Yes	Innovator	Yes	—N/a	No	—N/a
2017	7°CN	"Between Us"	Yes	Han Sung-ho, Kim I-na	Yes	Justin Reinstein	No	—N/a
2017	7°CN	"It's You"	Yes	Justin Reinstein	Yes	Justin Reinstein	No	—N/a
2017	7°CN	"Manito"	Yes	Lee Jung-shin	No	—N/a	No	—N/a
2017	7°CN	"Royal Rumble"	Yes	miwa	Yes	—N/a	No	—N/a
2020	RECODE	"Then, Now & Forever"	Yes		Yes		Yes	
2020	RECODE	"Till Then"	Yes		Yes	Park Soo-seok, Seo Ji-eun	Yes	Park Soo-seok, Seo Ji-eun
2020	RECODE	"In Time"	Yes	ZUPITER, Seohyun Lee (Flying Lab)	Yes	Simon Petrén	Yes	Simon Petrén
2020	RECODE	"Winter Again"	Yes		Yes	Hyunseung Lee, Jaeyang Kim, TM	Yes	Hyunseung Lee, TM
2020	RECODE	"Blue Stars"	Yes		Yes	Seongho Han, Jinyoung Ko, Moon Kim	Yes	Jinyoung Ko
2021	Wanted	“Love Cut”	Yes		Yes	Kim Dohoon, Lee Hyunseung, TM	No	Kim Dohoon, Lee Hyunseung, TM
2021	Wanted	“99%”	Yes		Yes	Han Seung-hoon, Jinyoung Ko, Jung Jinwook	No	Jinyoung Ko
2021	Wanted	“Nothing”	Yes		Yes	Park Soo-seok, Seo Ji-eun	No	Jinyoung Ko
2021	Wanted	“Time Capsule”	Yes		Yes	Lee Hyunseung, TM	No	Lee Hyuseung, TM

== CNBLUE Japanese albums ==
Year	Album	Song	Lyrics		Music		Arrangement	
Year	Album	Song	Credited	With	Credited	With	Credited	With
2009	Now or Never, Thank U	"Love Revolution"	Yes	Han Sung-ho	No	—N/a	No	—N/a
2009	Now or Never, Thank U	"Just Please"	Yes	—N/a	Yes	OWL	No	—N/a
2009	Voice, Thank U	"Y, Why"	Yes	—N/a	Yes	Ryo	No	—N/a
2010	Thank U	"Intro"	—N/a	—N/a	Yes	—N/a	No	—N/a
2011	392	"The Way" (part 2 ~Ready N Go~)	Yes	—N/a	No	—N/a	No	—N/a
2011	392	"The Way" (part 1 ~One Time~)	Yes	—N/a	Yes	Ryo	No	—N/a
2011	392	"Man In Front of the Mirror"	Yes	—N/a	Yes	Ryo	No	—N/a
2011	392	"Try Again, Smile Again"	Yes	—N/a	Yes	Ryo, Han Sung-ho	No	—N/a
2011	392	"Don't Say Goodbye"	Yes	—N/a	Yes	Ryo	No	—N/a
2011	392	"I Don't Know Why"	Yes	—N/a	Yes	Ryo	Yes	Ryo
2012	Code Name Blue	"Intro 02"	—N/a	—N/a	Yes	—N/a	Yes	—N/a
2012	Code Name Blue	"In My Head"	No	—N/a	Yes	—N/a	No	—N/a
2012	Code Name Blue	"Where You Are"	Yes	Kenji Tamai	Yes	—N/a	No	—N/a
2012	Code Name Blue	"Where You Are" (English Ver.)	Yes	—N/a	Yes	—N/a	No	—N/a
2012	Code Name Blue	"Time is Over"	Yes	Kosuke Oba (Japanese lyrics translator)	Yes	Kosuke Oba	No	—N/a
2012	Code Name Blue	"Have a Good Night"	Yes	—N/a	Yes	—N/a	No	—N/a
2012	Code Name Blue	"Wake Up"	Yes	—N/a	Yes	Ryo	No	—N/a
2012	Code Name Blue	"No More"	Yes	—N/a	Yes	Lee Jong-hyun	No	—N/a
2012	Code Name Blue	"Mr. KIA (Know It All)"	Yes	—N/a	Yes	Ryo	No	—N/a
2012	Code Name Blue	"Come On"	Yes	Kenji Tamai (Japanese lyrics translator)	No	—N/a	No	—N/a
2013	What Turns You On?	"Lady"	Yes	Kosuke Oba	Yes	Park Hyun-woo	No	—N/a
2013	What Turns You On?	"One More Time"	Yes	Kosuke Oba	Yes	Ryo	No	—N/a
2013	What Turns You On?	"Change"	Yes	—N/a	Yes	Ryo, Vinyl House	No	—N/a
2013	What Turns You On?	"Don't Care"	Yes	—N/a	Yes	—N/a	Yes	Ryo
2013	What Turns You On?	"Greedy Man"	Yes	—N/a	Yes	Kim Jae-yang	No	—N/a
2013	What Turns You On?	"Robot"	Yes	Kosuke Oba (Japanese translator)	Yes	Kosuke Oba	No	—N/a
2013	What Turns You On?	"Let Me Know"	Yes	—N/a	Yes	Ryo, Vinyl House	No	—N/a
2014	Wave	"Intro"	—N/a	—N/a	Yes	Lee Jin-ho, Choi Jae-yeol	No	—N/a
2014	Wave	"Radio"	Yes	miwa	Yes	Heaven Light	No	—N/a
2014	Wave	"Go Your Way"	Yes	miwa	Yes	Heaven Light	No	—N/a
2014	Wave	"Truth"	Yes	miwa	Yes	Ryo, Lee Sang-ho	No	—N/a
2014	Wave	"Lonely Night"	Yes	—N/a	Yes	Heaven Light	No	—N/a
2014	Wave	"Still"	Yes	miwa	Yes	Ryo	No	—N/a
2014	Wave	"Angel"	Yes	—N/a	Yes	Heaven Light	No	—N/a
2014	Wave	"Control"	Yes	—N/a	Yes	Heaven Light	No	—N/a
2015	Colors	"Intro"	—N/a	—N/a	Yes	Han Seung-hoon	Yes	Han Seung-hoon, Go Jin-young
2015	Colors	"Supernova"	Yes	Takashi Ogawa	Yes	Han Seung-hoon	No	—N/a
2015	Colors	"White"	Yes	Lee Jong-hyun, miwa	No	—N/a	No	—N/a
2015	Colors	"Holiday" (English Ver.)	Yes	—N/a	Yes	—N/a	No	—N/a
2015	Colors	"Hold My Hands"	Yes	—N/a	Yes	—N/a	No	—N/a
2015	Colors	"Realize" (English Ver.)	Yes	—N/a	Yes	—N/a	No	—N/a
2015	Colors	"Daisy" (English Ver.)	No	—N/a	Yes	Lee Jung-shin	No	—N/a
2015	Colors	"Hold Me" (English Ver.)	Yes	—N/a	Yes	Han Seung-hoon	No	—N/a
2015	Colors	"My World" (English Ver.)	Yes	—N/a	Yes	Han Seung-hoon	No	—N/a
2016	Euphoria	"Glory Days"	Yes	—N/a	Yes	Erik Lidbom, Youwich	No	—N/a
2016	Euphoria	"Take Me Higher"	Yes	Takashi Ogawa	Yes	Han Seung-hoon, Ko Jin-yeong	No	—N/a
2016	Euphoria	"Face to Face"	Yes	—N/a	Yes	Han Seung-hoon	No	—N/a
2016	Euphoria	"Puzzle"	Yes	—N/a	Yes	Han Seung-hoon, Ko Jin-yeong	No	—N/a
2016	Euphoria	"Royal Rumble"	Yes	miwa	Yes	—N/a	No	—N/a
2017	Stay Gold	"Intro"	—N/a	—N/a	Yes	—N/a		
2017	Stay Gold	"Starting Over"	Yes	—N/a	Yes	Han Seung-hoon, Didrik Thott, David Bjork	No	
2017	Stay Gold	"This Is"	Yes	—N/a	Yes	Han Seung-hoon, Erik Lidbom, Simon Janlov, MLC	No	
2017	Stay Gold	"Butterfly"	Yes	Hasegawa	Yes	—N/a	No	
2017	Stay Gold	"Mirror"	Yes	—N/a	Yes	Kim Jie-yang, Bitcrusher, Bob Sacamano	No	
2017	Stay Gold	"Shake"	Yes	—N/a	Yes	Lee Jong-hyun, Albi Albertsson, Justin Reinstein	No	
2017	Stay Gold	"Someone Else"	Yes	Han Seung-hoon	Yes	Han Seung-hoon	No	
2017	Stay Gold	"Book"	Yes	—N/a	Yes	Han Seung-hoon, Albi Albertsson, Justin Reinstein	No	

== Solo albums ==
Year	Album	Song	Lyrics		Music		Arrangement	
Year	Album	Song	Credited	With	Credited	With	Credited	With
2015	One Fine Day	"Intro"	—N/a		Yes	Two Face	No	—N/a
2015	One Fine Day	"One Fine Day"	Yes	—N/a	Yes	Two Face	No	—N/a
2015	One Fine Day	"Cruel Memories"	Yes	Yoon Do-hyun	Yes	Han Seul-pun, Go Jin-young	Yes	Go Jin-young, Park Hyun-woo
2015	One Fine Day	"Energy"	Yes	Verbal Jint	Yes	Verbal Jint	Yes	Verbal Jint
2015	One Fine Day	"Mileage"	Yes	YDG	Yes	—N/a	Yes	Go Jin-young
2015	One Fine Day	"Checkmate"	Yes	JJ Lin	Yes	—N/a	Yes	Lee Sang-ho
2015	One Fine Day	"Without You"	Yes	—N/a	Yes	—N/a	Yes	Han Seung-hun
2015	One Fine Day	"Last Leaf"	Yes	—N/a	Yes	Go Jin-young, Park Hyun-woo	Yes	Go Jin-young, Park Hyun-woo
2015	One Fine Day	"Goodnight Lover"	Yes	—N/a	Yes	—N/a	Yes	Kim Jae-yang
2015	One Fine Day	"27 Years"	Yes	Peter Malick	Yes	Peter Malick	Yes	Peter Malick, Francis Sooho Kim
2015	One Fine Day	"You, My Star"	Yes	—N/a	Yes	Han Seung-hoon, Go Jin-young	No	—N/a
2015	Aru Suteki na Hi: Japan Special Edition	"I'm Glad I Came to Like You"	No	—N/a	Yes	—N/a		
2017	Do Disturb	"That Girl" (여자여자해; Yeojayeojahae) (featuring Loco)	Yes	Loco	Yes	TJ Routon, Jarah Gibson of 80HDMuzik	No	TJ Routon
2017	Do Disturb	"Closer" (딱 붙어; Ttak Buteo)	Yes	—N/a	Yes	Justin Reinstein	No	Justin Reinstein
2017	Do Disturb	"Password"	Yes	—N/a	Yes	Peter Wallevik, Carl Altino	No	Peter Wallevik, Carl Altino
2017	Do Disturb	"Navigation"	Yes	—N/a	Yes	—N/a	No	Kim Chang-nak
2017	Do Disturb	"Not Anymore" (대답하지 마; Daedaphaji Ma)	Yes	—N/a	Yes	—N/a	No	Kim Jin-wook
2017	Do Disturb	"Lost in Time" (널 잊는 시간 속; Neol Inneun Sigan Sok)	Yes	—N/a	Yes	—N/a	No	Kim Jin-wook
2017	Summer Calling	"Intro"	—N/a	—N/a	Yes	—N/a	Yes	
2017	Summer Calling	"Summer Dream"	Yes	—N/a	Yes	Justin Reinstein	No	Justin Reinstein
2017	Summer Calling	"Make You Mine"	Yes	—N/a	Yes	Justin Reinstein	No	Justin Reinstein
2017	Summer Calling	"Life Is A Party"	Yes	—N/a	No	Erik Lidbom, Jimmy Burney, Andreas Oberg	No	Erik Labdom
2023	Your City	“Your City”	Yes	Soyoon	Yes	Jacob Aaron(THE HUB), ELCAPITXN, Vendors(Louis)	No	ELCAPITXN, Vendors(Louis)
2023	Your City	“Pain Healer”	Yes	Soyoon	Yes	Jacob Aaron(THE HUB), Ayushy(THE HUB), Slyberry, Jinyoung Ko, Rapid, kim Taeyang	No	Jinyoung Ko, Slyberry, Rapid
2023	Your City	“On Your Time”	Yes	Realmeee	Yes	Lee Seunghyun, TM	No	Lee Seunghyun, TM
2023	Your City	“Small Talk”	Yes	Soyoon	Yes	Jacob Aaron(THE HUB), ELCAPITXN, Vendors(Zenur)	No	ELCAPITXN, Vendors(Zenur)
2023	Your City	“Season of Love”	Yes		Yes	Benjmn, Nathan Cunningham, Marc Sibley	No	Space Primates
2023	Your City	“Note to Self”	Yes	Soyoon	Yes	Max Song, The Aristocrats	No	The Aristocrats

== Other work ==
Year	Album	Song	Lyrics		Music		Arrangement	
Year	Album	Song	Credited	With	Credited	With	Credited	With
2011	Non-album single	"For First Time Lovers"	Yes	Han Seung-hoon	Yes	—N/a	Yes	—N/a
2011	Heartstrings OST	"Because I Miss You"	No	—N/a	Yes	Han Seung-hoon	No	—N/a
2012	My First June, JUNI	"Fool"	No	—N/a	Yes	—N/a	No	—N/a
2012	AOA:Angels Story	"Love Is Only You"	Yes	—N/a	Yes	Han Seung-Ho	No	—N/a
2013	Non-album singles	"Friday"	Yes	—N/a	Yes	HnK	No	—N/a
2013	Non-album singles	"School Song"	Yes	Yes	—N/a			—N/a
2013	Non-album singles	"Feel Good"	Yes	Han Sung-ho, Two Face	Yes	Han Sung-ho, Two Face	No	—N/a
2013	Non-album singles	Marry Him If You Dare "Casting Love"	No	—N/a	Yes	Han Seung-hoon, Vinyl House	—N/a	—N/a
2014	Non-album singles	"Star, You"	Yes	Yes	—N/a	—N/a		—N/a
2016	Non-album singles	"Hello"	Yes	Sunwoo Jung-a	—N/a	Yes	No	—N/a
2016	Non-album singles	"Fireworks"	Yes	Sunwoo Jung-a	Yes	Sunwoo Jung-a	No	—N/a
2018	AOA : ' 'Bingle Bangle' '	"Ladi Dadi"	Yes	Shin Ji-min	No			
