= CNBLUE discography =

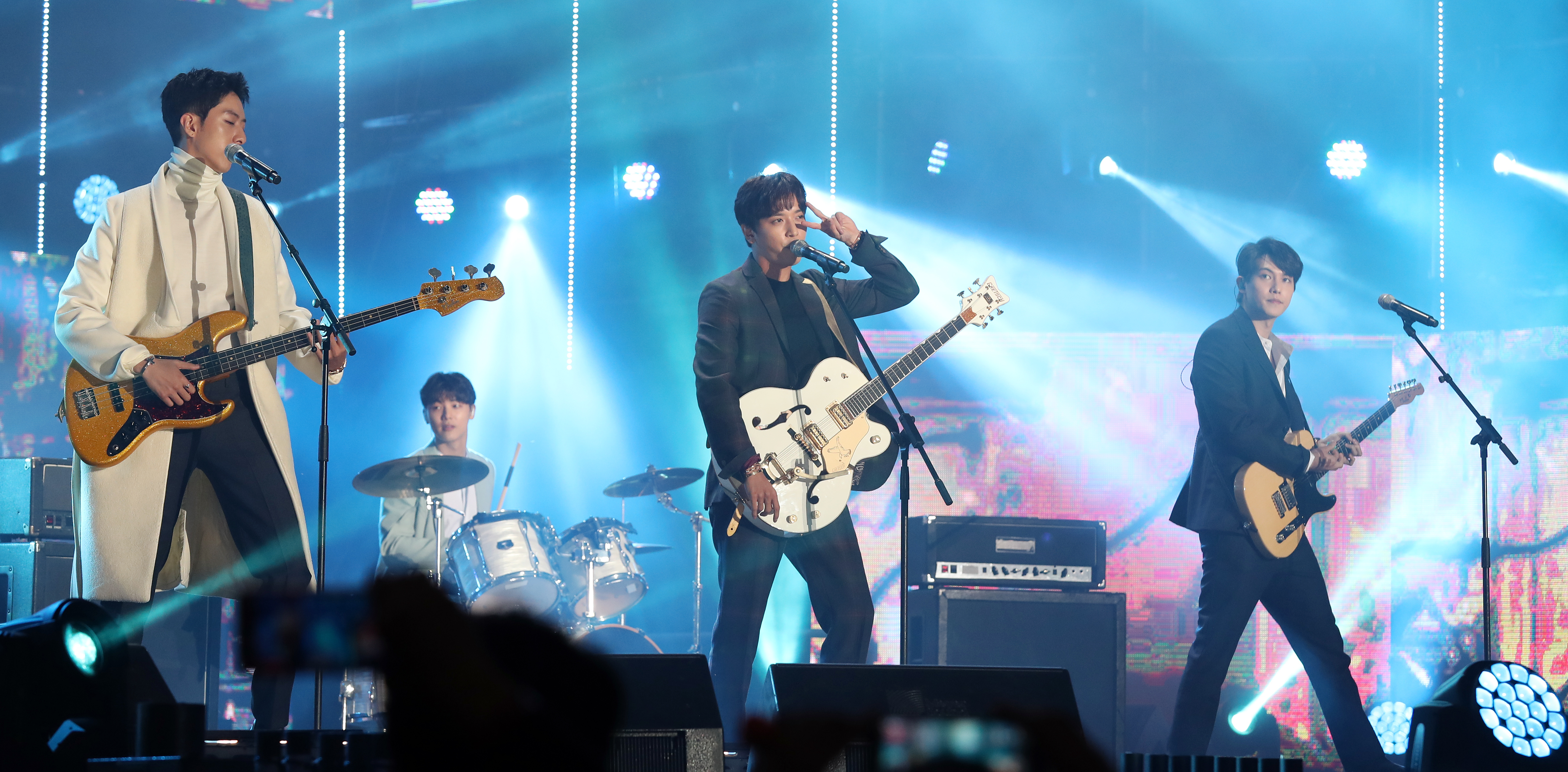
- CNBLUE at Korea Sale Festa, 2016
- Studio albums: 13
- Extended plays: 15
- Compilation albums: 3
- Singles: 33
- Video albums: 9
- Music videos: 29

The discography of CNBLUE, a South Korean rock band, consists of 13 studio albums, 15 extended plays (EPs), 33 singles, three compilation albums, nine video albums, and 29 music videos released in its home country and Japan.

Formed in 2009, the quartet debuted as an indie band in Japan with its mini album Now or Never and debuted in 2010 with Bluetory in South Korea. In October 2011 they had their major debut in Japan with single "In My Head".

== Albums ==
=== Studio albums ===
==== Korean albums ====
| Title | Album details | Peak chart positions | | | Sales |
| Title | Album details | KOR | JPN | US World | Sales |
|---|---|---|---|---|---|
| First Step | Released: March 21, 2011; Label: FNC Entertainment; Formats: CD, digital download | 1 | 16 | — | KOR: 134,732 |
| 2gether | Released: September 14, 2015; Label: FNC Entertainment; Formats: CD, digital download | 1 | 14 | 3 | KOR: 82,789; JPN: 6,785 |
| 3Logy | Released: January 7, 2026; Label: FNC Entertainment; Formats: CD, digital download | 5 | 27 | — | KOR: 34,327; JPN: 1,028 |
"—" denotes releases that did not chart or were not released in that region.

==== Japanese albums ====
| Title | Album details | Peak chart positions | | Sales |
| Title | Album details | KOR | JPN | Sales |
|---|---|---|---|---|
| Thank U | Released: March 20, 2010; Label: AI Entertainment; Formats: CD, digital download | — | 90 | JPN: 10,237 |
| 392 | Released: September 1, 2011; Label: AI Entertainment; Formats: CD, digital download | — | 6 | JPN: 26,642 |
| Code Name Blue | Released: August 29, 2012; Label: Warner Music Japan; Formats: CD, digital download | 33 | 1 | JPN: 57,744; KOR: 495 |
| What Turns You On? | Released: August 28, 2013; Label: Warner Music Japan; Formats: CD, digital download | — | 2 | JPN: 52,989 |
| Wave | Released: September 17, 2014; Label: Warner Music Japan; Formats: CD, digital download | — | 3 | JPN: 42,080 |
| Colors | Released: September 30, 2015; Label: Warner Music Japan; Formats: CD, digital download | — | 1 | JPN: 35,897 |
| Euphoria | Released: October 19, 2016; Label: Warner Music Japan; Formats: CD, digital download | — | 2 | JPN: 36,324 |
| Stay Gold | Released: October 18, 2017; Label: Warner Music Japan; Formats: CD, digital download | — | 3 | JPN: 30,778 |
| Pleasures | Released: October 25, 2023; Label: Warner Music Japan; Formats: CD, digital download | — | 3 | JPN: 12,004 |
| Full Circle | Released: October 21, 2026; Label: Warner Music Japan; Formats: CD, digital download | — | 8 | JPN: 15,329 |
"—" denotes releases that did not chart or were not released in that region.

=== Compilation albums ===
| Title | Album details | Peak chart positions | | Sales |
| Title | Album details | KOR | JPN | Sales |
|---|---|---|---|---|
| Present | Released: November 26, 2013; Label: FNC Entertainment; Language: Korean | 3 | — | KOR: 36,507 |
| Korea Best Album 'Present' | Released: February 5, 2014; Label: Warner Music Japan; Language: Korean | — | 2 | JPN: 25,544 |
| Best of CNBLUE / Our Book (2011–2018) | Released: August 29, 2018; Label: Warner Music Japan; Language: Japanese | — | 6 | JPN: 19,952 |
"—" denotes releases that did not chart or were not released in that region.

== Extended plays ==
=== Korean EPs ===
| Title | Details | Peak chart positions | | | | Sales | Certifications |
| Title | Details | KOR | JPN | TWN | US World | Sales | Certifications |
|---|---|---|---|---|---|---|---|
| Bluetory | Released: January 14, 2010; Label: FNC Entertainment; Formats: CD, digital download | 1 | 93 | 5 | — | KOR: 219,402; TWN: 20,000; JPN: 45,607 | TWN: Platinum |
| Bluelove | Released: May 19, 2010; Label: FNC Entertainment; Formats: CD, digital download | 3 | 112 | 4 | — | KOR: 161,133; TWN: 20,000; JPN: 31,542 | TWN: Platinum |
| First Step +1 Thank You | Released: April 26, 2011; Label: FNC Entertainment; Formats: CD, digital download | 1 | 53 | 4 | — | KOR: 231,447; JPN: 23,773 | |
| Ear Fun | Released: March 26, 2012; Label: FNC Entertainment; Formats: CD, digital download | 1 | 15 | 5 | — | KOR: 122,515; JPN: 24,765 | |
| Re:Blue | Released: January 14, 2013; Label: FNC Entertainment; Formats: CD, digital download | 1 | 21 | 8 | 1 | KOR: 128,026; JPN: 23,958 | |
| Can't Stop | Released: February 24, 2014; Label: FNC Entertainment; Formats: CD, digital download | 1 | 15 | 2 | 6 | KOR: 117,371; JPN: 19,429 | |
| Blueming | Released: April 4, 2016; Label: FNC Entertainment; Formats: CD, digital download | 1 | 13 | — | 10 | KOR: 62,026; JPN: 10,078 | |
| 7°CN | Released: March 20, 2017; Label: FNC Entertainment; Formats: CD, digital download | 2 | 33 | 1 | 8 | KOR: 53,559; JPN: 5,521 | |
| Re-Code | Released: November 17, 2020; Label: FNC Entertainment; Formats: CD, digital download | 5 | 37 | — | — | KOR: 37,380 | |
| Wanted | Released: October 20, 2021; Label: FNC Entertainment; Formats: CD, digital download | 10 | 38 | — | — | KOR: 27,996; JPN: 2,241 | |
| X | Released: October 14, 2024; Label: FNC Entertainment; Formats: CD, digital download | 9 | 34 | — | — | KOR: 50,466; JPN: 909 | |
"—" denotes releases that did not chart or were not released in that region.

=== Japanese EPs ===
| Title | Details | Peak chart positions | Sales |
| Title | Details | JPN | Sales |
|---|---|---|---|
| Now or Never | Released: August 19, 2009; Label: AI Entertainment; Language: English | — | |
| Now or Never | Re-released: March 18, 2013; Label: AI Entertainment; Language: English | 95 | JPN: 2,300 |
| Voice | Released: November 25, 2009; Label: AI Entertainment; Language: English, Japanese | — | JPN: 1,000 |
| Voice | Re-released: March 14, 2012; Label: AI Entertainment; Language: English, Japanese | 91 | JPN: 1,113 |
"—" denotes releases that did not chart or were not released in that region.

== Singles ==
=== As lead artist ===
==== Korean singles ====
| Title | Year | Peak chart positions | | | Sales | Album |
| Title | Year | KOR | KOR Hot | US World | Sales | Album |
|---|---|---|---|---|---|---|
| "I'm a Loner" | 2010 | 2 | — | — | KOR: 3,157,800 | Bluetory |
| "Love" | 2010 | 2 | — | — | KOR: 2,445,117 | Bluelove |
| "Intuition" | 2011 | 1 | — | — | KOR: 2,253,757 | First Step |
| "Love Girl (New ver.)" | 2011 | 19 | — | — | KOR: 503,053 | First Step +1 Thank You |
| "Still in Love" | 2012 | 3 | 6 | — | KOR: 1,312,009 | Ear Fun |
| "Hey You" | 2012 | 1 | 7 | — | KOR: 1,257,932 | Ear Fun |
| "I'm Sorry" | 2013 | 2 | 2 | 17 | KOR: 1,223,055 | Re:Blue |
| "Can't Stop" | 2014 | 3 | 6 | 19 | KOR: 753,113 | Can't Stop |
| "Cinderella" | 2015 | 10 | — | — | KOR: 269,573 | 2gether |
| "You're So Fine" | 2016 | 19 | — | — | KOR: 342,546 | Blueming |
| "Between Us" | 2017 | 33 | — | — | KOR: 44,833 | 7°CN |
| "Then, Now and Forever" | 2020 | 145 | — | — | | Re-Code |
| "Love Cut" | 2021 | 118 | — | — | | Wanted |
| "A Sleepless Night" (그리운건 그대일까 그때일까) | 2024 | 91 | — | — | | X |
| "Killer Joy" | 2026 | — | — | — | | 3Logy |
"—" denotes releases that did not chart in that region.

==== Japanese singles ====
| Title | Year | Peak chart positions | | | Sales | Certifications | Album |
| Title | Year | KOR Alb. (Note: As governed by South Korean copyright law, an album is classified as a "physical object that contains music".) | JPN | JPN Hot | Sales | Certifications | Album |
|---|---|---|---|---|---|---|---|
| "The Way" | 2010 | — | 26 | — | JPN: 9,898 | | 392 |
| "I Don't Know Why" | 2010 | — | 15 | — | JPN: 14,530 | | 392 |
| "Re-maintenance" | 2011 | — | 12 | — | JPN: 16,790 | | 392 |
| "In My Head" | 2011 | 29 | 4 | 4 | JPN: 83,351; KOR: 924 | RIAJ: Gold | Code Name Blue |
| "Where You Are" | 2012 | 11 | 1 | 2 | JPN: 71,417; KOR: 981 | | Code Name Blue |
| "Come On" | 2012 | 36 | 5 | 8 | JPN: 39,250; KOR: 698 | | Code Name Blue |
| "Robot" | 2012 | 23 | 2 | 5 | JPN: 48,311; KOR: 698 | | What Turns You On? |
| "Blind Love" | 2013 | — | 4 | 7 | JPN: 54,254 | | What Turns You On? |
| "Lady" | 2013 | — | 4 | 7 | JPN: 46,468 | | What Turns You On? |
| "Truth" | 2014 | 34 | 3 | 7 | JPN: 39,826; KOR: 425 | | Wave |
| "Go Your Way" | 2014 | — | 8 | 15 | JPN: 27,331 | | Wave |
| "White" | 2015 | — | 4 | 5 | JPN: 29,101 | | Colors |
| "Puzzle" | 2016 | — | 4 | 15 | JPN: 30,701 | | Euphoria |
| "Shake" | 2017 | — | 5 | 10 | JPN: 26,782 | | Stay Gold |
| "Zoom" | 2021 | — | 8 | — | | | Non-album singles |
| "Let It Shine" | 2022 | — | 9 | — | | | Non-album singles |
| "Synchronize" | 2023 | — | — | — | | | Pleasures |
| "Jinsei Sanka" (人生賛歌) | 2024 | — | 7 | — | | | Non-album singles |
| "Shintōya" (心盗夜) | 2025 | — | 1 | 68 | JPN: 17,488 | | Non-album singles |
| "360°" | 2026 | — | — | — | | | Full Circle |
"—" denotes releases that did not chart in that region.

=== Promotional singles ===
| Title | Year | Peak chart positions | | Album |
| Title | Year | KOR | KOR Hot | Album |
|---|---|---|---|---|
| "Friday" (T.G.I.Friday's Brand Song) | 2012 | 26 | 36 | Non-album release |
| "Feel Good" (Samsung Galaxy Music's Brand Song) | 2013 | 27 | 15 | Non-album release |
"—" denotes releases that did not chart or were not released in that region.

=== Other charted songs ===
| Title | Year | Peak chart positions | Album |
| Title | Year | KOR (Note: Additional references for peak positions: "Love Revolution", "Now or Never", "Tattoo", "Let's Go Crazy", "Where You Are (English ver.)", "One More Time", "Blind Love".) | Album |
|---|---|---|---|
| "Y, Why..." | 2010 | 48 | Bluetory |
| "I Will... Forget You..." | 2010 | 81 | Bluetory |
| "Love Revolution" | 2010 | 129 | Bluetory |
| "Now or Never" | 2010 | 134 | Bluetory |
| "Love Light" | 2010 | 10 | Bluelove |
| "Sweet Holiday" | 2010 | 50 | Bluelove |
| "Black Flower" | 2010 | 86 | Bluelove |
| "Tattoo" | 2010 | 112 | Bluelove |
| "Let's Go Crazy" | 2010 | 166 | Bluelove |
| "Love Girl" | 2011 | 20 | First Step |
| "Imagine" | 2011 | 23 | First Step |
| "Love Follows the Rain" | 2011 | 39 | First Step |
| "I Don't Know Why" | 2011 | 41 | First Step |
| "Lie" | 2011 | 52 | First Step |
| "One Time" | 2011 | 61 | First Step |
| "Thank You" | 2011 | 69 | First Step |
| "Wanna Be Like U" | 2011 | 73 | First Step |
| "Just Please" | 2011 | 74 | First Step |
| "Ready N Go" | 2011 | 81 | First Step |
| "One of a Kind" | 2011 | 89 | First Step |
| "In My Head" | 2012 | 65 | Ear Fun |
| "Dream Boy" | 2012 | 72 | Ear Fun |
| "Run" | 2012 | 79 | Ear Fun |
| "Rock n' Roll" | 2012 | 88 | Ear Fun |
| "Myself More than You" | 2013 | 41 | Re:Blue |
| "Coffee Shop" | 2013 | 46 | Re:Blue |
| "The Guy Like Me" | 2013 | 48 | Re:Blue |
| "La La La" | 2013 | 56 | Re:Blue |
| "Where You Are (English ver.)" | 2013 | 122 | Re:Blue |
| "Lady" | 2013 | 43 | Present |
| "One More Time" | 2013 | 192 | Present |
| "Blind Love" | 2013 | 199 | Present |
| "Cold Love" | 2014 | 52 | Can't Stop |
| "Sleepless Night" | 2014 | 60 | Can't Stop |
| "Love Is..." | 2014 | 64 | Can't Stop |
| "Diamond Girl" | 2014 | 65 | Can't Stop |
| "Like a Child" | 2014 | 76 | Can't Stop |

== See also ==
- CNBLUE videography
