= Wave (CNBLUE album) =

- Regular Edition cover

Studio album by CNBLUE
- Released: September 17, 2014
- Recorded: 2014
- Studio: FNC Entertainment Studio (Seoul)
- Genre: Rock, electronic dance music
- Length: 37:13
- Language: Japanese, English
- Label: Warner Music Japan

CNBLUE chronology
Can't Stop (2014)	Wave (2014)	2gether (2015)

Singles from Wave
- 1. "Truth" Released: April 23, 2014; 2. "Go Your Way" Released: August 20, 2014; 3. "Radio" Released: September 10, 2014

Wave (stylized WAVE) is the third major-label Japanese studio album (fifth overall) by South Korean pop-rock idol band CNBLUE. It was released on September 17, 2014, by Warner Music Japan. A rock album, the band infuses electronic dance music into the record. The singles "Truth" and "Go Your Way" preceded the album; "Radio" was released as the promotional single and made available as a digital download one week prior to the album's release.

Wave was released in four editions: Regular Edition, Limited Editions A and B, and a fan club-only Boice Limited Edition. It went on to debut at number three on the weekly Oricon Albums Chart. The band embarked on the CNBLUE 2014 Arena Tour "Wave" from October to November in Aichi, Tokyo, Osaka, Miyagi and Fukuoka.

== Background and development ==
Wave was announced as CNBLUE's third studio album on August 5, 2014, with a release date of September 17. Describing a wave as having various shapes of "top, middle, and bottom", the title is meant to represent varying songs included on the album. Frontman Jung Yong-hwa explained that the band wanted "people who hear our songs to feel our music like they ride a wave", while also desiring "our music to spread" on a global scale.

Due to the band's constant travels, the members wrote songs while on the road. Guitarist Lee Jong-hyun wrote "How Awesome" on a mobile app during an airplane flight, while "Control" was conceived by Jung in a hotel in Japan. While staying at a hotel during the band's Arena Tour 2013: One More Time in Japan, the bassist Lee Jung-shin wanted to write a song. Jung assigned him and the drummer Kang Min-hyuk to do it together; after listening to the melody of "Control", they conceived the idea of writing a love song, which Jung rejected. After discussing it between themselves, Kang and Lee agreed to write a song with the notion that "no one can control me". Initially written in Korean, the two faced difficulties in translating the song into English. With Jung's assistance, the translations and lyrics were completed; Kang and Lee were left uncredited. The song was originally intended to be included on the band's mini-album Can't Stop (2014) released in South Korea, but was ultimately excluded. Jung cited the limited space on the release, as well as the "different atmosphere" the song had in comparison to the other songs for its omission. He decided to add it onto the band's single "Go Your Way".

== Music structure ==
A rock album, CNBLUE incorporates electronic dance music into the record. In addition to noting that the latter was a trend at the time, Jung expressed the view that the two genres were similar in terms of their rhythm and different in instrumentation. In utilizing both genres, he felt that the two "fit to each other". He described the album as "clear, fresh, and refreshing".

The opening track is an introduction, which the band omitted on its previous album What Turns You On? (2013). The bassist Lee felt that it was needed in order to "understand the atmosphere of the album". The track begins with a guitar riff before a melody is introduced. This is followed by "Radio", a "danceable" rock track where the band integrates "strong electro sounds" into the song. Recorded with various instruments, clapping, and chanting, "Foxy" is a song that deals with the "admiration of a sexy woman". "Truth", "Lonely Night", and "Still" were identified as the few songs which dealt with the subject of love. Guitarist Lee described "How Awesome" as an expression of "the relationship of our fans and us".

== Release and promotion ==
The first single to precede Wave was "Truth", which was released on April 23, 2014. In addition to the title track, a music video for the coupling song "Still" was also made available. This was followed by the release of "Go Your Way" on August 20.). The music video for "Radio" was uploaded on Warner Music Japan's YouTube channel on August 27. The track was used as the opening theme song for the music show Music Launcher, and as the closing theme song for Music BB and Rokemitsu Friday. The single was released as a digital download on September 10.

Wave was released on September 17, 2014, in four editions: Regular Edition; Limited Edition A with bonus DVD content that includes the music video for "Radio", a special feature, and individual filming scenes for each member; Limited Edition B with bonus DVD content that includes performance footage of "Coffee Shop", "I'm Sorry", and "Lady" from the second half of the band's set at the 2013 Summer Sonic Festival and a special feature; and Boice Limited Edition with bonus DVD content that includes live and digest performance footage of "Truth", "I'm Sorry", and "Lady" from the second half of the band's set at the Official Fanmeeting 2014.

The band embarked on the CNBLUE 2014 Arena Tour "Wave" from October 9 to November 26. The concerts took place at the Nippon Gaishi Hall in Aichi, the Nippon Budokan in Tokyo, the Osaka-jō Hall in Osaka, the Sekisui Heim Super Arena in Miyagi, and the Marine Messe Fukuoka in Fukuoka. Performing 21 songs at each concert, the tour drew in 100,000 attendees in total. The Osaka-jō Hall concert was recorded and broadcast in February 2015 on Tokyo Broadcasting System Television. It later spawned a DVD and Blu-ray, which was released on March 11.

== Commercial performance ==
Wave shifted 26,051 copies on its first day of release. On the chart dated September 29, 2014, the album debuted at number three on Japan's national Oricon Albums Chart, selling 34,849 copies. It also entered the Billboard Japan Hot Albums chart at number three. By the end of its chart run, Wave sold 42,080 copies in the country.

== Track listing ==
All editions
No.	Title	Lyrics	Music	Length
1.	"Intro"		Jung Yong-hwa	1:09
2.	"Radio"	Jung Yong-hwa, miwa	Jung Yong-hwa, Heaven Light	4:13
3.	"Go Your Way"	Jung Yong-hwa, miwa	Jung Yong-hwa, Heaven Light	3:19
4.	"Truth"	Jung Yong-hwa, miwa	Jung Yong-hwa, Ryo, Lee Sang-ho	3:38
5.	"Foxy"	Lee Jong-hyun, Kosuke Oba	Lee Jong-hyun, Heaven Light	3:13
6.	"Lonely Night"	Jung Yong-hwa	Jung Yong-hwa, Heaven Light	3:22
7.	"Still"	Jung Yong-hwa, miwa	Jung Yong-hwa, Ryo	4:13
8.	"Paradise"	Lee Jong-hyun	Lee Jong-hyun	3:56
9.	"Angel"	Jung Yong-hwa	Jung Yong-hwa, Heaven Light	3:25
10.	"Control"	Jung Yong-hwa	Jung Yong-hwa, Heaven Light	3:13
11.	"How Awesome"	Lee Jong-hyun	Lee Jong-hyun, Heaven Light	3:32
Total length:				37:13

Limited Edition A — bonus DVD content
No.	Title	Length
1.	"Radio" (music video)
2.	"Radio" (special feature)
3.	"Radio" (shooting of solo cut "Yong-hwa, Jong-hyun, Min-hyuk, Jung-shin")

Limited Edition B — bonus DVD content
No.	Title	Length
1.	"Coffee Shop", "I'm Sorry", "Lady" (Live from Summer Sonic 2013 [second half])
2.	"Special feature"

Boice Limited Edition — bonus DVD content
No.	Title	Length
1.	"Truth", "I'm Sorry", "Lady" (Live & Digest from Official Fanmeeting 2014 [second half])

== Charts ==
Chart (2014)	Peak position
Billboard Japan Top Album Sales	3
Oricon Albums Chart	3
