= 2gether (CNBLUE album) =

Studio album by CNBLUE
- Released: September 14, 2015
- Recorded: 2013–15
- Studio: FNC Entertainment Studio (Seoul)
- Genre: Electronic rock, pop rock
- Length: 38:11
- Language: Korean, English
- Label: FNC Entertainment
- Producer: Han Seong-ho (exec.); Jung Yong-hwa; Han Seung-hoon; Kim Jae-yang

CNBLUE chronology
Wave (2014)	2gether (2015)	Colors (2015)

Singles from 2gether
- 1. "Cinderella" Released: September 14, 2015

2gether is the second studio album by South Korean pop rock idol band CNBLUE. It was released on September 14, 2015, under FNC Entertainment. After ending domestic promotions for Can't Stop (2014), the band concentrated on individual activities; most notably, frontman Jung Yong-hwa released his debut solo album One Fine Day (2015) in January. The remaining band members sought out opportunities in television, particularly in acting, variety show appearances, and MCing. In August 2015, it was announced that CNBLUE would release its second studio album after an absence lasting one year and seven months. With 2gether, the band decided to change the direction of its music; it stripped itself of the acoustic tracks it was known for and explored electronic dance music in order to create a particular color and form a distinctive sound.

After a series of photo and video teasers, the album and lead single "Cinderella" were released simultaneously. The band held a "Be My Cinderella" album showcase on the day of release and began promoting the album through music chart programs across various television networks by performing "Cinderella" and other album tracks. The single ultimately led the band to win a total of five music show trophies: two consecutive wins on both SBS MTV's The Show and Korean Broadcasting System's (KBS) Music Bank, and one on MBC Music's Show Champion. 2gether was met with generally favorable reviews, particularly for the band's pursuit of electronic elements. The album went on to top the Gaon Album Chart in its second week of its release and sold 83,000 copies in its home country. The band embarked on the 2015 CNBLUE Live "Come Together" concert tour, which made stops in South Korea, China, and other countries in Asia.

== Background ==
After ending domestic promotions for its fifth mini-album Can't Stop (2014), CNBLUE pursued individual activities. Frontman Jung Yong-hwa released his debut solo studio album One Fine Day (2015) in January and embarked on an Asian tour. Guitarist Lee Jong-hyun played the role of a lead character in KBS2's Orange Marmalade and participated on MBC's reality variety program We Got Married. Drummer Kang Min-hyuk took part in MBC's I Live Alone and KBS2's sports variety show Our Neighborhood Arts and Physical Education. Bassist Lee Jung-shin was an MC for SBS Plus's Fashion King: Secret Box and Mnet's music chart show M Countdown.

During a press conference in June for the 2015 Jung Yong-hwa Live "One Fine Day" concert in Taipei, he disclosed that, upon the completion of his solo promotions, CNBLUE was set to release an album in the second half of the year. On August 24, 2015, it was announced that the band would release its second studio album in September. Four days later, it was revealed that the album was titled 2gether and had a set release date of September 14, one year and seven months following Can't Stop.

== Writing and development ==
CNBLUE began developing songs for 2gether in midst of writing songs for Can't Stop. While staying at a hotel in Japan during the band's Arena Tour 2013: One More Time, bassist Lee sought out to write a song. Jung assigned him and Kang to do it together; after listening to the melody of "Control", the two conceived the idea of writing a love song, which Jung rejected. After discussing it between themselves, Kang and Lee agreed to write a song with the notion that "no one can control me". Initially written in Korean, the two faced difficulties in translating the song into English. With the assistance of Jung, the translations and lyrics were completed; Kang and Lee were left uncredited. The song was originally intended to be included on Can't Stop, but was ultimately excluded. Jung cited the limited space on the release, as well as the "different atmosphere" the song had in comparison to the other songs for its omission. He decided to add it to the band's Japanese single "Go Your Way". The lyrics were rewritten in Korean by the bassist for its inclusion on 2gether, marking the first song to be credited under his name since the debut of the band. "Radio" was previously recorded in Japanese for CNBLUE's album Wave, which was re-recorded in Korean for inclusion on 2gether. "Footsteps", originally titled "Heart Song" and included in its Japanese single "Truth", was also rewritten in Korean. In midst of filming KBS2's Orange Marmalade, guitarist Lee took the opportunity to write "Hero".

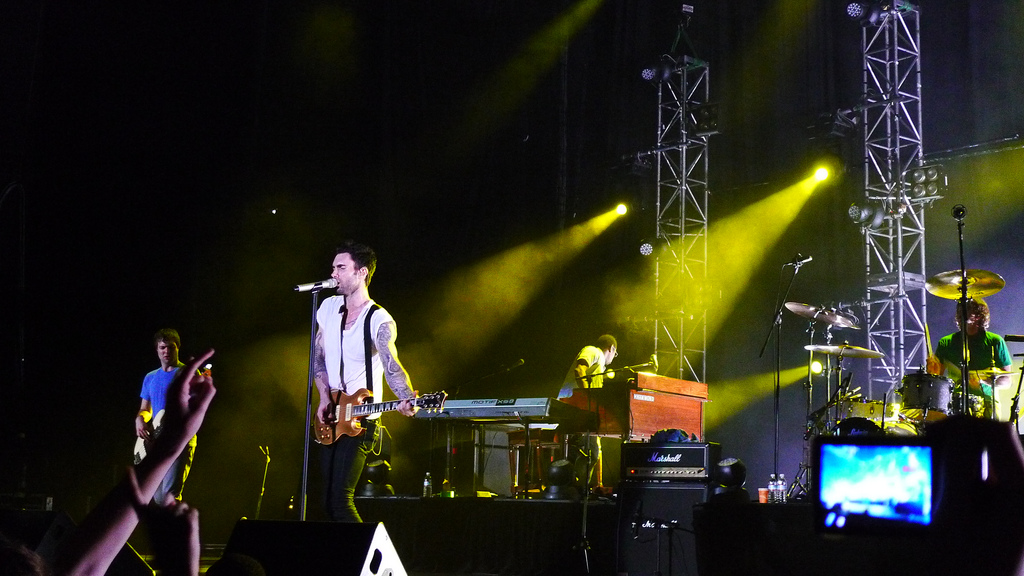
Often compared to Maroon 5 (pictured), CNBLUE set out to form its own musical identity

Often compared to American pop-rock band Maroon 5, CNBLUE has found the comparisons "honorable", but has expressed its desire to distinguish its musical color and establish a unique sound. In CNBLUE's previous albums, Jung made a conscious effort to record music in order to receive recognition for it as an idol band. After deciding to disregard those notions, he opted to create "more comfortable" music that suited the band; as a result, the acoustic music which was present in the band's previous albums was entirely excluded from 2gether. In developing the record, CNBLUE set out to "really [come] together with our music, working with each other on the compositions". CNBLUE took the initiative to change the sound of its music for a "more mainstream feel" by integrating elements of electronic dance music into the album. The title of the album was conceived by Jung while he was eating patbingsu with bassist Lee. It signifies CNBLUE's second studio album, as well as enjoyment of the band's music together. The album was recorded in Seoul at the FNC Entertainment Studio. Mixing took place there, as well as at Cube Studio and MasterPiece SoundLab; it was mastered at the SUONO Mastering Studio.

== Music structure ==
Musically, 2gether explores the Top 40, electro, and alternative rock. "Cinderella", the lead single of the album, is a pop-rock song that incorporates disco and elements of electronic music. The song begins with "warped vocals, zipping synths, and booming drum machines" before building up into the "explosive chorus", leading into its catchy hook. The song was written and composed Jung and serves as a take on the European folktale of the same name with "trendy sounds" and "modern sensibilities". "Hide and Seek" is a track that affixes a blaring saxophone. "Roller Coaster" is a pop-rock song with influences of reggae and ska, melded with a synthesizer. In "Domino", Jung mixed CNBLUE's traditional rock sound with popular music to appeal to the masses. Consisting of "crunchy" synths coupled with a funk rhythm guitar, the 1980s synthpop song features Wheein of girl group Mamamoo, the band's first ever feature. Written and composed be guitarist Lee, "Hero" is a song reminiscent of 1990s alternative rock. He created it in tribute to his father, his first attempt to write a song for him. "Catch Me" is a rock song which draws inspirations from 1980s dance music and is blended with a synthesizer. A synthpop song, "Drunken Night" describes the emancipation from the burden of expectations with a night out of alcohol consumption. "Hold My Hand" is a medium-tempo jazz pop song infused with a "romantic" clarinet. An electronic rock song, "Radio" features a heavy guitar and a synthesizer. "Footsteps" is a Britpop-inspired song that deals with the idea of finding footprints along one's path that others have traveled, signifying "you are not alone".

== Artwork concept and packaging ==
2gether is available in three editions. The concept of version A revolves around the theme of morning and showcases CNBLUE's "sexy change". It includes a 68-page photobook, one out of four random photo card between two sets, and a poster. The concept of version B presents the members in a forest, in which they exhibit "dreamlike atmospheres". It includes a 64-page photobook, one out of four random photo card between two sets, and a poster. The cover art for these two versions display a pattern of geometric diamonds. The album's title is split into '2' and 'gether', encased within the diamond in the center of the cover. The artwork for the special version of 2gether was designed by Belgian artist Sammy Slabbinck, his first time working with South Korean musicians. It includes a 16-page photobook and a poster.

== Release and promotion ==
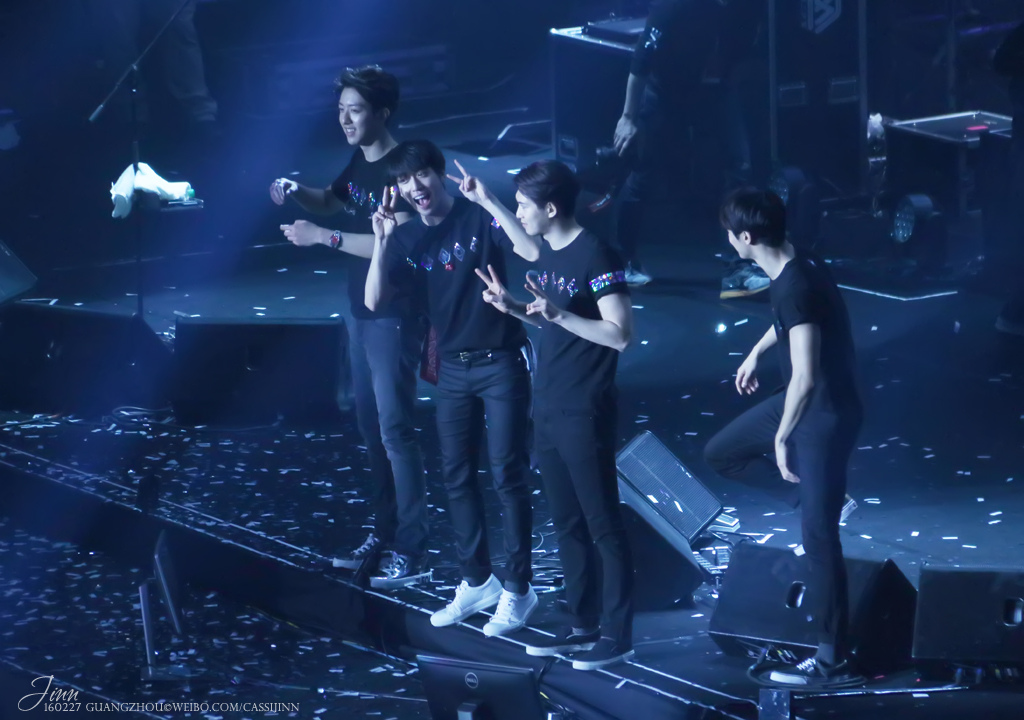
2015 CNBLUE Live "Come Together" concert in Shanghai, China

On September 2, a set of teaser photos for version A of 2gether was published. A second set of teaser photos for version B followed the next day. On the following day, the opening trailer for "Cinderella" was uploaded on CNBLUE's YouTube channel. The four members are shown awakening, each with a single high heel in their possession. Between September 7–10, individual opening trailers were released daily, each preceded by the "CNBLUE Cinderella V Week" show on Naver's mobile app V directly before their release; bassist Lee, drummer Kang, and guitarist Lee held a 10-minute broadcast, while Jung Yong-hwa held a 15-minute broadcast. This was followed by the release of the music video teaser for "Cinderella" on the subsequent day, as well as a highlight medley for the album. One hour prior to the release of the album, CNBLUE broadcast from Japan on the V app to discuss the album and sing a portion of the lead single, as well as snippets of other selected songs.

2gether and the music video for "Cinderella" were concurrently released on September 14. That same day, CNBLUE held the "Be My Cinderella" album showcase at the AX Hall in the Gwangjang-dong neighborhood of Seoul, which was broadcast on the V app. On September 17, CNBLUE began promoting "Cinderella" by performing the song on weekly music chart shows. In addition to the lead single, the band also performed "Radio" on Mnet's music chart show M Countdown. "Hold My Hand" on KBS's Music Bank, "Roller Coaster" on Munhwa Broadcasting Corporation's (MBC) Show! Music Core, "Domino" on Seoul Broadcasting System's (SBS) Inkigayo, "Footsteps" on SBS MTV's The Show, and "Domino" on MBC Music's Show Champion. On the September 22 broadcast of The Show, CNBLUE earned its first music show win with "Cinderella", followed by its second win on Show Champion the day after. The song earned the band its third win on Music Bank that same week; the episode did not air due to the Chuseok holiday. CNBLUE earned two consecutive wins on The Show and Music Bank a week later, bringing the total of music show wins up to five.

The quartet were guests on KBS2's talk show You Hee-yeol's Sketchbook, where they performed "Cinderella", as well as a rearranged version of "I'm a Loner" and "Can't Stop". CNBLUE appeared on SBS Power FM's Cultwo Show and KBS Cool FM's Kiss the Radio in order to promote the album. The band, sans guitarist Lee, also made a surprise appearance on the September 27 broadcast of KBS2's Gag Concert for the same purpose. The band held the CNBLUE 2nd Album [2gether] Behind Day event on October 9 to commemorate the end of the album's domestic promotional cycle. tHE final music show performance was broadcast on Show! Music Core on October 17.

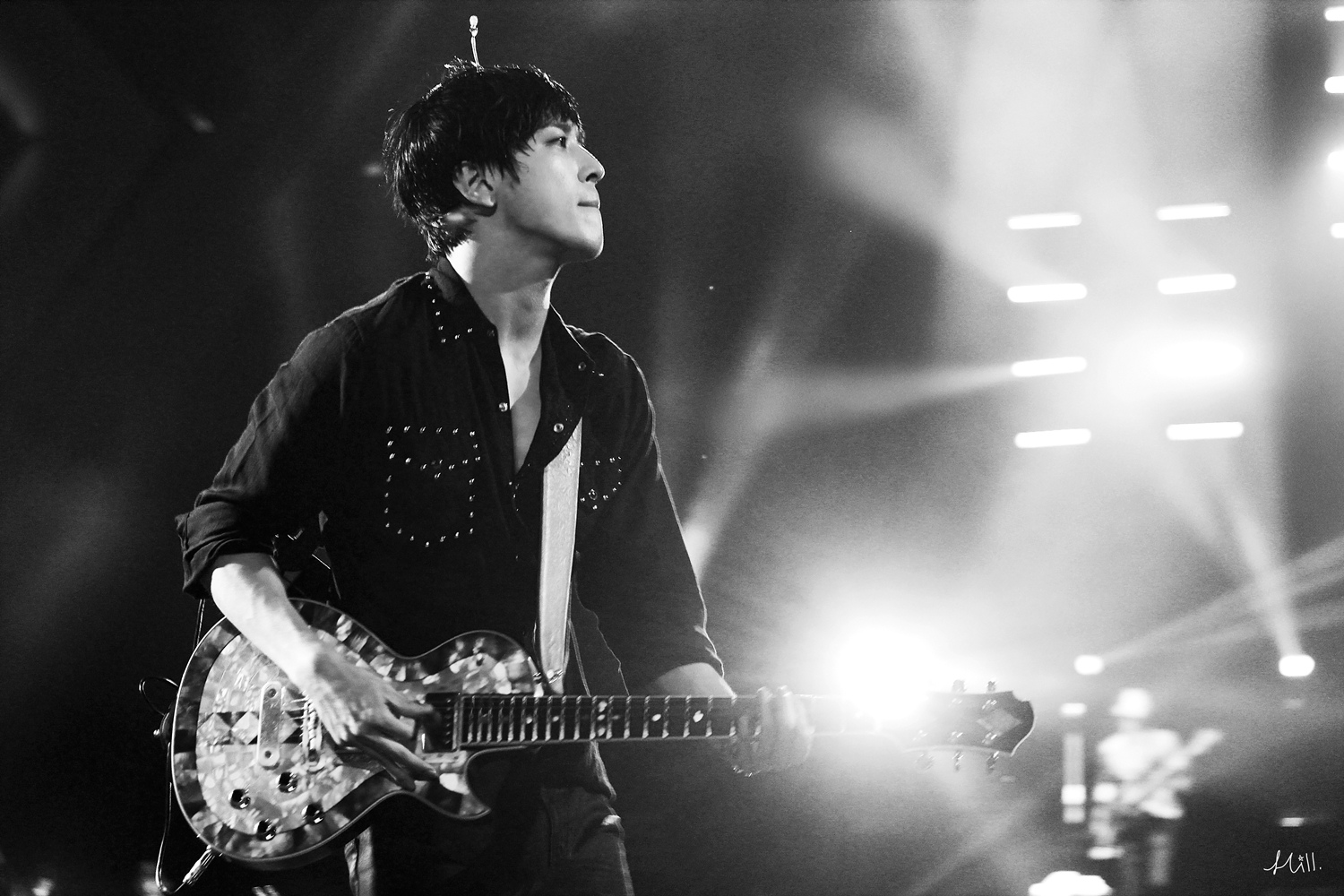
Jung Yong-hwa performing at the 2015 CNBLUE Live "Come Together" concert in Shanghai, China

The band embarked on the 2015 CNBLUE Live "Come Together" concert tour. The first concert took place on October 2 at the Mercedes-Benz Arena in Shanghai, China, followed by two concerts at the Jamsil Arena between October 24–25 in Seoul, South Korea, two concerts at the AsiaWorld–Expo arena between November 21–22 in Hong Kong, one at the Impact, Muang Thong Thani arena on January 16, 2016, in Bangkok, Thailand, one at the Workers' Stadium on January 23 in Beijing, China, one at the Singapore Indoor Stadium on February 13 in Kallang, two at the Taipei Nangang Exhibition Center between February 19–20 in Taipei, Taiwan, and one at the Guangzhou International Sports Arena on February 27 in Guangzhou, China. The concert at the Dalian Zhongsheng Center scheduled on December 19 in Dalian was canceled "due to unforeseen reasons". One concert will take place at the Olympic Sports Centre on March 12 in Nanjing, one at the International Expo Center on March 19 in Chongqing, and one at the Huanglong Gymnasium on March 26 in Hangzhou.

== Critical reception ==
2gether was met with generally favorably reviews from music critics. Writing for Billboard magazine, columnist Jeff Benjamin felt that the similarities between CNBLUE and Maroon 5 were "more striking than ever", noting that it "may position them to be more internationally appealing than ever". In spite of the change in direction of the band's music on the album, Benjamin observed that the "sentimental songwriting" and "vivacious energy" persisted within the band. In a 10asia article where three staff individually picked their favorite song from recent releases, Park Soo-jeong named "Domino" as the highlight of the album. Commending the yin and yang harmonization between Jung's "dreamy vocals" and Wheein's "feminine and lucid voice", she took recognition of the "immensely vast range of Jung Yong-hwa's musical spectrum".

Rating the album three and a half stars out of five, Jung Min-jae of online magazine IZM sensed that CNBLUE "adheres to its wide-ranging pop rock" in 2gether. Lauding Jung's versatile vocal styles throughout the album and the band's blending of music, he felt that the band's "signature smooth melodies and waving grooves are more attractive than ever". He complimented the "stable, tidied color of its sound", acknowledging "how much effort was put in to its solid structure." He named "Domino" and "Radio" as the highlights of the album that showcased "a new side of the band", while also noting tracks like "Roller Coaster" and "Hero" draw from the band's previous work to strike a balance within the album. He expressed that the "dramatic" progression of CNBLUE's music was "unfathomable" from its career beginnings. In spite of lyrics lacking depth, in addition to compositions and arrangements which fell short of diversity, he stated that the "neat composition of the tracks makes you feel good", which produced a "well-made pop rock album". Rating the album three stars out of five, Jung Hae-wook of News Tomato complimented the band on the mixture of electronic rock and being able to form a distinct sound between the tracks, as well as their effort to experiment in order to establish its musical identity.

Music critic Kim Young-dae noted that the album exhibited "diverse genres and approaches, fitting well into the current scene as a result". He observed that the band avoided a cliché chorus and opted for "trendy brass grooves and a fluent melody" in "Hide and Seek", and dubbed the experimentation in the composition and arrangement of "Domino" as "refreshing". Also writing for Idology as 'Mimyo', musician Moon Yong-min noticed that the album "sets its foot between [the] uneasy cleavages" of rock, K-pop, and dance music "from the texture of the approach". He sensed that the mixture of sounds came across as "nonchalant" as opposed to engaging in them for the purpose of "popular appeal or an 'edgy', hybrid element". He recalled past attempts of rock band popular music, but noted that CNBLUE worked well in avoiding the "discomfort" of trying to sell records. In a mixed review, Cao Jiefeng of Malaysian newspaper Sin Chew Daily claimed that the band lacks the ability to create a "hit hook" and that it should strive to develop more "outstanding" melodies. He pointed out that the element of rock music almost disappeared in some tracks, saying that "Drunken Night" was essentially a techno dance-pop song that sounded like a 2PM or B1A4 "side-cut". He spotlighted "Domino" as one of the top tracks, stating that the "cool rockers" become "the romantic bourgeoisie" in the song. He also applauded "Radio"; he compared it to a British band Coldplay's and Swedish producer Avicii's "A Sky Full of Stars", revering its "grand chorus" and "wild guitar solo". He concluded that 2gether is a "revolutionary production" that paved the way to a "promising start" in CNBLUE distinguishing itself from Maroon 5.

== Commercial performance ==
On the chart dated September 13 – 20, 2015, 2gether debuted at number two on the Gaon Album Chart, outranked by Super Junior's Magic. The following week, the album rose to the top of the chart. It fell to number three on its third week. The record ranked at number 30 on Gaon's year-end chart for selling 82,748 copies in South Korea.

2gether also debuted at number three on Billboard magazine's World Albums Chart. In Japan, the album debuted at number 19 on the weekly Oricon Albums Chart, selling 3,716 copies in its first week. It sold an additional 3,069 on the following week, peaking at number 14. By the end of its chart run, the album sold 12,672 copies in the country.

== Track listing ==
Track listing
No.	Title	Lyrics	Music	Arrangement	Length
1.	"Cinderella" (신데렐라; Sinderella)	Jung Yong-hwa	Jung Yong-hwa	Jung Yong-hwa, Lee Sang-ho	3:21
2.	"Hide and Seek" (숨바꼭질; Sumbakkokjil)	Jung Yong-hwa	Jung Yong-hwa	Jung Yong-hwa, Lee Sang-ho	2:48
3.	"Roller Coaster" (롤러코스터; Rolleokoseuteo)	Jung Yong-hwa	Jung Yong-hwa	Jung Yong-hwa, Go Jin-young	3:30
4.	"Domino" (featuring Wheein of Mamamoo)	Jung Yong-hwa	Jung Yong-hwa	Jung Yong-hwa, Go Jin-young	3:27
5.	"Hero"	Lee Jong-hyun	Lee Jong-hyun, Lee Sang-ho	Lee Sang-ho	3:54
6.	"Drunken Night"	Lee Jong-hyun	Lee Jong-hyun, Han Seung-hoon, Seo Yong-bae	Seo Yong-bae	3:08
7.	"Catch Me"	Jung Yong-hwa	Jung Yong-hwa	Jung Yong-hwa, Park Hyun-woo	3:13
8.	"Hold My Hand"	Jung Yong-hwa	Jung Yong-hwa	Masayuki Iwata	3:55
9.	"Control"	Lee Jung-shin	Jung Yong-hwa, Han Seung-hoon	Go Jin-young, Park Hyun-woo	3:12
10.	"Radio"	Jung Yong-hwa	Jung Yong-hwa, Han Seung-hoon	Tomozaku Miura, Jun Inoue	4:12
11.	"Footsteps" (발자국; Baljaguk)	Lee Jong-hyun	Lee Jong-hyun, Kim Jae-yang	Lee Jong-hyun, Go Jin-young, Park Hyun-woo	3:31
Total length:					38:11

== Credits and personnel ==
Credits adapted from the album's liner notes.

- CNBLUE – chorus
  - Jung Yong-hwa – record producer, composer, lyricist, arranger, guitar
  - Kang Min-hyuk – drums
  - Lee Jong-hyun – composer, lyricist, arranger, guitar
  - Lee Jung-shin – lyricist, bass
- Choi Hyo-yeong – mastering engineer
- Go Jin-yeong – arranger, bass
- Han Seong-ho – executive producer
- Han Seung-hoon – producer, composer, arranger, piano
- Jeon Geun-hwa – chorus
- Jo Seong-wan – supervisor
- Jun Inoue – arranger
- Jung Jae-pil – guitar
- Kim Jae-yang – producer, composer
- Kim Jong-gap – making photography
- Kim Se-yong – making photography
- Kwon Woo-mi – A&R
- Lee Yu-jin – recording engineer, mixing engineer
- Lee Sang-ho – composer, arranger, piano
- Lee Tae-wook – guitar
- Masayuki Iwata – arranger
- MasterKey – mixing engineer
- Park Hyun-woo – arranger
- Park Jeong-min – recording engineer
- Park Jin-se – recording engineer
- Seo Yong-bae – composer, arranger
- Shin Seon-hye – photography
- Tomokazu Miura – arranger
- Uncle Jo – mixing engineer

== Charts ==
Chart (2015)	Peak position
Billboard World Albums Chart	3
Gaon Album Chart	1
Oricon Albums Chart	14

== Release history ==
Region	Date	Format
South Korea	September 14, 2015	CD (version A), digital download
Worldwide	September 14, 2015	Digital download
South Korea	September 21, 2015	CD (version B)
South Korea	September 30, 2015	CD (special version)
