= Shake (CNBLUE song) =

- Regular Edition cover

Single by CNBLUE

from the album Stay Gold
- Released: May 10, 2017
- Genre: Dance-pop
- Length: 2:58
- Label: Warner Music Japan
- Songwriters: Jung Yong-hwa; Lee Jong-hyun; Albi Albertsson; Justin Reinstein

CNBLUE singles chronology
"Between Us" (2017)	"Shake" (2017)	"Starting Over" (2017)

"Shake" (stylized "SHAKE") is a song by South Korean pop-rock idol band CNBLUE. It was released on May 10, 2017, as its 11th single under Warner Music Japan and 14th single overall in Japan. The song was written by members Jung Yong-hwa and Lee Jong-hyun, along with composers Albi Albertsson and Justin Reinstein.

The single was released in four editions: Regular Edition, Limited Editions A and B, and a fan club-only Boice Limited Edition. "Shake" debuted on the weekly Oricon Singles Chart at number five. The band has embarked on the CNBLUE Spring Live 2017 "Shake! Shake!" arena tour, where they will hold six concerts in Tokyo, Aichi, and Osaka.

== Composition and recording ==
"Shake" was written by frontman Jung Yong-hwa, who composed the song along with bandmate Lee Jong-hyun and musicians Albi Albertsson and Justin Reinstein. It is a dance-pop song which is evocative of "early summer feels". While writing the song, Jung imagined working as a salaryman "doing a job I don't like and didn't suit me", concluding that, "we should forget such difficult times together because working is difficult no matter the job". The band sought to conceive a "fun song", with Jung wanting to "cheer up the listener".

The four composers met during a song camp, where they wrote "Shake". While production took place in studio, the track was arranged after they deliberated between each other; they ultimately decided on a "bright" atmosphere for the song.

== Release and promotion ==
"Shake" was announced as CNBLUE's 11th single on March 9, 2017, with a release date of May 10; a music video teaser for "Shake" was simultaneously uploaded on YouTube that day. A video digest for the single was unveiled on April 3. A choreography video was released on April 14. This was followed by the full music video was released five days later. The song was made available on online music stores on April 21.

"Shake" was released on May 10 in four editions: Regular Edition; Limited Edition A with bonus DVD content that includes the music video and making film of "Shake", and multi-angle performance footage of "Royal Rumble" and "Face to Face" at CNBLUE's 5th Anniversary Arena Tour 2016 "Our Glory Days" at Nippon Gaishi Hall; Limited Edition B with bonus DVD content that includes multi-angle performance footage of "Be OK" and "Glory Days" at the arena tour; and Boice Limited Edition with one of four possible tumblers.

The band embarked on the CNBLUE Spring Live 2017 "Shake! Shake!" arena tour; the first two concerts took place between May 17–18 in Tokyo at Nippon Budokan, and continued through June 17–18 in Aichi at the Nippon Gaishi Hall, and on June 21–22 in Osaka at the Osaka-jō Hall. The final two shows of the tour were recorded, which will spawn a DVD and Blu-ray of the same name on October 10.

== Chart performance ==
On the issue dated May 22, 2017, "Shake" debuted at number five on the weekly Oricon Singles Chart, selling 25,238 copies in its first week. On the same issue date, the song debuted at number 10 on the Billboard Japan Hot 100. The single has sold 26,782 copies since its release.

== Track listing ==
All editions
No.	Title	Lyrics	Music	Length
1.	"Shake"	Jung Yong-hwa	Jung Yong-hwa, Lee Jong-hyun, Albi Albertsson, Justin Reinstein	2:58
2.	"Someone Else"	Jung Yong-hwa, Han Seung-hoon	Jung Yong-hwa, Han Seung-hoon	4:04
3.	"Was So Perfect"	Lee Jong-hyun	Lee Jong-hyun, Han Seung-hoon	3:43
Total length:				10:45

Limited Edition A – bonus DVD content
No.	Title	Length
1.	"Shake" (music video)
2.	"Shake" (making movie)
3.	"Royal Rumble" (5th Anniversary Arena Tour 2016 "Our Glory Days" @Nippon Gaishi Hall multi angle)
4.	"Face to Face" (5th Anniversary Arena Tour 2016 "Our Glory Days" @Nippon Gaishi Hall multi angle)

Limited Edition B – bonus DVD content
No.	Title	Length
1.	"Be OK" (5th Anniversary Arena Tour 2016 "Our Glory Days" @Nippon Gaishi Hall multi angle)
2.	"Glory Days" (5th Anniversary Arena Tour 2016 "Our Glory Days" @Nippon Gaishi Hall multi angle)

== Charts ==
Chart (2017)	Peak position
Billboard Japan Hot 100	10
Oricon Singles Chart	5
