= Ear Fun =

- Ear Fun album cover

EP by CN Blue
- Released: March 26, 2012
- Recorded: 2011–2012
- Genre: Pop rock
- Length: 21:16
- Language: Korean
- Labels: FNC Entertainment / CJ E&M Music and Live; Warner Music Taiwan
- Producers: Han Seong-ho, Han Seung-hoon, Kim Jae-yang

CN Blue chronology
392 (2011)	Ear Fun (2012)	Code Name Blue (2012)

Alternative Cover
- Special Limited Edition cover

Singles from Ear Fun
- 1. "Still in Love" Released: 21 November 2011; 2. "Hey You" Released: 21 November 2011

Music video
- Still in Love on YouTube; Hey You on YouTube

Ear Fun is the third Korean extended play (sixth overall) by the South Korean pop rock band CN Blue. It was released on March 26, 2012 with the track "Hey You" as the promotional single.

== Background and release ==
As a teaser of the mini-album, the song "Still in Love" was released on March 16, along with a special music video featuring scenes of the group in a recording studio. The EP was scheduled to be released on March 27, but it was released one day before the official release due to the high popularity of the song "Still in Love". The first teaser of the song and music video for "Hey You" was released on March 19 featuring the member Jung Shin. The second teaser was released on March 21 featuring the member Jong Hyun. The third teaser was released on March 22 featuring the member Min Hyuk. The fourth and last teaser was released on March 23 featuring the member Jung Yong-hwa. The full music video of "Hey You" and mini-album were released on March 26. The album also features a Korean version of the song "In My Head", the group's major debut single and fourth overall single in Japan. This version of the song was firstly introduced on KBS's show Music Bank Year-End special on December 23, 2011 with few changes of the lyrics.

A special limited edition of the EP was released on April 10, 2012. It includes the same track list and there will be 140 pages of pictorial photos and a DVD containing a 20-minute clip of the members shooting in the U.S. In addition, the special limited edition will also include four supplemental sections for each of the members (18 pages individual shoot for each of the members).

== Composition ==
The title song "Hey You" was written by Han Seong Ho and composed by Kim Do Hoon and Lee Sang Ho, same writer and composer of the group's other title songs "Intuition", "Love" and "I'm a Loner".

== Promotion ==
The promotions of the song "Hey You" started on March 29, 2012 on Mnet's show M! Countdown. They are also promoting on the shows Music Bank, Music Core, Inkigayo, and Show Champion. Two other songs of the EP were also performed: "Still in Love" was used for the comeback week performances and "In My Head" was used for the goodbye week on Music Bank. The album Ear Fun and the title track "Hey You" won four music show awards, from M! Countdown on April 5, Show Champion on April 10, Music Bank on April 20, and Inkigayo mutizen on April 22. The promotions ended on April 22, on SBS Inkigayo.

== Track listing ==
From CNBlue

No.	Title	Lyrics	Music	Arrangement	Length
1.	"Hey You"	Han Seong-ho	Kim Do-hoon, Lee Sang-ho	Kim Do-hoon, Lee Sang-ho	4:00
2.	"Still in Love" (아직 사랑한다; Ajig Saranghanda)	Han Seong-ho, Kim Jae-yang, Jung Yong-hwa	Kim Jae-yang, Jung Yong-hwa	Kim Jae-yang	3:18
3.	"Dream Boy"	Han Seong-ho	Han Seung-hoon, Kim Jae-yang, Jung Yong-hwa	Han Seung-hoon	3:03
4.	"Rock n' Roll"	Han Seong-ho, Jung Yong-hwa	Han Seung-hoon, Jung Yong-hwa	Han Seung-hoon, Go Jin-young, Park Hyun-woo	3:23
5.	"Run"	Han Seong-ho	Han Seung-hoon, Jung Yong-hwa	Han Seung-hoon	3:17
6.	"In My Head" (Korean version)	Jung Yong-hwa	Jung Yong-hwa	Tamai Kenji, Momota Rui	4:18
Total length:					21:16

Special Limited edition – DVD
No.	Title	Length
1.	"DVD Special Feature" (20 minutes approximately)

Taiwan edition – DVD
No.	Title	Length
1.	"Ear Fun album teaser" (Yonghwa version)
2.	"Ear Fun album teaser" (Jonghyun version)
3.	"Ear Fun album teaser" (Jungshin version)
4.	"Ear Fun album teaser" (Minhyuk version)
5.	"Still in Love" (Music video, with Chinese subtitles)
6.	"Hey You" (Music video, with Chinese subtitles)
7.	"Ear Fun album shoot" (Off-shot movie, with Chinese subtitles)

== Chart performance ==
=== Album chart ===
Chart	Peak position
Japan Oricon Weekly album chart	15
South Korea Gaon Weekly album chart	1
South Korea Gaon Weekly domestic album chart	1
South Korea Gaon Monthly album chart	2
South Korea Gaon Mid-Year album chart	5
South Korea Gaon 2012 Yearly album chart	14
Taiwan G-Music Weekly Top 20 Combo Chart	5
Taiwan G-Music International Chart	2
Taiwan G-Music Asia Album Chart	1

=== Singles chart ===
Song	Peak chart position			
Song	KOR Gaon Top200			KOR Billboard
Song	weekly	monthly	yearly	KOR Billboard
"Hey You"	1	13	111	7
"Still in Love"	3	9	139	6
"Dream Boy"	72	—	—	96
"Rock n' Roll"	88	—	—	—
"Run"	79	—	—	—
"In My Head" (Korean version)	65	—	—	80
"—" denotes releases that did not chart or were not released in that region.

=== Digital sales ===
Chart	Songs			
Chart	"Hey You"		"Still in Love"	
Chart	Peak position	Sales	Peak position	Sales
South Korea Gaon Yearly digital aggregate chart	111	116,452,770 aggregates	139	98,770,318 aggregates
South Korea Gaon Yearly digital download chart	120	1,257,932 downloads	112	1,312,009 downloads
South Korea Gaon Yearly digital streaming chart	135	11,080,458 streamings	168	8,547,952 streamings

=== Album sales ===
Country	Chart	Period	Peak position	Sales	Accumulative sales
Japan	Oricon physical sales			14,765+	
South Korea	Gaon Monthly Album Chart	March 2012	#5	59,944	59,944+
South Korea	Gaon Monthly Album Chart	April 2012	#2	60,144	120,088+
South Korea	Gaon Yearly Album Chart	2012	#14	122,515+	122,515+

== Release history ==
Country	Date	Format	Label
South Korea	March 16, 2012 (Single: Still in Love)	Digital download	FNC Entertainment
South Korea	March 26, 2012	CD, Digital download	FNC Entertainment
South Korea	April 10, 2012 (Special Limited edition)	CD	FNC Entertainment
Taiwan	May 4, 2012	CD, CD+DVD	Warner Music Taiwan

== Award and nomination ==
Year	Award	Category	Nomination	Result	Ref
2012	14th Mnet Asian Music Awards	Best Band Performance	"Hey You"	Nominated	
2012	14th Mnet Asian Music Awards	Song of the Year	"Hey You"	Nominated	
