= Re:Blue =

EP by CNBLUE
- Released: 14 January 2013
- Recorded: 2011–2012
- Genre: Pop-rock, electronic rock
- Length: 21:56
- Language: Korean
- Label: FNC Entertainment / CJ E&M Music and Live; Warner Music Taiwan
- Producer: Jung Yong-hwa, Han Seong-ho, Han Seung-hun, Kim Jae-yang

CNBLUE chronology
Code Name Blue (2012)	Re:Blue (2013)	What Turns You On? (2013)

Singles from Re:Blue
- 1. "I'm Sorry" Released: 14 January 2013

Re:Blue (stylized Re:BLUE) is the fourth Korean extended play (seventh overall) by South Korean rock band CNBLUE. It was released on January 14, 2013 with the track "I'm Sorry" as the promotional single.

== Background and release ==
The group's comeback in South Korea was officially announced on December 17, 2012 via their concert Blue Night, held in Seoul. The mini-album's release date was scheduled for January 14, day of the group's third Korean anniversary and also third anniversary of the group's first Korean mini-album Bluetory. The first teaser was revealed on the group's website on January 3, 2013 with screencaps of the drama video teaser. The image also revealed 8 blank spaces (″___ _____″) that speculated if it was the name of the promotional track or of the mini-album's title. On January 7, the first video teasers were released. The teasers are emotional versions of the members expressing sadness or fury after a girl break up with them and says "I'm sorry". All individual video teasers were released on the same day. On January 9, a photo teaser was released. The photoshoot of the album was made in the streets of London. The group's agency, FNC Entertainment, revealed: "We worked hard to find a location that showcases London’s exotic aura. Although the filming was delayed due to the rainy weather, everyone passionately participated in the photoshoot." One day later, on January 10, the first music video teaser was released. On January 11, the second music video teaser was released. On January 14, along with the group's third Korean anniversary celebration, the mini-album and music video of "I'm Sorry" were released at the same time.

== Composition ==
The mini-album is composed by six tracks, five Korean and an English track. A major part of the tracks were written by the member Jung Yong-hwa. The tracks "I'm Sorry", used as title track of the mini-album, and "Naram Namja" were written by Yong-hwa and Han Sung-ho and composed by Yong-hwa and Han Seung-hoon. "Coffee Shop" and "La La La" were written and composed by Yong-hwa. "Na Geudaeboda" was written by Han Sung-ho and Kim Jae-yang, who also composed the song along with the member Lee Jong-hyun. The English version of the song "Where You Are" was written and composed by Yong-hwa. The song was originally recorded in Japanese and first released on the Japanese album Code Name Blue as a bonus track of the CD+DVD edition.

== Promotion ==
The promotions of the song "I'm Sorry" started on January 18, 2013 on KBS' show Music Bank. They are also promoting on the shows Music Core, Inkigayo and Show Champion. Three songs of the mini-album were also performed during the first week of promotions: the song "Myself More Than You" on Music Bank on January 18, the English version of "Where You Are" on Music Core on January 19 and "Coffee Shop" on Inkigayo on January 20. At the date, the song won 5 TV show awards, three on Show Champion: on January 30, February 6 and on February 13 and also won two on Music Bank on February 1.February 8 The promotions ended on February 24, on SBS' Inkigayo.

== Track listing ==
Re:Blue
No.	Title	Lyrics	Music	Arrangement	Length
1.	"I'm Sorry"	Jung Yong-hwa, Han Sung-ho	Jung Yong-hwa, Han Seung-ho	Lee Sang-ho	3:50
2.	"Coffee Shop"	Jung Yong-hwa, Ophelia	Jung Yong-hwa	Jung Yong-hwa, Han Seung-hoon	3:28
3.	"Na Geudaeboda" (나 그대보다; "Myself More Than You")	Han Sung-ho, Kim Jae-yang	Lee Jong-hyun, Kim Jae-yang	Kim Jae-yang	3:49
4.	"Naran Namja" (나란 남자; "The Guy Like Me")	Jung Yong-hwa, Han Sung-ho	Jung Yong-hwa, Han Seung-hoon	Jung Yong-hwa, Vinyl House	3:29
5.	"La La La" (라라라)	Jung Yong-hwa	Jung Yong-hwa	Jung Yong-hwa, Han Seung-hoon	3:38
6.	"Where You Are" (English version)	Jung Yong-hwa	Jung Yong-hwa	Tamai Kenji, Momota Rui	3:43
Total length:					21:56

Special limited edition – DVD
No.	Title	Length
1.	"Music Video Making" (20 minutes approximately)

Taiwan limited edition version B – DVD
No.	Title	Length
1.	"I'm Sorry" (Music video, with Chinese subtitles)
2.	"Re:Blue album teaser" (version 1)
3.	"Re:Blue album teaser" (version 2)
4.	"Re:Blue album teaser" (Jung Yong-hwa version)
5.	"Re:Blue album teaser" (Lee Jong-hyun version)
6.	"Re:Blue album teaser" (Kang Min-hyuk version)
7.	"Re:Blue album teaser" (Lee Jung-shin version)

== Chart performance ==
On January 12, it was revealed that the album gained a lot of interest in South Korea and Japan, it topped the number one spot on Japan's Tower Records pre-order albums. The mini-album also surpassed the 100,000 mark only with pre-orders in South Korea. In its first day of release, the title track "I'm Sorry" topped all the South Korean music portal charts. The album also dominated the Gaon Charts for 2 weeks in a row.

=== Album ===
Chart	Peak position
Japan Oricon Weekly album chart	21
South Korea Gaon Weekly album chart	1
South Korea Gaon Weekly domestic album chart	1
South Korea Gaon Monthly album chart	3
South Korea Gaon Monthly domestic album chart	3
Billboard World Albums Chart	1
Billboard Heatseekers Albums	22
Taiwan G-Music Weekly Top 20 Combo Chart	8
Taiwan G-Music International Chart	2
Taiwan G-Music Asia Album Chart	1

=== Singles ===
Song	Peak chart position		
Song	KOR Gaon Top200		KOR Billboard
Song	weekly	monthly	KOR Billboard
"I'm Sorry"	2	5	2
"Coffee Shop"	46	118	75
"Myself More Than You"	41	100	48
"The Guy Like Me"	48	107	72
"La La La"	56	136	83
"Where You Are" (English version)	122	—	—
"—" denotes releases that did not chart or were not released in that region.

=== Album sales ===
Country	Chart	Period	Peak position	Sales	Accumulative sales
Japan	Oricon physical sales		#21	11,783+	
South Korea	Gaon physical sales		#1	126,287+	

== Release history ==
Country	Date	Format	Label
South Korea	January 14, 2013	CD, Digital download	FNC Entertainment
Worldwide	January 14, 2013	Digital download	FNC Entertainment
South Korea	February 4, 2013 (special limited edition)	CD	FNC Entertainment
Taiwan	February 20, 2013	CD, Digital download	Warner Music Taiwan
Taiwan	March 8, 2013 (special limited edition)	Version A (CD+A4 Folder), Version B (CD+DVD)	Warner Music Taiwan
Philippines	April 20, 2013	CD	Universal Records
