= Truth (CNBLUE song) =

- Regular Edition cover

Single by CNBLUE

from the album Wave
- Released: April 23, 2014
- Length: 3:38
- Label: Warner Music Japan
- Songwriters: Jung Yong-hwa; miwa; Ryo; Lee Sang-ho

CNBLUE singles chronology
"Can't Stop" (2014)	"Truth" (2014)	"Go Your Way" (2014)

"Truth" is a song by South Korean pop-rock idol band CNBLUE. It was released on April 23, 2014, as their seventh single under Warner Music Japan and 10th single overall in Japan. The song was written by Jung Yong-hwa and miwa, along with Ryo and Lee Sang-ho.

The single was released in four editions: Regular Edition, Limited Editions A and B, and a fan club-only Boice Limited Edition. "Truth" debuted on the weekly Oricon Singles Chart at number four and has sold nearly 40,000 copies since its release. The band embarked on the CNBLUE Spring Live 2014 "Truth" arena tour, where they held three concerts in Yokohama and Osaka.

== Composition ==
"Truth" was written by frontman Jung Yong-hwa and miwa; it was composed by Jung, Ryo, and Lee Sang-ho, the lattermost arranging the song. "Still" delves into the antagonist's inability to "get over his breakup with a lover". Both tracks are love songs.

== Release and promotion ==
"Truth" was announced as CNBLUE's seventh single on March 13, 2014, with a release date of April 23. A 30-second preview of the music video for "Truth" was uploaded on Warner Music Japan's YouTube channel on March 27, 2014. The full music video was published on April 4. The song was released as a digital download on April 9. A music video for the coupling track "Still" was also published on April 15.

"Truth" was released on April 23 in four editions: Regular Edition; Limited Edition A with bonus DVD content that includes multi-angle performance footage of "Blind Love", "Robot", and "Lady" from CNBLUE's Zepp Tour 2013 "Lady" at Zepp Tokyo, the music video for "Truth", and its special feature; Limited Edition B with bonus DVD content that includes performance footage of "Where You Are", "Wake Up", "Let’s Go Crazy", and "Robot" from the band's set at the 2013 Rock in Japan Festival and its special feature; and Boice Limited Edition with bonus DVD content that includes the music video for "Still" and a special feature.

The band embarked on the CNBLUE Spring Live 2014 "Truth" arena tour concerts, which took place from April 29–30 in Yokohama at the Yokohama Arena and on May 20 in Osaka at the Osaka-jō Hall.

== Commercial performance ==
"Truth" sold 27,372 copies in its first day of release and ranked number three on the daily Oricon Singles Chart. On the issue dated May 23, 2014, the single debuted at number four on the weekly Oricon Singles Chart, selling 35,602 copies in its first week. On the same issue date, the song debuted at number seven on the Billboard Japan Hot 100. By the end of its chart run, "Truth" sold 39,826 copies in Japan.

== Track listing ==
Regular and Boice Limited Editions
No.	Title	Lyrics	Music	Arrangement	Length
1.	"Truth"	Jung Yong-hwa, miwa	Jung Yong-hwa, Ryo, Lee Sang-ho	Lee Sang-ho	3:38
2.	"Still"	Jung Yong-hwa, miwa	Jung Yong-hwa, Ryo	Chokkaku	4:13
3.	"Heart Song"	Lee Jong-hyun	Lee Jong-hyun, Kim Jae-yang	Lee Jong-hyun, Vinyl House	3:31
4.	"Truth" (Instrumental)		Jung Yong-hwa, Ryo, Lee Sang-ho	Lee Sang-ho	3:37

Limited Edition A
No.	Title	Lyrics	Music	Arrangement	Length
1.	"Truth"	Jung Yong-hwa, miwa	Jung Yong-hwa, Ryo, Lee Sang-ho	Lee Sang-ho	3:38
2.	"Still"	Jung Yong-hwa, miwa	Jung Yong-hwa, Ryo	Chokkaku	4:13
3.	"Heart Song"	Lee Jong-hyun	Lee Jong-hyun, Kim Jae-yang	Lee Jong-hyun, Vinyl House	3:31
4.	"Still" (Instrumental)		Jung Yong-hwa, Ryo	Chokkaku	4:13

Limited Edition A – bonus DVD content
No.	Title	Length
1.	"Blind Love", "Robot", "Lady" (Zepp Tour 2013 "Lady" @Zepp Tokyo Multi Angle)
2.	"Truth" (music video)
3.	"Truth" (special feature)

Limited Edition B
No.	Title	Lyrics	Music	Arrangement	Length
1.	"Truth"	Jung Yong-hwa, miwa	Jung Yong-hwa, Ryo, Lee Sang-ho	Lee Sang-ho	3:38
2.	"Still"	Jung Yong-hwa, miwa	Jung Yong-hwa, Ryo	Chokkaku	4:13
3.	"Heart Song"	Lee Jong-hyun	Lee Jong-hyun, Kim Jae-yang	Lee Jong-hyun, Vinyl House	3:31
4.	"Heart Song" (Instrumental)		Lee Jong-hyun, Kim Jae-yang	Lee Jong-hyun, Vinyl House	3:31

Limited Edition B – bonus DVD content
No.	Title	Length
1.	"Where You Are", "Wake up", "Let’s Go Crazy", "Robot" (Live from Rock in Japan Festival 2013, special feature)

Boice Limited Edition – bonus DVD content
No.	Title	Length
1.	"Still" (music video)
2.	"Still" (special feature)

== Charts ==
Chart (2016)	Peak position
Billboard Japan Hot 100	7
Oricon Singles Chart	4
