= Can't Stop (CNBLUE song) =

Single by CNBLUE

from the album Can't Stop
- Released: February 24, 2014
- Length: 3:58
- Label: FNC Entertainment
- Songwriter(s): Jung Yong-hwa, Heaven Light

CNBLUE singles chronology
| "I'm Sorry" (2013) | "Can't Stop" (2014) | "Truth" (2014) |

Music video
- "Can't Stop" on YouTube

"Can't Stop" is a song and lead single by South Korean rock band CNBLUE from their fifth Korean mini-album Can't Stop. The music video was released on February 24, 2014.

== Composition ==
"Can't Stop" was composed by CNBLUE vocalist Jung Yong-hwa and Heaven Light.

== Music video ==
The first teaser for the music video was released on February 19, 2014 and the second on February 21, 2014. The full music video was then released on February 24, 2014.
