= Come On (CNBLUE song) =

- Regular edition cover

Single by CN Blue

from the album Code Name Blue
- B-side: "Wake Up"; "My Miracle"
- Released: August 1, 2012
- Recorded: 2012
- Genre: Rock
- Length: 3:31
- Label: Warner Music Japan
- Songwriters: Jung Yong-hwa, Kenji Tamai
- Producer: Lee Jong-hyun

CN Blue Japanese singles chronology
"Where You Are" (2012)	"Come On" (2012)	"Robot" (2012)

"Come On" is a song by the South Korean rock band CN Blue, written by Jung Yong-hwa, translated in Japanese by Kenji Tamai and composed by Lee Jong-hyun. It was released on August 1, 2012 in 3 different editions: CD+DVD, Regular edition and Lawson store limited edition. It is the third major single of the group under Warner Music Japan and their sixth overall.

== Background ==
The single was announced by their Korean label, FNC Media, on June 12, 2012, revealing details about the single. On June 25, it was revealed that the song will be used as opening theme song of TV Asahi's "Music ru TV" during July. On July 2, all single covers, track list and a teaser of the music video were released. At this same day, the first major album of the group in Japan was announced to be released on August 29. The Album will include the songs from the single and the songs from previous 2 singles "Where You Are" and "In My Head".

Every edition of the single will come with a different jacket cover and different features: the CD+DVD edition will include the CD single, a special DVD featuring the music video of "Come On" and a Special feature, a 44-pages photobook, four folded mini-posters, a serial code to unlock a special bonus feature and comes in a sleeve case. The regular edition will come with the CD single and a serial code. The Lawson limited edition will include with the CD single, 5 calendar cards and a serial code. This version will only be sold on Lawson.

== Composition ==
All songs from the single were written by the member Jung Yong-hwa. "Come On" was translated in Japanese by Kenji Tamai and composed by the member Lee Jong-hyun. "Wake Up" was composed by Ryo and Jung Yong-hwa. "My Miracle" was composed by Ryo and Lee Jong-hyun.

== Music video ==
A teaser of the music video was released on July 2, 2012, on Warner Music Japan's YouTube account.

== Track listing ==
All editions:
No.	Title	Lyrics	Music	Arrangement	Length
1.	"Come On"	Jung Yong-hwa, Kenji Tamai (Japanese lyrics translator)	Lee Jong-hyun	Kenji Tamai, Rui Momota	3:31
2.	"Wake Up"	Jung Yong-hwa	Ryo, Jung Yong-hwa	Kenji Tamai, Kousuke Noma	2:59
3.	"My Miracle"	Jung Yong-hwa	Ryo, Lee Jong-hyun		4:03
4.	"Come On" (instrumental)		Lee Jong-hyun	Kenji Tamai, Rui Momota	3:29
Total length:					14:02

DVD
No.	Title	Length
1.	"Come On" (music video)
2.	"Come On" (music video – special feature)

== Chart performance ==
The physical single debuted at number four in Oricon's Daily chart with 16,532 copies sold on the first day and charted at number five in Oricon's Weekly singles chart with 33,911 copies sold in the first week.

=== Charts ===
==== Oricon ====
Released	Oricon Chart	Peak	Debut Sales	Sales Total	Chart Run
August 1, 2012	Daily Singles Chart	4	16,532	39,250+	5 weeks
August 1, 2012	Weekly Singles Chart	5	33,911	39,250+	5 weeks
August 1, 2012	Monthly Singles Chart	24	33,911	39,250+	5 weeks

==== Other charts ====
Chart	Peak position
Billboard Japan Hot 100	8
Billboard Japan Hot Singles sales	5

== Release history ==
Country	Date	Format	Label
Japan	August 1, 2012	CD single, Digital download	Warner Music Japan
