= Blind Love (song) =

- Regular Edition cover

Single by CNBLUE

from the album What Turns You On?
- B-side: "With Your Eyes"; "Greedy Man"
- Released: April 24, 2013
- Recorded: 2012–2013
- Genre: Rock
- Length: 4:04
- Label: Warner Music Japan
- Songwriter: Lee Jong-hyun
- Producers: Lee Jong-hyun; Vinyl House

CNBLUE Japanese singles chronology
"Robot" (2012)	"Blind Love" (2013)	"Lady" (2013)

"Blind Love" is a Japanese-language song by the South Korean rock band CNBLUE, written and produced by Lee Jong-hyun and Vinyl House. It is their fifth major single in Japan under Warner Music Japan and their eighth overall. It was released on April 24, 2013, in 3 different editions.

== Background ==
The single was announced by the group's Korean label, FNC Media, on March 1, via their official Japanese website. On March 27, details about the single were revealed. It will be released in three different editions: two limited with a DVD and a regular CD only edition. Track list and jacket covers were also revealed.

=== Editions ===
The single was released in three editions. Every edition comes with a different instrumental, different enclosed card with a serial code and a lottery ticket for a special event.

- Limited edition type A: This edition includes the CD single, a DVD with the live concert "Music for All, All for One", held at the National Yoyogi Stadium First Gymnasium on December 24, 2012, music video of "Blind Love" with a special feature from the recording of the music video, one lottery ticket for a special event and a serial code type A. This edition includes the instrumental of the song "With Your Eyes".
- Limited edition type B: This edition includes the CD single, a DVD with the special release event of the single "Robot", held in TFT Hall on December 23, 2012, two lottery tickets for a special event and a serial code type B. This edition includes the instrumental of the song "Greedy Man".
- Regular edition: This edition includes the CD single only and the instrumental of the song "Blind Love". First press editions of the single includes three lottery tickets for a special event and a serial code type C.

== Composition ==
The song was written by the member Lee Jong-hyun who also composed the song with Vinyl House. Lee Jong-hyun also wrote and composed the first b-side of the single, the song "With Your Eyes". The member Jung Yong-hwa wrote the second b-side of the single, "Greedy Man", and composed the song with Kim Jae-yang.

== Track listing ==
Regular edition
No.	Title	Lyrics	Music	Arrangement	Length
1.	"Blind Love"	Lee Jong-hyun	Lee Jong-hyun, Vinyl House	Suzuki "Daichi" Hideyuki, Kosuke Oba, Vinyl House, Lee Jong-hyun	4:04
2.	"With Your Eyes"	Lee Jong-hyun	Lee Jong-hyun		3:28
3.	"Greedy Man"	Jung Yong-hwa	Jung Yong-hwa, Kim Jae-yang		3:27
4.	"Blind Love" (instrumental)		Lee Jong-hyun, Vinyl House	Suzuki "Daichi" Hideyuki, Kosuke Oba, Vinyl House, Lee Jong-hyun	4:02
Total length:					15:01

Limited edition type A
No.	Title	Lyrics	Music	Arrangement	Length
1.	"Blind Love"	Lee Jong-hyun	Lee Jong-hyun, Vinyl House	Suzuki "Daichi" Hideyuki, Kosuke Oba, Vinyl House, Lee Jong-hyun
2.	"With Your Eyes"	Lee Jong-hyun	Lee Jong-hyun
3.	"Greedy Man"	Jung Yong-hwa	Jung Yong-hwa, Kim Jae-yang
4.	"With Your Eyes" (instrumental)		Lee Jong-hyun

Limited edition type B
No.	Title	Lyrics	Music	Arrangement	Length
1.	"Blind Love"	Lee Jong-hyun	Lee Jong-hyun, Vinyl House	Suzuki "Daichi" Hideyuki, Kosuke Oba, Vinyl House, Lee Jong-hyun
2.	"With Your Eyes"	Lee Jong-hyun	Lee Jong-hyun
3.	"Greedy Man"	Jung Yong-hwa	Jung Yong-hwa, Kim Jae-yang
4.	"Greedy Man" (instrumental)		Jung Yong-hwa, Kim Jae-yang

DVD – limited edition type A: "Music for All, All for One" Live @ National Yoyogi Stadium First Gymnasium 2012.12.24
No.	Title	Length
1.	"Where You Are"
2.	"Get Away"
3.	"Have a Good Night"
4.	"Wake Up"
5.	"Robot"
6.	"Time is Over"
7.	"In My Head"
8.	"Blind Love" (music video)
9.	"Blind Love" (music video – special feature)

DVD – limited edition type B: "Robot" Release Live @ TFT Hall 2012.12.23
No.	Title	Length
1.	"Robot"
2.	"Get Away"
3.	"The Way part 1 ~one time~"
4.	"Where You Are"
5.	"Time is Over"
6.	"In My Head"

== Charts ==
In its first day of release the physical single debuted at number two in Oricon's daily chart with 35,773 copies sold, the highest first day ever from CNBLUE Japanese releases.

=== Oricon ===
Oricon Chart	Peak	Debut Sales	Sales Total	Chart Run
Daily Singles Chart	2	35,773	54,003+	9 weeks
Weekly Singles Chart	4	47,577	54,003+	9 weeks
Monthly Singles Chart	9	50,141	54,003+	9 weeks

=== Other charts ===
Chart	Peak position
Billboard Japan Hot 100	7
Billboard Japan Hot Singles Sales	4

== Release history ==
Country	Date	Format	Label
Japan	April 24, 2013	CD single, digital download	Warner Music Japan
