= Lady (CNBLUE song) =

Japanese single from South Korean rock band CNBLUE

Single by CNBLUE

from the album What Turns You On?
- B-side: "Don't Care"; "Monday"
- Released: 31 July 2013
- Genre: Jpop, Reggae
- Label: Warner Music Japan
- Songwriters: Jung Yong-hwa; Kosuke Oba
- Producer: Han Sung Ho

CNBLUE singles chronology
| "Blind Love" (2013) | "Lady" (2013) | "Truth" (2014) |

"Lady" is a Japanese single from South Korean rock band CNBLUE, taken from their third Japan album What Turns You On?. It reached a peak position of 7 on the Billboard Japan Hot 100 and 4 on the Oricon Singles Chart. Written by Jung Yong-hwa, the song is about a man proactively approaching a woman and mixes disco influences with rock. CDJournal noted an acid jazz sound in the title track, calling it a "mature song" about "passionately intense love". Beside the standard edition, the single is available in three different limited editions (A and B versions and the FamilyMart-exclusive version, which is housed in a LP-size case), each with a different instrumental track.

== Track list ==
=== Standard Edition ===
The Standard Edition has three songs and an instrumental.

==== CD ====
- #1: Lady
- #2: Do not care
- #3: Monday
- #4: Lady (Instrumental)

=== Family Mart & famima.com Limited Edition ===
The Family Mart & famima.com Limited Edition has three songs and one instrumental.

==== CD ====
- #1: Lady
- #2: Do not care
- #3: Monday
- #4: Lady (Instrumental)

=== Limited Edition A ===
The Limited Edition A has three songs and one instrumental and a DVD with Lady Music Video and Special Feature and Blind Love LIVE.

==== CD ====
- #1: Lady
- #2: Do not care
- #3: Monday
- #4: Do not care (Instrumental)

==== DVD ====
- #1: Lady Music Video
- #2: Lady Special Feature
- #3: "Blind Love" Release LIVE @ NIKKEI Hall 2013.4.27

=== First Press Limited Edition B ===
The Limited Edition B has three songs and one instrumental and a DVD with MY BEAT Stadium LIVE.

==== CD ====
- #1: Lady
- #2: Do not care
- #3: Monday
- #4: Monday (Instrumental)

==== DVD ====
- #1: Mezamashiraibu @ Odaiba United States MY BEAT Stadium 2012.8.28
