= Stay Gold (CNBLUE album) =

- Regular Edition cover

Studio album by CNBLUE
- Released: October 18, 2017
- Length: 38:35
- Language: Japanese, English
- Label: Warner Music Japan

CNBLUE chronology
7°CN (2017)	Stay Gold (2017)	Best of CNBLUE / Our Book [2011-2018] (2018)

Singles from Stay Gold
- 1. "Shake" Released: May 10, 2017; 2. "Starting Over" Released: October 6, 2017

Stay Gold (stylized STAY GOLD) is the sixth major-label Japanese studio album (eighth overall) by South Korean pop-rock idol band CNBLUE. It was released on October 18, 2017, under Warner Music Japan. The album was released in four editions: Regular Edition, Limited Editions A and B, and a fan club-only Boice Limited Edition. It went on to debut at number three on Japan's national weekly Oricon Albums Chart. The band will embark on the CNBLUE 2017 Arena Tour Live "Starting Over" from November to December in Osaka, Tokyo, Fukui, Fukuoka, Aichi, and Kanagawa.

It was the final CNBLUE release to include Jonghyun, who left the band in August 2019.

== Release and promotion ==
CNBLUE released "Shake" as the first single from the album on May 10, 2017. It peaked at number five on the country's national Oricon Singles Chart, charting for four weeks and selling over 26,000 copies domestically. Stay Gold was announced as CNBLUE's sixth studio album on August 29, 2017, with a release date of October 18. A video teaser for the album was concurrently released. A 30-second teaser for the single "Starting Over" was uploaded on September 7, with the full music video was premiered eleven days later on Yahoo! Japan's service GyaO. On September 25, an album digest video was uploaded on YouTube. "Starting Over" was released as a digital download on October 6.

Stay Gold was released in four editions: Regular Edition; Limited Edition A with bonus DVD content that includes the music video and a special feature of "Starting Over"; Limited Edition B with bonus DVD content that includes multi-angle performance footage of "Shake" and "Lie" from the CNBLUE Spring Live 2017 "Shake! Shake!" arena tour; and Boice Limited Edition with "special goods".

The band will embark on the CNBLUE 2017 Arena Tour Live "Starting Over" from November 3 to December 1, 2017. The concerts will take place at the Osaka-jō Hall in Osaka, the Nippon Budokan in Tokyo, the Sun Dome Fukui in Fukui, the Marine Messe Fukuoka arena in Fukuoka, the Nippon Gaishi Hall in Aichi, and the Yokohama Arena in Kanagawa.

== Commercial performance ==
Stay Gold shifted 21,428 copies on its first day of release. On the chart dated October 30, 2017, the album debuted at number three on Japan's weekly national Oricon Albums Chart, selling 28,060 copies in its first week. It also ranked at number three on the Billboard Japan Hot Albums. According to Oricon, the album has sold 30,778 copies domestically since its release.

== Track listing ==
Track listing
No.	Title	Lyrics	Music	Arrangement	Length
1.	"Intro"		Jung Yong-hwa		1:12
2.	"Starting Over"	Jung Yong-hwa	Jung Yong-hwa, Han Seung-hoon, Didrik Thott, David Bjork	David Bjork	3:34
3.	"This Is"	Jung Yong-hwa	Jung Yong-hwa, Han Seung-hoon, Erik Lidbom, Simon Janlov, MLC		3:38
4.	"Captivate"	Lee Jong-hyun	Lee Jong-hyun, Magnus Funemyr, Emil Gotthard	Magnus Funemyr	2:46
5.	"Only Beauty"	Lee Jong-hyun	Lee Jong-hyun, Hasegawa	Tienowa	4:20
6.	"Butterfly"	Jung Yong-hwa, Hasegawa	Jung Yong-hwa	7th Avenue, Tienowa	3:59
7.	"Mirror"	Jung Yong-hwa	Jung Yong-hwa, Kim Jie-yang, Bitcrusher, Bob Sacamano		3:50
8.	"Shake"	Jung Yong-hwa	Jung Yong-hwa, Lee Jong-hyun, Albi Albertsson, Justin Reinstein	Mussashi	2:55
9.	"Seeds"	Lee Jong-hyun	Lee Jong-hyun, Magnus Funemyr	Magnus Funemyr	3:34
10.	"Someone Else"	Jung Yong-hwa, Han Seung-hoon	Jung Yong-hwa, Han Seung-hoon		4:05
11.	"Book"	Jung Yong-hwa	Jung Yong-hwa, Han Seung-hoon, Albi Albertsson, Justin Reinstein	Mussashi	4:42
Total length:					38:35

Limited Edition A — bonus DVD content
No.	Title	Length
1.	"Starting Over" (music video)
2.	"Starting Over" (special feature)

Limited Edition B — bonus DVD content
No.	Title	Length
1.	"Shake" (Spring Live 2017 "Shake! Shake!" @Osaka-jō Hall)
2.	"Lie" (Spring Live 2017 "Shake! Shake!" @Osaka-jo Hall)

== Charts ==
Chart (2017)	Peak position
Billboard Japan Hot Albums	3
Oricon Albums Chart	3
