= Robot (CNBLUE song) =

- Regular edition cover

Single by CN Blue

from the album What Turns You On?
- B-side: "Ring"; "Starlit Night"
- Released: December 19, 2012
- Recorded: 2012
- Genre: Rock
- Length: 3:19
- Label: Warner Music Japan
- Songwriters: Jung Yong-hwa, Kosuke Oba
- Producers: Jung Yong-hwa, Kosuke Oba

CN Blue Japanese singles chronology
| "Come On" (2012) | "Robot" (2012) | "Blind Love" (2013) |

"Robot" is a song by the South Korean rock band CN Blue, written and produced by Jung Yong-hwa and Kosuke Oba. It was released on December 19, 2012 in three different editions as the group's fourth major single under Warner Music Japan and seventh overall. It follows previous singles "Where You Are" and "Come On".

== Background ==
The single was announced by their Korean agency, FNC Media, on November 14 along with the track list of the single and editions. On November 22, an image was released on their Japanese official website, revealing the jacket covers, producers, prices and bonus gifts included in every edition. The song was chosen as opening theme for Nippon Television's TV show Happy Music during December.

=== Editions ===
The single was released in three editions, two limited and a regular edition:

A limited CD+DVD edition, including the CD single and a special DVD with the music video of "Robot", a special feature from the recordings of the music video and performances from the show "Code Name Blue release live at Pacifico Yokohama", realized on September 9, 2012.

A regular CD only edition, including the CD single and a different jacket cover.

A limited Warner Music Direct Store edition, including the CD single in a digipak packaging, a different jacket cover, five christmas cards and a christmas ornament in format of a bell. This edition is only available to purchase on Warner Music Japan's digital store, Warner Music Direct.

== Composition ==
"Robot" was written and produced by the member Jung Yong-hwa and Kosuke Oba, who also helped translating the song to Japanese. "Ring", the first b-side, was also written and produced by Yong-hwa. "Starlit Night", the second b-side, was written and produced by the member Lee Jong-hyun.

== Music video ==
A 30-seconds preview was released on Warner Music Japan's YouTube account on November 26. The full music video premiered on the music TV station Space Shower TV on December 2, 2012.

== Track listing ==
All editions:
| No. | Title | Lyrics | Music | Length |
|---|---|---|---|---|
| 1. | "Robot" | Jung Yong-hwa, Kosuke Oba (Japanese lyrics translator) | Jung Yong-hwa, Kosuke Oba | 3:19 |
| 2. | "Ring" | Jung Yong-hwa | Jung Yong-hwa | 3:57 |
| 3. | "Starlit Night" | Lee Jong-hyun | Lee Jong-hyun | 5:30 |
| 4. | "Robot" (Instrumental) | | Jung Yong-hwa, Kosuke Oba | 3:16 |
| Total length: | | | | 16:02 |

DVD: Code Name Blue release live at Pacifico Yokohama 2012.9.10
| No. | Title | Length |
|---|---|---|
| 1. | "With Me" |
| 2. | "Have a Good Night" |
| 3. | "Wake Up" |
| 4. | "Time is Over" |
| 5. | "In My Head" |
| 6. | "Robot" (Music video) |
| 7. | "Robot" (Music video - Special feature) |

== Charts ==
In its first day of release the physical single debuted at number two in Oricon's daily chart with 24,001 copies sold. In its second day the single sold 11,373 copies, staying at the number two. It debuted at number two on Oricon's weekly chart with 42,563 copies sold on the first week, only behind to Nogizaka46's "Seifuku no Mannequin".

=== Oricon ===
| Released | Oricon Chart | Peak | Debut Sales | Sales Total | Chart Run |
|---|---|---|---|---|---|
| December 19, 2012 | Daily Singles Chart | 2 | 24,001 | 45,640 | 2 weeks |
| December 19, 2012 | Weekly Singles Chart | 2 | 42,563 | 45,640 | 2 weeks |
| December 19, 2012 | Monthly Singles Chart | | | 45,640 | 2 weeks |

== Release history ==
| Country | Date | Format | Label |
|---|---|---|---|
| Japan | December 19, 2012 | CD single, Digital download | Warner Music Japan |
