= What Turns You On? =

- Regular edition cover

Studio album by CNBLUE
- Released: August 28, 2013
- Recorded: 2012–2013
- Genre: Rock
- Length: 40:21
- Language: Japanese English
- Label: Warner Music Japan

CNBLUE chronology
Re:Blue (2013)	What Turns You On? (2013)	Present (2013)

Singles from What Turns You On?
- 1. "Robot" Released: December 19, 2012; 2. "Blind Love" Released: April 21, 2013; 3. "Lady" Released: July 31, 2013

What Turns You On? (stylized What turns you on?) is a Japanese studio album by the South Korean rock band CNBLUE. It was released on August 28, 2013 as the group's fourth Japanese album and their second major album under Warner Music Japan.

== Background ==
The album was announced on July 12, on the group's official website, along with the first details about it. On July 23, jacket covers of all editions of the album were revealed, along with a promotional photo. Track listing of the album was revealed on July 31, containing, in total, eleven songs.

=== Editions ===
The album was released in four editions:

- Limited Edition A (WPZL-30682/3): The limited edition type A includes the CD with 12 songs and a DVD, including three live videos from the concert "a-nation musicweek Charge Go! Weider in Jelly Rock Nation @ Yoyogi National Stadium First Gymnasium", held on August 12, 2012, the music video of the song "One More Time" and making-of from the music video. This edition includes a bonus track, an English version of the song "Robot".
- Limited Edition B (WPZL-30684/5): The limited edition type B includes the CD with standard track list and a DVD, including the special concert "Odaiba United States presents Kira Kira Winter Live", held on December 25, 2012.
- Regular Edition (WPCL-11589): The regular edition of the album includes the CD itself with standard track list.
- FamilyMart and famima.com Limited Edition (WPCL-11590): The FamilyMart and famima.com edition includes the same contests of the regular edition but in an LP-sized package, including a poster of same size. This edition was only sold at FamilyMart stores and at famima.com online store.

== Composition ==
The album comes with eleven songs, three singles, three songs already released on the singles and five new songs. Most part of the songs included on the album were composed and written by the members Jung Yong-hwa and Lee Jong-hyun. Yong-hwa wrote and composed the songs "Lady", "One More Time", "Change", "Don't Care", "Greedy Man", "Robot" (both Japanese and English versions) and "Let Me Know", while Jong-hyun wrote and composed the songs "Blind Love", "Crying Out", "I Can't Believe" and "Starlit Night".

== Singles ==
Three songs from the album were released as singles:

The first single, "Robot", was released on December 19, 2012. The song was originally written by the member Yong-hwa, with Japanese translation by Kosuke Oba. The physical single ranked number 2 on Oricon's singles chart, selling 42,563 in its first week and charted for seven weeks. The song "Starlit Night", one of the b-sides included of the single, was included on the album as track #10. An English version of the song was included as bonus track of the limited edition type A.

The second single, "Blind Love", was released on April 24, 2013. The song was written by Jong-hyun and composed by Jong-hyun and Vinyl House. The physical single ranked number 4 on Oricon's singles chart, selling 47,577 copies in its first week, charting for nine weeks. The song "Greedy Man", one of the b-sides of the single, was included on the album as track #6.

The third and final single of the album, "Lady", was released on July 31, 2013. The song was written by Yong-hwa with Kosube Oba and composed by Yong-hwa and Park Hyun-woo. The physical single ranked at number 4 on Oricon's singles chart, selling 42,169 in its first week. The song "Don't Care", first b-side of the single, was included on the album as track #5.

== Track listing ==
Standard Track list
No.	Title	Lyrics	Music	Length
1.	"Lady"	Jung Yong-hwa, Kosuke Oba	Jung Yong-hwa, Park Hyun-woo	3:21
2.	"One More Time"	Jung Yong-hwa, Kosuke Oba	Jung Yong-hwa, Ryo	3:12
3.	"Change"	Jung Yong-hwa	Jung Yong-hwa, Ryo, Vinyl House	3:16
4.	"Blind Love"	Lee Jong-hyun	Lee Jong-hyun, Vinyl House	4:04
5.	"Don't Care"	Jung Yong-hwa	Jung Yong-hwa	3:27
6.	"Greedy Man"	Jung Yong-hwa	Jung Yong-hwa, Kim Jae-yang	3:27
7.	"Robot"	Jung Yong-hwa, Kosuke Oba (Japanese translator)	Jung Yong-hwa, Kosuke Oba	3:19
8.	"Crying Out"	Lee Jong-hyun	Lee Jong-hyun, Ryo	3:47
9.	"I Can't Believe"	Lee Jong-hyun	Lee Jong-hyun, Kim Jae-yang	3:22
10.	"Starlit Night"	Lee Jong-hyun	Lee Jong-hyun	5:30
11.	"Let Me Know"	Jung Yong-hwa	Jung Yong-hwa, Ryo, Vinyl House	3:37
Total length:				40:21

Limited Edition Type A bonus track:
No.	Title	Lyrics	Music	Length
12.	"Robot" (English version)	Jung Yong-hwa	Jung Yong-hwa, Kosuke Oba	3:17
Total length:				43:37

DVD (Limited Edition type A): a-nation musicweek Charge Go! Weider in Jelly Rock Nation @ Yoyogi National Stadium First Gymnasium 2012.8.12
No.	Title	Length
1.	"Hey You"
2.	"Kimio"
3.	"In My Head"
4.	"One More Time" (Music video)
5.	"One More Time" (Music video - Special feature)

DVD (Limited Edition type B): Odaiba United States presents Kira Kira Winter Live 2012.12.25
No.	Title	Length
1.	"Have a Good Night"
2.	"Wake Up"
3.	"Where You Are"
4.	"The Way part 1 ~One Time~"
5.	"Robot"
6.	"Time is Over"

== Chart performance ==
=== Oricon ===
Oricon chart	Peak	Debut sales	Sales total
Daily Albums Chart	2	26,921	43,492+
Weekly Albums Chart	2	43,492	43,492+

== Release history ==
Country	Date	Format	Label
Japan	August 28, 2013	CD, Digital download	Warner Music Japan
