= Lee Jung-shin =

South Korean bassist and actor

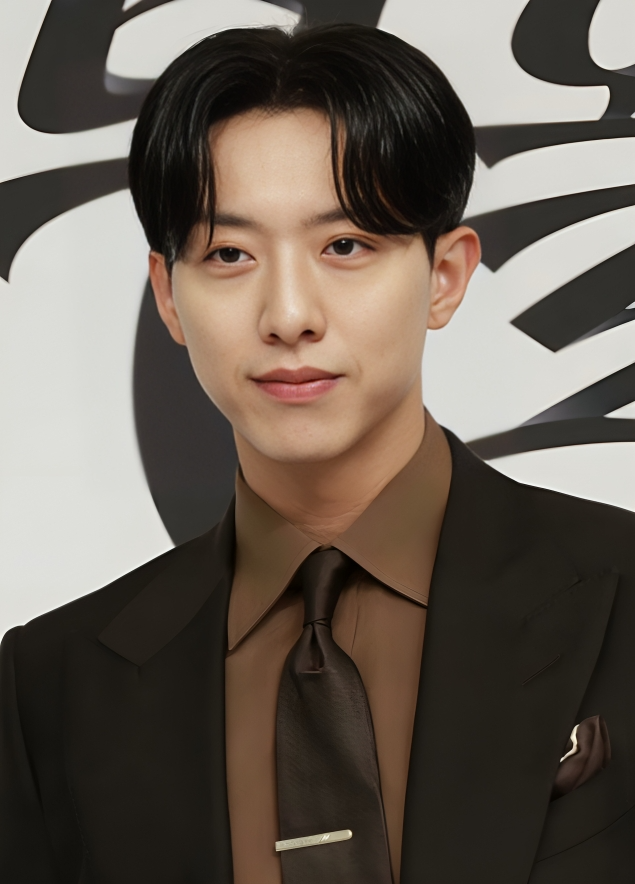
- Lee in March 2024
- Born: September 15, 1991 (age 35); Ilsan, South Korea
- Occupations: Bassist; singer; rapper; actor; presenter
- Years active: 2009–present
- Musical career
- Genres: Rock; pop; R&B
- Instruments: Bass; vocals
- Label: FNC Entertainment
- Member of: CNBLUE
- Website: fncent.com

Korean name
- Hangul: 이정신
- Hanja: 李正信
- RR: I Jeongsin
- MR: I Chŏngsin

Lee Jung-shin (Korean: 이정신; born September 15, 1991), known mononymously as Jungshin, is a South Korean musician, singer, rapper, and actor. He is the bassist of South Korean rock band CNBLUE, which debuted in January 2010 in South Korea.

== Life and career ==
=== Early life and career beginning ===
Lee Jung-shin was born on September 15, 1991 in Seoul. His family consists of his parents and an older brother. His family lives in Ilsan, and he finished high school at Jung Bal High School in Ilsan.

Lee trained under FNC Entertainment in 2009, and in September of that year joined CNBLUE as a bassist, replacing Kwon Kwang-jin who left the band shortly after debut. Aside from being the band's bassist, he also serves as a rapper and backup vocalist.

=== Solo career ===
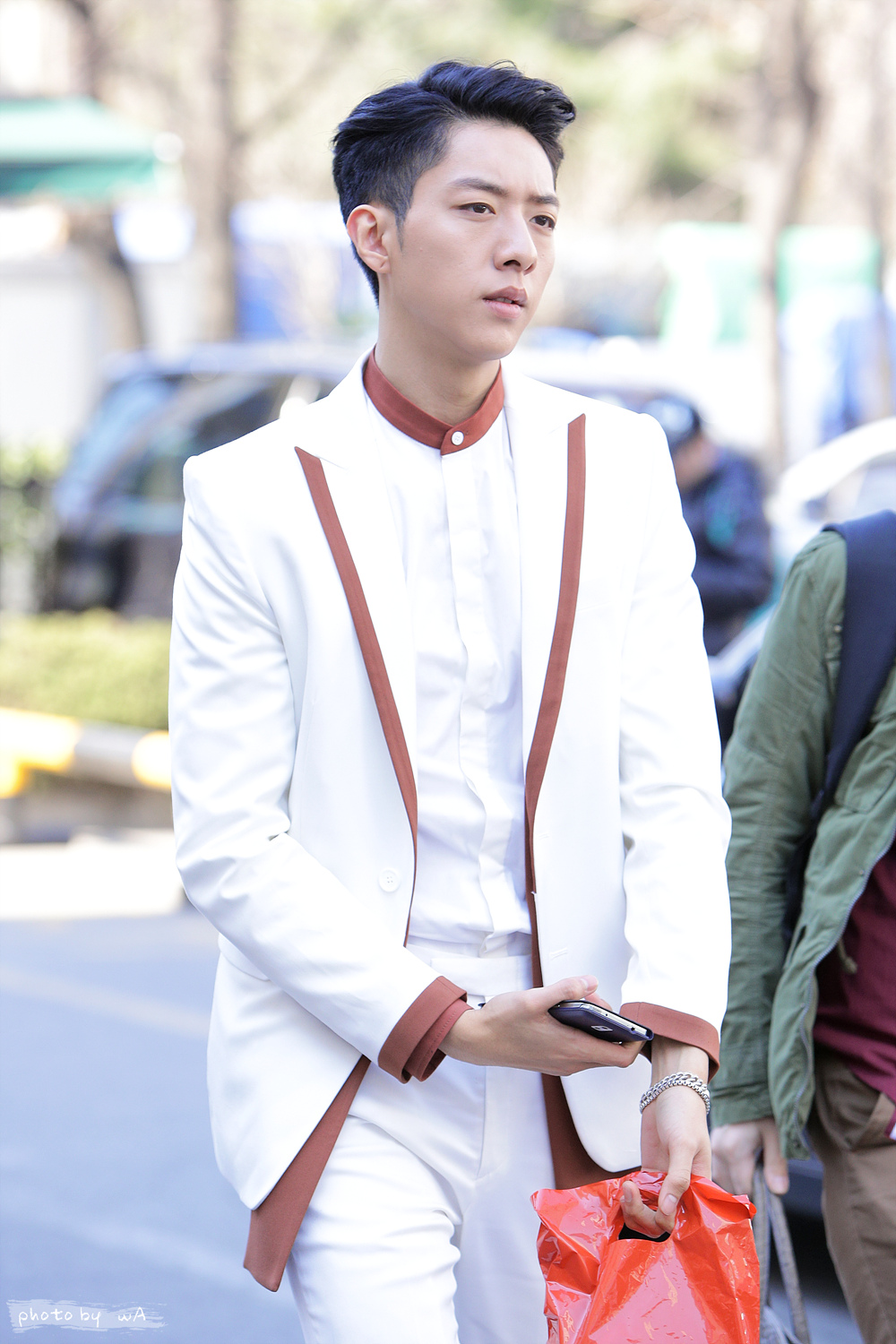
Lee at Music Bank, 2014

Lee made his acting debut in 2012 KBS2 family drama Seoyoung, My Daughter. It recorded a peak viewership rating of 47.6%, making it the highest rated Korean drama of 2013. Lee received praise for his performance, and garnered several "Best New Actor" nominations from local award giving bodies.

Lee was subsequently cast in supporting roles in sageuk The Blade and Petal (2013) and melodrama Temptation (2014); the later won him his first acting award, as "Best New Rising Star" at the 3rd DramaFever Awards.

In 2015, Lee played his first leading role in the KBS2 drama special Thank You, My Son. The same year, he became a host of Mnet's M Countdown alongside Key of SHINee. He subsequently left the show in 2016.

In 2016, Lee starred alongside Jung Il-woo and Park So-dam in tvN's romantic comedy, Cinderella with Four Knights. He released his first solo single, "Confession" for the drama's soundtrack.

In 2017, Lee starred in historical romance drama, My Sassy Girl. The same year, he was cast in fantasy romance drama Longing Heart. This marks his first lead role.

International Network of Street Papers announced Lee's photo has been included in the Top 5 nominees for INSP Awards for Best Photograph on June 7, 2019. Lee took photos from LOVE FNC Foundation's volunteer movement in Myanmar last February 2018 and contributed these photos exclusively to The Big Issue Korea for free. The winner was announced on INSP Awards Ceremony which held as part of the Global Street Paper Summit in Hannover, Germany, on June 19.

On July 22, 2019, Lee released his Japanese single, Blue Orion. He then dropped the album with this song and four more Japanese tracks on September 25.

In March 2021, Lee made his acting comeback following his military discharge in the web series, Summer Guys. The series aired on KT Seezn, AbemaTV, and Viu.

In September 2021, Lee was cast in the drama, Sh**ting Stars alongside Lee Sung-Kyung and Kim Young-dae.

== Philanthropy ==
Lee held a charitable photo exhibition along with his brother, Lee Yong Shin from June 1 to 10, 2018, at Canon Gallery, Seoul Gangnam Canon Plex B1/F, 829 Seolleung Road. The exhibition entitled, We Blew Away Dandelion Puffs, captured the moments from their visit to the fourth LOVE FNC School in Kalaw and YWAM day care center in Yangon in Myanmar last February. They were with AOA's Kim Seol Hyun as part of a project organized by LOVE FNC Foundation. The framed photographs, postcards, and posters are for sale. The proceeds will be donated to fund a scholarship program in Myanmar.

On April 7, 2019, Hope Bridge National Disaster Relief Association reported Lee donated 10 million won for the victims of forest fires in Gangwon Province.

On October 25, 2021, Lee along with Korean photographer, Alex Kim held a V Live to support Alex Primary School Surongo in the Himalayas. The broadcast is partnered with LOVE FNC Foundation and Naver's Happybean Foundation.

== Personal life ==
=== Military service ===
Lee enlisted in his military service on July 31, 2018. He finished his basic military training, posting his photos on his personal Instagram account on September 5. Lee hosted the Armed Forces Festival on October 8. The event was held from October 5 to 9. He was also the emcee for the military music concert, celebrating the 70th Anniversary of soldier establishment on October 10. Lee was officially discharged from his military service on March 19, 2020, without returning to his base from his ETS leave according to the Ministry of National Defense's policy.

== Discography ==
=== Soundtracks appearances ===
Title	Year	Peak chart positions	Sales	Album
Title	Year	KOR	Sales	Album
"Confession" (Korean: 고백; RR: Gobaek)	2016	—		Cinderella with Four Knights OST
"—" denotes releases that did not chart or were not released in that region.

=== Songwriting and production credits ===
Year	Album	Artist	Song	Label	Lyrics		Music	
Year	Album	Artist	Song	Label	Credited	With	Credited	With
2015	Colors	CNBLUE	"Daisy"	FNC Entertainment	Yes	—N/a	Yes	Jung Yong-hwa
2015	2gether	CNBLUE	"Control"	FNC Entertainment	Yes	—	No	—
2016	Blueming	CNBLUE	"Without You"	FNC Entertainment	Yes	Kim Jae-yang	Yes	Han Seung-hoon
2017	7°CN	CNBLUE	"Manito"	FNC Entertainment	Yes	Jung Yong-hwa	Yes	Han Seung-hoon, Ko Jin-yeong
2021	Wanted	CNBLUE	"Hold Me Back"	FNC Entertainment	Yes	Han Seung-hoon	Yes	Han Seung-hoon, Dunk

== Filmography ==
=== Television series ===
Year	Title	Role	Notes	Ref.
2012	My Husband Got a Family	Himself	Cameo	
2012	Seoyoung, My Daughter	Kang Sung-jae		
2013	The Blade and Petal	Shi-woo		
2014	Temptation	Na Hong-gyu		
2015	KBS Drama Special – Thank You, My Son	Jang Shi-woo	one act-drama	
2015	A Girl Who Sees Smells	Himself	Cameo (episode 6)	
2016	Cinderella with Four Knights	Kang Seo-woo		
2017	My Sassy Girl	Kang Joon-young		
2018	My First Love	Kang Shin-woo		
2018	Voice	Lee Jae-Il	Cameo (season 2, episode 8)	
2022	Shooting Stars	Do Soo-hyuk		
2024	The Escape of the Seven	Hwang Chan-sung	Season 2	

=== Web series ===
Year	Title	Role	Ref.
2021	Summer Guys	Seon Woo-chan	

=== Television shows ===
Year	Title	Role	Notes	Ref.
2015	Shaolin Clenched Fist	Main cast		
2015	Fashion King Korea	Main cast		
2015–2016	M Countdown	Host		
2022–2023	Golf Battle: Birdie Buddies	Contestant	Season 4–5	

== Awards and nominations ==
Name of the award ceremony, year presented, category, nominee of the award, and the result of the nomination
Award ceremony	Year	Category	Nominee / Work	Result	Ref.
Asia Artist Awards	2016	New Actor Award	Lee Jung-shin	Won	
Baeksang Arts Awards	2013	Best New Actor – Television	Seoyoung, My Daughter	Nominated	
Baeksang Arts Awards	2013	Most Popular Actor – Television	Seoyoung, My Daughter	Nominated	
KBS Drama Awards	2012	Best New Actor	Seoyoung, My Daughter	Nominated	
Korea Drama Awards	2013	Best New Actor	Seoyoung, My Daughter	Nominated	
SBS Drama Awards	2017	Best New Actor	My Sassy Girl	Nominated	
