= Euphoria (CNBLUE album) =

- Regular Edition cover

Studio album by CNBLUE
- Released: October 19, 2016
- Recorded: 2016
- Genre: Rock
- Length: 39:43
- Language: Japanese, English
- Label: Warner Music Japan

CNBLUE chronology
| Blueming (2016) | Euphoria (2016) | 7°CN (2017) |

Singles from Euphoria
- 1. "Puzzle" Released: May 11, 2016; 2. "Glory Days" Released: October 5, 2016

Euphoria (stylized EUPHORIA) is the fifth major-label Japanese studio album (seventh overall) by South Korean pop-rock idol band CNBLUE. It was released on October 19, 2016, under Warner Music Japan. The date marks the five-year anniversary of the band's debut with its record label.

Euphoria was released in four editions: Regular Edition, Limited Editions A and B, and a fan club-only Boice Limited Edition. It went on to debut at number two on the weekly Oricon Albums Chart. The band embarked on the CNBLUE 5th Anniversary Arena Tour 2016 "Our Glory Days" throughout November in Chiba, Osaka, Aichi, Fukuoka, and Tokyo.

== Background ==
CNBLUE announced Euphoria as its fifth studio album on the September 5, 2016 broadcast of Abema TV's Fresh!, with a release date of October 19. The date marks the five-year anniversary since the band's major-label debut in Japan with "In My Head". The album serves as the gratitude the band holds for its fans since then.

== Music structure ==
In "Glory Days", CNBLUE expresses gratitude towards its fans. The lyrics encourage one to "keep going on despite being lost on the path". Dealing with the future, "Take Me Higher" conveys the band's sentiment of exceeding its potential. Drummer Kang Min-hyuk described "Face to Face" as "good rhythmic song" and compared it to previously released songs "With Me" (Code Name Blue) and "Don't Care" (What Turns You On?). "Puzzle" is a wedding-themed song that revolves around "eternal love". "Royal Rumble" compromises a "rhythmical tone" and deals with "the next stop" for the band. The song revolves around the battle royals depicted in the professional wrestling organization WWE. Frontman Jung Yong-hwa described it as a general idea, in which he remarked, "anyone has to keep fighting, right?". Similar to "Daisy" (Colors), "Stay with Me" shows the band's thankfulness to its fans.

In an interview with EMTG Music, the interviewer noted the positivity in the Euphoria singles, in contrast to singles released in the years prior which dealt with "conflicts and anxiety". In response, Jung stated: "When you listen to positive music, it makes you feel good, right? Now I wish more that you would listen to our music and become happy. Before, when something doesn't work out the way I want, I would turn that into a song. Now, it also plays a big part that I have a very happy environment when making music."

== Release and promotion ==
CNBLUE released "Puzzle" as the first single from the album on May 11, 2016. It debuted at number four on the weekly Oricon Singles Chart; the single charted for four weeks and went on to sell over 30,000 copies by the end of its chart run. The music video for "Glory Days" was uploaded on CNBLUE's YouTube channel on September 12. An album digest was uploaded onto the channel four days later. "Glory Days" was released as a digital download on October 5.

Euphoria was released in four editions: Regular Edition; Limited Edition A with bonus DVD content that includes the music video for "Glory Days" and a special feature; Limited Edition B with bonus DVD content that includes multi-angle performance footage of "Puzzle" and "Take Me Higher" from CNBLUE's Spring Live 2016: We're Like a Puzzle concerts; and Boice Limited Edition with bonus DVD content that includes performance footage of "Domino", "Hide and Seek", "Irony", "Realize", "Radio", and "Hold My Hand" from the CNBLUE Japan Major Debut 5th Anniversary Fan Meeting 2016: BoiceTation.

The band embarked on the CNBLUE 5th Anniversary Arena Tour 2016 "Our Glory Days" from November 2 to November 29, 2016. The concerts took place at the Makuhari Messe Event Hall in Chiba, the Osaka-jō Hall in Osaka, the Nippon Gaishi Hall in Aichi, the Marine Messe Fukuoka arena in Fukuoka, and the Nippon Budokan in Tokyo. Performing 22 songs at each concert, the tour accumulated 75,000 attendees in total. The November 18 show in Aichi was recorded and is scheduled to air on WOWOW on January 15, 2017.

== Commercial performance ==
Euphoria sold 26,401 copies in its first day of release and ranked number one on the daily Oricon Albums Chart. It went on to debut at number two on the weekly chart, selling 32,944 copies in its first week. On the chart dated October 31, 2016, Euphoria debuted at number four on the Billboard Japan Hot Albums and Top Albums Sales charts. By the end of its chart run, the album sold 36,074 copies in the country.

== Track listing ==
All editions
| No. | Title | Lyrics | Music | Arrangement | Length |
|---|---|---|---|---|---|
| 1. | "Be OK" | Lee Jong-hyun | Lee Jong-hyun, Jung Jin-wook | Jung Jin-wook | 3:42 |
| 2. | "Glory Days" | Jung Yong-hwa | Jung Yong-hwa, Erik Lidbom, Youwich | Youwich, Ritsuo Mitsui | 4:30 |
| 3. | "Take Me Higher" | Jung Yong-hwa, Takashi Ogawa | Jung Yong-hwa, Han Seung-hoon, Ko Jin-yeong | Shōgo Ōnishi | 4:02 |
| 4. | "Face to Face" | Jung Yong-hwa | Jung Yong-hwa, Han Seung-hoon | Juvenile, Yoshio Fujita | 3:57 |
| 5. | "Puzzle" | Jung Yong-hwa | Jung Yong-hwa, Han Seung-hoon, Ko Jin-yeong | Han Seung-hoon, Ko Jin-yeong | 3:34 |
| 6. | "Royal Rumble" | Jung Yong-hwa, miwa | Jung Yong-hwa | Noriyuki Inoue | 5:11 |
| 7. | "Every Time" | Lee Jong-hyun | Lee Jong-hyun | Ritsuo Mitsui | 3:15 |
| 8. | "Stay with Me" | Lee Jung-shin, Ume | Lee Jung-shin, Kim Jae-yang, Park Hyun-woo | Kim Jae-yang, Park Hyun-woo | 3:47 |
| 9. | "Slaves" | Lee Jong-hyun | Lee Jong-hyun, Ko Jin-yeong | Ko Jin-yeong | 3:02 |
| 10. | "Blessed" | Lee Jong-hyun | Lee Jong-hyun, Han Seung-hoon | Jung Jin-wook, Park Hyun-woo | 4:43 |
| Total length: | | | | | 39:43 |

Limited Edition A — bonus DVD content
| No. | Title | Length |
|---|---|---|
| 1. | "Glory Days" (music video) |
| 2. | "Glory Days" (special feature) |

Limited Edition B — bonus DVD content
| No. | Title | Length |
|---|---|---|
| 1. | "Puzzle", "Take Me Higher" (Spring Live 2016: We're Like a Puzzle" @ Nippon Budokan (multi angle)) |

Boice Limited Edition — bonus DVD content
| No. | Title | Length |
|---|---|---|
| 1. | "Domino", "Hide and Seek", "Irony", "Realize", "Radio", "Hold My Hand" (CNBLUE Japan Major Debut 5th Anniversary Official Fan Meeting 2016: BoiceTation [special live]) |

== Charts ==
| Chart (2016) | Peak position |
|---|---|
| Billboard Japan Hot Albums | 4 |
| Billboard Japan Top Albums Sales | 4 |
| Oricon Albums Chart | 2 |
