= Puzzle (CNBLUE song) =

- Regular Edition cover

Single by CNBLUE

from the album Euphoria
- Released: May 11, 2016
- Genre: Alternative rock, synthpop
- Length: 3:34
- Label: Warner Music Japan
- Songwriters: Jung Yong-hwa, Han Seung-hoon, Ko Jin-yeong

CNBLUE singles chronology
"You're So Fine" (2016)	"Puzzle" (2016)	"Glory Days" (2016)

"Puzzle" is a song by South Korean pop rock band CNBLUE. It was released on May 11, 2016, as their 10th single under Warner Music Japan and 13th single overall in Japan. The song was written by lead vocalist Jung Yong-hwa. Revolving around the theme of a wedding, "Puzzle" deals with the idea of "eternal love".

The single was released in four editions: Regular Edition, Limited Editions A and B, and a fan club-only Boice Limited Edition. "Puzzle" debuted on the weekly Oricon Singles Chart at number four and has sold over 30,000 copies since its release. The band embarked on the CNBLUE Spring Live 2016 "We're Like a Puzzle" arena tour, where they held four concerts in Aichi, Tokyo, and Osaka.

== Background ==
Due to the band's fifth anniversary since its major-label debut in Japan, Jung took interest in composing a song about marriage. With the idea of making a "flashy" lead single, he decided to write a "catchy" track. In crafting the song, Jung sought to create "pop melodies and lyrics with a story, but also linked to the visual, such as a CD jacket and music video".

"Puzzle" was announced as CNBLUE's 10th single on March 6, 2016, with a release date of May 11. It serves as commemoration for the band's major-label debut five years prior.

== Composition ==
"Puzzle" was written by vocalist Jung Yong-hwa, and Japanese-language translations were provided by Hasegawa. The song was composed by Jung, Han Seung-hoon, and Ko Jin-yeong; it was arranged by the latter two. Described as a "bright" alternative rock and synthpop track, it is the band's first wedding-themed song; the lyrics revolves around "eternal love". He described the arrangement of the song as being "60% upper band sound and 40% dance music".

The single was accompanied by two coupling tracks. "Take Me Higher" was written by Jung and Takashi Ogawa. Likewise, the song was composed by Jung, Han, and Ko; it was arranged by Shogo Ohnishi. Lyrically, the songs conveys the band's sentiment of exceeding its potential. "Be My Lover" was written by Lee Jong-hyun, who also composed the track alongside Kim Jae-yang and Park Hyun-woo; it was arranged by the latter two. Additional guitars were provided by Lee Tae-wook and Park, and additional bass provided by Ko. In order to express its "poetic sentiment", the song is sung entirely in English to capture the "emotions, feelings, and delicate nuances" of the lyrics. All three songs were recorded in Seoul at the FNC Entertainment Studio.

== Release and promotion ==
The music video for "Puzzle" was scheduled to be broadcast on Tokyo Broadcasting System Television's variety show Ōsama no Brunch (王様のブランチ」に) on April 16, but was postponed following the Kumamoto earthquake earlier that day. Instead, a 90-second preview was released on Yahoo! Japan's video on demand service GyaO later that day. The full music video was uploaded onto YouTube two days later. The title track was released as a digital download on May 4. This was followed by the release of a video digest for the single on the subsequent day.

"Puzzle" was released on May 11 in four editions: Regular Edition; Limited Edition A with bonus DVD content that includes multi-angle performance footage of CNBLUE's Spring Love 2015 "White" concert that took place at the Yokohama Arena, the music video for the single, and a special feature; Limited Edition B with bonus DVD content that includes performance footage of the 2016 Arena Tour "Be a Supernova" concert that took place at the Osaka-jō Hall; and Boice Limited Edition with bonus DVD content that includes performance footage of "Let's Go Crazy", "Heart Song", "Stay Sober", "Foxy", "White", and "Radio" from the CNBLUE Official Fan Meeting 2015 Boice "Natsu Matsuri" event, and the Boice Special Movie "Bouquet Making".

The band embarked on the CNBLUE Spring Live 2016 "We're Like a Puzzle" arena tour concerts, which began on May 22 in Aichi at the Nippon Gaishi Hall, and continued through May 26–27 in Tokyo at Nippon Budokan, and on May 31 in Osaka at the Osaka-jō Hall. Performing 22 songs at each concert, the tour accumulated 40,000 attendees in total.

== Chart performance ==
"Puzzle" sold 21,304 copies in its first day of release and ranked number three on the daily Oricon Singles Chart. On the issue dated May 23, 2016, the single debuted at number four on the weekly Oricon Singles Chart, selling 28,691 copies in its first week. On the same issue date, the song debuted at number 15 on the Billboard Japan Hot 100. It has sold 30,701 copies in the country since its release.

== Track listing ==
Regular and Boice Limited Editions
No.	Title	Lyrics	Music	Arrangement	Length
1.	"Puzzle"	Jung Yong-hwa	Jung Yong-hwa, Han Seung-hoon, Ko Jin-yeong	Han Seung-hoon, Ko Jin-yeong	3:34
2.	"Take Me Higher"	Jung Yong-hwa, Takashi Ogawa	Jung Yong-hwa, Han Seung-hoon, Ko Jin-yeong	Shogo Ohnishi	4:02
3.	"Be My Love"	Lee Jong-hyun	Lee Jong-hyun, Kim Jae-yang, Park Hyun-woo	Kim Jae-yang, Park Hyun-woo	3:47
4.	"Puzzle" (Instrumental)		Jung Yong-hwa, Han Seung-hoon, Ko Jin-yeong	Han Seung-hoon, Ko Jin-yeong	3:34

Limited Edition A
No.	Title	Lyrics	Music	Arrangement	Length
1.	"Puzzle"	Jung Yong-hwa	Jung Yong-hwa, Han Seung-hoon, Ko Jin-yeong	Han Seung-hoon, Ko Jin-yeong	3:34
2.	"Take Me Higher"	Jung Yong-hwa, Takashi Ogawa	Jung Yong-hwa, Han Seung-hoon, Ko Jin-yeong	Shogo Ohnishi	4:02
3.	"Be My Lover"	Lee Jong-hyun	Lee Jong-hyun, Kim Jae-yang, Park Hyun-woo	Kim Jae-yang, Park Hyun-woo	3:47
4.	"Take Me Higher" (Instrumental)		Jung Yong-hwa, Han Seung-hoon, Ko Jin-yeong	Shogo Ohnishi	4:02

Limited Edition A – bonus DVD content
No.	Title	Length
1.	"Spring Love 2015 'White' @Yokohama Arena" (Multi Angle)
2.	"Puzzle" (music video and special feature)

Limited Edition B
No.	Title	Lyrics	Music	Arrangement	Length
1.	"Puzzle"	Jung Yong-hwa	Jung Yong-hwa, Han Seung-hoon, Ko Jin-yeong	Han Seung-hoon, Ko Jin-yeong	3:34
2.	"Take Me Higher"	Jung Yong-hwa, Takashi Ogawa	Jung Yong-hwa, Han Seung-hoon, Ko Jin-yeong	Shogo Ohnishi	4:02
3.	"Be My Lover"	Lee Jong-hyun	Lee Jong-hyun, Kim Jae-yang, Park Hyun-woo	Kim Jae-yang, Park Hyun-woo	3:47
4.	"Be My Lover" (Instrumental)		Lee Jong-hyun, Kim Jae-yang, Park Hyun-woo	Kim Jae-yang, Park Hyun-woo	3:47

Limited Edition B – bonus DVD content
No.	Title	Length
1.	"2016 Arena Tour "Be a Supernova" @Osaka-jō Hall" (Multi Angle)

Boice Limited Edition – bonus DVD content
No.	Title	Length
1.	"Let's Go Crazy", "Heart Song", "Stay Sober", "Foxy", "White", "Radio" (Live from CNBLUE Official Fan Meeting 2015 Boice "Natsu Matsuri")
2.	"Boice Special Movie 'Bouquet Making'"

== Credits and personnel ==
Credits adapted from the single's liner notes.

- CNBLUE – background vocals
- Jung Yong-hwa – guitar, vocals, lyricist, composer
- Kang Min-hyuk – drums
- Lee Jong-hyun – guitar, vocals, lyricist, composer
- Lee Jung-shin – bass
- Han Seung-hoon – composer, arranger
- Hasegawa – lyricist
- Kenichi 'NK-1' Nakamura – mixing engineer
- Kim Jae-yang – composer, arranger
- Ko Jin-yeong – composer, arranger, bass
- Lee Tae-wook – guitar
- Lee Yu-jin – mixing engineer
- Park Hyun-woo – composer, arranger, guitar
- Shogo Ohnishi – arranger
- Takashi Ogawa – lyricist

== Charts ==
Chart (2016)	Peak position
Billboard Japan Hot 100	15
Oricon Singles Chart	4
