= Colors (CNBLUE album) =

Studio album by CNBLUE
- Released: September 30, 2015
- Recorded: 2015
- Genre: Pop rock
- Length: 40:37
- Languages: Japanese, English
- Label: Warner Music Japan

CNBLUE chronology
2gether (2015)	Colors (2015)	Blueming (2016)

Singles from Colors
- 1. "White" Released: April 8, 2015; 2. "Supernova" Released: September 9, 2015

Colors (stylized colors) is the fourth major-label Japanese studio album (sixth overall) by South Korean pop rock band CNBLUE. It was released on September 30, 2015, under Warner Music Japan. After releasing the first single "White", the band decided to continue with the theme of color to showcase musical variety through the album. "Supernova" was released as the album's promotional single in September.

Colors was released in four editions: Regular Edition, Limited Editions A and B, and a fan club-only Boice Limited Edition. It went on to debut at number one on the weekly Oricon Albums Chart, the first time in over three years since CNBLUE topped the chart. The band embarked on the CNBLUE 2015 Arena Tour: Be a Supernova from November to December in Nagano, Tokyo, Aichi, Fukui, and Osaka.

== Background ==
Colors was announced as CNBLUE's fourth studio album on July 24, 2015, with a release date of September 30. The title is meant to indicate the array of "colorful music" included on the album. After releasing "White", the band decided to continue the theme to showcase more of its musical color. Vocalist Jung Yong-hwa compared the album's varying musical styles to a rainbow. In discussion of the album, guitarist Lee Jong-hyun described that there is no significant difference between CNBLUE's previous album Wave. He explained that, "I don't usually try to change... with time, the piece will naturally change." He noted that the band "played around with sounds", pointing out development in that area; musically, "it's still simple". He felt that the key point of the album was to appeal to a broad audience and be easy to listen to. In midst of his solo activities, Jung Yong-hwa took opportunities to record phrases and sounds before forming them into new songs.

== Music structure ==
"Supernova" is a rock song accompanied by guitar riffs and a synthesizer with an "analog feeling". Jung Yong-hwa wrote the song with Star Wars, and the general idea of the silence in outer space, in his mind. He elaborated, stating: "When I watch films that portray the universe, it opens up a space in there with only me inside... I wanted to express that space of quiet tranquility as the universe. That was the thought." "White" is an electronic rock song that also features a synthesizer. "Irony" is a song that pertains to a couple that no longer love each other, but reject the idea of a breakup as a result of the empathy felt for one another. A jazz pop song, "Hold My Hands" was previously recorded in Korean for CNBLUE's studio album 2gether. Writing the lyrics first, Jung Yong-hwa set out to "portray this speechless feeling of being moved at the heart" in a subtle manner. "Daisy" was co-composed by bassist Lee Jung-shin, his first contribution in that area since joining the band. He composed the song using a guitar, which he played it for Jung Yong-hwa while seeking guidance. After implementing suggested changes, Lee Jung-shin wrote the lyrics.

== Promotion ==
CNBLUE released "White" as the first single from the album on April 8, 2015. It debuted at number four on the weekly Oricon Singles Chart; the singled charted for five weeks and sold over 28,000 copies since its release.

On September 3, an album digest was uploaded by Warner Music Japan. CNBLUE was a guest on Tokyo Broadcasting System Television's (TBS) variety show Ōsama no Brunch (王様のブランチ」に; King's Brunch) on the September 5 broadcast, where the music video for "Supernova" was premiered. The song was released as a digital download on September 9. In order to promote the album, the band performed "Supernova" on TV Asahi's music show Music Station.

Colors was released on September 30, 2015, in four editions: Regular Edition; Limited Edition A with bonus DVD content that includes the music video for "Supernova", a special feature, and individual filming scenes for each member; Limited Edition B with bonus DVD content that includes performance footage of "Ryu Can Do It", "In My Head", "Wake up", "Coffee Shop", "I'm Sorry" from the first half of the band's set at the 2014 Rock Nation festival on August 15; and Boice Limited Edition with bonus DVD content that includes performance footage of "Lady" and "Can't Stop" from the second half of the band's set at the 2014 Rock Nation festival on August 15, and the Digest from Boice Natsumatsuri 2015.

The band embarked on the CNBLUE 2015 Arena Tour: Be a Supernova from November 3 to December 3, 2015. The concerts took place at the Big Hat arena in Nagano, the Yoyogi National Gymnasium in Tokyo, the Nippon Gaishi Hall in Aichi, the Sun Dome in Fukui, and the Osaka-jō Hall in Osaka.

== Commercial performance ==
Colors debuted atop the daily Oricon Albums Chart, selling 18,046 copies in its first day of release. It went on to debut at number one on the weekly chart, selling 31,000 copies in its first week. It is the first time the band topped the chart since Code Name Blue, released three years and one month prior. On the chart dated October 12, 2015, Colors debuted at number two on Billboard magazine's Japan Hot Albums.

== Track listing ==
All editions
No.	Title	Lyrics	Music	Length
1.	"Intro"		Jung Yong-hwa, Han Seung-hoon	1:24
2.	"Supernova"	Jung Yong-hwa, Takashi Ogawa	Jung Yong-hwa, Han Seung-hoon	3:29
3.	"White"	Lee Jong-hyun, Jung Yong-hwa, miwa	Lee Jong-hyun, Ryo, Go Jin-young	3:56
4.	"Holiday"	Jung Yong-hwa	Jung Yong-hwa	2:35
5.	"Holds My Hands"	Jung Yong-hwa	Jung Yong-hwa	3:56
6.	"Irony"	Lee Jong-hyun, Ryo	Lee Jong-hyun	3:51
7.	"Realize"	Jung Yong-hwa	Jung Yong-hwa	4:32
8.	"Daisy"	Lee Jung-shin	Jung Yong-hwa, Lee Jung-shin	4:43
9.	"Lucid Dream"	Lee Jong-hyun	Lee Jong-hyun, Han Seung-hoon, Kim Jae-yang	4:00
10.	"Hold Me"	Jung Yong-hwa	Jung Yong-hwa, Han Seung-hoon	3:32
11.	"My World"	Jung Yong-hwa	Jung Yong-hwa, Han Seung-hoon	4:27
Total length:				40:37

Limited Edition A — bonus DVD content
No.	Title	Length
1.	"Supernova" (music video)
2.	"Supernova" (special feature)
3.	"Supernova" (shooting of solo cut "Yong-hwa, Jong-hyun, Min-hyuk, Jung-shin")

Limited Edition B — bonus DVD content
No.	Title	Length
1.	"Ryu Can Do It", "In My Head", "Wake Up", "Coffee Shop", "I'm Sorry" (Live from Rock Nation 2014.8.15 [first half])

Boice Limited Edition — bonus DVD content
No.	Title	Length
1.	"Lady", "Can't Stop" (Live from Rock Nation 2014.8.15 [second half])
2.	"Digest from Boice Natsumatsuri 2015"

== Charts ==
Chart (2015)	Peak position
Billboard Japan Hot Albums	2
Oricon Albums Chart	1
