= Thank U (album) =

Studio album by CNBLUE
- Released: March 20, 2010
- Recorded: 2009–2010
- Genre: Rock
- Language: English; Japanese
- Label: AI Entertainment
- Producer: Choi Yoonjeong

CNBLUE chronology
Bluetory (2010)	Thank U (2010)	Bluelove (2010)

Thank U is the first studio album and Japanese release by the South Korean rock band CNBLUE. It was released on March 20, 2010 in Japan. The majority of the songs were sung in English, with the exception of "voice" and "a.ri.ga.tou." Several of the songs on this album were later released in Korean on the band's debut Korean album, First Step. This is the first of the two indie albums CNBlue released before signing with Warner Music Japan for their major Japanese debut on October 19, 2011. The album sold over 10,237 copies.

== Composition ==
Several songs were written by leader, lead vocalist, and rhythm guitarist Jung Yong-hwa and lead guitarist and vocalist Lee Jong-hyun. All of the tracks with the exception of "Intro" and "a.ri.ga.tou" were previously released on their EPs Now or Never and Voice. The Korean versions of "Just Please," "Wanna Be Like U," and "a.ri.ga.tou" were later included in the band's debut Korean album, First Step. "One of a kind" was also included as a bonus track. "a.ri.ga.tou" was changed to the name "Thank You" (고마워요; Gomawoyo).

== Track listing ==
Track list
No.	Title	Lyrics	Music	Arrangement	Length
1.	"Intro"	-	Jung Yong-hwa	OWL	1:27
2.	"Let's Go Crazy"	Shusui, Family Business	Shusui, Family Business	Yoshihiko Chino	4:01
3.	"Love Revolution"	Jung Yong-hwa	Han Seong-ho, Kim Jae-yang	OWL	3:19
4.	"Wanna Be like U"	Shusui, Tony Nilsson	Shusui, Tony Nilsson	OWL	3:47
5.	"Never too late"	CUL	Lee Jong-hyun, J.SOO	OWL	4:04
6.	"Now or Never"	Shusui, Family Business	Shusui, Family Business	Hirofumi Sasaki	3:43
7.	"voice"	Daichi	Daichi, Youwhich	Owl	4:09
8.	"Just Please"	Jung Yong-hwa	Jung Yong-hwa, OWL	OWL	3:19
9.	"Y, Why..."	Jung Yong-hwa	Jung Yong-hwa, RYO	OWL, Ryo-ta Fukuoka	3:54
10.	"Teardrops in the Rain"	Shusui, Thomas G'son	Shusui, Thomas G'son	Hirofumi Sasaki	4:40
11.	"One of a kind"	Shusui, Mattias Håkansson	Shusui, Mattias Håkansson	OWL, Ryo-ta Fukuoka	4:06
12.	"a.ri.ga.tou"	CUL	Lee Jong-hyun	OWL	5:22

== Personnel ==
Credits adapted from album liner notes.

- CNBLUE:
  - Jung Yong-hwa - vocals, guitar
  - Lee Jong-hyun - guitar, vocals
  - Lee Jung-shin - bass
  - Kang Min-hyuk - drums
- Instrumental Staff:
  - OWL - additional instruments
  - Yoshihiko Chino - all additional instruments and programming, additional guitars
  - Hirofumi Sasaki - all additional instruments and programming
  - Hiroyuki Teneda - additional guitars
- Choi Yoon-jeong - producing
- Shusui (Stock Room International) - sound producing and directing
- OWL - directing
- Ryo-ta Fukuoka - directing
- Han Seung-hoon - directing
- Naoki Ibaraki (Muku Studio) - recording
- Yutaka Yamamoto - recording
- Ken Mataucks - recording
- Kazuya Kikkai - recording
- Lee Yu-jin - recording and mixing
- Naoki Ibaraki - mixing
- Choi Hyo-young (Sonic Korea) - mastering
- Takshiro Uchida (Flair) - mastering
- Technical adviser:
  - Genpachi Sekiguchi - drums
  - Hiroyuki Taneda - guitar
  - Ryo-ta Fukuoka - guitar
  - Ryota Kanbayashi - bass
- Daiki - bass
- Sound Crew Studio - recording studio
- Muku Studio - recording studio
- CtoX Sound Studio - recording studio
- F&C Music Studio - recording studio
- Seoul Studio - recording studio
- Cho Dae-young - art direction & design
- Kim Jung-kyeum - photographer
- AI Entertainment Inc. - artist promotion
- Masahide Asso - artist manager
- Yumi Fukuda - label desk
- Ayumi Tsuji - label desk
- Choi Yoonjeong - executive producer

== Chart performance ==
Oricon Chart	Position
Weekly Albums Chart	90
