= My Love (Lee Jong-hyun song) =

Single by Lee Jong-hyun

from the album A Gentleman's Dignity OST 2
- Released: July 8, 2012
- Recorded: 2012
- Genre: Pop
- Length: 3:46
- Label: Hwa & Dam Pictures
- Songwriter: Lee Jong-hyun

Lee Jong-hyun singles chronology
"High Fly" (2010)	"My Love" (2012)	"Romantic J" (2013)

"My Love" (Korean: 내 사랑아; RR: Nae saranga) is a song by South Korean musician Lee Jong-hyun of CNBLUE. After being cast to play the role of Collin on Seoul Broadcasting System's (SBS) television series A Gentleman's Dignity, the song was released as the fifth installment of drama's original soundtrack on July 8, 2012, under Hwa & Dam Pictures and distributed by CJ E&M Music. A pop song accompanied with a steel-string acoustic guitar, the lyrics reflect the sentiments of Lee's character of "longing for a loved one".

"My Love" peaked at numbers two and four on the Billboard Korea K-Pop Hot 100 and Gaon Digital Chart, respectively. It ranked number six on the former's year-end chart, and number 15 on the latter. The song earned Lee five award nominations, ultimately winning Best OST at the 2013 Seoul Music Awards.

== Background and composition ==
In March 2012, Lee was cast for SBS's drama A Gentleman's Dignity, his debut acting role in a television series. Filming commenced the following month, where he played the character of Collin. It would begin airing in May, in midst of his band promotions with CNBLUE.

"My Love" is a pop song with a "gentle" melody coupled with a steel-string acoustic guitar, where Lee sings in a "sweet and soft voice". The lyrics are an "expression of longing for a loved one". The song was written by Lee, and composed and arranged by Kim Jae-yang; it is composed in the key of G minor using common time with a tempo of 115 beats per minute. When recording the track, Lee stated that it was sung from an empathetic perspective of his character.

== Release and promotion ==
On July 6, 2012, it was announced that Lee would release "My Love" on July 8 as the fifth installment of a series of songs released for the original soundtrack of A Gentleman's Dignity. The song was revealed when his character performed the song on the 13th episode of the drama. He first performed the song alongside CNBLUE at the National Theater of Korea during the 2012 Seoul International Drama Awards. Lee went on to perform the song at the 2012 SBS Drama Awards and the Seoul Music Awards in 2013.

== Commercial performance and accolades ==
On the chart dated July 8–14, 2012, "My Love" debuted at number four on the Gaon Digital Chart, selling 267,455 downloads and accumulating 1,072,842 streams in its first week. By the end of the month, the song ranked number five on the monthly Digital Chart, where it was the fifth best-selling song of the month with 830,673 digital downloads and 14th most streamed song with 5,308,444 streams. On the year-end chart, "My Love" ranked number 15 on Gaon's 2012 Comprehensive Digital Top 100. It became the 34th best-selling song in South Korea that year with 2,187,150 digital downloads and ranked at number 16 on the Streaming Chart for accumulating 24,645,766 streams.

On the chart dated July 21, 2012, "My Love" debuted at number ten on the Billboard Korea K-Pop Hot 100 chart. On its third week, the song reach its peak of number two behind Psy's "Gangnam Style". It descended from the chart the following week, but returned to its peak by its seventh week on the chart dated September 1. "My Love" went on to rank number six on the Korea K-Pop Hot 100 year-end chart.

"My Love" received award nominations for Best OST at the 5th Korea Drama Awards, 14th Mnet Asian Music Awards, and 4th Melon Music Awards, the lattermost of where it was also nominated for Tstore Best Song. The song ultimately earned Lee the award for Best OST at the 22nd Seoul Music Awards in 2013, a first for his solo work.

== Charts ==
=== Weekly ===
Chart (2012)	Peak position
Billboard Korea K-Pop Hot 100	2
Gaon Digital Chart	4
Gaon Mobile Chart	2
Gaon Noraebang Chart	2

=== Year-end ===
Chart (2012)	Peak position
Billboard Korea K-Pop Hot 100	6
Gaon Digital Chart	15
