= Bluetory =

EP by CNBLUE
- Released: January 14, 2010
- Venue: FNC Music Studio
- Genre: Pop rock; alternative rock
- Length: 19:17
- Language: Korean
- Label: FNC Music
- Producer: Han Seong-ho, Kim Jae-yang, Han Seung-hun

CNBLUE chronology
Voice (2009)	Bluetory (2010)	Thank U (2010)

Singles from Bluetory
- 1. "I'm a Loner" Released: January 14, 2010

Bluetory is the Korean debut mini-album by South Korean pop-rock idol band CNBLUE. It was released on January 14, 2010, under FNC Music and distributed by Mnet Media. After being signed to the record label, the quartet was sent to Japan, where it independently released two mini-albums. While working with the band, frontman Jung Yong-hwa was cast in the television drama You're Beautiful (2009), where he first garnered recognition.

Following a series of video teasers for each member, Bluetory and its lead single "I'm a Loner" were concurrently released. CNBLUE was met with immediate commercial success; the mini-album topped the Gaon Music Chart for two consecutive weeks, and "I'm a Loner" peaked at number two on the Gaon Digital Chart. The latter earned the quartet two music show wins, the first being on Music Bank two weeks into its debut.

== Background ==
After being scouted by FNC Music's casting director, Jung Yong-hwa, Lee Jong-hyun, and Kang Min-hyuk met while auditioning for the agency. The three kept in contact before being accepted by the record company. FNC Music decided to send CNBLUE to Japan "where the idea of a band is more recognized"; the band saw it as an opportunity to "improve on our skills". The quartet initially debuted there under AI Entertainment in 2009, where it released its first two independent mini-albums Now or Never and Voice. The band would perform on the streets and in small venues throughout the country. Unable to speak Japanese, the members learned the language "in order to survive out there". In late September, bassist Kwon Kwang-jin left the band due to "personal reasons" and was replaced by Lee Jung-shin later that year.

During this time period, Jung was cast in Seoul Broadcasting System's (SBS) television series You're Beautiful, where he played guitarist Kang Shin-woo in the fictional band A.N.Jell. The drama saw popularity in international markets, which fostered the growth of his popularity.

== Music structure ==
Musically, Bluetory is a pop-rock record. Jung described it as being an alternative rock mini-album, which also incorporated hip hop, rap, and balladry. Originally sung in English for the band's Japanese mini-albums, the tracks "Y, Why...", "Now or Never", and "I Will... Forget You..." were re-recorded in Korean for inclusion on Bluetory. "Y, Why..." encompasses a "refreshing" guitar, while the latter was classified as a modern rock song with an "explosive" guitar in the chorus. Frontman Jung identified the lattermost track as the first ballad in CNBLUE's catalog.

== Release and promotion ==
CNBLUE was dubbed "the second" F.T. Island since its inception. In early December 2009, Jung first revealed that CNBLUE was set to debut in South Korea "early" the following year. On January 5, 2010, CNBLUE's debut was announced to be on January 14. In addition to video teasers, each member was accompanied by a word that made up the acronym BLUE, which was meant to portray their individual images. The first 35-second teaser was released on January 7, which revealed Lee Jong-hyun and the word "burning". The following day, Kang Min-hyuk and the word "lovely" were revealed. The video teaser for Lee Jung-shin with the accompanying word "untouchable" was published on January 11. The fourth and final teaser featuring Jung with the word "emotional" was revealed one day prior to the release of the mini-album.

Bluetory and the lead single "I'm a Loner" were concurrently released on January 14. The band partook in an album showcase later that day at the Textile Center in the Samseong-dong area of Seoul. On the following day, CNBLUE began promoting "I'm a Loner" by performing the song on weekly music chart shows, beginning with Korean Broadcasting System's (KBS) Music Bank and SBS's Inkigayo. On the January 29 broadcast of Music Bank, CNBLUE ranked number one on program's music chart, earning the band its first music show win. CNBLUE won the Mutizen Song award on Inkigayo two days later, the band's second and final win. At the time, CNBLUE's initial win two weeks into its debut was unprecedented. It held the record for shortest amount of time to win a music show award after debut until Winner won its first music show on August 17, 2014, five days into its debut.

Performing only in Japan up to its debut, CNBLUE also sought to execute a series of guerrilla concerts in South Korea. The quartet decided to go in order of its acronym for the members' individual images (BLUE). The first performance was decided by guitarist Lee; dubbed the "Burning Street Concert", it took place in Hongdae, Seoul.

== Commercial performance ==
On the chart dated January 10–16, 2010, Bluetory debuted at number one on the Gaon Album Chart. It went on to top the chart for a second consecutive week. By the end of the year, the mini-album sold 77,183 copies and was ranked at the 12th best-selling album in South Korea. In the four years that followed, the record sold an additional 41,782 copies in the country, accumulating sales of 118,965 in total. (Note: Accumulation of Bluetory sales per year: 77,183 (2010), 24,889 (2011), 9,297 (2012), 5,365 (2013), 2,231 (2014).)

== Track listing ==
No.	Title	Lyrics	Music	Arrangement	Length
1.	"I'm a Loner" (외톨이야; Oetoriya)	Han Seong-ho, Amen	Kim Do-hoon, Lee Sang-ho	Kim Do-hoon, Lee Sang-ho	3:38
2.	"Love Revolution"	Jung Yong-hwa, Han Seong-ho	Han Seong-ho, Kim Jae-yang	Owl	3:17
3.	"Y, Why..."	Jung Yong-hwa, Han Seong-ho	Jung Yong-hwa, Ryo	Owl, Ryo-ta Fukuoka	3:48
4.	"Now or Never"	Shusui, Family Business	Shusui, Family Business	Hirofumi Sasaki	3:45
5.	"I Will... Forget You..." (그럴 겁니다... 잊을 겁니다...; Geureol Geomnida... Ijeul Geomnida)	Shusui, Thomas G'son	Shusui, Thomas G'son	Hirofumi Sasaki	4:49
Total length:					19:17

== Charts ==
=== Weekly ===
Chart (2010)	Peak position
Five Music J-pop / K-pop Chart	1
G-Music J-pop Chart	1
Gaon Album Chart	1

=== Year-end ===
Chart (2010)	Peak position
Gaon Album Chart	12

Chart (2011)	Peak position
Gaon Album Chart	66

Chart (2012)	Peak position
Gaon Album Chart	149

Chart (2013)	Peak position
Gaon Album Chart	204

Chart (2014)	Peak position
Gaon Album Chart	326

== Release history ==
List of release dates, showing region, edition, formats, label, and reference
Region	Date	Edition(s)	Format(s)	Label	Ref.
South Korea	January 14, 2010	Standard	CD, digital download	FNC; Mnet Media	
Taiwan	August 10, 2010	Version A	CD	Warner Music Taiwan	
Taiwan	August 10, 2010	Version B	CD	Warner Music Taiwan	

== See also ==
- List of Gaon Album Chart number ones of 2010
