= White (CNBLUE song) =

- Regular Edition cover

Single by CNBLUE

from the album Colors
- Released: April 8, 2015
- Recorded: 2014
- Genre: Electronic rock
- Length: 3:56
- Label: Warner Music Japan
- Songwriters: Lee Jong-hyun, Jung Yong-hwa, miwa

CNBLUE Japanese singles chronology
| "Radio" (2014) | "White" (2015) | "Supernova" (2015) |

"White" (stylized "WHITE") is a song by South Korean rock band CNBLUE. It was released on April 8, 2015, as their ninth single under Warner Music Japan and 12th single overall in Japan. The song was conceived by guitarist Lee Jong-hyun in midst of the CNBLUE 2014 Arena Tour "Wave" concerts. The song was written by band members Lee Jong-hyun and Jung Yong-hwa, in addition to miwa. Portraying a message of hope, "White" combines the band's rock style and infuses a synthesizer to create a sound distinctive from the band's previous work.

The single was released in four editions: Regular Edition, Limited Editions A and B, and a fan club-only Boice Limited Edition. "White" debuted on the weekly Oricon Singles Chart at number four and has sold over 28,000 copies since its release. The band embarked on the CNBLUE Spring Live 2015 "White" arena tour, where they held three concerts in Osaka and Kanagawa. The final show of the tour was recorded, spawning a live DVD and Blu-ray release in August 2015. "White" was included on the band's sixth Japanese studio album Colors.

== Background ==
After the release of CNBLUE's fifth Japanese studio album Wave in September 2014, band member Lee Jong-hyun began forming ideas of releasing a single that slightly deviated from the band's music. He consulted his bandmates regarding the notion, but he "didn't think very seriously about it". He felt that it was a natural progression as a musician. He began working on the song during the CNBLUE 2014 Arena Tour "Wave" concerts and continued to work on the song during the 2014 FNC Kingdom in Japan: Starlight concerts, among various other opportunities. In creating the composition, he wanted to avoid making more sad songs and set out to make a "fun" song for live performances. He first began by playing a full phrase on a guitar before implementing different arrangements on a computer. "White" was announced as CNBLUE's ninth single on March 7, 2015, with a release date of April 8.

== Composition ==
"White" was written by band members Lee Jong-hyun and Jung Yong-hwa, with additional songwriting by miwa. The song was composed by Lee Jong-hyun, Ryo, and Go Jin-young, and arranged by Tomozaku Miura and Jun "Silky Voice" Inoue. It is an uptempo electronic rock song that incorporates a synthesizer; the lyrics deliver a "positive message about leading one's life, like trying to fill a blank map". In an interview with Excite Japan, Lee Jong-hyun articulated, "Light has three primary colors, but doesn't light become white by combining different colors? However, by combining various colors, it becomes black, too. So, keeping that in mind, isn't everyone turning dark when overthinking lately? So, 'let's be the light!', that is the theme." "White" steers from the band's typical musical style. Bassist Lee Jung-shin sensed an "exceptional transformation", noting a change in ambiance from Lee Jong-hyun's previous work. Drummer Kang Min-hyuk said that he was "surprised" that Lee Jong-hyun "challenged new things". Both members cited Lee Jong-hyun's history of writing ballads as source of their astonishment for the new sound. Vocalist Jung Yong-hwa observed the change as well, finding that the repetitious synthesizer was "quite appealing". Lee Jong-hyun expressed that he did not intend to surprise his listeners with the song, but described that the feeling came naturally afterward.

The single was accompanied by two coupling tracks. "Stay Sober" was written by Jung Yong-hwa, who also composed the song alongside Hong In-ho. It was arranged by Park Hyun-woo and Kim Jae-yang, with an additional guitar and bass provided by Lee Tae-wook and Go Jin-young, respectively. "Irony" was written by Lee Jong-hyun and Ryo, with the music being composed by the former. It was arranged by Park Hyun-woo and Ryo, with additional guitar and bass provided by Jung Jae-pil and Go Jin-young, respectively.

== Release and promotion ==
A 30-second preview of the music video for "White" was uploaded on Warner Music Japan's YouTube channel on March 13, 2015. The full music video was uploaded on March 20. It is set in a cafe that exudes an "exotic atmosphere". The band is joined by an unidentified elderly man who plays a character referred to as White Man. The quintet make up Team White and they perform together throughout the video.

"White" was released on April 8, 2015, in four editions: Regular Edition; Limited Edition A with bonus DVD content that includes multi-angle performance footage of "Ring", "Go Your Way", and "Lonely Night" from the CNBLUE 2014 Arena Tour "Wave" concert that took place at the Osaka-jō Hall, the music video for the single, and a special feature; Limited Edition B with bonus DVD content that includes performance footage of "Ryu Can Do It", "In My Head", "Wake Up", and "Coffee Shop" from the first half of the band's set at the 2014 Summer Sonic Festival; and Boice Limited Edition with bonus DVD content that includes performance footage of "I'm Sorry", "Lady", and "Can't Stop" from the second half of the band's set at the 2014 Summer Sonic Festival.

CNBLUE was a guest on Tokyo Broadcasting System Television's (TBS) variety show Ōsama no Brunch (王様のブランチ」に; King's Brunch) on the April 11 broadcast in order to promote "White". The band embarked on the CNBLUE Spring Live 2015 "White" arena tour concerts on April 22 in Osaka at the Osaka-jō Hall and from April 24–25 in Kanagawa at the Yokohama Arena. The final show of the tour was recorded and aired on TBS on June 14. On July 10, Warner Music Japan published a video digest of the Spring Live 2015 "White" @Yokohama Arena DVD and Blu-ray. It was released on August 5.

== Chart performance ==
"White" sold 19,859 copies in its first day of release and ranked number two on the daily Oricon Singles Chart. On the issue dated April 20, 2015, the single debuted at number four on the weekly Oricon Singles Chart, selling 25,999 copies in its first week. On the same issue date, the song debuted at number five on the Billboard Japan Hot 100. On the monthly Oricon Singles Chart dated between April 6 through May 3, the single sold 28,871 copies. The single remained on the Oricon chart for five weeks.

On the issue dated August 17, 2015, CNBLUE's Spring Live 2015 "White" @Yokohama Arena video release debuted at number three on the weekly Oricon DVD Chart and at number 13 on the Oricon Blu-ray Chart.

== Track listing ==
Regular and Boice Limited Editions
| No. | Title | Lyrics | Music | Length |
|---|---|---|---|---|
| 1. | "White" | Lee Jong-hyun, Jung Yong-hwa, miwa | Lee Jong-hyun, Ryo, Go Jin-young | 3:56 |
| 2. | "Stay Sober" | Jung Yong-hwa | Jung Yong-hwa, Hong In-ho | 3:54 |
| 3. | "Irony" | Lee Jong-hyun, Ryo | Lee Jong-hyun | 3:51 |
| 4. | "White" (Instrumental) | | Lee Jong-hyun | 3:53 |
| Total length: | | | | 15:34 |

Limited Edition A
| No. | Title | Lyrics | Music | Length |
|---|---|---|---|---|
| 1. | "White" | Lee Jong-hyun, Jung Yong-hwa, miwa | Lee Jong-hyun, Ryo, Go Jin-young | 3:56 |
| 2. | "Stay Sober" | Jung Yong-hwa | Jung Yong-hwa, Hong In-ho | 3:54 |
| 3. | "Irony" | Lee Jong-hyun, Ryo | Lee Jong-hyun | 3:51 |
| 4. | "Stay Sober" (Instrumental) | | Jung Yong-hwa, Hong In-ho | 3:54 |
| Total length: | | | | 15:35 |

Limited Edition A — bonus DVD content
| No. | Title | Length |
|---|---|---|
| 1. | "Ring", "Go Your Way", "Lonely Night" (CNBLUE 2014 Arena Tour "Wave" @Osaka-jō Hall Multi Angle) |
| 2. | "White" (music video and special feature) |

Limited Edition B
| No. | Title | Lyrics | Music | Length |
|---|---|---|---|---|
| 1. | "White" | Lee Jong-hyun, Jung Yong-hwa, miwa | Lee Jong-hyun, Ryo, Go Jin-young | 3:56 |
| 2. | "Stay Sober" | Jung Yong-hwa | Jung Yong-hwa, Hong In-ho | 3:54 |
| 3. | "Irony" | Lee Jong-hyun, Ryo | Lee Jong-hyun | 3:51 |
| 4. | "Irony" (Instrumental) | | Lee Jong-hyun | 3:51 |
| Total length: | | | | 15:32 |

Limited Edition B — bonus DVD content
| No. | Title | Length |
|---|---|---|
| 1. | "Ryu Can Do It", "In My Head", "Wake Up", "Coffee Shop" (Live from Summer Sonic 2014 [first half]) |

Boice Limited Edition — bonus DVD content
| No. | Title | Length |
|---|---|---|
| 1. | "I'm Sorry", "Lady", "Can't Stop" (Live from Summer Sonic 2014 [second half], special feature) |

== Charts ==
| Chart (2015) | Peak position |
|---|---|
| Billboard Japan Hot 100 | 5 |
| Oricon Singles Chart | 4 |
