= 392 (album) =

Studio album by CN Blue
- Released: July 18, 2011
- Recorded: 2010–2011
- Genre: Rock
- Length: 43:14
- Language: Japanese / English
- Label: AI Entertainment

CN Blue chronology
First Step +1 Thank You (2011)	392 (2011)	Ear Fun (2012)

Singles from 392
- 1. "The Way" Released: June 23, 2010; 2. "I Don't Know Why" Released: August 26, 2010; 3. "Re-Maintenance" Released: January 9, 2011

392 is the second studio album and Japanese release by the South Korean rock band CNBlue. The album is the last indie release of the band in Japan, before the group move to Warner Music Japan. The album was released on September 1, 2011.

== Composition ==
The album includes all songs released in the singles and 3 new songs: "Man in Front of the Mirror", "Coward" and "Illusion".

== Singles ==
The album has 3 singles. The first single of the album is "The Way". The single ranked number 26 on Oricon's Weekly chart with 3,353 copies sold in first week and sold more than 9,000 copies since then.

The second single is "I Don't Know Why". The single ranked number 15 on Oricon's Weekly chart with 8,134 copies sold in first week and sold more than 14,000 copies until now .

The third and last single (which is also their last indie single) is "Re-Maintenance". The single ranked number 14 on Oricon's Weekly chart with 3,897 copies sold in first week then climbed to number 12 in second week with 5,296 copies sold and since then has sold more than 16,000 copies .

== Track listing ==
Track list
No.	Title	Lyrics	Music	Arrangement	Length
1.	"The Way" (part 2 ~Ready N Go~)	Jung Yong-hwa	Han Seong-ho, J. Soo	J. Soo	3:25
2.	"The Way" (part 1 ~One Time~)	Jung Yong-hwa	Jung Yong-hwa, Ryo	Ryo	3:48
3.	"Man in Front of the Mirror"	Jung Yong-hwa	Jung Yong-hwa, Ryo	youwhich	3:41
4.	"Try Again, Smile Again"	Jung Yong-hwa	Jung Yong-hwa, Ryo, Han Seong-ho	youwhich	3:56
5.	"Lie"	CUL	Lee Jong-hyun, Kim Jae-yang	Kim Jae-yang	3:49
6.	"The Way" (part 3 ~Eclipse~)	CUL	Lee Jong-hyun, Ryo	Ryo	5:00
7.	"Illusion"	Lee Jong-hyun, CUL	Lee Jong-hyun	youwhich	4:23
8.	"Don't Say Goodbye"	Jung Yong-hwa	Jung Yong-hwa, Ryo	youwhich	4:26
9.	"I Don't Know Why"	Jung Yong-hwa	Jung Yong-hwa, Ryo	Jung Yong-hwa, Ryo	3:44
10.	"Coward"	CUL	Lee Jong-hyun, Kim Jae-yang	Lee Jong-hyun, Kim Jae-yang	3:30
11.	"Kimio"	CUL	Lee Jong-hyun	youwhich	3:35
Total length:					43:14

== Personnel ==
Credits adapted from the liner notes of 392.

CNBLUE

- Jung Yong-hwa – vocals, harmony vocals, guitar, piano
- Lee Jong-hyun – vocals, harmony vocals, guitar
- Lee Jung-shin – bass guitar, harmony vocals
- Kang Min-hyuk – drums, harmony vocals

Production

- Choi Yoon-jung – producer
- Chinone Yuji – mastering

== Charts ==
=== Oricon ===
Oricon Chart	Peak	Debut sales	Sales total
Daily Albums Chart	3	6,658	26,000+
Weekly Albums Chart	6	14,654	26,000+
Weekly Indie Albums Chart	1	14,654	26,000+
Monthly Albums Chart	16	22,341	26,000+

=== Year-end charts ===
Chart (2011)	Position
Oricon Yearly Indie Album Chart	7
