= Sparkling Night =

- Regular Edition cover

Studio album by Lee Jong-hyun
- Released: July 27, 2016
- Recorded: 2014–2016
- Length: 38:21
- Language: Japanese
- Label: Warner Music Japan

Lee Jong-hyun chronology
Sparkling Night (2016)	Metropolis (2018)

Singles from Sparkling Night
- 1. "Moonlight Swing" Released: July 13, 2016

Sparkling Night (stylized SPARKLING NIGHT) is the debut Japanese-language solo studio album by South Korean guitarist and CNBLUE member Lee Jong-hyun. It was released on July 27, 2016, under Warner Music Japan.

== Background and development ==
Two years prior to the release of the album, Lee composed a blues song; his bandmates encouraged him to utilize the song for his solo album. In expressing his desire to release music independent from CNBLUE, Lee expected to collaborate with a different band instead of releasing a solo album. He worked with several composers in order to include a multitude of sounds which deviated from CNBLUE's music. Lee asked bandmate Jung Yong-hwa to compose a song for the album, which did not come to fruition due to Jung's filming schedule.

The lead single for Sparklight Night was determined by the record label via voting between two songs; "Moonlight Swing" was ultimately selected.

== Music structure ==
Dealing with eternal love, "Moonlight Swing" is a swing music song which incorporates elements of big band and emits a "fairy tale-like" atmosphere. Initially a song about remaining "pure and honest like Peter Pan", Lee made the decision to change "Moonlight Swing" into a love song in order to create a more relatable track.

== Release and promotion ==
Sparkling Night was announced as Lee's debut Japanese-language studio album on June 8, 2016, with a release date of July 27. Upon the announcement of the album, a "special" website was introduced where further information would be revealed. A 20-second preview of the music video for "Moonlight Swing" was uploaded on Lee's Instagram account on June 17, 2016; the full music video was uploaded on Warner Music Japan's YouTube channel three days later. On June 22, the record label also uploaded an album digest. A teaser for the lyric video for "Smile" was published on July 11 prior to its full release three days later. "Moonlight Swing" was made available at digital retailers on July 13.

Sparkling Night was released on July 27 in three editions: Regular Edition; Limited Edition with bonus DVD content that includes the music video and making of "Moonlight Swing"; and Boice Limited Edition that includes a set of Lee and guitar pin badges.

Lee embarked on the 1st Solo Concert in Japan "Welcome to Sparkling Night" tour, his first series of solo concerts. The first two concerts took place from August 9–10 at the Osaka International Convention Center in Osaka, followed by a concert on August 13 at the Nagoya Congress Center in Aichi, and two final concerts from August 17–18 at the Tokyo International Forum in Tokyo.

== Commercial performance ==
On the chart dated August 8, 2016, Sparkling Night debuted at number seven on the weekly Oricon Albums Chart, selling 12,583 copies in its first week. On the same issue date, it debuted at number nine on Billboard Japan magazine's Hot Albums. It has sold 13,529 copies in the country since its release.

== Track listing ==
Track listing
No.	Title	Lyrics	Music	Length
1.	"Shine Drop"	Lee Jong-hyun, Lilla	Magnus Funemyr	3:38
2.	"Pina Colada"	Lee Jong-hyun, Hasegawa	Alexander Holmgren, Andreas Stone Johansson, Jeff Franzel	3:39
3.	"Moonlight Swing"	Lee Jong-hyun, miwa	Josef Melin, Christofer Erixon	4:22
4.	"Smile"	Lee Jong-hyun, Hajime Watanabe	Warren Meyers, Mike Peters, Jenna Donnelly, Jamie Sellers, Airto Edmundo Nicolaas	3:51
5.	"I Just Need a..."	Lee Jong-hyun	Lee Jong-hyun	3:56
6.	"I Love You"	Yutaka Ozaki	Yutaka Ozaki	5:28
7.	"Nothing"	Lee Jong-hyun	Lee Jong-hyun	3:36
8.	"Hate You"	Lee Jong-hyun	Lee Jong-hyun	3:03
9.	"Call Me"	Lee Jong-hyun, Hasegawa	Steven Lee, Andreas Carlsson, Fredrik Hult, Andreas Öberg	3:08
10.	"Show Me More"	Lee Jong-hyun	Lee Jong-hyun	3:40
Total length:				38:21

Limited Edition – bonus DVD content
No.	Title	Length
1.	"Moonlight Swing" (music video)
2.	"Moonlight Swing" (making movie)

== Charts ==
Chart (2016)	Peak position
Billboard Japan Hot Albums	9
Oricon Albums Chart	7
