= Where You Are (CNBLUE song) =

- Regular edition cover

Single by CN Blue

from the album Code Name Blue
- B-side: "Get Away"; "Feeling"
- Released: February 1, 2012
- Recorded: 2011
- Genre: Rock
- Length: 3:46
- Label: Warner Music Japan
- Songwriters: Jung Yong-hwa, Kenji Tamai

CN Blue Japanese singles chronology
"In My Head" (2011)	"Where You Are" (2012)	"Come On" (2012)

"Where You Are" is a song by the South Korean rock band CN Blue, written by Jung Yong-hwa and Kenji Tamai. It is the second major single by the band in Japan under Warner Music Japan and their fifth overall. It was released on February 1, 2012 in 3 different editions: CD+DVD, Regular edition and Lawson store limited edition.

== Composition ==
"Where You Are" was composed and written by Jung Yong-hwa and Kenji Tamai. The B-side, "Get Away" was written by Nozomi Maezawa and Agehasprings and composed by Lee Jong-hyun and Ryo. The second B-side, "Feeling" was written and composed by Jung Yong-hwa and Ryo.

== Promotions ==
To promote the single, the band performed the song on the music TV shows Music Japan on January 29 and on Hey! Hey! Hey! Music Champ on January 30. B-side of the Single "Get Away" was chosen as ending theme song for Japanese broadcast of American TV Series Gossip Girl Season 3 started from May 1.

== Music video ==
A TV advertisement for the single was released on December 27, 2011. The full music video was released on January 8, 2012 on the music TV network Space Shower TV. In the music video, the members are playing the song in front of various mirrors. Warner Music Japan uploaded the music video to YouTube on January 29.

== Track listing ==
All editions:
No.	Title	Lyrics	Music	Arrangement	Length
1.	"Where You Are"	Jung Yong-hwa, Kenji Tamai	Jung Yong-hwa	Kenji Tamai, Rui Momota	3:46
2.	"Get Away"	Nozomi Maezawa & Agehasprings	Lee Jong-hyun, Ryo	Kenji Tamai, Tsunsuke Tsuri	3:33
3.	"Feeling"	Jung Yong-hwa	Jung Yong-hwa, Ryo	Kenji Tamai, Rui Momota	3:34
4.	"Where You Are" (Instrumental)		Jung Yong-hwa	Kenji Tamai, Rui Momota	3:44
Total length:					14:35

DVD
No.	Title	Length
1.	"Release Live Event Footage" (リリースイベントライブ映像)
2.	"Where You Are" (Music video)
3.	"Where You Are" (Music video - Behind the scenes)

== Chart performance ==
The physical single debuted at number one in Oricon's Daily chart with 32,943 copies sold on the first day and on the Weekly chart with 60,398 copies sold in the first week. The single is the first #1 single of the group on the country and first for a foreign band since 1971, when the Canadian band Mashmakhan released the single "Two in the Fog". The band is the fourth South Korean male artist/group to rank number 1 in Oricon's Weekly singles chart, along with Tohoshinki, JYJ members Jaejoong & Yoochun and Jang Keun-suk.

=== Charts ===
==== Oricon ====
Released	Oricon Chart	Peak	Debut sales	Sales total
February 1, 2012	Daily Singles Chart	1	32,943 (Daily); 60,398 (Weekly)	71,417+
February 1, 2012	Weekly Singles Chart	1	32,943 (Daily); 60,398 (Weekly)	71,417+
February 1, 2012	Monthly Singles Chart	8	32,943 (Daily); 60,398 (Weekly)	71,417+
February 1, 2012	Half-Year Singles Chart	50	32,943 (Daily); 60,398 (Weekly)	71,417+

==== Other charts ====
Chart	Peak position
Billboard Japan Hot 100	2
Billboard Japan Hot Singles sales	1
Billboard Japan Hot Top Airplay	18
RIAJ Digital Track Chart weekly top 100	44

== Release history ==
Country	Date	Format	Label
Japan	February 1, 2012	CD single, Digital download	Warner Music Japan
