= Acoustic (film) =

- Directed by: Yoo Sang-hun
- Produced by: Park Young-joon; Kim Myung-eun; Song Chan-ho
- Starring: Shin Se-kyung; Baek Jin-hee; Im Seulong; Lee Jong-hyun; Kang Min-hyuk
- Cinematography: Song Ho-yeon
- Edited by: Lee Dong-hun
- Music by: Marco
- Distributed by: M-Line Distribution
- Release date: October 28, 2010 (South Korea)
- Running time: 88 minutes
- Country: South Korea
- Language: Korean
- Box office: US$50,766

Acoustic (Korean: 어쿠스틱) is a 2010 South Korean omnibus film depicting stories of love, hope, and music among twenty-somethings - all set within the Hongdae area of Seoul.

== Synopsis ==
Episode 1 "Broccoli"
Se-kyung, a singer-songwriter who is suffering from a rare disease, can only survive on instant cup ramen noodles. Rejected by record executives for her "mushy" music and told only her looks sell, she runs out of the hospital in order to make known what could be her last song.

Episode 2 "Bakery Attack"
Vocalist Seong-won and drummer Hae-won decide to sell their beloved guitar out of hungry desperation. Thanks to Hae-won's forgetfulness and mysterious thinking process, he leaves it at a bakery store, whose owner happens to be an amateur musician. He thus proceeds to preach to the two about what it really means to love music, and they seem to be inspired to pursue their dreams no matter how difficult it is. (Based on the short story "The Second Bakery Attack" by Haruki Murakami, from his first short story collection The Elephant Vanishes.)

Episode 3 "Unlock"
Set in the distant future, a world where music has ceased to exist and sound is used as a weapon, Ji-hoo falls for Jin-hee, an uncanny girl with a prosthetic arm. The two embark on a mission to access an iPhone, which has become a treasured relic and stores a precious song from the girl's childhood.

== Cast ==
=== Broccoli ===
- Shin Se-kyung as Se-kyung
- Im Joon-il as Ji-gyu
- Lee Dong-hyun as Dong-hyun
- Lee Jong-hoon as bar owner
- Lee Jin-woo as boy
- Lee Ji-ah as girl

=== Bakery Attack ===
- Lee Jong-hyun as Kim Seong-won
- Kang Min-hyuk as Kim Hae-won
- Choi Deok-moon as bakery owner
- Yoon Ji-yeong as part-time worker
- Kim Jeong-kwon as guitar guy
- Go Yoo-mi as female customer

=== Unlock ===
- Baek Jin-hee as Jin-hee
- Im Seulong as Ji-hoo
- Kim Jeong-seok as Professor Noh
- Lee Jeong-heon as black marker weapon dealer
- Won Woong-jae as pub owner
- Yoon Jong-hyeok as Ji-hoo's junior colleague
- Son Sang-hyeon as follower 1
- Lee Tae-yeon as follower 2
- Oh Hyeong-jin as liberal arts professor
- Kim Seon-ah as Jin-hee's mom
- Lee Eun-joo as nurse
- Jo Eun-seo as young Jin-hee
