= First Step (CNBLUE album) =

2011 studio album by CNBLUE

Studio album by CNBLUE
- Released: March 21, 2011
- Recorded: 2010–2011
- Genre: Rock
- Length: 47:30
- Language: Korean
- Labels: FNC Entertainment, Mnet Media

CNBLUE chronology
Bluelove (2010)	First Step (2011)	First Step +1 Thank You (2011)

Alternative Cover
- Special Limited Edition cover

Singles from First Step
- 1. "Intuition" Released: March 21, 2011; 2. "Love Girl" Released: April 26, 2011

First Step is the debut studio album by the South Korean rock band CNBLUE. The album was released on March 21, 2011 in South Korea. The song "Intuition" was used as the title track. The album contains twelve songs, three new songs, eight Korean versions of their Japanese songs and one song from their Japanese album as bonus track. The album was re-released on April 7, 2011 in a Special Limited Edition with the same track list and an 80-pages photobook with making-of the music videos "Intuition" and "Love Girl".

== Composition ==
The album contains Korean versions of songs which were previously released in Japanese. The songs "I Don't Know Why", "Lie", "One Time" and "Ready N Go" (previously titled "The Way part 1 ~One Time~" and "The Way part 2 ~Ready N Go~") from their second Japanese album 392, "Just Please" from their Japanese debut EP Now or Never, "Wanna Be Like U" and "One of a Kind" from their second Japanese EP Voice, and the song "Thank You" (previously titled "a.ri.ga.tou.") from their first Japanese album ThankU.

== Music videos ==
=== "Intuition" ===
The first teaser of the music video for "Intuition" was released on March 6, 2011 on the CNBLUE's YouTube account. The second teaser was released a week after. The full music video was released on March 21, 2011, along with the album.

=== "Love Girl" ===
A teaser for the music video of "Love Girl" was released on April 21, 2011 and the full music video on April 25 on the CN Blue's YouTube account.

== Promotion ==
The promotion of the title track "Intuition" started on March 24, on Mnet's show M! Countdown and was also promoted in the TV shows Music Bank, Music Core and Inkigayo. The songs "Love Follows the Rain", "Love Girl", "I Don't Know Why" and "Imagine" were used for the special comeback week performances. The song won 7 music show awards: 3 on M! Countdown, 3 on Music Bank and 1 on Inkigayo. To celebrate the "triple crown" on M! Countdown, the group made a special stage performance with the songs "Love Girl" and "Lie". The promotions of the song ended on April 24, on Inkigayo. They followed the promotions with the song "Love Girl" to promote the special EP First Step +1 Thank You, the first performance of the song was on April 29 on Music Bank. The promotions of the song and albums ended on May 22. The song "Intuition" placed at No.19 on KBS Music Bank Year End 2011 K-Chart.

== Track listing ==
First Step
No.	Title	Lyrics	Music	Arrangement	Length
1.	"Intuition" (직감; Jikgam)	Han Seong-ho	SEI, KOZI	SEI, KOZI	3:42
2.	"Love Girl"	Jung Yong-hwa, Han Seong-ho	Jung Yong-hwa, Han Seung-hun	Jung Yong-hwa, Han Seung-hun	3:33
3.	"Imagine" (상상; Sangsang)	Han Seong-ho, Jung Yong-hwa	Kim Jae-yang, Han Seung-hun	Kim Jae-yang	3:59
4.	"I Don't Know Why" (Korean version)	Jung Yong-hwa, Han Seong-ho	Jung Yong-hwa, Han Seung-hun	Jung Yong-hwa, Han Seung-hun	3:48
5.	"Love Follows the Rain" (사랑은 비를 타고; Sarangeun Bireul Tago)	Han Seong-ho	Lee Jong-hyun, Han Seung-hun	Han Seung-hun	5:03
6.	"Lie" (Korean version)	Kim Jae-yang	Lee Jong-hyun, Kim Jae-yang	Kim Jae-yang	3:49
7.	"One Time" (Korean version)	Jung Yong-hwa	Jung Yong-hwa, Han Seung-hun	Jung Yong-hwa, Han Seung-hun	3:49
8.	"Just Please" (Korean version)	Jung Yong-hwa	Jung Yong-hwa, OWL	OWL	3:20
9.	"Wanna Be Like U" (Korean version)	CNBLUE	Shusui, Tony Nilsson	OWL	3:40
10.	"Ready N Go" (Korean version)	Han Seong-ho, Jung Yong-hwa	Han Seong-ho	Jang Young-soo	3:28
11.	"Thank You" (고마워요; Gomawoyo)	CNBLUE	Lee Jong-hyun	OWL	5:27
12.	"One of a Kind" (Bonus track)	Shusui, Mattias Håkansson	Shusui, Mattias Håkansson	OWL, Ryo-ta Fukuoka	4:01
Total length:					47:30

== Chart performance ==
Chart	Peak position
Gaon Weekly album chart	1
Gaon Weekly domestic album chart	1
Gaon Weekly single chart ("Intuition")	1
Gaon Monthly album chart	2
Gaon Monthly single chart ("Intuition")	4
Gaon Yearly 2011 album chart	8
Gaon Yearly 2011 Top200 digital comprehensive chart ("Intuition")	12
Gaon Yearly 2011 Top200 download chart ("Intuition")	40
Gaon Yearly 2011 Top200 streaming chart ("Intuition")	16

=== Sales ===
Chart	Amount
2011 Gaon physical sales	115,467
2012 Gaon physical sales	19,265
Total Sales (copies)	134,732

== First Step +1 Thank You ==
First Step +1 Thank You

EP by CNBLUE
- Released: April 26, 2011
- Recorded: 2011
- Genre: Rock
- Length: 15:30
- Language: Korean
- Labels: FNC Entertainment, Mnet Media

CNBLUE chronology
First Step (2011)	First Step +1 Thank You (2011)	392 (2011)

"First Step +1 Thank You" is a special Korean EP released by the South Korean rock band CNBLUE. It is the third Korean EP of the group, but it's being counted as First Step's re-release album (repackage album). It was released on April 26, 2011 with the new version of the song "Love Girl" as the title track. The EP was released as a "thank you" gift for the fans who supported the group with their first studio album First Step. It comes with 4 songs, 3 Korean versions of their previous Japanese songs and a new arrangement version of the song "Love Girl" from their first studio album First Step.

=== Composition ===
This EP contains Korean versions of songs which were previously released in Japanese. Excluding "Love Girl", all the songs were previously released on their third Japanese indie single "Re-maintenance".

=== Track listing ===
First Step +1 Thank You
No.	Title	Lyrics	Music	Arrangement	Length
1.	"Love Girl" (New version)	Jung Yong-hwa, Han Seong-ho	Jung Yong-hwa, Han Seung-hun	Han Seung-hun, Shin Min-kyu	3:32
2.	"Try Again, Smile Again" (Korean version)	Jung Yong-hwa, Han Seong-ho	Jung Yong-hwa, Han Seung-hun, Han Seong-ho	youwhich	3:58
3.	"Don't Say Goodbye" (Korean version)	Han Seong-ho	Jung Yong-hwa, Han Seung-hun	youwhich	4:26
4.	"Yes" (그래요; Geuraeyo)	Lee Jong-hyun, Han Seong-ho	Lee Jong-hyun	youwhich	3:37
Total length:					15:30

=== Chart performance ===
Chart	Peak position
Gaon Weekly album chart	1
Gaon Weekly domestic album chart	1
Gaon Weekly single chart ("Love Girl" (New Ver.))	19
Gaon Monthly album chart	4
Gaon Monthly single chart ("Love Girl" (New Ver.))	52
Gaon Yearly 2011 album chart	48

==== Sales and certifications ====
Chart	Amount
Gaon physical sales	31,447 (2011 only)

== Release history ==
Country	Date	Format	Label
South Korea	March 21, 2011	CD, Digital download	FNC Entertainment
South Korea	April 7, 2011 (Special Limited edition)	CD	FNC Entertainment
South Korea	April 26, 2011 (First Step +1 Thank You)	CD, Digital download	FNC Entertainment
Taiwan	April 27, 2011	CD	Warner Music Taiwan
Taiwan	June 2, 2011 (First Step +1 Thank You)	CD	Warner Music Taiwan
