= CNBLUE =

South Korean rock band

- CNBLUE in 2026; L-R: Lee Jung-shin, Jung Yong-hwa, Kang Min-hyuk

Background information
- Origin: Seoul, South Korea
- Genres: Rock; pop; electronic
- Years active: 2009–present
- Labels: FNC; AI; Warner Japan
- Members: Jung Yong-hwa; Kang Min-hyuk; Lee Jung-shin
- Past members: Lee Jong-hyun; Kwon Kwang-jin
- Website: fncent.com/cnblue/

CNBLUE (Korean: 씨엔블루) is a South Korean pop rock band formed in 2009. The band consists of Jung Yong-hwa (leader, main vocals, guitar, keyboard, rap), Kang Min-hyuk (drums), and Lee Jung-shin (bass). First bassist Kwon Kwang-jin left the band after they released their debut Japanese extended play Now or Never in 2009, and was replaced by Lee Jung-shin. Lee Jong-hyun (guitar and vocals) left the band on August 28, 2019.

CN are initials for Code Name, while BLUE is a backronym for burning, lovely, untouchable, and emotional. It is meant to portray the images of Lee Jong-hyun as Burning, drums Kang Min-hyuk as Lovely, bass Lee Jung-shin as Untouchable, and Jung Yong Hwa's guitar and vocals and rapping, as Emotional. On January 14, 2010, CNBLUE debuted in Korea with the lead single "I'm a Loner" from their first Korean EP Bluetory.

== History ==
=== 2009: Debut in Japan ===
CNBLUE's first live performance took place in Tokyo, Japan, at the entrance of Shinjuku Station in early 2009; it was one of at least 20 other bands performing in the area. By mid-June 2009, the band began to perform on the streets and in live clubs. They formally debuted on August 19, 2009 with Now or Never. The EP was recorded completely in English, and failed to chart on the Oricon Albums Chart. In late September, their original bassist Kwon Kwang-jin left the band and was replaced by Lee Jung-shin later that year. Their second extended play Voice was released in November. Recorded with both English and Japanese tracks, Voice peaked at number 227 and charted for two weeks. Guitarist Lee described the band's independence in the country as "tough, but equally rewarding".

=== 2010: Successful debut in Korea ===
In January, FNC Entertainment unveiled a series of video teasers for CNBLUE's debut in South Korea. Bluetory was released on January 14, 2010, and stayed at the top of the Gaon Album Chart for two weeks. "I'm a Loner" was promoted as the lead single, and peaked at number two on the Gaon Digital Chart. The band had their first televised live performance on KBS' Music Bank on January 15. The song was an immediate commercial success and the band had their first music show chart win on Music Bank on January 29 and SBS' Inkigayo on January 31. CNBLUE held the record for achieving number one on South Korea's music programs in the shortest time since debut, grabbing their first win only 15 days after debuting with "I'm a Loner". The band had their debut reality show CNBLUEtory, broadcast on Mnet beginning March 10.

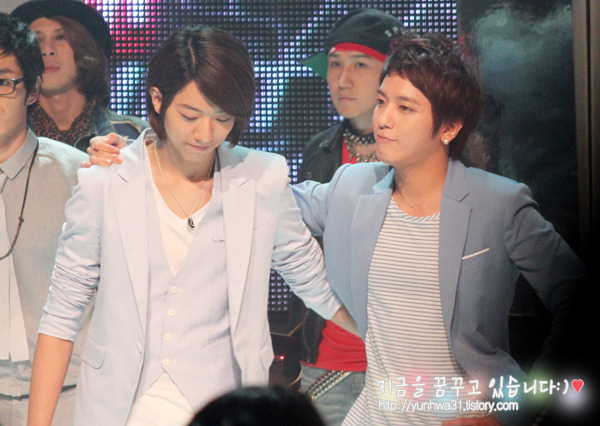
Bassist Lee and frontman Jung in midst of filming M Countdown, 2010

In March, the band started preparations for their first full-length independent album Thank U in Japan. It was released on March 20 with several tracks co-written and co-composed by Jung Yong-hwa. The album peaked at number 90 on the Oricon Weekly Album Charts.

CNBLUE headed back to Korea and released their next single, "Love Light" on May 10, in precedence of their next album. On May 19, their second extended play Bluelove was released and peaked at number three on the Gaon Album Chart. CNBLUE held their comeback performance on Mnet's M! Countdown the following day. It was promoted with the track "Love", which peaked at number two on Gaon, matching the success the band found earlier with "I'm a Loner". The band eventually won on first place on M! Countdown on June 10 and Inkigayo on June 20.

After their success in Korea, the band headed back to Japan. They released their first single "The Way" on June 23. For the first time, they charted in Oricon's Top 40 at number 26. The release was followed by their second single "I Don't Know Why" on September 16. The song reached number eight on the Oricon Daily Chart, marking the first time the band made it inside the top 10. The band then embarked on a small tour across Japan in order to promote the single.

The same year, Kang Min-hyuk and Lee Jong-hyun made their acting debut in the omnibus film Acoustic. They released a song for the movie's OST on October 7, entitled "High Fly".

=== 2011: Continued success in Korea and major Japanese debut ===
On January 9, CNBLUE released their third Japanese single, "Re-maintenance". They then kick start their 2011 Japanese promotions with a Zepp Tour in four cities – Osaka, Fukuoka, Nagoya and Tokyo – from January 9 to 16.

FNC Entertainment released teasers for a CNBLUE comeback in February 2011. However, the release date was later changed to March 21. The teaser was noted for having "more of the same departure from their pop rock sound into a heavier concept". CNBLUE released their first full-length album First Step with the lead single "Intuition" on March 21. The song earned the band a total of 7 music show wins, with three wins each on Mnet's M! Countdown and KBS Music Bank, thus marking the first time the band won "triple crown" on the shows. After wrapping up promotions of "Intuition" on April 24 on SBS' Inkigayo, they followed up with promotions of the song "Love Girl" from their special EP First Step +1 Thank You, beginning April 29 on Music Bank and ending on May 22. Thank You did well in the Taiwanese market as well, topping five charts locally and selling 70,000 copies.

In April, it was announced that Jung Yong-hwa and Kang Min-hyuk were cast in the MBC drama Heartstrings, which started airing on June 29. Yong-hwa sang three of the OSTs in Heartstrings, titled "You've Fallen for Me", "Because I Miss You" (composed by himself), and "Comfort Song", while Min-hyuk sang one OST titled "Star". They first performed the songs in their BLUESTORM concert on September 17 at the Olympic Hall, Seoul.

After wrapping up promotions in Korea, CNBLUE made a comeback in Japan with the release of their second and last independent album 392 on September 1. They also announced that they would make their major debut in Japan on October 19, 2011, under Warner Music Japan. The band released their debut single "In My Head" on October 19, composed by Jung Yong-hwa. The single peaked at number four on the Oricon Weekly Chart with 70,000+ units sold in its first week. It was later chosen as the theme song for Supernatural: The Animation. In November, "In My Head" claimed a gold record accreditation according to the RIAJ, meaning that the album sold over 100,000 copies within a month of going on sale.

=== 2012: Acting activities, Ear Fun, and Code Name Blue ===
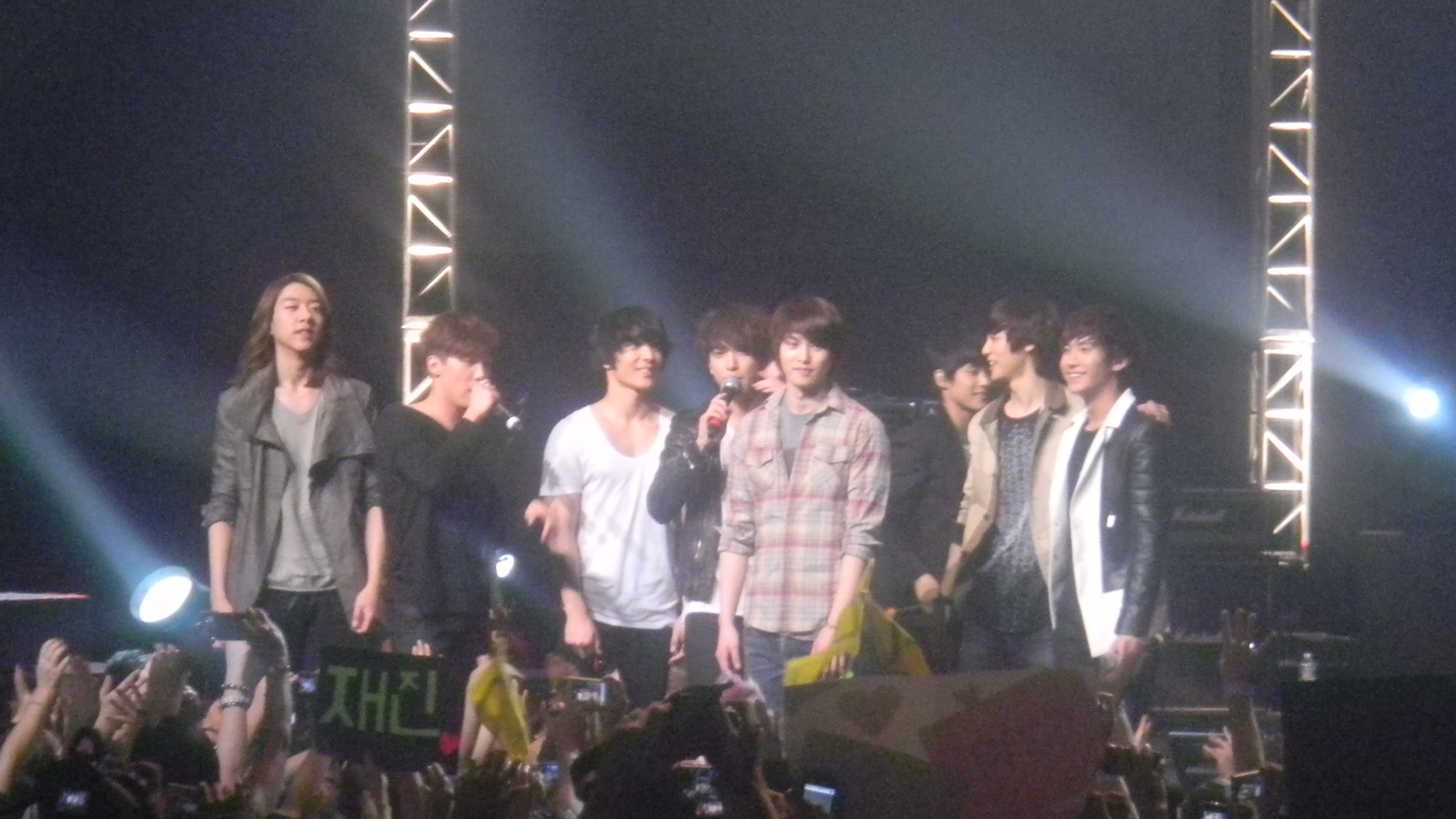
CNBLUE with F.T. Island during their Stand Up concert at Nokia Theatre L.A. Live, March 9, 2012

The band released a new single in Japan on February 1, titled "Where You Are", composed and co-written by Jung Yong-hwa. The physical single debuted at number one on the weekly Oricon Singles Chart with 60,398 copies sold in the first week. This made CNBLUE the first foreign band to top the Oricon Singles Chart since January 18, 1971 (when the Canadian band Mashmakhan released the single "Two in the Fog"), and made CNBLUE the fourth South Korean male artist/group to rank number 1 on Oricon's weekly singles chart, following TVXQ, JYJ and Jang Keun-suk.

CNBLUE and fellow label-mates F.T. Island performed in America for the first time at Los Angeles' Nokia Theater on March 9.

On March 26, the band released their third Korean EP, Ear Fun. The single "Still in Love" was released on March 16, ahead of the EP's release, and peaked at #3 on the Gaon Singles Chart; while the title song "Hey You" peaked at #1. The band wrapped up promotion with 4 music show award wins on April 22 with a goodbye performance on SBS' Inkigayo.

After completing their EP promotions, the members held their first fan meeting in Seoul on May 5. They also started preparing for their upcoming Japanese activities.

Their 3rd Japanese single "Come On" was released on August 1 and debuted at number five on the weekly Oricon Singles Chart with 38,000 copies sold. The song was composed by Lee Jong-hyun and written by Jung Yong-hwa in Korean, and later translated into Japanese. This was followed by the release of their Japanese debut album Code Name Blue on August 29 which placed number one on both the daily and weekly Oricon Albums Chart, selling a total of 57,744 copies at the end of its nine-week run. They became the first Korean group to achieve that feat with a debut album.

On September 22, they held their first exclusive concert, CNBLUE Live in London at IndigO2 in the UK. They performed 22 songs in front of over 3000 fans.

The concert ended in Seoul, South Korea on December 15 and 16 marked the band's fourth concert in Seoul, all of which were sold out in 10 minutes. On December 19, CNBLUE released their 4th Japanese single "Robot", which placed number two on both the daily and weekly Oricon Singles Chart, selling 45,640 copies.

CNBLUE's long-awaited South Korean comeback was officially announced at their 2012 CNBLUE Live BLUE NIGHT in Seoul concert on December 17. The release date for their fourth EP, Re:Blue, was set to be January 14, 2013. The first teaser was released on January 3, 2013 All individual video teasers were released on January 7. On January 9, a photo teaser was released for their photoshoot of the album made on the streets of London. The first music video teaser was released on January 10 along with a second one released one day later.

In 2012, all of the members received recognition for their acting endeavors, and CNBLUE was said to be the band that has conquered the year-end acting award ceremonies with their nominations. At the KBS Drama Awards, Kang Min-hyuk and Lee Jung-shin were nominated for the "Rookie Actor" award for their roles in My Husband Got a Family and Seoyoung, My Daughter respectively. Jung Yong-hwa was awarded the "Hallyu Star" award at the APAN Star Awards for his lead role in the 2011 drama Heartstrings due to its popularity in Asia. At the SBS Drama Awards, Lee Jong-hyun was awarded the "New Star" award for his role in A Gentleman's Dignity.

=== 2013: Re:Blue, Blue Moon World Tour, and What Turns You On? ===
On January 14, which is CNBLUE's third anniversary, the band's fourth EP Re:Blue and music video of the lead single "I'm Sorry" were released. "I'm Sorry" was co-composed and co-written by the band's leader, Jung Yong-hwa, marking it the first time for Jung's composition to be used as the band's title song in South Korea. Prior to the EP's release, Re:Blue reached over 100,000 copies of pre-orders. It eventually went on to top the Gaon Album Chart for two weeks in a row., selling a total of 126,000 copies. The single peaked at number 2 on the Gaon Digital Chart, and achieved an all-kill on music charts.

Re:Blue ranked #1 on the Billboard World Album Chart, Japan's Tower Records Chart. According to Taiwan's music site 'Omusic', the album and title track "I'm Sorry" ranked #1 on the single and album charts, respectively even before the official release in the country. After its official release in Taiwan, the album topped 8 different charts. The single "I'm Sorry" also ranked #1 in the MYX daily chart in the Philippines.

On January 22, FNC Entertainment announced CNBLUE's Blue Moon World Tour, stating that "They won't be going to just Asian countries such as China, Singapore, and Hong Kong, but also Europe, Australia, North America, and South America. The label confirmed stops for Taiwan, Singapore, Thailand, Hong Kong, Philippines, Malaysia, and Australia, and is in the process of planning America and Europe stops. Taiwan will be the first stop for the world tour starting on April 6, making them the first South Korean rock band to hold a world tour of this kind.

On April 20, FNC had announced that CNBLUE will be going on a ZEPP Tour in Japan with their first stop at Sapporo in Hokkaido on July 24 and 25, and the last stop at Namba in Osaka on August 14 and 15. There was a total of 10 concerts in 5 cities. This was held while the Blue Moon world tour was still ongoing. It was later revealed that the ZEPP Tour is titled Lady Zepp Tour after announcing the name of their upcoming 6th Japanese single titled Lady on June 18.

On April 24, CNBLUE released their fifth Japanese single, "Blind Love", written and co-composed by Lee Jong-hyun. The physical single debuted at number two on Oricon Daily Single Chart with 35,773 copies sold, the highest first day sale for CNBLUE's Japanese releases.

On July 17, the official music video for CNBLUE's sixth Japanese single "Lady" was released. The physical single was later released on July 31, 2013, and ranked at number 4 on Oricon Singles Chart, selling 42,169 copies in its first week.

CNBLUE had also participated in the annual two-day Japanese rock festival Summer Sonic 2013 as one of the line-ups along with their labelmate F.T. Island and rock bands like Linkin Park, Metallica, and ONE OK ROCK. This was held at Tokyo and Osaka on August 10 and 11 respectively

On August 13, they released the music video of "One More Time" for their upcoming second Japanese studio album What Turns You On?. On August 28, the studio album was released. It includes the previous three singles, "Robot", "Blind Love" and "Lady". It debuted at number two on the Oricon Albums Chart and sold 43,492 copies.

On November 26, CNBLUE released their first ever "best-of" album in Korea, titled Present with the Korean version of the band's Japanese songs. All of the members reportedly took part in the translation of the lyrics.

=== 2014: Can't Stop, Wave, and Notable performances ===
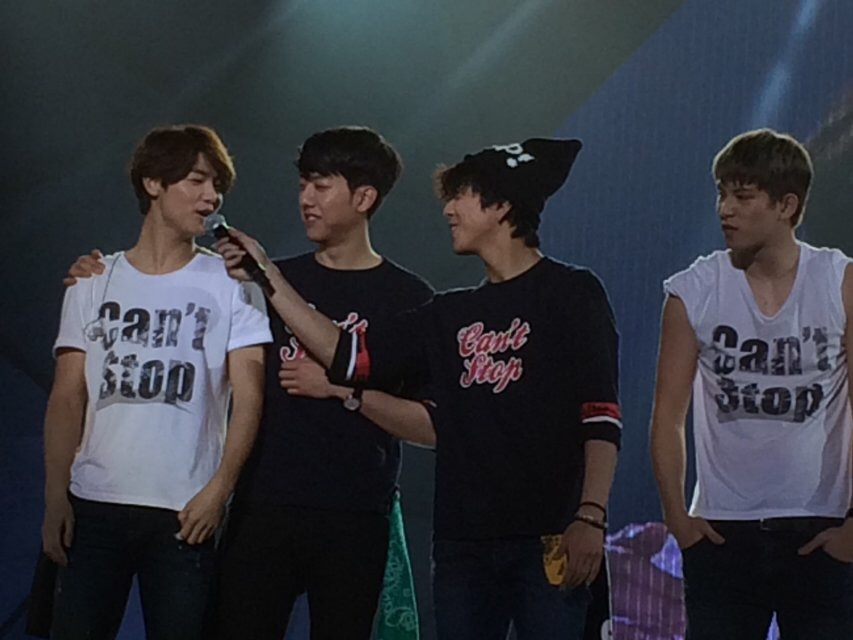
CNBLUE during its Can't Stop concert tour in Nanjing, China, 2014

On February 23, 2014, CNBLUE released their fifth EP, Can't Stop. The album debuted at #2 on the Gaon Album Chart and went on to top the chart the following week. The lead single "Can't Stop" peaked at #3 on the Gaon Digital Chart. On March 2, the band had their comeback performance on SBS's All Live Comeback Show: Can't Stop.

After finishing their promoting activities in Korea, CNBLUE released a new Japanese single "Truth" on April 23, 2014. The band then embarked on their 2014 CNBLUE LIVE- Can't Stop Tour, which kick-start in Daegu on May 24. On August 20, they released their 8th Japanese single, "Go Your Way".

CNBLUE released "Radio" on September 8, as a digital download in precedence of their third Japanese studio album Wave. Released on September 17, Wave debuted at number three on the weekly Oricon Albums Chart. By the end of its chart run, Wave sold 42,080 copies in the country. The band then embarked on the CNBLUE 2014 Arena Tour: Wave from October to November in Aichi, Tokyo, Osaka, Miyagi, and Fukuoka.

On October 4, the band performed at the closing ceremony of 2014 Incheon Asian Games.

On December 6, CNBLUE was the only Korean artist to participate at the 2015 iQiyi All-Star Carnival in Beijing, China, where they received the "Best Asia Group" award.

CNBLUE's song "Can't Stop" was the 17th most tweeted song of 2014, according to the news website Mashable. They were the highest ranked Korean artist (followed by Girls' Generation's "Mr. Mr" at number 18 and Infinite's "Last Romeo" at number 48) on a list of "Twitter's 50 Most-Tweeted Songs of 2014" which included worldwide artists like John Legend, Ariana Grande, Beyonce, Pharrell Williams, Lady GaGa, Enrique Iglesias, Maroon 5, Coldplay and One Direction Billboard K-Town included the EP on their list of the "10 Best K-Pop Albums of 2014" at #9, calling the tracks "Can't Stop" and "Like a Child" "some of the most accessible Korean rock tunes to come out of the scene this year," and "Cold Love" a "gritty ballad" and "Diamond Girl" a feisty rock jam.

=== 2015: 2gether, Colors and Arena tour ===
Throughout the first half of 2015, CNBLUE continued to pursue solo activities. In April 2015, the band released its ninth single "White" under Warner Music Japan. The single peaked at number four on the weekly Oricon Singles Chart, selling over 28,000 copies since its release.

After an absence of domestic band promotions in one year and seven months in, CNBLUE released their second studio album 2gether and lead single "Cinderella" on September 14. The album debuted at number two on the Gaon Album Chart and went on to top the chart the following week. The single peaked at number 10 on the Gaon Digital Chart, ultimately earning the band five music show wins.

2gether was met with generally favorably reviews from music critics, particular for its use for electronic elements. Jung Min-jae of online magazine IZM noted the band for "adhering to a wide-range of pop rock genres", and that the band's "signature smooth melodies and waving grooves are more attractive than ever". Jung Hae-wook of News Tomato complimented the band on the mixture of electronic rock and being able to form a distinct sound between the tracks, as well as their effort to experiment in order to establish its musical identity. Jeff Benjamin of Billboard stated that in spite of the change in direction of the band's music on the album, their "sentimental songwriting" and "vivacious energy" persisted.

CNBLUE released "Supernova" on September 9 as a digital download in precedence of CNBLUE's fourth Japanese studio album Colors. Released on September 30, the album debuted at number one on the weekly Oricon Albums Chart, selling 31,000 copies in its first week. It is the first time the band topped the chart since Code Name Blue, released three years and one month prior. The band embarked on the CNBLUE 2015 Arena Tour: Be a Supernova from November 3 to December 3. The concerts took place at the Big Hat arena in Nagano, the Yoyogi National Gymnasium in Tokyo, the Nippon Gaishi Hall in Aichi, the Sun Dome in Fukui, and the Osaka-jō Hall in Osaka.

=== 2016: Blueming, Euphoria, and 5th anniversary tour ===
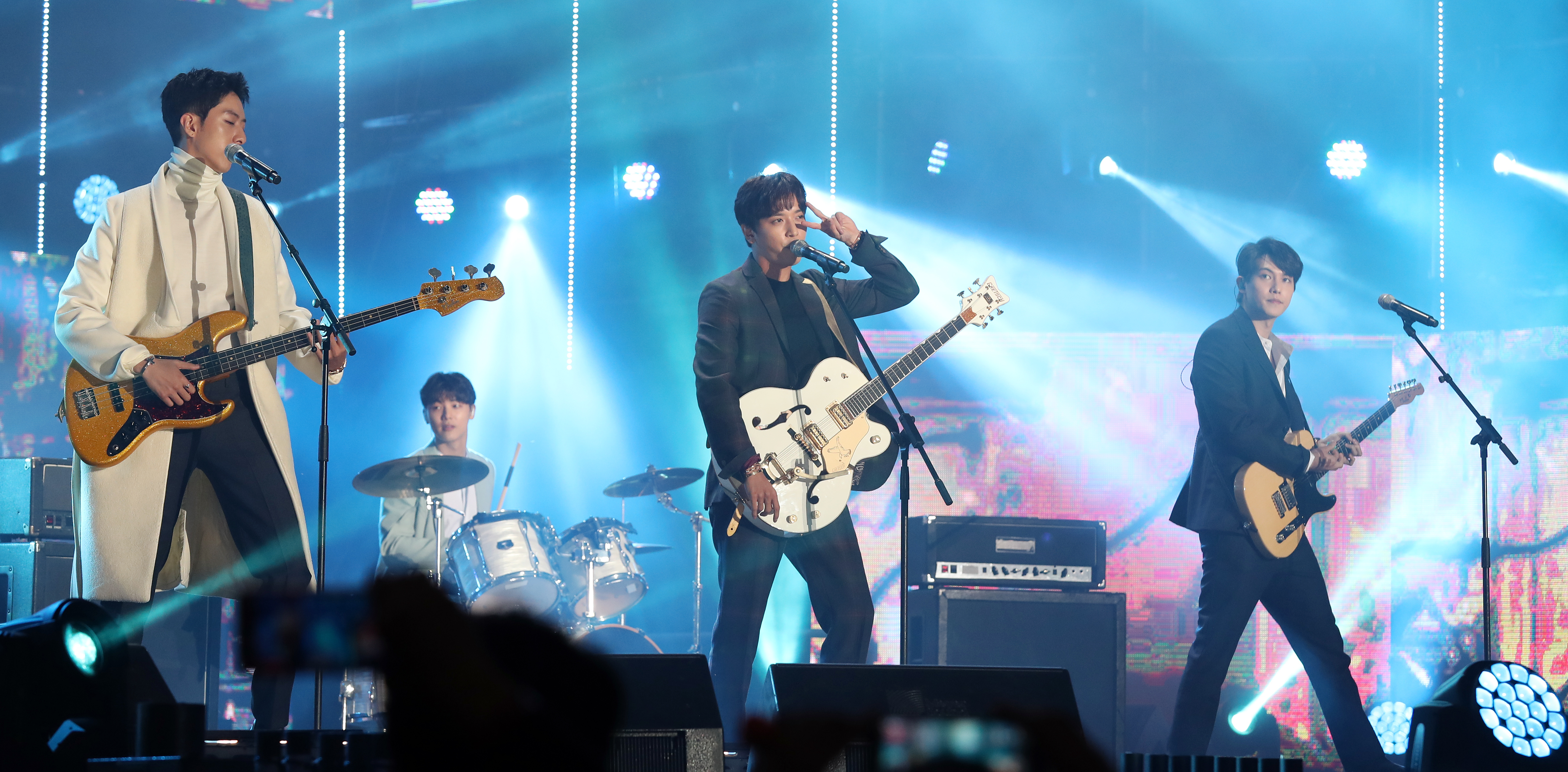
CNBLUE at Korea Sale Festa in 2016

CNBLUE released their sixth mini-album Blueming and its lead single "You're So Fine" on April 4, 2016. Blueming topped the Gaon Album Chart upon its release. "You're So Fine" earned the band six music show wins. The band also released their 10th Japanese single "Puzzle" on May 11. It debuted at number four on the weekly Oricon Singles Chart; the single charted for four weeks and went on to sell over 30,000 copies by the end of its chart run.

CNBLUE released their fifth Japanese album Euphoria on October 19. Euphoria debuted at number two on the Oricon Albums Chart. By the end of its chart run, the album sold 36,074 copies in the country.

The band embarked on their fifth anniversary arena tour, Our Glory Days from November 2 to November 29, 2016. The concerts took place at the Makuhari Messe Event Hall in Chiba, the Osaka-jō Hall in Osaka, the Nippon Gaishi Hall in Aichi, the Marine Messe Fukuoka arena in Fukuoka, and the Nippon Budokan in Tokyo. Performing 22 songs at each concert, the tour accumulated 75,000 attendees in total. The November 18 show in Aichi was recorded and is scheduled to air on WOWOW on January 15, 2017.

=== 2017: 7°CN, Shake, Stay Gold, and concert tours ===
Almost a year after the release of Blueming, CNBLUE released their seventh EP, 7°CN, on March 20, 2017.

CNBLUE released their 14th single, "Shake" on May 10, 2017. It debuted on the weekly Oricon Singles Chart at number five. The band then embarked on the CNBLUE Spring Live 2017 "Shake! Shake!" arena tour. They held two concerts each in Tokyo, Aichi, and Osaka, starting from May 17 to June 22.

The band also held their 2017 CNBLUE Live: Between Us concert tour on six countries from July 1 to December 9. The initial pair of shows took place between June 3 and 4 in Seoul.

CNBLUE released their sixth-major label Japanese studio album, Stay Gold. It debuted at number three on Japan's national weekly Oricon Albums Chart. The band embarked on the CNBLUE 2017 Arena Tour Live "Starting Over" from November 3 to December 1.

=== 2018–2019: Military enlistment and Jonghyun's departure ===
The band went on hiatus because the members were doing military service; before they did, they released Best of CNBLUE/OUR BOOK [2011-2018] on August 29. The album contained songs from their debut in Japan in 2011.

On August 28, 2019, Jonghyun announced he was leaving CNBLUE due to his connections with the Burning Sun scandal and backlash over inappropriate messages towards a YouTuber.

=== 2020–2023: Return from military, Contract renewal, Re-Code, "Zoom", and Wanted, and first Korean music festival appearance ===
On October 20, 2020, it was announced that the 3 remaining members of CNBLUE had successfully renewed their contracts and are releasing their eighth mini album, Re-Code and its lead single "Then, Now and Forever", on November 17.

CNBLUE launched a reality-variety show, Secret Tour: Don't Call My Name to celebrate their 10th debut anniversary. The show aired every Friday from November 13 to November 20, 2020 on tvN.

CNBLUE released their 15th single, "Zoom" on June 23, 2021.

CNBLUE released their ninth mini-album, Wanted and its lead single "Love Cut" on October 20.

On August 8, 2022, CNBLUE joined the Weverse platform.

On December 25, 2023, CNBLUE played at Someday Christmas Festival in Busan, their first-ever appearance at a Korean music festival.

=== 2024–2025: Asia tours, continued university and music festival stages, Tiny Desk Korea, "Jinsei Sanka" and [X] ===
In early 2024, CNBLUE held an Asian tour titled "2024 CNBLUE Live 'CNBLUENTITY' in Asia." The tour started in Hong Kong on March 16, followed by performances in Bangkok on March 23, Kaohsiung on April 6, Macau on April 13, Kuala Lumpur on April 20, Singapore on April 27, and concluded in Jakarta on May 25.

On August 5, CNBLUE announced a new Asia tour titled 'Voyage into X,' which was scheduled to be held in five countries: South Korea, China (Macau), Taiwan, Thailand, Malaysia, and Hong Kong.

On September 23, CNBLUE appeared on Tiny Desk Korea. They said, "The format of 'Tiny Desk Korea' reminded us of our early days doing street performances. We had fun and felt like we were going back to our roots. It feels like we've been working hard with the same mindset we had when we first started, and we want to keep that spirit alive going forward. We hope that CNBLUE’s songs can bring strength to those going through tough times."

On September 30, CNBLUE officially announced the release of CNBLUE's 10th mini album, [X], which was scheduled for October 14.

On October 9, CNBLUE released the single "Jinsei Sanka (Life Anthem)" in Japan. In addition to the title track it including "Countdown," featuring Takuya from UVERworld, and "Magic Hour." "Jinsei Sanka" peaked at number seven on the Oricon Weekly Singles chart.

On January 23, 2025, CNBLUE announced its first concert tour to North America since 2014, as part of Voyage Into X. The tour includes stops in Toronto, New York City, Los Angeles, and San Francisco.

On November 5, 2025, CNBLUE released the single "Shintoya" in Japan. It reached number one on the Oricon Weekly Singles chart.

CNBLUE continued to appear at university and music festivals in Korea, including Korea University, Dankook University, Peak Festa, Awesome Stage Busan, Soundberry Festa Seoul, Awesome Stage Daegu, Soundberry Festa Busan, Kyunghee University, Soongsil University, Busan International Rock Festival, Grand Mint Festival, and Rock 7 Prime Festival.

=== 2026: "3logy", second world tour, and continued university and music festival appearances ===
On November 13, 2025, CNBLUE announced the upcoming release of the third Korean full-length studio album "3logy." On January 1, 2026, CNBLUE prereleased the track "Still, A Flower." The full album was released on January 7, 2026, with the MV of the title track "Killer Joy."

"Killer Joy" was promoted with a live challenge featuring cover versions of the chorus of the song by more than 40 South Korean artists.

On January 17, CNBLUE began its second World Tour with two concerts in Seoul. The tour continued throughout 2026 with stops in Macau, Taipei, Melbourne, Sydney, Auckland, Singapore, Kuala Lumpur, Jakarta, Yokohama, Aichi (canceled), Kobe, Hong Kong, Bangkok, Kaohsiung, Berlin, Paris, London, The Hague, Tokyo, and Busan.

In addition, CNBLUE continued to perform at music and university festivals in South Korea including First Music Station Festival, Awesome Festival, Myongji University Festival, Hanyang University Festival, Seoul Jazz Festival, Seoul Park Music Festival, Soundberry Festival, Sound Planet Festival, Asia Top Artist Festival, Busan International Rock Festival, and Grand Mint Festival.

On November 26 CNBLUE appeared at a joint concert, UVERworld LIVE 2026 at LaLa Arena Tokyo-Bay, a followup to their 2024 joint concert with UVERworld in Seoul and Tokyo.

CNBLUE also performed concerts following two baseball games, at the G!POP Music Festival at Taipei Dome in Taiwan on May 31 and at the Doosan Bears D-Stage at Jamsil Baseball Stadium in Seoul on June 2.

== Controversy ==
CNBLUE and its agency FNC Entertainment were sued by Korean punk band Crying Nut for unauthorized use of their song "Pilsal Off-Side" on Mnet's "M Countdown" in 2010. Crying Nut also charged that CNBLUE had released a DVD of the concert in Japan and profited from it. Crying Nut claimed that not only did CNBLUE use the song without permission, but also lip-synced along with the original Crying Nut recording. Crying Nut allegedly posted online that CNBLUE "must pay the penalties for intellectual property rights infringement". CNBLUE later countersued Crying Nut for allegedly accusing CNBLUE of copyright infringement, filing an injunction against Crying Nut's online criticisms, claiming that the intellectual property theft was the responsibility of CJ E&M and the unspecified company responsible for the DVD sales. However, after years of debate in court, CNBLUE lost the lawsuit and its agency was fined 15 million won.

== Philanthropy ==
CNBLUE undertakes philanthropy work such as donating money and rice to the needy from time to time. Part of their yearly income and the income from the Bluemoon World Tour have been contributed to the construction of CNBLUE Schools. The first CNBLUE School was built in Burkina Faso, Africa in 2012 and can accommodate up to 100 pre-schoolers and 1 000 elementary and junior high school students. CNBLUE Schools will provide meals and daycare services for the enrolled students. In 2014, a second CNBLUE school was built in the Philippines.

In July 2021, CNBLUE participated in a summer donation campaign by Happy Bean through the non-profit foundation, LOVE FNC. The proceeds from the sold goods have been donated to support the education of children affected by COVID-19 in Myanmar, Cambodia, and Mongolia.

== Members ==
Current members

- Jung Yong-hwa – leader, guitars, main vocals, rap
- Kang Min-hyuk – drums
- Lee Jung-shin – bass, rap

Former members

- Kwon Kwang-jin – bass
- Lee Jong-hyun – guitars, vocals

== Discography ==
Korean albums

Studio albums

- First Step (2011)
- 2gether (2015)
- 3Logy (2026)

Japanese albums

Studio albums

- Thank U (2010)
- 392 (2011)
- Code Name Blue (2012)
- What Turns You On? (2013)
- Wave (2014)
- Colors (2015)
- Euphoria (2016)
- Stay Gold (2017)
- Pleasures (2023)
- Full Circle (2026)

== Concerts and tours ==
=== World Tours ===
- Blue Moon World Tour (2013)
- 3logy World Tour (2026)

=== Asia Tours ===
- Listen to the CNBLUE Asia Tour (2010)
- Blue Storm Asia Tour (2011–12)
- CNBLUE Live "Can't Stop" (2014)
- CNBLUE Live "Come Together" (2015–16)
- CNBLUE Live "BETWEEN US" (2017)
- CNBLUE Live "CNBLUENTITY" (2024)
- CNBLUE Live "VOYAGE into X" (2024)

=== Japan Tours ===
- Zepp Tour～RE-MAINTENANCE～ (2011)
- Winter Tour～Here, In my head～ (2011)
- Fanclub tour～Where you are～ (2012)
- Arena Tour～COME ON!!!～ (2012)
- Zepp Tour～Lady～ (2013)
- Arena Tour～ONE MORE TIME～ (2013)
- Spring Live～Truth～(2014)
- Arena Tour～Wave～ (2014)
- Spring Live～White～(2015)
- Arena Tour～Be a Supernova～ (2015)
- Spring Live～We're Like a Puzzle～(2016)
- Arena Tour～Our Glory Days～(2016)
- CNBLUE Spring Live 2017 Shake! Shake! (2017)
- Arena tour ~Starting Over~ (2017)
- CNBLUE AUTUMN CONCERT 2022 ~LET IT SHINE~ (2022)
- CNBLUE ZEPP TOUR 2023 ～CALLING～ (2023)
- CNBLUE AUTUMN TOUR 2024 ～LIFE ANTHEM～ (2024)

=== Concert participation ===
- 2022 FNC KINGDOM - STAR STATION (2022)
- 2026 FNC BAND KINGDOM - HONGKONG STATION (2.28 - 3.1 rainy version a.k.a. FNC BAND WATERBOMB)

== Awards and nominations ==
Awards and achievements
| Preceded by Supreme Team | 12th Mnet Asian Music Awards - Best New Male Artist; 2010 | Succeeded by Huh Gak |
| Preceded by Hot Potato | 13th Mnet Asian Music Awards - Best Band Performance; 2011 | Succeeded by Busker Busker |
| Preceded by Busker Busker | 16th Mnet Asian Music Awards - Best Band Performance; 2014 | Succeeded by CNBLUE |
| Preceded by CNBLUE | 17th Mnet Asian Music Awards - Best Band Performance; 2015 | Succeeded by CNBLUE |
| Preceded by CNBLUE | 18th Mnet Asian Music Awards - Best Band Performance; 2016 | Succeeded by Hyukoh |
