= Code Name Blue =

- Regular edition cover

Studio album by CN Blue
- Released: August 29, 2012
- Recorded: 2011–2012
- Genre: Rock
- Length: 46:58
- Language: Japanese
- Label: Warner Music Japan

CN Blue chronology
Ear Fun (2012)	Code Name Blue (2012)	Re:Blue (2013)

Singles from Code Name Blue
- 1. "In My Head" Released: October 19, 2011; 2. "Where You Are" Released: February 1, 2012; 3. "Come On" Released: August 1, 2012

Code Name Blue is a Japanese album by the South Korean rock band CNBlue. It was released on August 29, 2012 as the group's third Japanese album and their first major album under Warner Music Japan.

== Background ==
The album was announced on June 25, along with the details of the group's sixth Japanese single "Come On". The album would be released in three editions: CD+DVD limited, Regular edition and a CD+DVD Lawson limited edition. Every edition comes with a different jacket cover and a different features: the CD+DVD edition includes the CD, a DVD including a music video of the song "Time is Over" and a special feature from this music video, an English version of the song "Where You Are" as bonus track, five calendar cards and a serial code type D. The CD+DVD Lawson edition includes the CD, a special DVD including the special showcase ""Where You Are" Release live at Tokyo Dome City Hall 2012.2.5" and a serial code type E. This version will only be sold on Lawson. The regular edition comes with the CD only itself and a serial code type E, only available in first press editions.

== Composition ==
The album comes with 13 songs, 3 singles, 3 songs already released on the singles and 7 new songs. Most of the songs on the album were composed and written by the members Jung Yong-hwa and Lee Jong-hyun. Yong-hwa wrote the songs "In My Head", "Where You Are" (both Japanese and English versions), "Time is Over", "Have a Good Night", "Wake Up", "No More", "Mr. KIA (Know It All)" and "Come On". Jong-hyun composed the songs "No More", "These Days", "Get Away" and "Come On".

== Singles ==
Three songs from the album were released as singles:

The first single, "In My Head", was released on October 19, 2011 as the group's first major single and fourth single overall. The song was written by Kenji Tamai and Yoshifumi Kanamaru and composed by Jung Yong-hwa. The song was chosen to be the ending theme song of Supernatural: The Animation, an animated version of the TV series Supernatural. The song ranked number 4 in Oricon's Weekly chart with around 85,000 copies sold in total at the date. The single was certified Gold by RIAJ for the shipment of 100,000 copies. The song "Mr. KIA (Know It All)", one of the b-sides from the single, will be included on the album.

The second single, "Where You Are", was released on February 1, 2012 as the group's second major single and fifth single overall. It was written by Kenji Tamai and both written and composed by Jung Yong-hwa. The song ranked number 1 in Oricon's Weekly chart with around 72,000 copies sold at the date. It is the first #1 single of the group on the country and first for a foreign band since 1971. The b-side "Get Away", used as ending theme song for Japanese broadcast of American TV series Gossip Girl, will be included on the album. An English version of the song will be included as a bonus track of the limited CD+DVD version of the album.

The third and final single, "Come On", was released on August 1, 2012 as the group's third major single and sixth single overall. The song was originally written by Jung Yong-hwa and translated in Japanese by Kenji Tamai and composed by Lee Jong-hyun. It ranked number 5 in Oricon's Weekly singles chart with around 38,000 copies sold at the date. The b-side "Wake Up", one of the b-sides included on the single, will be included on the album.

== Track listing ==
Track list
No.	Title	Lyrics	Music	Arrangement	Length
1.	"Intro 02"		Jung Yong-hwa	Jung Yong-hwa	1:29
2.	"In My Head"	Kenji Tamai, Yoshifumi Kanamaru	Jung Yong-hwa	Kenji Tamai, Rui Momota	4:15
3.	"Where You Are"	Jung Yong-hwa, Kenji Tamai	Jung Yong-hwa	Kenji Tamai, Rui Momota	3:44
4.	"Time is Over"	Jung Yong-hwa, Kosuke Oba (Japanese lyrics translator)	Jung Yong-hwa, Kosuke Oba	Suzuki "Daichi" Hideyuki	3:48
5.	"Have a Good Night"	Jung Yong-hwa	Jung Yong-hwa	Kenji Tamai, Kousuke Noma	3:32
6.	"Wake Up"	Jung Yong-hwa	Ryo, Jung Yong-hwa	Kenji Tamai, Kousuke Noma	2:57
7.	"No More"	Jung Yong-hwa	Lee Jong-hyun, Jung Yong-hwa	Kenji Tamai, Masahiro Tobinai	3:42
8.	"These Days"	Kosuke Oba	Lee Jong-hyun	Suzuki "Daichi" Hideyuki	4:34
9.	"Blue Sky"	Kosuke Oba	Shusui, Seiji Motoyama	Yuichiro Horiuchi	4:17
10.	"Mr. KIA (Know It All)"	Jung Yong-hwa	Ryo, Jung Yong-hwa	Kenji Tamai, Kousuke Noma	3:32
11.	"With Me"	Daichi, Miyakei	Daichi	Suzuki "Daichi" Hideyuki	4:07
12.	"Get Away"	Nozomi Maezawa & Agehasprings	Ryo, Lee Jong-hyun	Kenji Tamai, Shunsuke Tsuri	3:32
13.	"Come On"	Jung Yong-hwa, Kenji Tamai (Japanese lyrics translator)	Lee Jong-hyun	Kenji Tamai, Rui Momota	3:36
Total length:					46:58

Limited CD+DVD edition and iTunes Store bonus track:
No.	Title	Lyrics	Music	Arrangement	Length
14.	"Where You Are" (English version)	Jung Yong-hwa	Jung Yong-hwa	Kenji Tamai, Rui Momota	3:44
Total length:					50:41

DVD (Limited CD+DVD edition)
No.	Title	Length
1.	"Time is Over" (Music video)
2.	"Time is Over" (Music video - Special feature)

DVD (Lawson limited CD+DVD edition): "Where You Are" Release live at Tokyo Dome City Hall 2012.2.5
No.	Title	Length
1.	"In My Head"
2.	"Mr. KIA (Know It All)"
3.	"Rain of Blessing"
4.	"Feeling"
5.	"Get Away"
6.	"Where You Are"

== Chart performance ==
The album debuted at number 1 in Oricon's albums daily chart with 21,982 copies sold on the first day and also first in Oricon's weekly album chart with 45,151 copies sold in the first week. It is the first number one album of the group in Japan (third overall counting with "Where You Are" and "Come On"), first from a South Korean artist that debuted first in Japan and third from a Korean rock artist/band, along with F.T. Island's Five Treasure Island and Jang Keun-suk's Just Crazy.

=== Charts ===
==== Oricon ====
Oricon Chart	Peak	Debut Sales	Sales Total	Chart Run
Daily Singles Chart	1	21,982	57,744	9 weeks
Weekly Singles Chart	1	45,151	57,744	9 weeks
Monthly Singles Chart	7	45,151	57,744	9 weeks
Yearly Singles Chart	—	—	57,744	9 weeks

==== Other charts ====
Chart	Peak position
Billboard Japan Top Albums	2

== Release history ==
Country	Date	Format	Label
Japan	August 29, 2012	CD, Digital download	Warner Music Japan
Taiwan	September 17, 2012	CD	Warner Music Taiwan
