= Lee Jong-hyun =

South Korean musician and actor (born 1990)

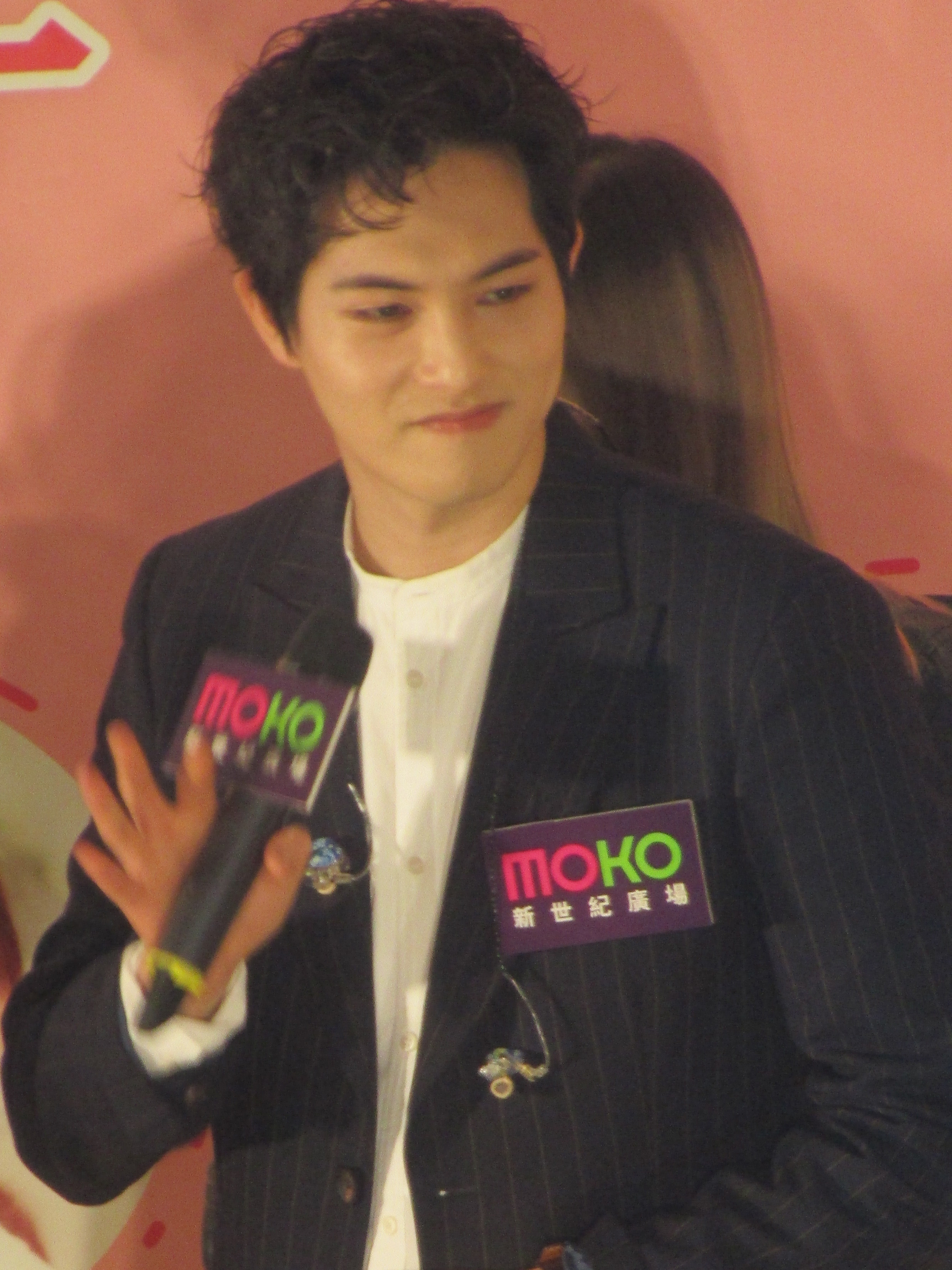
- Lee at MOKO
- Born: May 15, 1990 (age 36); Busan, South Korea
- Occupations: Guitarist; musician; singer; songwriter; actor
- Musical career
- Genres: Rock; Pop; R&B; Synthpop
- Instruments: Guitar; piano; bass guitar; harmonica
- Years active: 2009–2019
- Label: FNC
- Formerly of: CNBLUE
- Website: fncent.com

Korean name
- Hangul: 이종현
- Hanja: 李宗泫
- RR: I Jonghyeon
- MR: I Chonghyŏn

Lee Jong-hyun (Korean: 이종현; born May 15, 1990), also known by his mononym Jonghyun, is a South Korean musician, singer-songwriter and actor. He was the former lead guitarist and vocalist of South Korean rock band CNBLUE. He made his acting debut in an omnibus movie Acoustic in 2010, followed by his television debut in the Korean drama A Gentleman's Dignity in 2012. He appeared in television dramas Orange Marmalade (2015), Girls' Generation 1979 (2017) and Evergreen (2018).

In August 2019, Lee departed CNBLUE after the backlash over a private direct message towards a YouTuber, and amidst allegations of him viewing illicit videos and having inappropriate sexual conversations degrading women in the Jung Joon-young KakaoTalk chatrooms, a part of Burning Sun scandal.

== Life and career ==
=== Early life ===
Lee Jong-hyun was born on May 15, 1990, in Busan, South Korea. His family consists of his parents and two older sisters. He lived in Busan before his family moved to Japan when he was four years old. His family moved back to Busan and he finished his elementary school and middle school there.

He was an ulzzang at "BESTNINE" alongside Mblaq's Lee Joon, fellow member Jung Yong-hwa, and Block B's Jaehyo before debut.

The talent scouter from FNC Music (currently known as FNC Entertainment) who visited Busan to see Jung, came across Lee in the street, and suggested him to audition at the company. On his way to his audition, he met his current fellow CNBLUE member Jung at the Seoul Station. They then met Kang Min-hyuk, also a current fellow member of CNBLUE, at FNC Music where they auditioned. Eventually, only the three of them passed the auditions and Lee began training in bass technology at FNC Academy.

Before Lee embarked on his musical career, he was a judo athlete who won a gold medal in a judo championship amongst athletes in his hometown when he was in high school. However, he decided to give up on sports upon realizing that this was not the field that he would excel in after losing in a match in just a few seconds. He then started to focus on music. At first, he learned singing, then piano. Then, upon watching English singer-songwriter and guitarist Eric Clapton playing the guitar, he was inspired to learn to play the guitar.

=== Music career ===
Lee debuted with CNBLUE in South Korea on January 14, 2010 with their lead single "I'm a Loner". Before their Korean debut, they debuted as an indie band, with Lee being the leader, in Japan in August 2009. Jung Yong-hwa then took over his place following the band's Korean debut. They made their major debut in Japan in October 2011.

Lee, together with Jung, composed many of the band's released songs, such as "Blind Love", "Lie", "Rain of Blessing", "Kimio", "My Miracle", "Come On", "No More", "These Days" etc., which all gained positive feedback. "Come On" ranked number 5 on Oricon's Weekly singles chart while "Blind Love" ranked number 4. "Get Away", one of his compositions, was used as the ending theme song for the Japanese broadcast of American TV series Gossip Girl.

Lee released his first solo single "My Love" in 2012, as part of the soundtrack for SBS drama A Gentleman's Dignity, which he starred in. The song was written by Lee himself. "My Love" debuted at number four on the Gaon Digital Chart. It eventually became the 34th best-selling song in South Korea that year with 2,187,150 digital downloads. The song earned Lee five award nominations, ultimately winning "Best OST" at the 2013 Seoul Music Awards.

In December 2013, Lee and his fellow label-mate Juniel formed a duo called "Romantic J" and released a digital single album titled "Love Falls". Inspired by the movie Music and Lyrics, the song was compose by Lee, with lyrics written by Juniel. The single peaked at #27 on the Melon Chart. The duo subsequently promoted the song through Mnet's M Countdown and SBS MTV's The Show.

On August 2, 2015, Lee held his first solo fan meeting in Japan at the Tokyo International Forum and met with 10,000 fans.

Lee made his solo debut in July 2016, with the studio album Sparkling Night. The album debuted at number seven on the weekly Oricon Albums Chart and number nine on Billboard Japan magazine's Hot Albums, eventually selling 13,529 copies. Lee then embarked on the "Welcome to Sparkling Night" tour, his first series of solo concerts. The first two concerts took place from August 9–10 at the Osaka International Convention Center in Osaka, followed by a concert on August 13 at the Nagoya Congress Center in Aichi, and two final concerts from August 17–18 at the Tokyo International Forum in Tokyo.

=== Acting career ===
In 2010, Lee made his acting debut in the omnibus film Acoustic alongside fellow member Kang Min-hyuk.

On May 27, 2012, Lee made his small screen debut in SBS weekend drama A Gentleman's Dignity. He earned positive reception for his debut role and won the "New Star" award at the year-end SBS Drama Awards.

In May 2015, Lee starred in the fantasy high-school drama Orange Marmalade, alongside labelmate Seolhyun from AOA, where he plays a vampire. He also joined the fourth season of the Korean reality show We Got Married, pairing with actress Gong Seung-yeon. Shortly after, he reunited with Gong in the youth historical drama My Only Love Song.

In 2017, he starred in the teen drama Lingerie Girls' Generation in which he played a former gangster of Daegu who turned to be a kindhearted local handy man. The same year, he was cast in the Japanese film Ikiru Machi, which is about the Great East Japan Earthquake in 2011.

In 2018, Lee starred in the fantasy romance drama That Man Oh Soo opposite Kim So-eun.

== Controversy and departure ==
=== Inside trading of stocks ===
In June 2016, Lee and fellow CNBLUE member Jung Yong-hwa were accused of insider trading of FNC stocks based on information that their label, (FNC Entertainment), was signing popular comedian, host, and television personality Yoo Jae-suk. While Jung was acquitted of all charges, Lee was fined. Lee apologized and stated that he bought the stocks without verifying the information, but once he realized legal issues could result from the purchase, he held onto the stocks.

=== Group chat rooms ===
On March 12, 2019 Lee's agency issued a statement that Lee was not connected to alleged chat rooms and sexual activities, which Jung Joon-young was part of. However, on March 14, it was reported that Lee was involved in the Burning Sun scandal with Jung in a one-to-one chatroom where Jung had shared sexual hidden camera footages of himself as Lee engaged in "inappropriate sexual conversations, and inappropriate conversations degrading women". On March 15, 2019, Lee admitted that he watched sex videos shared by Jung and he had made disparaging remarks about the women filmed. Investigation is still ongoing. In August 2019, Lee departed CNBLUE after the backlash over inappropriate messages he sent to a YouTuber, which brought renewed attention to the Burning Sun issue.

== Philanthropy ==
The proceeds collected from "LEE JONG HYUN Solo Concert in Japan - METROPOLIS" which was held in June 2018 were donated for the Great East Japan Earthquake and the Kumamoto Earthquake through the Japanese Red Cross Society.

== Mandatory military service ==
Lee enlisted in his military service in August 2018.

Lee was officially discharged from his military service on March 25, 2020.

== Filmography ==
=== Television series ===
Year	Title	Role	Network	Notes	Ref.
2012	A Gentleman's Dignity	Collin Black	SBS		
2013	Puberty Medley	Yang Yeong-woong	KBS2	Cameo, Ep 2–3	
2014	One Sunny Day	Couple guy	Line TV	Cameo, Ep 4 & 8	
2015	Orange Marmalade	Han Si-hoo	KBS2		
2017	My Only Love Song	On Dal	Naver TVcast, Netflix		
2017	Girls' Generation 1979	Joo Young-choon	KBS2		
2018	Evergreen	Oh Soo	OCN		

=== Film ===
Year	Title	Role	Notes	Ref.
2010	Acoustic	Kim Seong-won	Segment: "Bakery Attack"	
2018	Ikiru Machi	Do-hyun		

=== Variety show ===
Year	Title	Network	Notes	Ref.
2015	We Got Married	MBC	Cast member (with Gong Seung-yeon)	
2015	Fluttering India	KBS	Cast member (with Changmin, Kyuhyun, Min-ho, Suho and Sung-kyu)	
2015	Cool Kiz on the Block	KBS	Ep. 125: "The Tenth Sport, Judo"	
2016	Battle Trip	KBS	Ep. 10: "The Real Men's Trip" with Joonyoung & Taejoon	
2017	King of Mask Singer	MBC	Contestant as "All Together Cube One Wheel" (Episodes 101–102)	
2017	Law of the Jungle	SBS	Season 34, Cook Islands with Kim Byung-man, JB, Solbin)	

== Discography ==
=== Albums ===
Title	Album details	Peak chart positions	Sales
Title	Album details	JPN	Sales
Sparkling Night	Released: July 27, 2016; Label: Warner Music Japan; Formats: CD, digital download	7	JPN: 13,529
Metropolis	Released: January 24, 2018; Label: Warner Music Japan; Formats: CD, digital download	7	JPN: 9,462

=== Singles ===
Title	Year	Peak positions		Sales	Album
Title	Year	KOR Gaon	KOR Billboard	Sales	Album
"High Fly" (with Kang Min-hyuk)	2010	102	—		Acoustic OST
"My Love" (내 사랑아)	2012	4	2	KOR (DL): 2,187,150	A Gentleman's Dignity OST 2
"Love Falls" (사랑이 내려) (with Juniel)	2013	27	52	KOR (DL): 112,735	Romantic J: Winter Special Digital Single Album
"Young Love" (사실은 말야) (with Melody Day)	2014	76	—	KOR (DL): 52,666	Non-album single
"—" denotes releases that did not chart or were not released in that region. Note – Billboard K-Pop Hot 100 Chart was established in August 2011. Releases before this date have no chart data.

=== Video albums ===
Title	Album details	Peak chart positions		Sales
Title	Album details	JPN DVD	JPN Blu-ray	Sales
1st Solo Concert in Japan (Welcome to Sparkling Night): Live at Tokyo International Forum	Released: December 7, 2016; Label: Warner Music Japan; Format: DVD, Blu-ray	13	24	JPN: 3,865

=== Song writing and production credits ===
List of songwriting and production credits for Lee Jong-hyun

Year released	Artist	Title	Album	Role	Notes
2016	CNBLUE	"Be My Love"	Puzzle	Co-composer, Lyricist	
2016	CNBLUE	"The Seasons"	Blueming	Co-composer, Co-lyricist	
2015	Ailee	"Fill Your Glass"	Vivid	Co-composer, Co-lyricist	
2015	CNBLUE	"Footsteps"	2gether	Co-composer, Lyricist, Co-arranger	
2015	CNBLUE	"Drunken night"	2gether	Co-composer, Lyricist	
2015	CNBLUE	"Hero"	2gether	Co-composer, Lyricist	
2015	CNBLUE	"Lucid dream"	colors	Co-composer, Lyricist	
2015	CNBLUE	"Irony"	White, colors	Composer, co-lyricist	
2015	CNBLUE	"White"	White, colors	Co-composer, co-lyricist	
2014	Nam Young-joo	"Fragile and Kind"	Fragile and Kind	Co-composer, co-lyricist	
2014	CNBLUE	"Foxy"	Wave	Co-composer, co-lyricist	
2014	CNBLUE	"Paradise"	Wave	Co-composer, lyricist	
2014	CNBLUE	"How awesome"	Wave	Co-composer, lyricist	
2014	CNBLUE	"Monster"	Go Your Way	Co-composer, lyricist	
2014	CNBLUE	"Heart Song" (English version) / "Footsteps" (Korean version)	Truth (English version) / 2gether (Korean version)	Co-composer, lyricist, co-arranger (Korean version)	
2014	CNBLUE	"Sleepless Night..."	Can't Stop	Co-composer, co-lyricist	
2013	Romantic J (Lee Jong-hyun and Juniel)	"Love Falls"	Love Falls (Digital Single Release)	Co-composer	
2013	CNBLUE	"I Can't Believe"	What Turns You On? (English version), Present (Korean version)	Co-composer, lyricist (English version) / Co-lyricist (Korean version)	
2013	CNBLUE	"Crying Out"	What Turns You On?	Co-composer, lyricist	
2013	CNBLUE	"With Your Eyes"	Blind Love, What Turns You On?	Composer, lyricist	Charted at #3 (Japan Recochoku K-Pop weekly Asia chart)
2013	CNBLUE	"Blind Love"	Blind Love, What Turns You On?(Japanese version), Present (Korean version)	Co-composer, lyricist (Japanese version) / Co-lyricist (Korean version), co-arranger	Charted at #1 (Japan Recochoku K-Pop weekly Asia chart), #4 (Japan Oricon), #7 (Japan Billboard Hot 100), #4 (Japan Billboard Hot Single Sales)
2013	CNBLUE	""Na Geudaeboda" (나 그대보다; "Myself More Than You")"	Re:Blue	Co-composer	Charted at #41 (Korea Gaon), #48 (Korea Billboard), #6 (Taiwan KK Box)
2012	CNBLUE	"Starlit Night"	Robot, What Turns You On?	Composer, lyricist	
2012	CNBLUE	"These Days"	Code Name Blue	Composer	Unreleased Korean version first performed at Blue Night Concert in Seoul (2012)
2012	CNBLUE	"No More"	Code Name Blue	Co-composer	
2012	CNBLUE	"My Miracle"	Come On, Present	Co-composer	
2012	CNBLUE	"Come On"	Come On, Code Name Blue	Composer	#5 (Japan Oricon), #8 (Japan Billboard Hot 100), #5 (Japan Billboard Hot Single Sales)
2012	CNBLUE	"Get Away"	Where You Are, Code Name Blue	Co-composer	Unreleased Korean version first performed at Blue Night Concert in Seoul (2012)
2011	CNBLUE	"Rain of Blessing"	In My Head	Co-composer	
2011	CNBLUE	"Illusion"	392	Composer, co-lyricist	
2011	CNBLUE	"Coward"	392	Co-composer, co-arranger	
2011	CNBLUE	"Kimio" (Japanese Version)/"Yes" (Korean Version)	392 (Japanese Version), First Step +1 Thank You (Korean Version)	Composer, co-lyricist (Korean Version)	#102 (Korea Gaon) (Korean Version)
2011	CNBLUE	"Wanna Be Like You" (Korean Version)	First Step (Korean Version)	Co-lyricist (Korean Version)	Charted at #73 (Korea Gaon) (Korean Version)
2011	CNBLUE	"Lie"	392 (Japanese Version), First Step (Korean Version)	Co-composer	Charted at #52 (Korea Gaon) (Korean Version)
2011	CNBLUE	"Eclipse" (Japanese Version)/ "Love Follows the Rain" (Korean Version)	(previously released in single "The Way" in 2010 as Part 3), 392 (Japanese Version), First Step (Korean Version)	Co-composer	Charted at #39 (Korea Gaon) (Korean Version)
2011	CNBLUE	"A.Ri.Ga.Tou" (Japanese Version) / "Thank You" (고마워요) (Korean Version)	Thank U (Japanese Version), First Step (Korean Version)	Composer, co-lyricist (Korean Version)	Charted at #69 (Korea Gaon) (Korean Version)
2009	CNBLUE	"Never Too Late"	Voice, Thank U	Co-composer	

== Awards and nominations ==
Year	Award	Category	Nominated work	Result	Ref
2012	5th Korea Drama Awards	Best OST	"My Love" (A Gentleman's Dignity OST)	Nominated	
2012	14th Mnet Asian Music Awards	Best OST	"My Love" (A Gentleman's Dignity OST)	Nominated	
2012	4th MelOn Music Awards	TStore Best Song	"My Love" (A Gentleman's Dignity OST)	Nominated	
2012	4th MelOn Music Awards	Best OST	"My Love" (A Gentleman's Dignity OST)	Nominated	
2012	SBS Drama Awards	New Star Award	A Gentleman's Dignity	Won	
2013	22nd Seoul Music Awards	Best OST	"My Love" (A Gentleman's Dignity OST)	Won	
