= In My Head (CNBLUE song) =

- Regular edition cover

Single by CN Blue

from the album Code Name Blue
- B-side: "Mr. KIA (Know It All)"; "Rain of Blessing"
- Released: October 19, 2011
- Recorded: 2011
- Genre: Rock
- Length: 4:14
- Label: Warner Music Japan
- Songwriters: Kenji Tamai, Yoshifumi Kanamaru
- Producer: Jung Yong-hwa

CN Blue Japanese singles chronology
"Re-Maintenance" (2011)	"In My Head" (2011)	"Where You Are" (2012)

"In My Head" is a song by the South Korean rock band CN Blue. It is their major debut single in Japan under Warner Music Japan and fourth single overall. The song was written by Kenji Tamai and Yoshifumi Kanamaru and composed by Jung Yong-hwa. It was released on October 19, 2011 in 3 different editions: CD+DVD, Regular edition and Lawson store limited edition. A Korean version of the song was released on the group's third mini-album Ear Fun.

== Composition ==
"In My Head" was written by Kenji Tamai and Yoshifumi Kanamaru and composed by Jung Yong-hwa. "Mr. KIA (Know It All)" was written and composed by Jung Yong Hwa and Ryo. "Rain of Blessing" was written by Kenji Tamai, Kaori Fukano and Keisuke and composed by Lee Jong-hyun and Ryo.

== Promotions ==
To promote the single, the band performed in the TV shows Music Japan and Music Fair on October 22. They promoted the song in South Korea in a special Korean version of the song in KBS's Music Bank Year-End special and MBC's Gayo Daejun. The song was chosen to be the ending theme song of Supernatural: The Animation, an animated version of the TV series Supernatural.

== Music video ==
A 30-seconds version of the music video was released in September 22, 2011 and the full music video released on September 26, 2011 on the music channel Space Shower TV. Warner Music Japan uploaded the video on YouTube on October 31.

== Track listing ==
All editions:
No.	Title	Lyrics	Music	Arrangement	Length
1.	"In My Head"	Kenji Tamai, Yoshifumi Kanamaru	Jung Yong-hwa	Kenji Tamai, Rui Momota	4:14
2.	"Mr. KIA (Know It All)"	Jung Yong-hwa	Jung Yong-hwa, Ryo	Kenji Tamai, Kousuke Noma	3:33
3.	"Rain of Blessing"	Kenji Tamai, Kaori Fukano, Keisuke	Lee Jong-hyun, Ryo	Kenji Tamai, Shunsuke Tsuri	4:13
4.	"In My Head" (Instrumental)		Jung Yong-hwa	Kenji Tamai, Rui Momota	4:14
Total length:					16:12

DVD
No.	Title	Length
1.	"In My Head" (Music video)
2.	"In My Head" (Music video - Special footage)

Note

- The iTunes version of the single does not include the Instrumental.

== Chart performance ==
The single debuted at number 3 in Oricon's Daily chart and climbed to number 2 two days after. It debuted at number 4 in Oricon's Weekly chart with 71,200 copies sold on the first week, only behind to Kara's "Winter Magic", Bump of Chicken's "Zero" and NMB48's "Oh My God!". The single peaked number 96 in 2011's Oricon Yearly chart. In the end of October, the single got certified Gold by RIAJ for sold 100,000 copies of the physical single.

=== Charts ===
==== Oricon ====
Released	Oricon Chart	Peak	Debut Sales	Sales Total	Chart Run
October 19, 2011	Daily Singles Chart	2	34,280 (daily); 71,200 (weekly)	83,351+	13 weeks
October 19, 2011	Weekly Singles Chart	4	34,280 (daily); 71,200 (weekly)	83,351+	13 weeks
October 19, 2011	Monthly Singles Chart	6	34,280 (daily); 71,200 (weekly)	83,351+	13 weeks

=== Other charts ===
Chart	Peak position
Billboard Japan Hot 100	4
RIAJ Digital Track Chart weekly top 100	28
Gaon International weekly albums chart	16

=== Year-end charts ===
Chart (2011)	Position
Oricon Yearly singles	96

=== Sales and certifications ===
Chart	Amount
RIAJ physical single	Gold (100,000+)

== Release history ==
Country	Date	Format	Label
Japan	October 19, 2011	CD single, Digital download	Warner Music Japan
