= Kang Min-hyuk =

South Korean musician (born 1991)

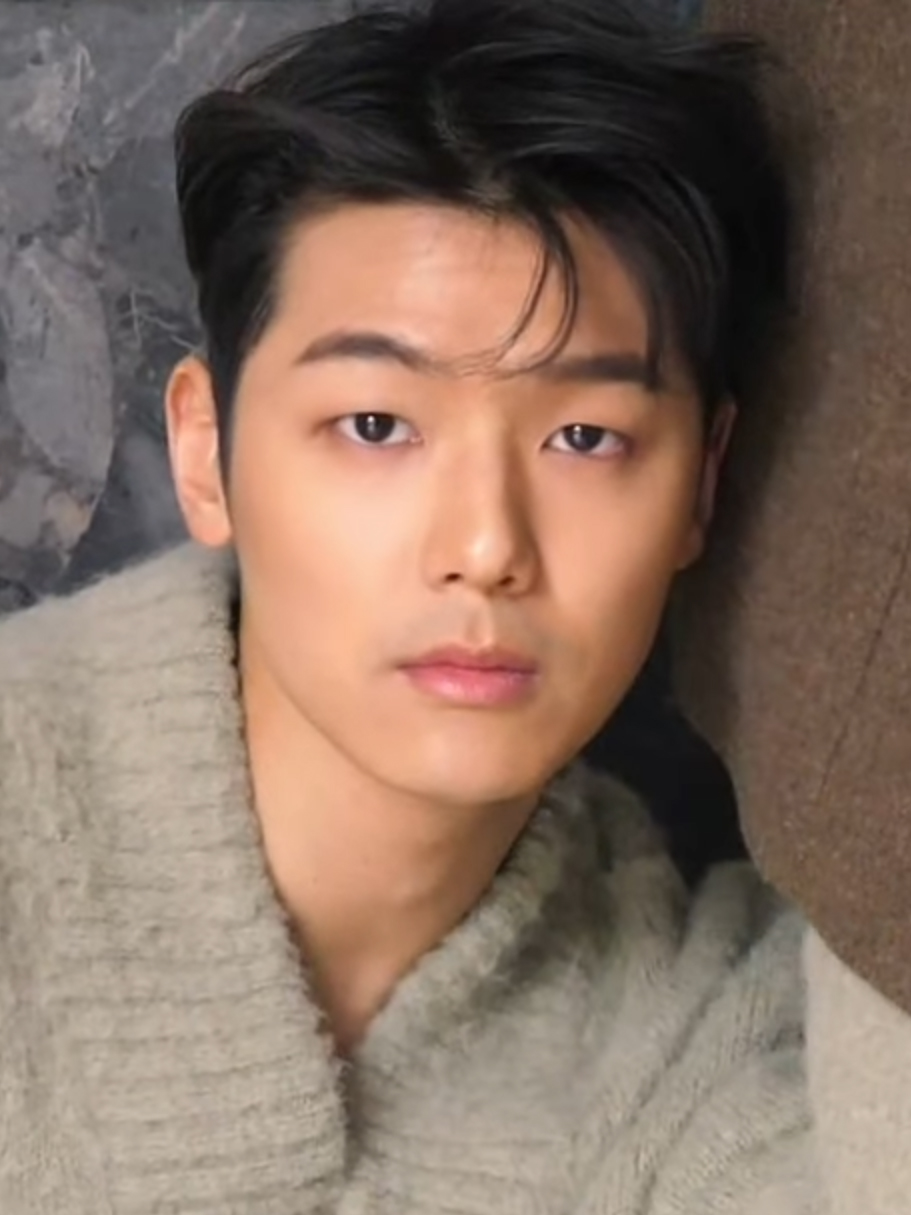
- Kang in 2020
- Born: June 28, 1991 (age 35); Ilsan-gu, Goyang, South Korea
- Education: Digital Seoul Culture Arts University
- Occupations: Singer; songwriter; drummer; actor
- Musical career
- Genres: Rock; R&B; pop
- Instrument: Drums
- Years active: 2009–present
- Label: FNC
- Member of: CNBLUE
- Website: fncent.com

Korean name
- Hangul: 강민혁
- Hanja: 姜敏赫
- RR: Gang Minhyeok
- MR: Kang Minhyŏk

Kang Min-hyuk (Korean: 강민혁; born June 28, 1991), also known mononymously as Minhyuk, is a South Korean musician, singer-songwriter, and actor. He is the drummer of South Korean rock band CNBLUE.

== Career ==
=== 2009–present: CNBLUE ===
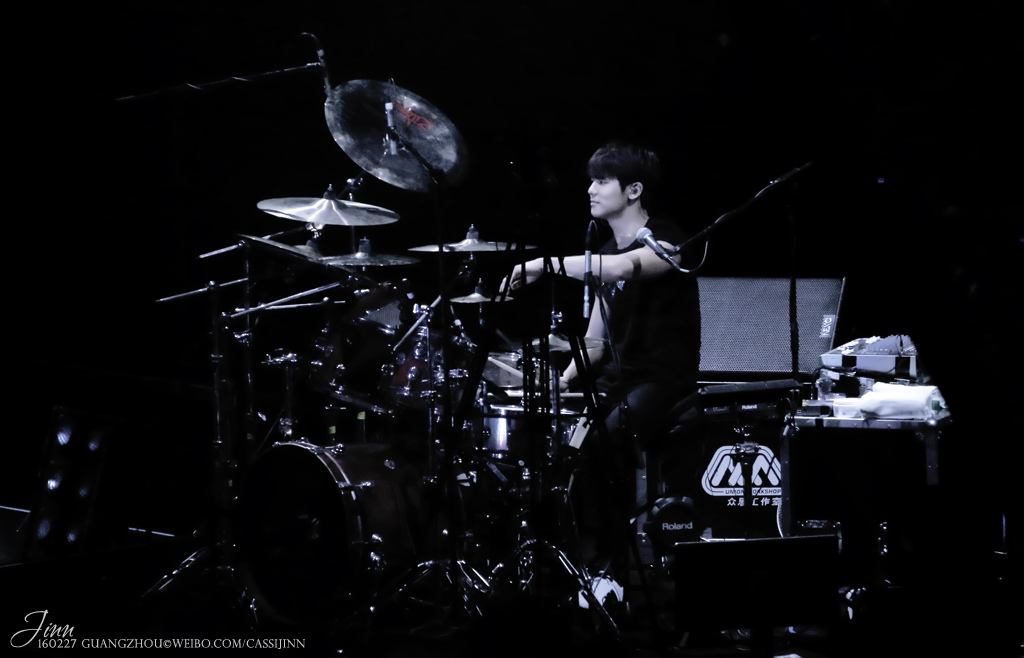
Kang performing in Guangzhou, 2016

Kang became a member of CNBLUE in 2009. The group debuted in Japan with the mini album Now or Never on August 19, 2009, with an indie label AI Entertainment. They officially debuted in Korea in 2010 with the mini album Bluetory, and the title track "I'm a Loner" became an instant hit in Korea.

=== 2010–present: Acting roles and solo activities ===
In 2010, Kang began his acting career in an omnibus film Acoustic alongside his fellow CNBLUE member Lee Jong-hyun. He then made his small-screen debut in the SBS drama It's Okay, Daddy's Girl.

In 2011, he was cast in MBC's youth melodrama Heartstrings, which stars fellow CNBLUE member Jung Yong-hwa. He sang an OST for the drama, titled "Star".

In 2012, he starred in KBS's weekend family drama My Husband Got a Family, and gained recognition for his role as a playboy. The series topped the weekly ratings chart for 25 consecutive weeks and reached a ratings peak of 45.8 percent (TNmS) and 52.3 percent (AGB Nielsen), making it the highest rated Korean drama in 2012.

Kang continued to gain more popularity after starring in The Heirs (2013), a teen drama penned by Kim Eun-sook. Along with his co-star Krystal Jung, they were voted as the Best Onscreen Couple at the 2013 DramaFever Awards.

In 2015, Kang became a fixed cast of KBS's reality-variety show Brave Family, and became a host of JTBC's show Mum is Watching. After a three-year hiatus, Kang made his television comeback in SBS's musical drama Entertainer in 2016, for which he won an Excellence Award at the SBS Drama Awards. The same year, he became a host of KBS's live music show Music Bank with Laboum's Solbin from July 2016 to November 2016.

In 2017, Kang was cast in his first lead role, playing a doctor in MBC's medical drama Hospital Ship. In 2018, Kang had a supporting role in the period comedy film, The Princess and the Matchmaker. The film was shot back in 2015. In 2019, Kang released two Japanese singles, Moontalk and On the Cheek, on January 7 and February 14, respectively. He dropped the album containing these two singles along with three more Japanese tracks on March 13.

Following his discharge from the military in early 2020, Kang made his acting comeback in a romantic comedy-drama, How to Be Thirty. The streaming television series premiered on KakaoTV in February 2021. In March 2021, Kang starred in MBC's romantic comedy series, Oh My Ladylord. In October 2021, Kang announced his own YouTube channel, 만취민혁 Hobby Binger. On March 25, 2022, Kang made his debut as a writer in the MD book Not Everything, and an exhibition of books will be held together. This MD includes mugs, coasters, blankets, and punctuation stickers.

== Personal life ==
=== Military service ===
Kang enlisted in his military service on July 31, 2018. During his service he served in the 55th Division Yongin, Gyeonggi Province. Kang has been discharged as of March 19, 2020, without returning to his base from his ETS leave according to the Ministry of National Defense's policy.

== Philanthropy ==
On April 6, 2019, it was reported that Kang donated 10 million won to the victims of forest fires in Goseong County and Sokcho in Gangwon Province. According to Hope Bridge National Disaster Relief Association, the donation will be used for the recovery of damaged areas.

== Filmography ==
=== Film ===
Year	Title	Role	Notes	Ref.
2010	Acoustic	Kim Hae-won	segment: Bakery Attack	
2017	I Am a Cat	Narrator		
2018	The Princess and the Matchmaker	Kang Hwi		
2023	Havana	Lee Jung-min		

=== Television series ===
Year	Title	Role	Notes	Ref.
2010	It's Okay, Daddy's Girl	Hwang Yun-doo		
2011	Heartstrings	Yeo Joon-hee		
2012	My Husband Got a Family	Cha Se-gwang		
2013	The Heirs	Yoon Chan-young		
2016	Entertainer	Jo Ha-neul		
2017	School 2017	Jong-geun	Cameo (episode 1)	
2017	Hospital Ship	Kwak Hyun		
2021	Oh My Ladylord	Yoo Jin		
2023	Celebrity	Han Jun Gyeong		

=== Web series ===
Year	Title	Role	Ref.
2021	How to Be Thirty	Lee Seung-yoo	

=== Television shows ===
Year	Title	Role	Notes	Ref.
2015	Brave Family	Fixed cast		
2015	Our Neighborhood Arts and Physical Education	Regular cast	swimming segment	
2015	I Live Alone	Regular cast		
2022	Golf Battle: Birdie Buddies	Contestant	Season 4	
2022	Buddy Boys	Cast Member		

=== Hosting ===
Year	Title	Notes	Ref.
2010	M Countdown	Rotating host; with Nichkhun, Lee Jun-ho, Hwang Chan-sung, Jo Kwon, Jeong Jin-woon, Lee Joon, and G.O	
2014	2014 K-Pop World Festival in Changwon	with Jung Eun-ji	
2015	Mom is Watching		
2016	Music Bank	with Solbin	

== Discography ==
=== Singles ===
Title	Year	Peak positions	Album
Title	Year	KOR Gaon	Album
"High Fly" (with Lee Jong-hyun)	2010	102	Acoustic OST
"Star"	2011	66	Heartstrings OST
"I See You"	2016	–	Entertainer OST
"Moontalk"	2019	–	"On the Cheek" Japanese Single
"On the Cheek"	2019	–	"On the Cheek" Japanese Single

== Awards and nominations ==
Name of the award ceremony, year presented, category, nominee of the award, and the result of the nomination
Award ceremony	Year	Category	Nominee / Work	Result	Ref.
APAN Star Awards	2012	Rising Star Award	My Husband Got a Family	Won	
APAN Star Awards	2016	Best New Actor	Entertainer	Nominated	
Baeksang Arts Awards	2014	Most Popular Actor (TV)	The Heirs	Nominated	
DramaFever Awards	2014	Best Couple	Kang Min-hyuk with Krystal Jung; The Heirs	Won	
KBS Drama Awards	2012	Best New Actor	My Husband Got a Family	Nominated	
Korean Culture & Entertainment Awards	2012	Best New Actor (TV)	My Husband Got a Family	Nominated	
Korea Drama Awards	2012	Best New Actor	My Husband Got a Family	Nominated	
MBC Drama Awards	2017	Excellence Award, Actor in a Miniseries	Hospital Ship	Nominated	
MBC Drama Awards	2017	Popularity Award, Actor	Hospital Ship	Nominated	
MBC Drama Awards	2021	Excellence Award, Actor in a Miniseries	Oh My Ladylord	Nominated	
SBS Drama Awards	2013	New Star Award	The Heirs	Won	
SBS Drama Awards	2016	Excellence Award, Actor in a Romantic Comedy Drama	Entertainer	Won	
