= Jung Yong-hwa discography =

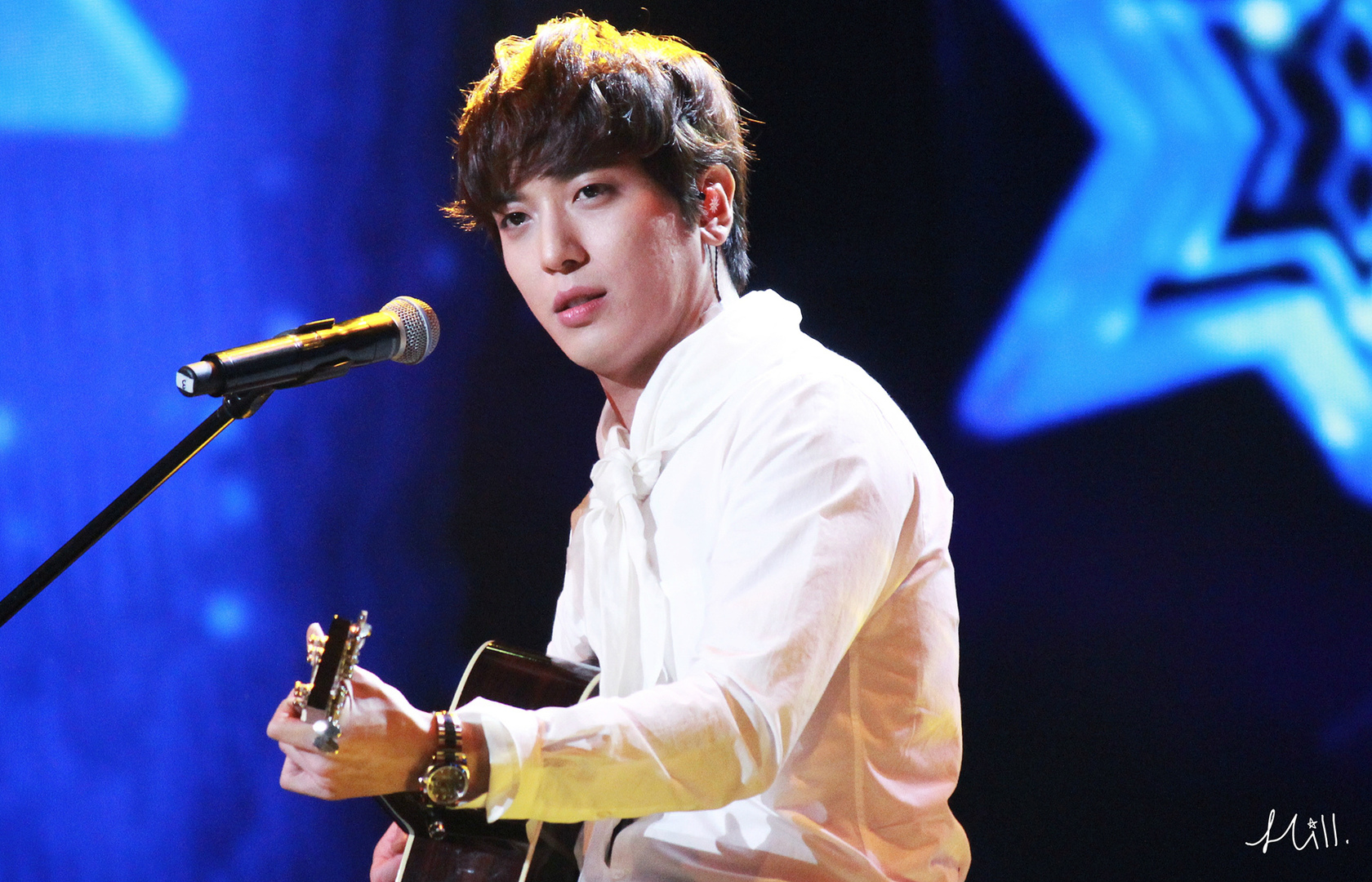
- Jung Yong-hwa at the 2015 Top Chinese Music Awards
- Studio albums: 3
- EPs: 4
- Live albums: 2
- Soundtrack appearances: 5

The discography of the South Korean singer Jung Yong-hwa consists of three studio albums, two live albums, four extended plays, five soundtrack appearances, and multiple singles.

== Albums ==
=== Studio albums ===
Title	Album details	Peak chart positions			Sales
Title	Album details	KOR	JPN	US World	Sales
One Fine Day	Released: January 20, 2015 (KOR); Label: FNC Entertainment; Formats: CD, digital download	1	4	1	KOR: 118,047; JPN: 24,854
Summer Calling	Released: August 9, 2017 (JPN); Label: Warner Music Japan; Formats: CD, digital download	—	3	—	JPN: 23,131
Feel the Y's City	Released: February 26, 2020 (JPN); Label: Warner Music Japan; Formats: CD, digital download	—	4	—	JPN: 16,534
"—" denotes releases that did not chart or were not released in that region.

=== Live albums ===
Title	Album details	Peak chart positions
Title	Album details	JPN
One Fine Day Live at Budokan	Released: June 24, 2015 (JPN); Label: Warner Music Japan; Formats: CD, digital download	18
Summer Calling Live at World Hall in Kobe	Released: February 28, 2018 (JPN); Label: Warner Music Japan; Formats: CD, digital download	13

== Extended plays ==
Title	EP details	Peak chart positions			Sales
Title	EP details	KOR	JPN	US World	Sales
Do Disturb	Released: July 19, 2017 (KOR); Label: FNC Entertainment; Formats: CD, digital download	3	27	12	KOR: 65,771; JPN: 4,452
Stay in Touch (和.唱)	Released: June 22, 2021 (TWN); Label: Warner Music Taiwan; Formats: CD, digital download	—	—	—	
Your City	Released: September 14, 2023; Label: FNC, Kakao; Formats: CD, digital download	8	47	—	KOR: 50,297; JPN: 768
One Last Day	Released: July 3, 2025; Label: FNC, Kakao; Formats: CD, LP, digital download	7	6	—	KOR: 60,340; JPN: 9,666
"—" denotes releases that did not chart or were not released in that region.

== Singles ==
=== As lead artist ===
Title	Year	Peak chart positions		Sales	Album
Title	Year	KOR	JPN Hot	Sales	Album
Korean
"For First Time Lovers"	2011	1	—	KOR: 1,561,869	Non-album singles
"You, My Star"	2014	22	—	KOR: 73,332	Non-album singles
"Mileage" (with YDG)	2015	57	—	KOR: 78,506	One Fine Day
"One Fine Day"	2015	3	—	KOR: 313,491	One Fine Day
"Hello" (with Sunwoo Jung-a)	2016	45	—	KOR: 81,049	Empathy
"Fireworks" (with Sunwoo Jung-a)	2016	—	—	KOR: 16,283	Empathy
"That Girl" (feat. Loco)	2017	77	—	KOR: 26,909	Do Disturb
"Would You Marry Me?" (너,나,우리) (feat. Lee Joon, Yoon Doo-joon, and Kwanghee)	2020	168	—		Non-album single
"Your City"	2023	—	—		Your City
"Night Summer (Shooting Star)"	2025	—	—		One Last Day
Japanese
"Brothers"	2018	—	—		Feel the Y's City
"Letter"	2018	—	54		Feel the Y's City
"Melody"	2019	—	—		Feel the Y's City
"Jellyfish"	2019	—	—		Feel the Y's City
"The Moment"	2019	—	—		Feel the Y's City
Mandarin
"Checkmate (R3HAB Remix)" (with JJ Lin)	2021	—	—		Stay In Touch
"10,000 Hours (Global Chinese Version)"	2021	—	—		Stay In Touch
"Nonsense" (禁愛條款) (with Jam Hsiao)	2021	—	—		Stay In Touch
"—" denotes releases that did not chart or were not released in that region.

=== As featured artist ===
Title	Year	Peak chart positions	Sales	Album
Title	Year	KOR	Sales	Album
"Home Alone" (Ravi feat. Jung Yong-hwa)	2017	83	KOR: 19,987	R.eal1ze
"Some 2" (Soyou feat. Jung Yong-hwa)	2022	—	—N/a	Day & Night

=== Soundtrack appearances ===
Title	Year	Peak chart positions	Sales	Album
Title	Year	KOR	Sales	Album
"Promise" (Lee Hong-gi feat. Jung Yong-hwa)	2009	—		You're Beautiful OST
"You've Fallen for Me" (넌 내게 반했어)	2011	5	KOR: 1,615,795	Heartstrings OST
"Because I Miss You" (그리워서)	2011	14	KOR: 999,707	Heartstrings OST
"Shall We Kiss?" (키스해볼까?)	2020	—		The Spies Who Loved Me OST
"I Got Ya"	2021	—		Sell Your Haunted House OST
"—" denotes releases that did not chart or were not released in that region.

== See also ==
- CNBLUE discography
- List of songs written and produced by Jung Yong-hwa
