= One Fine Day =

One Fine Day may refer to:

== Film and television ==
- One Fine Day (1968 film), an Italian drama
- One Fine Day, a 1979 British television film directed by Stephen Frears
- One Fine Day (1996 film), an American romantic comedy-drama
- One Fine Day (South Korean TV series), a 2006 drama series
- One Fine Day (American TV series), a 2007–2008 American Internet Protocol television series

== Music ==
=== Performers ===
- One Fine Day (band), a German rock band

=== Albums ===
- One Fine Day (Chris Rea album) or the title song, 2019
- One Fine Day (Katherine Jenkins album), 2011
- One Fine Day (Jung Yong-hwa album) or the title song (see below), 2015
- One Fine Day, by Tomomi Kahara
- One Fine Day, an EP by K.Will

=== Songs ===
- "One Fine Day" (song), written by Gerry Goffin and Carole King; popularized by the Chiffons (1963), covered by King (1980) and many others
- "One Fine Day" (Jung Yong-hwa song), 2015
- "One Fine Day", by Camouflage from Methods of Silence, 1989
- "One Fine Day", by David Byrne and Brian Eno from Everything That Happens Will Happen Today, 2008
- "One Fine Day", by Hayley Westenra from Treasure, 2007
- "One Fine Day", by Jakatta (Dave Lee), 2002
- "One Fine Day", by Marillion from This Strange Engine, 1997
- "One Fine Day", by the Offspring from Conspiracy of One, 2000
- ”One Fine Day”, by Robbie Williams, B-side to "Come Undone", 2003
- "One Fine Day", by Sector 27, 1980
- "One Fine Day", by Sting from 57th & 9th, 2016

== Other media ==
- One Fine Day, a 1947 novel by Mollie Panter-Downes
- One Fine Day (book), a 1971 children's book by Nonny Hogrogian
- One Fine Day, a South Korean radio program presented by Lena Park

== See also ==
- "Un bel dì, vedremo" ("One fine day we will see"), an aria from Puccini's opera Madama Butterfly
