= Mileage =

Mileage is a distance measured in miles.

== Motor vehicles ==
- Distance traveled, typically as measured by an odometer, optionally from a milestone (UK)
- Fuel economy in automobiles, typically in miles per gallon (mpg) (US) or liters per 100 kilometers (l/100 km)
- Business mileage reimbursement rate, an optional standard mileage rate used in the United States for purposes of computing the allowable business deduction

== Other uses ==
- "Mileage" (song), by Jung Yong-hwa and YDG, 2015
- Loyalty programs frequently list their points as "mileage" or "miles", earning their origins from airlines' frequent-flyer programs
- Mileage, a song on Die Lit by Playboi Carti.
