= Empathy (singles) =

2016 single by Jung Yong-hwa

- "Hello" cover. The "Fireworks" cover shows Jung and Sunwoo in inverse positions.

Single by Jung Yong-hwa and Sunwoo Jung-a
- Released: January 15, 2016
- Recorded: 2015–16
- Length: 3:32
- Label: FNC Entertainment
- Songwriters: Jung Yong-hwa; Sunwoo Jung-a
- Producer: Jung Yong-hwa

Jung Yong-hwa singles chronology
"One Fine Day" (2015)	"Empathy" (2016)	"Empathy" (2016)

"Empathy"

Single by Sunwoo Jung-a and Jung Yong-hwa
- Released: January 15, 2016
- Recorded: 2015–16
- Genre: Dance-pop
- Length: 4:25
- Label: MagicStrawberry Sound
- Songwriters: Sunwoo Jung-a; Jung Yong-hwa
- Producer: Sunwoo Jung-a

Sunwoo Jung-a singles chronology
"Empathy" (2016)	"Empathy" (2016)

"Empathy" (교감; "Gyogam") is a pair of collaboration singles between South Korean musicians Jung Yong-hwa of CNBLUE and Sunwoo Jung-a. Consisting of the songs "Hello" (입김; "Ipgim"; lit. "Breath") and "Fireworks" (불꽃놀이; "Bulkkonnori"), they were released on January 15, 2016, under FNC Entertainment and MagicStrawberry Sound, respectively. After the two independently wrote incomplete lyrics to separate songs with each other in mind, Jung reached out to Sunwoo for a collaboration. Deemed as "fate", Sunwoo accepted and the two agreed upon a "double collaboration".

An acoustic ballad and dance-pop number, respectively, "Hello" and "Fireworks" both revolve around the theme of love. The songs received generally favorable reviews from music critics, who commended the vocal performance by Jung and Sunwoo. "Hello" peaked at number 45 on the Gaon Digital Chart; "Fireworks" failed to rank on that chart, but peaked at number 86 on the Download Chart.

== Background and recording ==
Jung revealed his desire to work with Sunwoo shortly after releasing of his first solo album One Fine Day (2015). Collaborating only with men for the album, he expressed his desire to work with female musicians. He felt that the two could collaborate on a song in the tempo of allegretto. Initially, Sunwoo believed that Jung was just a "vocalist of an idol band". After listening to his album, she became aware of his abilities as a singer-songwriter.

"Empathy" was conceived as a result of the inspiration Jung and Sunwoo invoked between each other. Prior to meeting her, he wrote incomplete lyrics to "Hello" with her in mind. Also conveying the sentiment of wanting to participate in a song with Jung, Sunwoo wrote incomplete lyrics for "Fireworks". Within a month, she was called upon to collaborate with Jung, in which she deemed as "fate". The two agreed on a "double collaboration".

Jung and Sunwoo met in Hongdae, Seoul, at Sunwoo's record company MagicStrawberry Sound. They exchanged the lyrics they had written and proceeded in finalizing the songs. On writing "Hello", the two determined that it must be a "warm" track. Once agreeing on the theme and word choice for the song, the two first completed writing and recording the song. "Fireworks" was completed after Jung finished the composition and recording the bridge of the track on an electronic keyboard. He also provided guitar for both songs.

== Composition ==
"Hello" is an acoustic ballad that "calmly portrays a moment in past love". The song was written by Jung and Sunwoo, and composed by the former. The song is set in the keys of G–D using compound time with a tempo of 42 beats per minute. The lyrics showcase the separate experiences of two people which share no direction relation between each other. "Fireworks", a metaphor for "passion and beautiful love", is a dance-pop song.

== Release and promotion ==
The release of "Empathy" was first announced on January 11, 2016. On the following day, a video teaser for the collaboration was released. This was followed by the release of the dual cover art for each song. Music video teasers for "Hello" and "Fireworks" were released on January 14, followed by the simultaneous release of the full videos the day after. Jung and Sunwoo were guests on KBS2's talk show You Hee-yeol's Sketchbook, where they performed the songs.

== Critical reception ==
"Empathy" received generally favorable reviews from music critics. Writing for 10asia, Lee Eun-ho praised Sunwoo's vocal delivery in "Hello". He felt that she "compacts the entire emotion of the song and immerses the listeners", which is sustained by Jung's "solid melody". Lee expressed his desire for the song's peak to have a "less obscure flow", but settled that "it's definitely a melody that readily clings to your ears". Rating the songs three out of five stars, Kim Ban-ya of online magazine IZM felt that "Hello" did not "dramatically deviate" from a "typical" ballad, but commended Jung's "masterful and captivating" vocals in "Fireworks". Han Dong-yun of online music store Melon felt that Sunwoo's "wistful tone" and Jung's "lucid and straight" singing in "Fireworks" allowed them to "gently harmonize", which contributed to "appropriate levels of moisture and warmth to the song".

== Commercial performance ==
From the chart dated January 10–16, 2016, "Hello" debuted at number 61 on the Gaon Digital Chart, selling 32,636 downloads in its first week. "Fireworks" charted at number 86 on the Gaon Download Chart, selling 16,283 downloads in its first week. On its second week, "Hello" rose 16 ranks to number 45, selling an additional 33,148 downloads and accumulating 793,217 streams.

== Charts ==
Chart (2016)	Song	Peak position
Gaon Digital Chart	"Hello"	45
Gaon Download Chart	"Fireworks"	86
