= Mileage (song) =

Single by Jung Yong-hwa with YDG

from the album One Fine Day
- Released: January 9, 2015
- Recorded: 2014
- Length: 4:03
- Label: FNC Entertainment
- Songwriters: Jung Yong-hwa, YDG

Jung Yong-hwa singles chronology
"You, My Star" (2014)	"Mileage" (2015)	"One Fine Day" (2015)

"Mileage" (마일리지; Mailliji) is a song by South Korean musicians Jung Yong-hwa of CNBLUE and Yang Dong-geun (YDG). Released on January 9, 2015, it serves as the pre-release single of the former's debut solo studio album One Fine Day (2015). While filming the television series The Three Musketeers (2014), Jung was inspired by YDG's affection towards his family on set to compose the song. Upon release of Jung's album, the two performed "Mileage" on music programs and talk shows. The song debuted and peaked at number 57 on South Korea's national Gaon Digital Chart, selling over 78,000 digital downloads since its release.

== Background and composition ==
In May 2014, Jung was in talks to take part in TVN's television series The Three Musketeers. He was officially cast the following month and would star alongside actors Lee Jin-wook and Yang Dong-geun. As recording for the series took place, Yang conveyed endearment to his family on set; Jung took this as inspiration to write the melody for "Mileage". After listening to the track, Yang immediately wrote his rap. He stated that "it formed connections in my head right away", further expressing that Jung was a "musician who has overcome genres".

"Mileage" was written and composed by Jung; YDG contributed the lyrics of his rap. The song is composed in the key of E major using common time with a tempo of 90 beats per minute.

== Release and promotion ==
On January 6, 2015, FNC Entertainment's homepage was redesigned into a teaser website for One Fine Day. The following day, it was revealed that Jung had collaborated with YDG on the track "Mileage". It serves as a pre-release single to the album. One day prior to its release, a music video teaser for "Mileage" was revealed; the full version was uploaded on January 9. It features the duo dressed in hip hop apparel with "cartoon-esque" imagery, along with "comical, straight-faced acting".

Jung performed "Mileage" alongside YDG on Seoul Broadcasting System's (SBS) music show Inkigayo, as well as on the January 30 broadcast of KBS2's talk show You Hee-yeol's Sketchbook. Jung also performed the song the January 15, 2016 broadcast in midst of promoting "Empathy" with Sunwoo Jung-a; the episode was ranked among the top seven performances on the show's history by online music store Melon.

== Critical reception ==
Writing for Ize magazine, music critic Kim Yeong-dae noted how "Mileage" was able to "elegantly advance the recurring thematic progression by controlling the tension through length of notes while minimizing harmonic shifts", which he claimed "attests to the fact that [Jung's] songwriting capability has stepped up to a standard".

An Sang-wook and Yeolshimhi of Y magazine rated the song two out of three stars. Both reviewers noted similarities to Jason Mraz's music, with An particularly highlighting the "groovy" and "simple" instrumentation, which made him feel that it could "pass" as a CNBLUE track. An spoke positively of YDG's rapping, which "complements nicely, functioning to focus the tone of the track". He felt that "Mileage" as a pre-release single was "not a bad choice", but expressed that the song "sticks out" on One Fine Day. Yeolshimhi described the song as "something familiar" which leaves the listener "wanting more of memorable parts or melodies". He stated that, as a composer, Jung was "less inclined to provide entertainment or leave an 'impression'".

== Commercial performance ==
On the chart dated January 4 – 10, 2015, "Mileage" debuted at number 57 on South Korea's national Gaon Digital Chart, selling 27,638 downloads in its first two charting days. The song sold 68,555 downloads throughout January and an additional 9,951 downloads the following month, totaling 78,506 downloads by the end of February.

== Charts ==
Chart (2015)	Peak position
Gaon Digital Chart	57
