= Checkmate (Jung Yong-hwa and JJ Lin song) =

Song by Jung Yong-hwa and JJ Lin

from the album One Fine Day
- Language: Korean; Mandarin; English
- Released: January 20, 2015
- Genre: Rock
- Length: 3:58
- Label: FNC Entertainment
- Songwriters: Jung Yong-hwa, JJ Lin

"Checkmate" is a song by South Korean musician Jung Yong-hwa of CNBLUE and Singaporean singer JJ Lin. A rock song, it is the sixth track on the former's debut solo album One Fine Day, which was released on January 20, 2015. Initially meeting in 2013, the pair decided to collaborate and record a song about mutual support in spite of their national differences.

A collaborative album, JJ Lin was the final musician revealed to have worked with Jung on One Fine Day. Following its release, the duo performed "Checkmate" on Korean Broadcasting System's (KBS) Music Bank on January 23. A music video for "Checkmate" was released a week later.

== Background and composition ==
JJ Lin attended CNBLUE's Blue Moon World Tour (2013) concert in Taiwan, where he first met Jung. They continued to meet at awards ceremonies that both parties attended. Following their initial meeting, Jung began listening to JJ Lin's music and "felt good" about it and sought to collaborate with him. Wanting to work with a foreign musician, Jung decided on JJ Lin to be the first collaboration for his debut solo album One Fine Day. Upon being contacted the following year, Lin agreed to work with him.

"We could be a pawn on the board, repetitively doing the same things for each game on the board. And many times we hope and think whether we can do more than what we were made to do."

— JJ Lin on the song's theme

Jung and JJ Lin wrote the lyrics for "Checkmate" together, but recorded the song independently from one another. The pair communicated via email to complete the song, which was recorded in Taiwan and South Korea. The composition was crafted by Jung, who arranged the song with Lee Sang-ho. According to JJ Lin, the duo wanted to conceive a song which illustrated that "life is often like playing a game of chess". He went on to explain that the track is "about that shout of frustration, and that longing for freedom.". The lyrics convey the idea that "we'd always be there for each other although our nationalities are different". It is a "melodic" rock track with lyrics sung in Korean, Mandarin, and English.

== Release and promotion ==
On January 6, FNC Entertainment's homepage was redesigned into a teaser website for Jung's album. Initiated on the following day, the four artists he collaborated with were revealed on an individual basis. Jung's collaboration with JJ Lin was the final collaboration revealed on January 13. One Fine Day was released on January 20, which includes "Checkmate" as track six. It was later included on the special edition of JJ Lin's album Genesis.

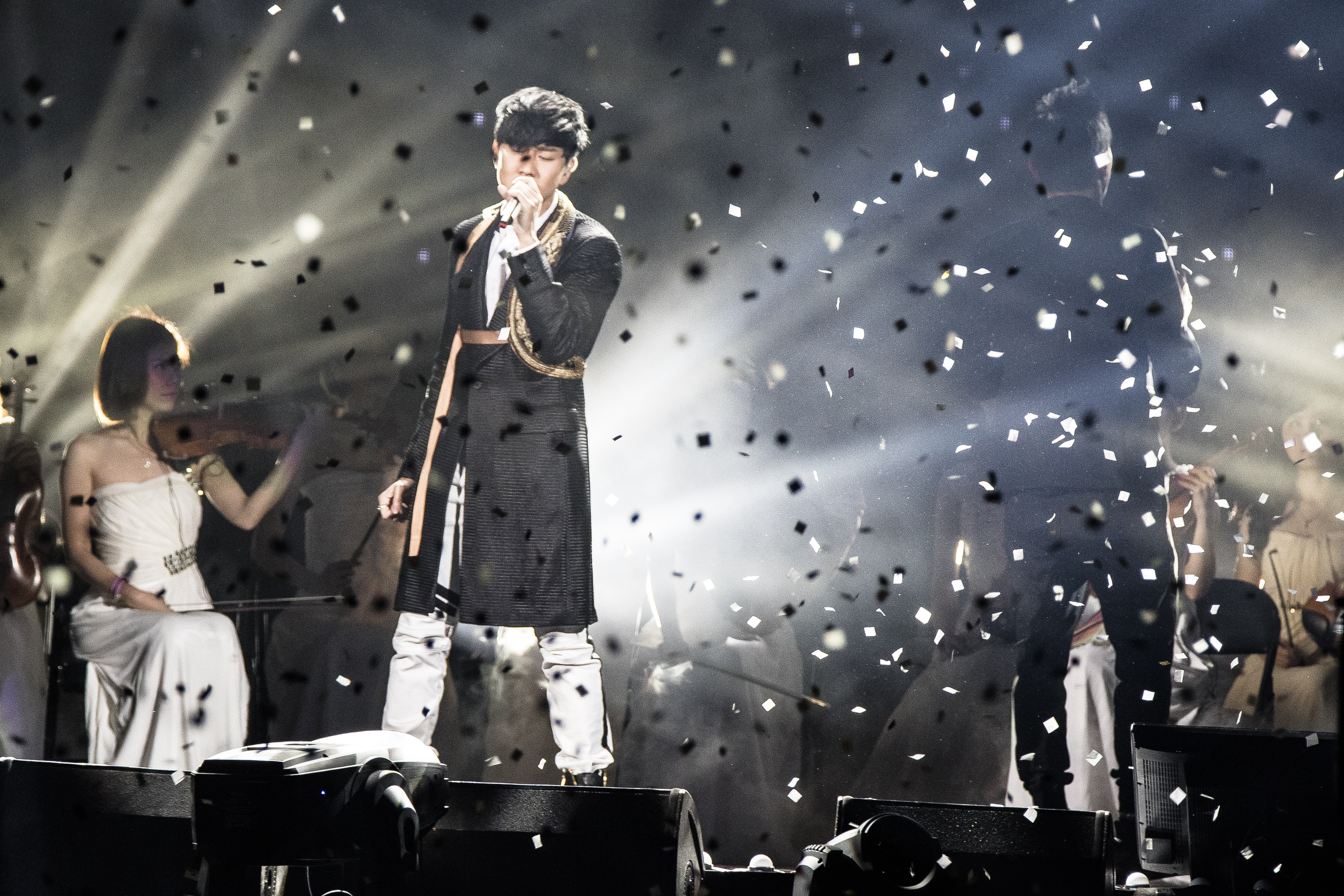
JJ Lin (pictured) performed "Checkmate" with Jung on various occasions

Jung and JJ Lin performed "Checkmate" on KBS's Music Bank on January 23, the latter becoming the first person to perform in Mandarin on the network. Directed by Park Cheol-hwan, the song's accompanying music video was released on January 30. JJ Lin had traveled to Seoul on January 11 to record the video with Jung. Filming lasted 27 hours, and it includes a scene of the two standing atop a 25-story building wearing "thin" suit jackets in temperatures as low as −8 °C (18 °F). The duo portray lethargic salarymen; Jung's character is a recent hire "who questioned the simple works such as telephone answering and copying documents", in contrast to JJ Lin's "veteran employee who forgot the feeling when he had been a novice".

Jung and JJ Lin performed "Checkmate" at the latter's Timeline: New Earth world tour concert in Beijing on May 9. The song was used in the set list of the 2015 Jung Yong-hwa Live "One Fine Day" concert series, his first solo tour. On June 20, during Jung's concert in Taipei, JJ Lin made an unscheduled appearance to celebrate Jung's forthcoming birthday at the time and perform the track alongside him. "Checkmate" was also performed during the Jung Yong-hwa Japan Concert 2017 "Summer Calling" and the 2018 Jung Yong-hwa Live "Room 622" concert tours.

== Charts ==
Chart (2015)	Peak position
Gaon BGM Chart	37
