= For First Time Lovers =

"For First Time Lovers (Banmal Song)"

Single by Jung Yong-hwa
- Released: 14 January 2011
- Recorded: 2011
- Genre: K-pop
- Length: 3:32
- Label: CJ E&M
- Songwriter: Jung Yong-hwa
- Producer: F&C Music

"For First Time Lovers" (Korean: 처음 사랑하는 연인들을 위해, subtitled Banmal Song [반말송]) is Jung Yong-hwa's first solo digital single which was released on 14 January 2011. The song was featured on the second season of We Got Married, where Yonghwa was in a virtual marriage with Girls' Generation's Seohyun, who he wrote the song for.

== Background ==
In an episode of We Got Married where Yonghwa and Girls' Generation's Seohyun were a virtual couple, Yonghwa revealed to his virtual wife that he was working on a song about her. Banmal is the informal form of speech in the Korean language. Seohyun is known to have difficulty dropping honorifics with those who are older than her, and the song is inspired by Yonghwa's desire to hear her speak to him in Banmal.

The song was released as a single on 14 January 2011 and upon its release, topped various South Korean music charts such as Bugs!, Daum, Soribada and Naver Music. The song debuted at #12 on the Gaon Singles Chart, climbing up to the #1 spot in the following week and stayed there for two consecutive weeks.

== Music video ==
In the 64th episode of the second season of We Got Married, the virtual couple, known as YongSeo (a portmanteau of the couple's names), were given a mission to record and upload a music video of the song on YouTube. The two filmed it in the living room of their house in the show, with both of them playing guitars as they performed it. The two would later perform the song as a duet again for the K-pop All Star Live in Niigata concert in August 2011.

== Track listing ==
No.	Title	Lyrics	Music	Arrangement	Length
1.	"For First Time Lovers (Banmal song)"	Jung Yong-hwa, Han Seung-hoon (HOONY)	Jung Yong-hwa	Jung Yong-hwa	3:34
2.	"For First Time Lovers (inst)"		Jung Yong-hwa	Jung Yong-hwa	3:32
Total length:					07:06

- The Banmal Song UCC was chosen as number 4 out of the top 10 UCCs of the first half-year of 2011 by YouTube Korea.

== See also ==
- "I Happen to Love You", a 2009 single by Gain and Jo Kwon featured on We Got Married
- "Nagging", a 2010 single by IU and Lim Seul-ong used as a theme song for We Got Married
