= One Fine Day (Jung Yong-hwa song) =

2015 single by Jung Yong-hwa

Single by Jung Yong-hwa

from the album One Fine Day
- Released: January 20, 2015
- Length: 3:53
- Label: FNC Entertainment
- Songwriters: Jung Yong-hwa, Two Face

Jung Yong-hwa singles chronology
"Mileage" (2015)	"One Fine Day" (2015)	"Aru Suteki na Hi" (2015)

"One Fine Day" (Korean: 어느 멋진 날; RR: Eoneu Meotjin Nal) is a song by South Korean musician Jung Yong-hwa of CNBLUE. It was released on January 20, 2015, as the lead single from his debut solo album of the same name. A breakup ballad, the song's narrator describes the relationship with a former girlfriend and recollects his memories of the time they spent together.

"One Fine Day" and its accompanying music video were simultaneously released. Filmed in Seoul, it was preceded by a teaser four days earlier. Jung performed the song on various weekly music chart shows, which earned him a total of four music show wins, including two consecutive awards on Korean Broadcasting System's (KBS) Music Bank. The song peaked at number three on South Korea's national Gaon Digital Chart and it shifted over 300,000 digital downloads by the end of the year.

== Background and composition ==
"One Fine Day" was written by Jung, who contributed to its composition along with Two Face; the latter arranged the song. The track is a breakup ballad where the narrator recalls his former girlfriend and recollects his memories of their relationship, which he describes as "fine days". The track infuses "string and orchestral elements" in the song previously not found in CNBLUE's music. It is composed in the key of B-flat major using common time with a tempo of 71 beats per minute.

== Release and promotion ==
A music video teaser for "One Fine Day" was uploaded on January 16, 2015. The song was digitally distributed four days later and its music video was concurrently released. Directed by Yong E, the music video was recorded in Seoul in the span of two days. Actress Kim Seo-jin plays Jung's love interest in the video, which was shot in the style of a Korean drama. Filming took place in various locations, including in Noksapyeong station at dawn, Gyeongnidan-gil Road at 8 am, in a shop in Itaewon, and the director's restaurant. The music video captures the onscreen couple out on a date eating fish and chips, Jung at a birthday celebration sporting a white dress shirt while holding champagne, and a somber Jung standing in midst of a dancing crowd at a New Year party. Scenes alternate between the past during the relationship and the present after the breakup contrasted by the use of wide and square screens, respectively.

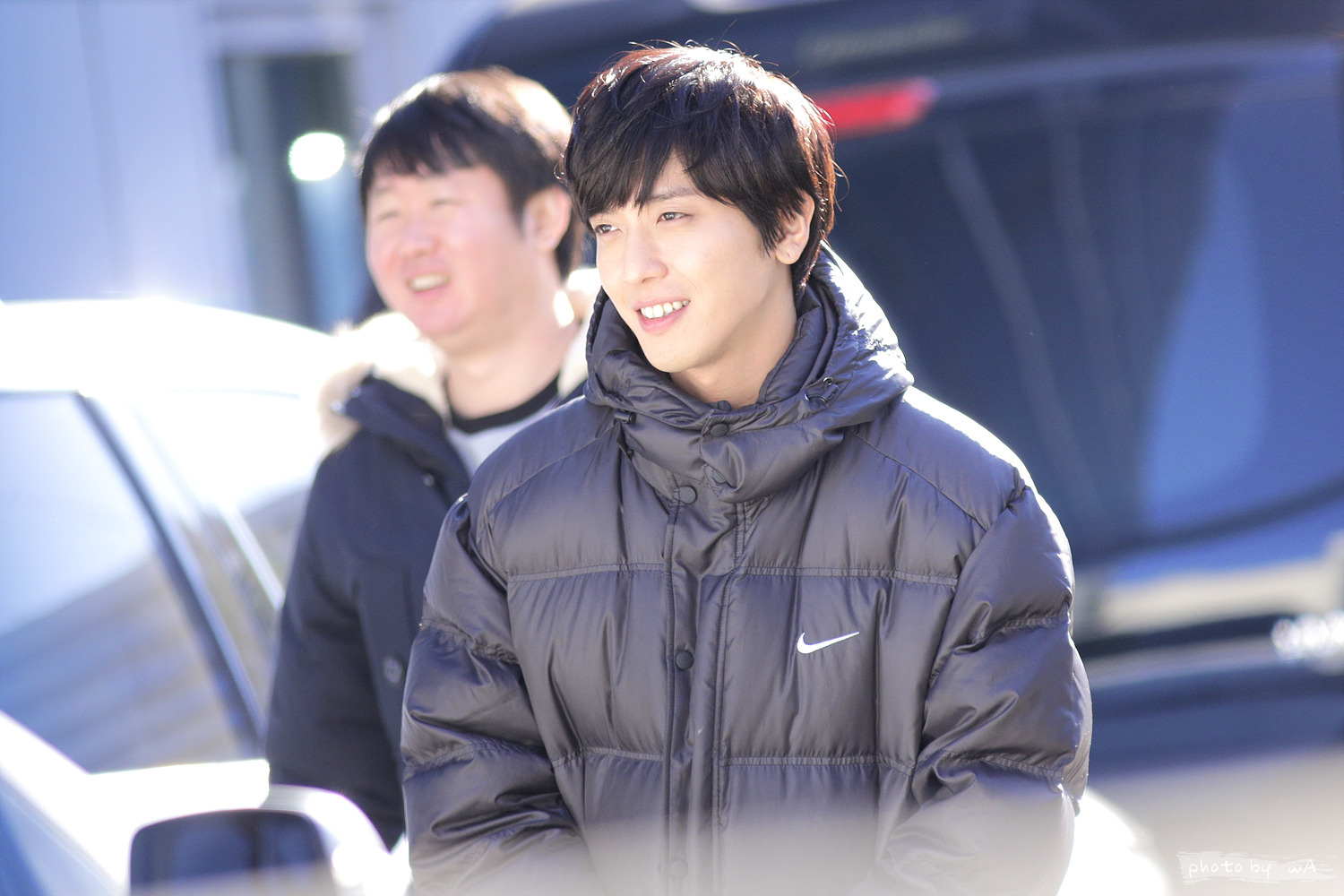
Jung after recording an episode of Inkigayo, February 2015

Jung initiated promotions for "One Fine Day" on January 22 by performing the song on weekly music chart shows. He performed on Mnet's M Countdown, KBS's Music Bank, Munhwa Broadcasting Corporation's (MBC) Show! Music Core, Seoul Broadcasting System's (SBS) Inkigayo, and MBC Music's Show Champion. On the January 30 broadcast of Music Bank, Jung's "One Fine Day" defeated Davichi's "Cry Again" and ranked number one on the program's chart, earning Jung his first music show win two weeks into his solo debut. It was followed by his win on Inkigayo two days later. The song earned Jung his third win that week on Show Champion. He earned a second consecutive and final win on Music Bank the following week, bringing the total of music show wins up to four.

Jung also performed "One Fine Day" on SBS Power FM's radio show Cultwo Show and ArirangTV's Simply K-Pop. He attended the 15th Top Chinese Music Awards in Shenzhen, where he won two awards and performed "One Fine Day". The song was used as the final encore song in the set list of the 2015 Jung Yong-hwa Live "One Fine Day" concert series, his first solo tour. Jung performed "One Fine Day" at the 30th Golden Disc Awards. While promoting Do Disturb (2017), he performed "That Girl" and "One Fine Day" on You Hee-yeol's Sketchbook. The ballad was also performed during the Jung Yong-hwa Japan Concert 2017 "Summer Calling" and the 2018 Jung Yong-hwa Live "Room 622" concert tours as the final encore song.

=== Japanese version ===
On February 5, 2015, a short version music video of the Japanese-language rendition of the single entitled "Aru Suteki na Hi" (ある素敵な日; "One Fine Day") was unveiled. The song was made available on online music stores in Japan on February 18. The full music video was uploaded on February 27.

== Critical reception ==
Writing for Billboard magazine, columnist Jeff Benjamin ranked "One Fine Day" number four on his list of the best solo debuts in the first half of 2015, calling it as "an awe-inducing ballad". In a critical review of the album, Jung Min-jae of online magazine IZM described the track as an "outdated" ballad which was "worn out by singers before him".

== Commercial performance ==
On the chart dated January 18 – 24, 2015, "One Fine Day" debuted at number three on South Korea's national Gaon Digital Chart, selling 63,556 downloads and accumulating 1,108,089 streams in its first week. By the end of the year, "One Fine Day" shifted 313,491 downloads domestically.

== Charts ==
Korean version
Chart (2015)	Peak position
Gaon Digital Chart	3
Gaon Mobile Chart	9
