= Door hanger =

Plastic or cardboard sign cut to hang from a door handle

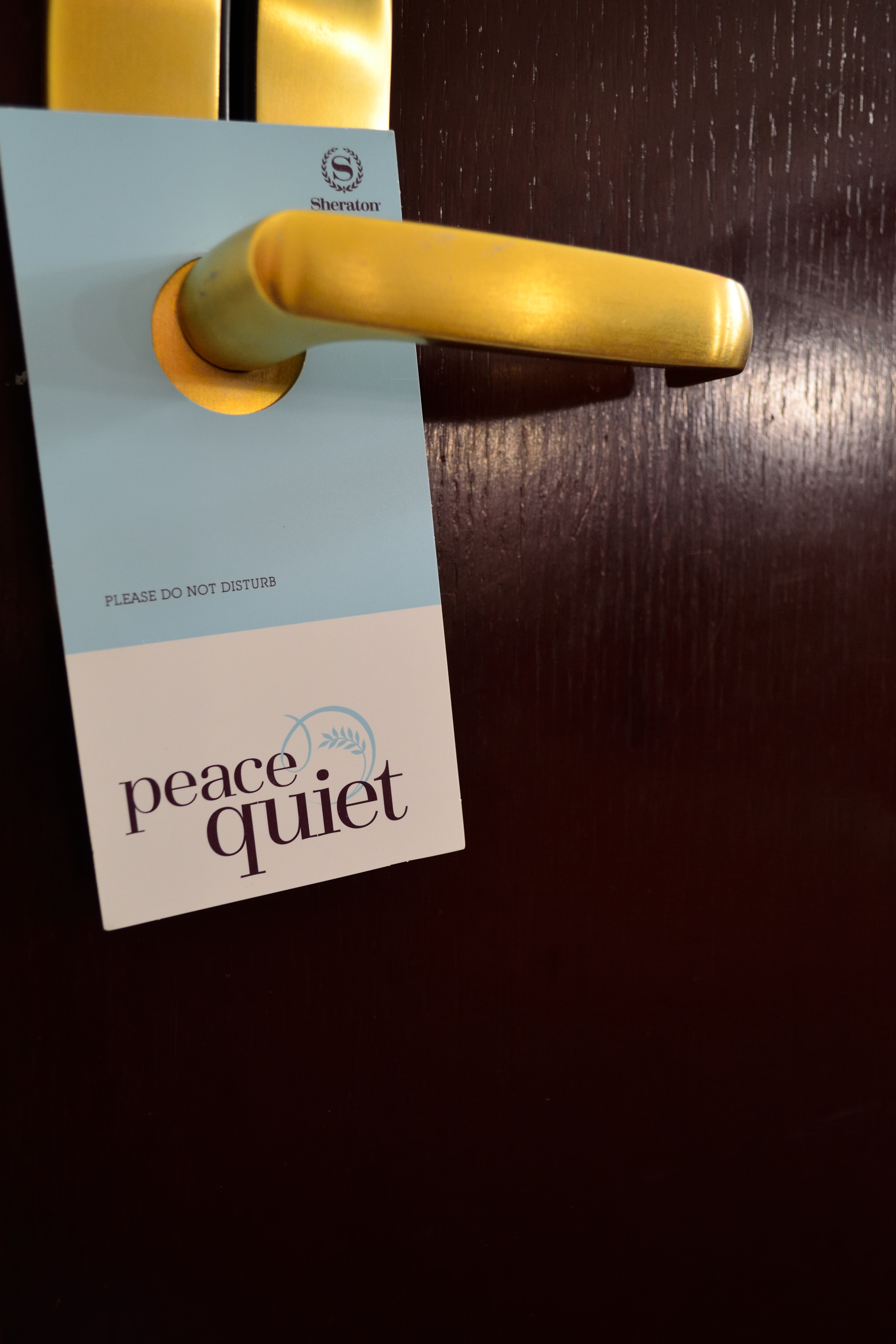
Common Do not disturb sign of a hotel

A door hanger (also spelled doorhanger or door-hanger) is a plastic or cardboard sign, generally rectangular in shape, cut to hang from the handle or knob of a door. They are sometimes used to distribute print advertising to residences. Door hangers are often seen in hotels and other places of lodging as a means for guests to communicate with maintenance and housekeeping staff.

== Uses ==
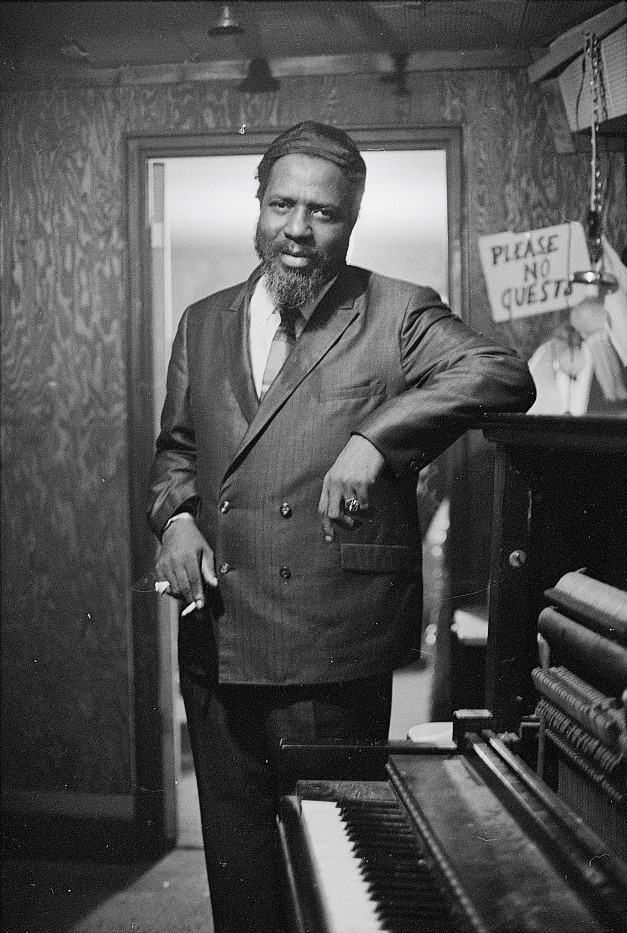
Thelonious Monk with a "Please no guests" sign at Village Gate jazz club, New York City, 1968

One common place where do-not-disturb signs are used is in places of lodging, where guests can place these signs on the door to inform staff, including housekeeping, to respect their privacy. Some hotels also provide "make up room" signs giving the opposite instructions.

Do not disturb signs can also be used by those who keep valuables in their rooms to deter possible thieves. They are also used in schools to let other staff members and students at the school know that testing is in progress in the particular classroom.

A stereotypical reason for using a "do not disturb" sign is to not interrupt sexual activity going on in a hotel room.

== Problems ==
In multiple cases, a do not disturb sign on the door of a hotel room has been blamed for concealing a homicide, suspicious death, or other criminal activity.

In 2009, a do not disturb sign was blamed for concealing the disappearance of an elderly couple on a cruise ship.

In 2017, mass murderer Stephen Paddock kept a "do not disturb" sign on his hotel room door, concealing ten suitcases with a stockpile of rifles and ammunition he used to commit the 2017 Las Vegas shooting.

== Alternatives ==
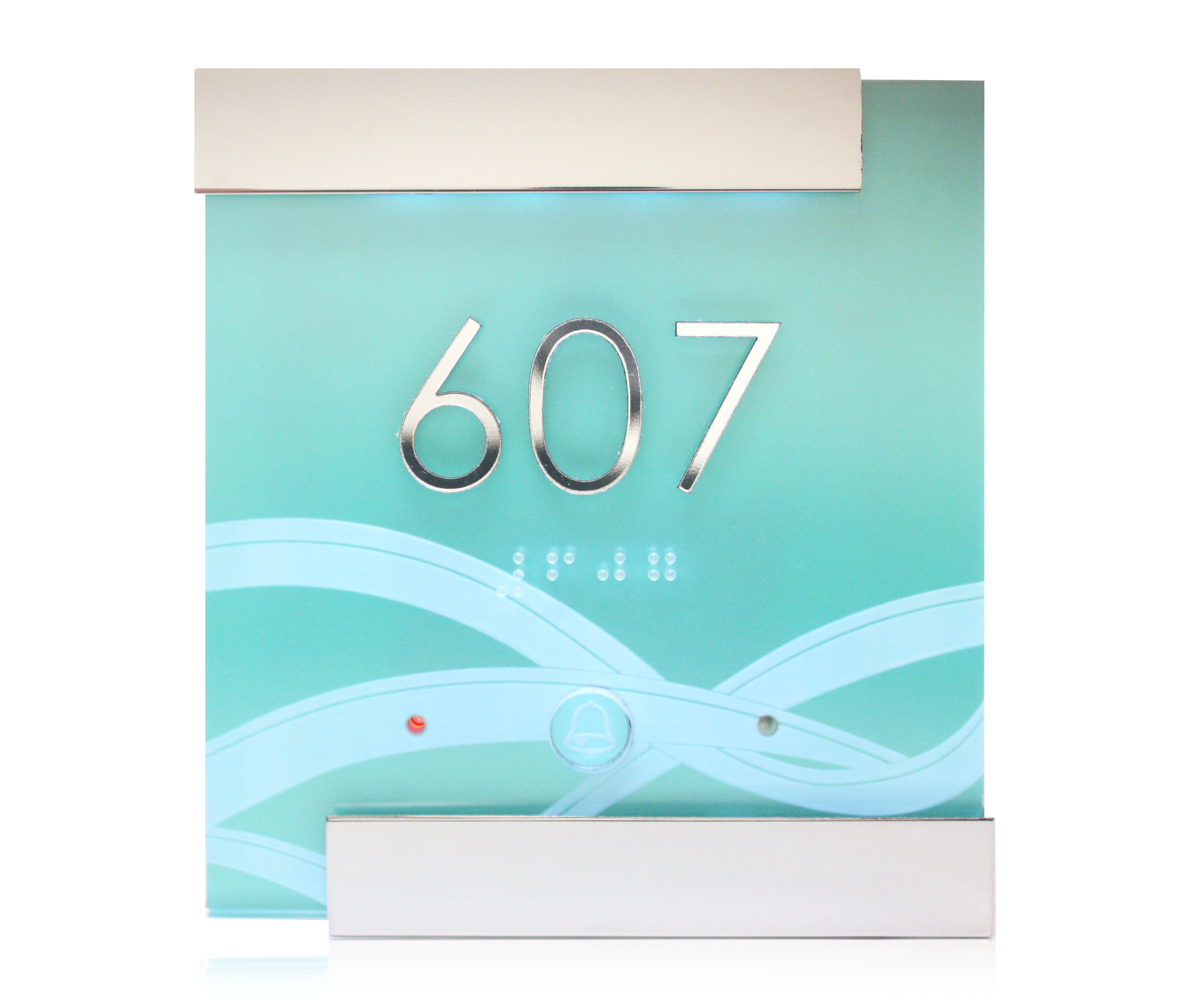
An electronic "do not disturb" indicator (the illuminated red lamp is a signal to hotel staff).

Some hotels are using high-tech means to replace paper do not disturb signs that hang on the door. One example is a privacy button that one can press from within the room to light up an indicator outside the room.

== Advertising ==
More recently, hotels have used the do not disturb signs as a way to brand themselves and provide inexpensive advertising.

In 2007, Embassy Suites ran a contest allowing the public to design do not disturb signs. The winner was announced in 2008.

Door Hangers are also used in competition with direct mail as an advertising vehicle. Most recently, companies providing this type of advertising have been using the term Direct to Door Advertising. This type of advertising offers a number of advantages over traditional direct mail in that the impression is "guaranteed". The home owner must handle the piece and typically on a door hanger there is just one advertising message giving the advertiser exposure.

This form of advertising is a security risk for residents as it flags a door as being unused. As such, this form of advertisement violates bylaws in many cities, and even where it is legal may damage the advertiser's reputation.

This type of advertising is used by national brands and local companies to help drive traffic into their stores, increase trial by offering a sample, and to increase their brand awareness. This method of delivery can often be more cost effective and with today's technology, the delivery of the pieces is completely trackable by integrating GPS and photos into the Proof of Performance.

== Other meanings ==
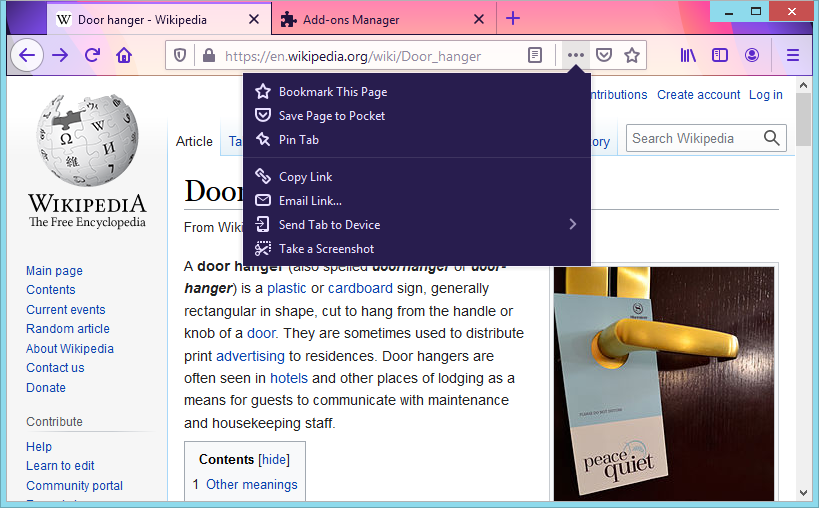
Doorhanger user interface element in Firefox 85, "hanging" from search bar icon.

In computer user interface design, a "doorhanger" notification is a sort of pop-up panel that "hangs" from another user interface element, typically an icon in the tool bar.
