= Summer Calling =

- Regular Edition cover

Studio album by Jung Yong-hwa
- Released: August 9, 2017
- Genre: Pop
- Length: 27:48
- Languages: English, Korean
- Label: Warner Music Japan

Jung Yong-hwa chronology
Do Disturb (2017)	Summer Calling (2017)	Feel the Y's City (2020)

Singles from Summer Calling
- 1. "Summer Dream" Released: July 26, 2017

Summer Calling is the second Japanese studio album by South Korean musician and CNBLUE member Jung Yong-hwa. It was released on August 9, 2017, under Warner Music Japan in three editions: Regular Edition, Limited Edition, and a fan club-only Boice Limited Edition.

Summer Calling went on to debut at number three on Japan's national weekly Oricon Albums Chart. The singer is set to embark on the Jung Yong-hwa Concert 2017 "Summer Calling" tour from August to October in Osaka, Kanagawa, Chiba, and Kobe.

== Content and packaging ==
Summer Calling compromises four tracks previously released on Jung's Korean mini-album Do Disturb (2017), in addition to four new tracks. It was released in three editions: a Regular Edition; a Limited Edition that includes the music video and a special feature of "Summer Dream", and a Boice Edition that comes with a Yong-hwa Summer Bracelet.

== Music structure ==
Summer Calling is a pop record. Describing it as a summer album, Jung sought to create a "fresh" and "bright" atmosphere with his music. Feeling that balladry suits winter, he decided against including a standard ballad on the record. "Summer Dream" was described as a "trendy" dance track claimed to "cool off the summer heat". "Closer" is a light medium tempo song. In its lyrics, the narrator "asks his love to stick by his side". "Not Anymore" is a R&B-pop ballad which serves homage to the sound and lyricism of the 1990s by following the melodic progression and the implementation of a synthesizer common during that time period. It deals with the mourning of a breakup. "Password" is an "addictive" deep house track. His first attempt at the genre, he described as a "party" song with elements of pop music which fixates around "repetitive" hooks and lyrics. The album closes with "Navigation", a song which consists of piano and strings, as well as a "calm" melody. Set in medium-tempo, the song opens with the sound of ocean waves. It is a "lyrical" song which was inspired by his "poor sense of direction". The lyrics hint as "social isolation", but also intends to "cheer up the listener". Jung noted that "dreams and goals" help him "navigate" his life, and feels "lost" without them.

== Release and promotion ==
On June 20, 2017, a music video teaser for "Summer Dream" was unveiled on YouTube. The full music video was released on July 20, featuring model Laren Tsai as Jung's romantic partner. Serving as the lead single for the album, "Summer Dream" was released as a digital download on July 26. An album digest was uploaded two days later.

He is scheduled to embark on the Jung Yong-hwa Concert 2017 "Summer Calling" tour. The first pair of concerts will take place between August 22–23 at the Festival Hall in Osaka, followed by three concerts between August 29–31 at Pacifico Yokohama in Kanagawa. Additional concerts were added, which will take place between September 9–10 at the Makuhari Messe Event Hall in Chiba and October 7–8 at the World Memorial Hall in Kobe.

== Commercial performance ==
Summer Calling shifted 17,060 copies in its first day of release. On the issue dated August 21, 2017, the album debuted at number three on Japan's national Oricon Albums Chart, selling 21,310 copies in its first week. It has sold 23,131 physical copies domestically since its release. On its Digital Albums Chart, it ranked at number nine with 772 copies sold. On the same issue date, it also debuted at number four on both the Billboard Japan Hot Albums and Top Albums Sales charts.

== Track listing ==
Track listing
No.	Title	Lyrics	Music	Arrangement	Length
1.	"Intro"		Jung Yong-hwa	Jung Yong-hwa	1:22
2.	"Summer Dream"	Jung Yong-hwa	Jung Yong-hwa, Justin Reinstein	Justin Reinstein	3:54
3.	"Closer"	Jung Yong-hwa	Jung Yong-hwa, Justin Reinstein	Justin Reinstein	3:48
4.	"Make You Mine"	Jung Yong-hwa	Jung Yong-hwa, Justin Reinstein	Justin Reinstein	3:55
5.	"Life Is a Party"	Jung Yong-hwa	Erik Lidbom, Jimmy Burney, Andreas Oberg	Erik Lidbom	3:32
6.	"Not Anymore"	Jung Yong-hwa	Jung Yong-hwa	Jung Jin-wook	4:13
7.	"Password"	Jung Yong-hwa	Jung Yong-hwa, Peter Wallevik, Carl Altino	Peter Wallevik, Carl Altino	3:06
8.	"Navigation"	Jung Yong-hwa	Jung Yong-hwa	Kim Chang-rak	3:58
Total length:					27:48

== Charts ==
Chart (2017)	Peak position
Billboard Japan Hot Albums	4
Billboard Japan Top Albums Sales	4
Oricon Albums Chart	3
Oricon Digital Albums Chart	9
