= Can't Stop (EP) =

EP by CNBLUE
- Released: 24 February 2014
- Recorded: 2013–2014
- Genre: Pop-rock, power pop, alternative rock
- Length: 21:56
- Language: Korean
- Label: FNC Entertainment / CJ E&M Music and Live
- Producer: Jung Yong-hwa, Han Seong-ho, Han Seung-hun, Kim Jae-yang

CNBLUE chronology
Korea Best Album 'Present' (2014)	Can't Stop (2014)	Wave (2014)

Singles from Can't Stop
- 1. "Can't Stop" Released: 24 February 2014

Can't Stop is the fifth Korean extended play (ninth overall) by the South Korean rock band CNBLUE. It was released on February 24, 2014, with the track "Can't Stop" as the promotional single. This mini album marked a change in CNBLUE's music. Its lead singer, Jung Yong-hwa, ditched the guitar and played piano on most of the songs. The style of this album is, as its lead singer said in an interview, a bit of Brit rock meets melodic pop rock and even Latin melodies that can be heard in "Diamond Girl".

== Reception ==
In December, 2014, Billboard K-Town included the EP on its list of "The 10 Best K-Pop Albums of 2014" at #9, calling the tracks "Can't Stop" and "Like a Child" "some of the most accessible Korean rock tunes to come out of the scene this year", and "Cold Love" a "gritty ballad" and "Diamond Girl" a feisty rock jam.

== Track listing ==
Track list
No.	Title	Lyrics	Music	Arrangement	Length
1.	"Can't Stop"	Jung Yong-hwa; Heaven Light	Jung Yong-hwa; Heaven Light	Heaven Light	3:57
2.	"Diamond Girl"	Jung Yong-hwa	Jung Yong-hwa	Jung Yong-hwa; Heaven Light	3:06
3.	"Cold Love"	Jung Yong-hwa	Jung Yong-hwa	Jung Yong-hwa; Heaven Light	3:42
4.	"Sleepless Night..."	Lee Jong-hyun; Heaven Light	Lee Jong-hyun; Heaven Light	Lee Jong-hyun; Heaven Light	3:45
5.	"Love Is..."	Jung Yong-hwa	Jung Yong-hwa; Heaven Light	Jung Yong-hwa; Heaven Light	3:57
6.	"Like A Child"	Jung Yong-hwa	Jung Yong-hwa	Jung Yong-hwa; Heaven Light	3:49
Total length:					22:16

== Album sales ==
Country	Chart	Peak position	Sales
Japan	Oricon Physical sales		
South Korea	Gaon Album Physical Sales	1	113,338+
South Korea	Gaon Singles Physical Sales	3	

== Release history ==
Country	Date	Format	Label
South Korea	February 24, 2014	CD, Digital download	FNC Entertainment; CJ E&M Music and Live
Worldwide	February 24, 2014	Digital download	FNC Entertainment; CJ E&M Music and Live
South Korea	November 7, 2016	CD (re-issue)	FNC Entertainment; LOEN Entertainment
