= You, My Star =

Single by Jung Yong-hwa

from the album One Fine Day
- Released: December 23, 2014
- Recorded: 2014
- Genre: Acoustic folk
- Length: 3:34
- Label: FNC Entertainment
- Songwriters: Jung Yong-hwa, Han Seung-hoon, Go Jin-young

Jung Yong-hwa singles chronology
"Because I Miss You..." (2011)	"You, My Star" (2014)	"Mileage" (2015)

"You, My Star" (별, 그대; Byeol, Geudae) is a song by South Korean musician Jung Yong-hwa of CNBLUE. Written in dedication to his fans, the song was released on December 23, 2014, under FNC Entertainment. Two days prior, Jung performed the song on the year-end music program SBS Gayo Daejeon. "You, My Star" debuted and peaked at number 22 on South Korea's national Gaon Digital Chart; all proceeds went to the label's charity Love FNC.

== Background and composition ==
"You, My Star" is an acoustic folk track written to showcase Jung's appreciation of his fans. The song was written and composed by Jung; Han Seung-hoon and Go Jin-young also contributed to the composition. It is composed in the key of C major using common time with a tempo of 105 beats per minute.

== Release and promotion ==
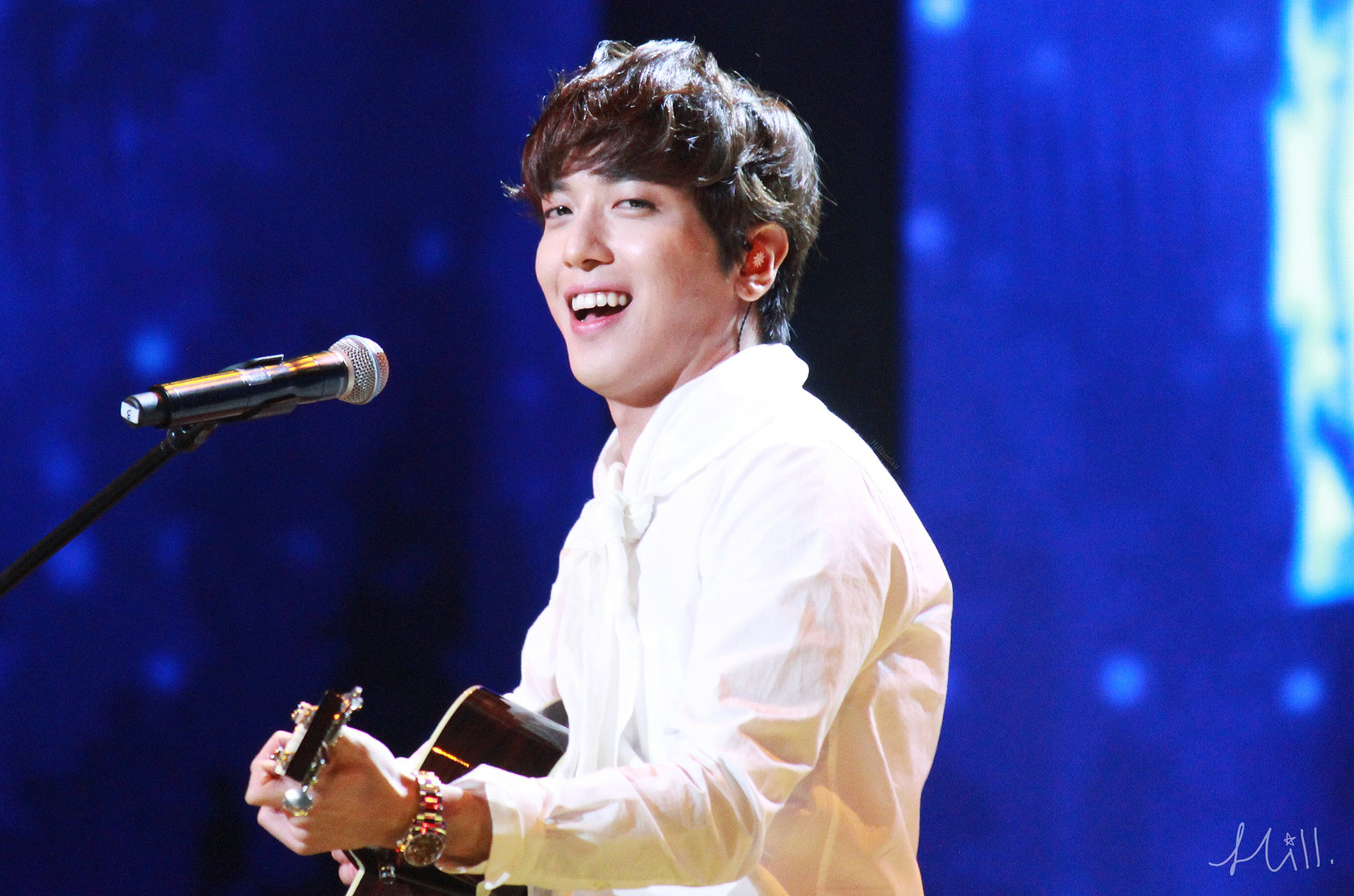
Jung at the 15th annual Top Chinese Music Awards in Shenzhen

Jung first performed "You, My Star" at the SBS Gayo Daejeon on December 21, 2014. It was digitally released two days later, with full proceeds going towards FNC Entertainment's charity Love FNC. It was later included as a hidden track on his debut solo album One Fine Day (2015). Jung also performed the song with Min-ah of Girl's Day on the January 25, 2015 broadcast of Seoul Broadcasting System's (SBS) music program Inkigayo for its 800th episode. A music video for the song was uploaded on February 26; Jung dedicated it to his fans. He went on to perform the song at 15th annual Top Chinese Music Awards.

== Critical reception ==
Writing for Idology as 'Mimyo', musician Moon Yong-min noted that the song "progresses neatly with a refreshing rhythm", pointing out that the "organization of drums and the guitar gently varies over the progression of each section". Citing the difference between CNBLUE's music, he expressed that "showing a sense of maturity with this kind of relaxed and refreshingly moderate song is not a bad idea".

== Commercial performance ==
On the chart dated December 21 – 27, 2014, "You, My Star" debuted at number 22 on South Korea's national Gaon Digital Chart, selling 45,234 downloads and accumulating 730,091 streams in its first week of release. By the end of the month, the song sold 54,883 downloads in the country, and 73,332 downloads by the end of January of the following year. (Note: Accumulation of the first two months: 54,883, 18,449.)

== Charts ==
Chart (2014)	Peak position
Gaon Digital Chart	22
Gaon Mobile Chart	9
