= Do Disturb =

EP by Jung Yong-hwa
- Released: July 19, 2017
- Recorded: March 2017
- Studio: FNC Entertainment Studio (Seoul)
- Genre: Pop
- Length: 22:39
- Label: FNC Entertainment
- Producers: Han Seong-ho (exec.); Jung Yong-hwa; Han Seung-hun; Kim Chang-rak

Jung Yong-hwa chronology
One Fine Day (2015)	Do Disturb (2017)	Summer Calling (2017)

Alternate cover
- Special edition cover

Singles from Do Disturb
- 1. "That Girl" Released: July 19, 2017

Do Disturb is the first mini-album by South Korean musician and CNBLUE member Jung Yong-hwa. It was released on July 19, 2017, under FNC Entertainment. Its title was inspired by a "do not disturb" door hanger. Consisting of dance music tracks and balladry, the record sees a sonic shift from Jung's previous music with his band and as a solo artist.

Following a series of photo and video teasers, Do Disturb and its lead single "That Girl" were concurrently released. The mini-album peaked at number three on South Korea's national Gaon Album Chart.

== Background and recording ==
Jung began crafting the record in March 2017. In midst of a break while on tour, Jung hung a "do not disturb" door hanger in front of his hotel room, inspiring the title of the record.

Recording and mixing for Do Disturb took place in Seoul at the FNC Entertainment Studio; it was mastered at 821 Sound Mastering.

== Music structure ==
A pop album, Do Disturb compromises various genres in the record, distinguishing itself from Jung's previous work with CNBLUE and his solo work. The first half of the mini-album consists of dance music, with the second half containing "slow-paced emotional" songs. "That Girl" is a dance-pop song with a "funky sound". "Closer" is a light medium tempo song. In the lyrics, the narrator "asks his love to stick by his side". Jung described it as the "sweet" song on the record; the chorus was initially written in English, but was later translated to Korean. "Password" is an "addictive" deep house track. His first attempt at the genre, he described as a "party" song with elements of pop music which fixates around "repetitive" hooks and lyrics.

"Navigation" is a "calm" melody which consists of piano and strings. Set in medium-tempo, the song opens with the sound of ocean waves. It is a "lyrical" song which was inspired by his "poor sense of direction". The lyrics hint as "social isolation", but also intends to "cheer up the listener". He noted that "dreams and goals" help him "navigate" his life, and feels "lost" without them. "Not Anymore" is a R&B-pop ballad which serves homage to the sound and lyricism of the 1990s by following the melodic progression and the implementation of a synthesizer common during that time period. Jung co-wrote the song with a keyboardist, which whom he worked with on his first solo concert tour; Jeon Geun-hwa provides vocals for the chorus. It deals with the mourning of a breakup. The closing track "Lost in Time" is a "traditional" ballad with a "tranquil" melody. Jung utilized a similar chord progression to "Last Leaf" from his debut studio album One Fine Day (2015), calling it an "extension" of the song. It "captures the sadness" of the narrator seeking to forget his former lover.

== Artwork concept and packaging ==
Do Disturb was released in two editions. The standard version cover of the mini-album depicts Jung in black-and-white monochrome, contrasted against colorful tropical plants in the form of decalcomania in order to emit a summery aura. Not part of the original design, the decalcomania was inspired by a trip Jung took to Hawaii, where he "fell in love with the place". Shot in the Hongdae, Seoul, Jung collaborated with a photographer of Arena Korea magazine for the album photography. It showcases him wearing a colored, patterned Hawaiian shirt. Formed in the shape of a book, its contents include a 96-page photo booklet, a poster, and one random selfie photo card.

Designed and hand-drawn by Jung, the special version cover depicts a red door hanger affixed with a pupil, signifying that "the eye is watching". It is set against a golden backdrop of the logo of his "JYH" initials. The album photography shows Jung donning white apparel as sun rays shimmer through curtains, producing a "relaxed" environment. He sought to take photos of "close-up shots of my body parts". The packaging includes 24-page photo booklet, a poster, and one random selfie photo card.

== Release and promotion ==
The release of the record was first announced on June 19, 2017. Beginning on July 10, FNC Entertainment released a series of teasers to promote Do Disturb. The record company launched a teaser site entitled Summer Night Beginning. On the following day, a concept trailer for the lead the song was unveiled. A series of photo teasers were uploaded for the standard and special versions between July 12–13, respectively. A highlight medley for the record and art spoiler were released on the subsequent day. On July 17, a music video trailer for "That Girl" was released. Do Disturb and the music video for "That Girl" featuring Loco was concurrently released on July 19.

On July 21, Jung began promoting "That Girl" by performing the song on weekly music chart shows. In addition to the lead single, he also performed "Lost in Time" on Mnet's M Countdown, Korean Broadcasting System's (KBS) Music Bank, Munhwa Broadcasting Corporation's (MBC) Show! Music Core, Seoul Broadcasting System's (SBS) Inkigayo, and MBC Music's Show Champion.

== Commercial performance ==
On the chart dated July 16–22, 2017, Do Disturb debuted at number three on South Korea's national Gaon Album Chart. Spending two consecutive weeks at its peak, the mini-album sold 58,982 copies domestically by the end of the month. It ranked at number 12 on Billboard magazine's World Albums Chart. In Japan, the mini-album debuted at number 27 on the weekly Oricon Albums Chart, selling 2,861 copies in its first week. It has sold 6,118 copies in the country since its release.

== Critical reception ==
Writing for online magazine IZM, Jung Min-jae rated Do Disturb three and a half stars out of five, describing Jung's "musical caliber" is "highly commendable". He complimented the "well-made tracks" and the "delightfully diverse genres" included on the record. He mused, "it is clear that he has solidified his competitiveness as a soloist through making this superb pop album". However, he criticized the song lyrics for its shortcomings, pointing out that the "shallow stories don't imbue much depth into one's listening, and one-dimensional metaphors don't amount to repeated enjoyment." Overall, he deemed Do Disturb as satisfying mini-album.

Do Disturb earned Jung a nomination for the Golden Disc Album Award at the 32nd Golden Disc Awards.

== Track listing ==
Track listing
No.	Title	Lyrics	Music	Arrangement	Length
1.	"That Girl" (여자여자해; Yeojayeojahae) (featuring Loco)	Jung Yong-hwa, Loco	Jung Yong-hwa, TJ Routon, Jarah Gibson of 80HDMuzik	TJ Routon	3:28
2.	"Closer" (딱 붙어; Ttak Buteo)	Jung Yong-hwa	Jung Yong-hwa, Justin Reinstein	Justin Reinstein	3:47
3.	"Password"	Jung Yong-hwa	Jung Yong-hwa, Peter Wallevik, Carl Altino	Peter Wallevik, Carl Altino	3:04
4.	"Navigation"	Jung Yong-hwa	Jung Yong-hwa	Kim Chang-nak	3:59
5.	"Not Anymore" (대답하지 마; Daedaphaji Ma)	Jung Yong-hwa	Jung Yong-hwa	Kim Jin-wook	4:11
6.	"Lost in Time" (널 잊는 시간 속; Neol Inneun Sigan Sok)	Jung Yong-hwa	Jung Yong-hwa	Kim Jin-wook	4:10
Total length:					22:39

== Personnel ==
Credits adapted from the album's liner notes.

- Jung Yong-hwa – lyricist, composer, background vocalist
- Carl Altino – composer
- An Deok-gi – making photo
- Bae Hun-jik – recording engineer
- Baek Sang-woo – artist management
- Choi Eun-jeong – artist management
- Choi Yong-bin – photography
- Choi Yun-jin – A&R, publishing
- Jarah Gibson – composer, background vocalist
- Han Ho – artist management
- Han Seong-ho – executive producer
- Han Seong-jun – artist management
- Han Seung-hun – producer
- Hong Ji-su – artist management
- Im Ji-yeon – A&R, media planning
- Jang Bit-na – assistant stylist
- Jeon Geun-hwa – background vocalist
- Jo Seong-wan – supervisor
- Jung Bo-yeong – makeup
- Jung Eun-bi – international business
- Jung Eun-gyeong – customer relationship management
- Jung Eun-ji – contents planning, marketing
- Jung Go-eun – customer relationship management
- Jung Jae-pil – guitar
- Jung Jin-wook – arranger
- Jung Yu-jin – customer relationship management
- Kang Jong-hyeok – artist management
- Kim Chang-rak – arranger, producer
- Kim Ha-yeon – media planning
- Kim Hang-a – art direction, design
- Kim Hye-rim – artist management
- Kim Ji-hye – contents planning, marketing
- Kim Ji-yu – customer relationship management
- Kim Ji-yun – art direction, design
- Kim Jin-a – contents planning, marketing
- Kim Na-yeon – visual communication
- Kim Seong-han – contents planning, marketing
- Kim Se-yong – making photo
- Kim Su-hee – contents planning, marketing
- Kim Tae-hyeok – artist management
- Kim Ye-jin – international business
- Kim Yeong-seon – contents planning, marketing
- Kim Yong-seup – media planning
- Kim Yong-won – artist management
- Kim Yu-jin – international business, customer relationship management, art direction, design
- Ryu Hae-rang – MCS
- Kwon Nam-woo – mastering engineer
- Kwon Woo-mi – A&R
- Lee Ga-eun – international business
- Lee Ga-yeong – international business
- Lee Hae-yeong – publishing
- Lee Hye-yeong – stylist
- Lee Jeong-woo – bass
- Lee Ji-yeong – media planning
- Lee Seung-ho – artist management
- Lee Yu-jin – mixing engineer
- Loco – lyricist
- Ma Se-bin – international business
- Park Jeong-min – recording engineer, mixing engineer
- Park Mi-hyeong – hair
- Park Sang-hyeon – artist management
- Park So-hyeon – artist management
- Pyo Jin-hee – customer relationship management
- Justin Reinstein – composer, arranger
- Ryu Min-a – MCS
- Seo Seok-bin – visual communication
- Seong Jong-jin – artist management
- Seong Sang-hyeon – international business
- Song Yun-ho – MCS
- TJ Routon – composer, arranger
- Peter Wallevik – composer
- Woo Hyeon-sik – artist management
- Yang Hee-won – artist management
- Yeo Hwan-gu – artist management
- Yoo Sun-ho – media planning
- Yoon Hye-jin – art direction, design
- Yoon Hyeon-jun – visual communication
- Yoon Je-yun – artist management
- Yoon Seul-gi – recording engineer

== Charts ==
Chart (2017)	Peak position
Billboard World Albums Chart	12
Gaon Album Chart	3
Oricon Albums Chart	27

== Sales ==
Region	Sales
Japan (Oricon)	6,118+
South Korea (Gaon)	65,771+
