= One Fine Day (Jung Yong-hwa album) =

Studio album by Jung Yong-hwa
- Released: January 20, 2015
- Recorded: 2013–14
- Studios: FNC Entertainment Studio (Seoul); Brand New Music Studio (Seoul); The JFJ Lab (Taipei); T Studio (Seoul)
- Genres: Pop, rock
- Length: 40:09
- Languages: Korean, English
- Label: FNC Entertainment
- Producers: Han Seong-ho (exec.); Jung Yong-hwa; Han Seung-hoon; Kim Jae-yang

Jung Yong-hwa chronology
| One Fine Day (2015) | Do Disturb (2017) |

Alternate cover
- Special edition cover

Singles from One Fine Day
- 1. "Mileage" Released: January 9, 2015; 2. "One Fine Day" Released: January 20, 2015

One Fine Day (어느 멋진 날; Eoneu Meotjin Nal) is the debut solo studio album by South Korean musician Jung Yong-hwa of CNBLUE. It was released on January 20, 2015, by FNC Entertainment and distributed by CJ E&M. As CNBLUE's promotions for their mini-album Can't Stop (2014) came to a close, the label announced plans for Jung to release a solo album within the year. Since the album's inception, he sought to distance himself from the band's sound and include various musical styles on the record. Ultimately, he conceived a collaborative album with an array of musicians.

By late 2014, the album was scheduled to be released in early 2015. Teasers revealing the musicians Jung collaborated with were released one-by-one the following January, which included rapper Verbal Jint, rock musician Yoon Do-hyun, and Singaporean singer JJ Lin. The album was preceded by "Mileage" on January 9, a collaboriation with actor and rapper Yang Dong-geun (YDG). After a series of photo and video teasers thereafter, the album and lead single "One Fine Day" were concurrently released. Jung began promoting the album by performing "One Fine Day" and the collaboration tracks on music chart programs across various television networks. The single ultimately led him to win a total of four music show trophies, including two consecutive wins on Korean Broadcasting System's (KBS) Music Bank.

One Fine Day received generally favorable reviews from music critics, who noted his growth as a singer-songwriter, but also cited the familiarity with CNBLUE's music. The album went on to top the Gaon Album Chart for two non-consecutive weeks. In March, a Japanese edition titled Aru Suteki na Hi: Japan Special Edition (ある素敵な日 ～Japan Special Edition～) was released, which peaked at number four on the weekly Oricon Albums Chart. Jung embarked on his first series of solo concerts across Asia; select shows were recorded and released as live and video albums. By the end of 2015, One Fine Day sold over 115,000 copies domestically.

== Background and development ==
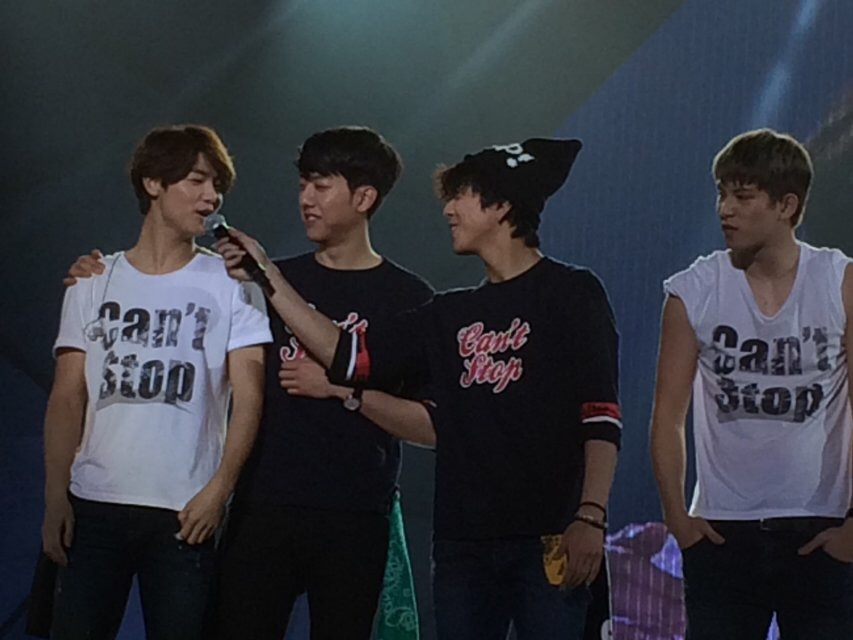
2014 CNBLUE Live [Can't Stop] concert in Nanjing, China

With CNBLUE's domestic promotions for its fifth mini-album Can't Stop coming to an end in March 2014, it was announced that Jung was expected to be releasing a solo album during the second half of the year. During the May 3 press conference for the band's 2014 Can't Stop Tour in Bangkok, Thailand, Jung revealed that he expected to collaborate with other musicians for the record. He completed recording half of the album by the following month. During this time, he contacted a range of musicians to collaborate with. Jung subsequently began filming TVN's television series The Three Musketeers, which stalled the development of the album. The album's release date was pushed back to January 2015.

In crafting One Fine Day, Jung set out to produce a diverse album with a mix of various music styles, leading him to deliberately "pace out the recordings" of the tracks. He wanted to make an album that would "be loved by people of the whole world". While discussing the contrast from his solo work and CNBLUE's music, Jung acknowledged that there would not be a "180-degree" difference between the two. He explained that, with CNBLUE's music, he had to take into account the taste of his bandmates. With his solo material, he "paid more care in terms of arrangement and mixing" of his music rather than "changing something inorganically". It allowed him more musical freedom, which in turn put him under more pressure. He described his desire to create songs with "angry and rebellious emotions", but he avoided "intentionally writing that kind of music". He aspired to "show listeners the positive side of things... to give out positive and optimistic messages". He spent two years thinking of recording the album, and just over one to record it.

== Writing and recording ==
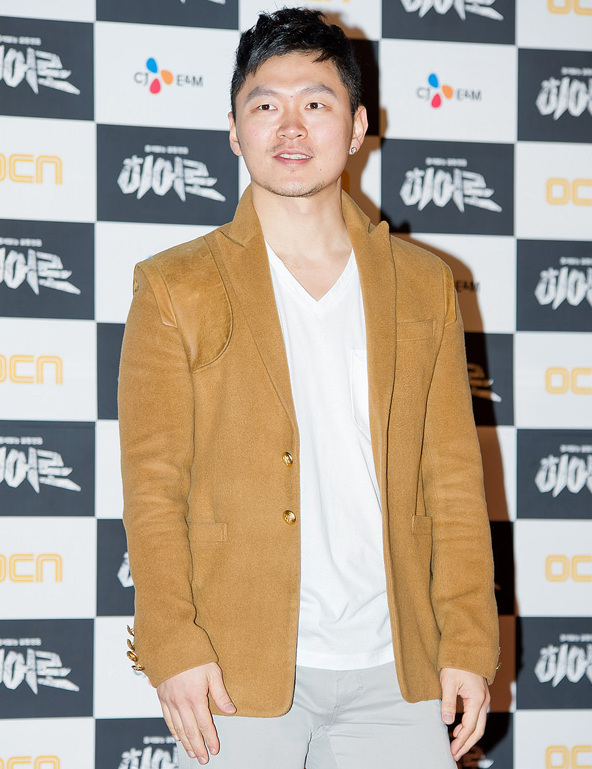
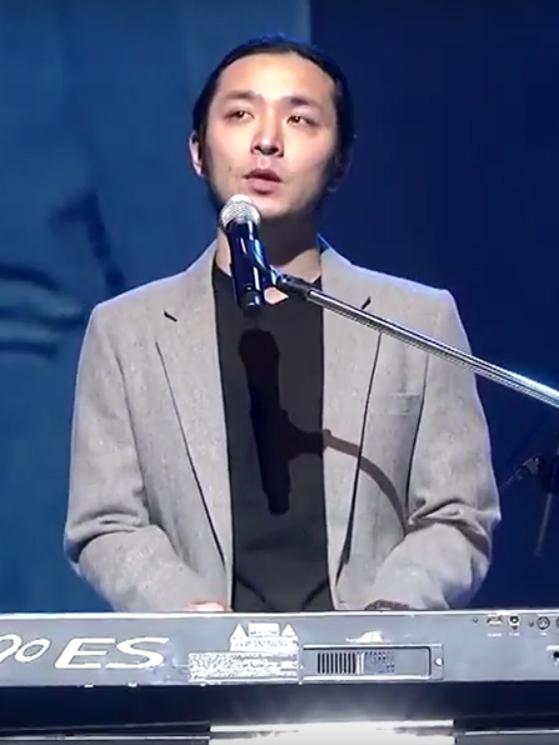
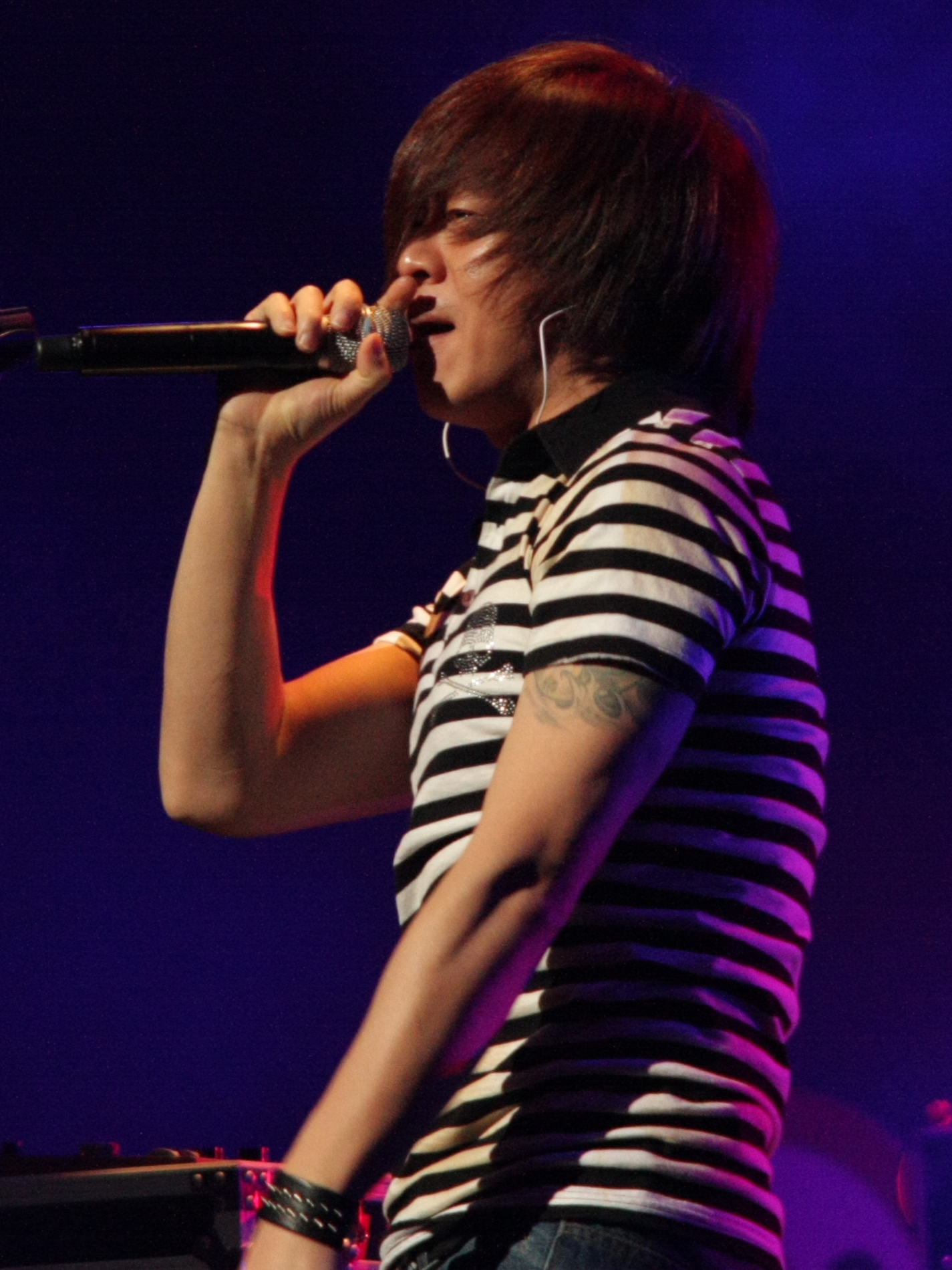
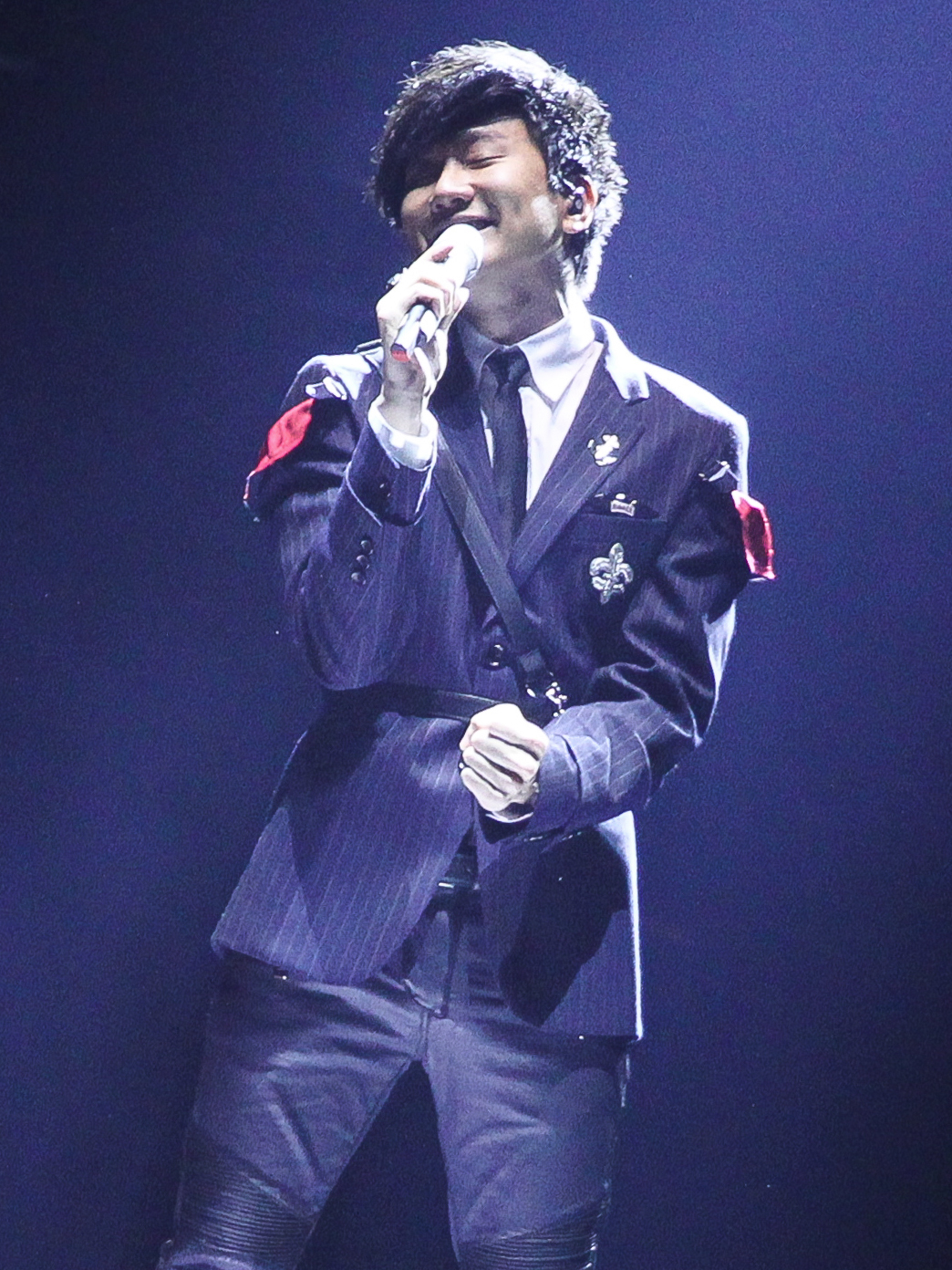
Jung enlisted an array of musicians to collaborate on One Fine Day. From left: YDG, Verbal Jint, Yoon Do-hyun, JJ Lin

In midst of filming TVN's television series The Three Musketeers, Jung was inspired by YDG's conveyance of endearment to his family on set to write the melody for "Mileage". After listening to the recording, YDG immediately wrote his rap. He felt that Jung was a "musician who has overcome genres". In wanting to work with Verbal Jint, Jung expressed his admiration in the rapper's ability to craft acoustic hip-hop songs with sensible lyrics. Verbal Jint proposed the song "Energy" to him, where the rapper strayed from his musical roots for only the second time in his career. In suggesting the song title, Verbal Jint felt that it "would be applicable to all those whose shoulders are lagging from fatigue"; Jung "found it interesting and accepted it right away". After receiving the beat, Verbal Jint wrote the first verse and chorus to the song, and Jung completed the second verse. During recording, Jung contributed additional lyrics to the chorus. Following a series of impromptus, and consuming pizza and coffee, they completed the song after an all-nighter.

While writing "Cruel Memories", Jung envisioned Yoon Do-hyun of rock band YB singing the song. Yoon expressed his desire to see CNBLUE flourish into a "true band" and decided that "it'd be great to give him [Jung] a hand". In conceiving "Cruel Memories...", the pair sought to "create a boom among Korean men so that they go to karaokes in duos and sing their hearts out with this song, facing each other". Jung first met JJ Lin in 2014 when he attended a CNBLUE concert in Taiwan. After meeting, they began to listen to each other's music and "felt good about it"; they promised to collaborate. Jung invited him to collaborate, which Lin agreed upon. The two wrote "Checkmate" together, but recorded the song independently from one another.

Five months prior to meeting Jung, blues musician Peter Malick received a signed copy of CNBLUE's mini-album Can't Stop. He felt that it was a "great album" and was "amazed by CNBLUE's musical talent". In May 2014, Jung traveled to Los Angeles, California, to sing the South Korean national anthem "Aegukga" for Korea Night at the Dodger Stadium and to support baseball player Hyun-jin Ryu. During his trip, he met with Malick in his home studio through an acquaintance. While there, Jung asked Malick to work with him, in which he agreed. Upon returning to Korea, Jung began to exchange demos with Malick. After being with family in midst of touring in Japan, Jung returned home and completed writing the lyrics for the song. The record production for "27 Years" was completed afterward.

In midst of recording One Fine Day, bandmates Kang Min-hyuk and Lee Jong-hyun would visit Jung and listen to the album tracks. The album was recorded in Seoul at the FNC Entertainment Studio, Brand New Music Studio, T Studio, and in Taipei at The JFJ Lab. Mixing took place at the Bono Studio, FNC Entertainment Studio, Cube Studio, Wsound, and MasterPiece SoundLab; it was mastered at the Suono Mastering Studio, JFS Studio, and MasterPiece SoundLab.

== Music structure ==
Musically, One Fine Day encompasses hip hop, rock, and blues music. It explores the themes of love and mending in its lyrics. "One Fine Day" is a breakup song. The narrator recalls his former girlfriend and recollects his memories of their relationship, which he describes as "fine days". "Cruel Memories" is a rock ballad that expresses gloominess. "Mileage" is a song that highlights Jung's signature "light rhythm" and "easy-listening melody style". Jung described "Without You" as an experimental track with the "deepest" lyrics on the album.

"Checkmate" is a rock song with JJ Lin. Sung in Korean, Mandarin Chinese, and English, the song portrays the theme that "we'd always be there for each other although our nationalities are different". In "Last Leaf", Jung describes the inner turmoil he faces through his work. "27 Years" is a reflection of Jung's life and the uncertainty of his career path, in which he reminisces of his childhood memories where "there was no such worries". "You, My Star" is an acoustic folk track. Dedicated to his fans, he expresses his gratitude for them through the lyrics.

== Artwork concept and packaging ==
"It's a simple image, a broken hearted man's dreamy rainbow tinted (as opposed to rose-tinted) gaze back to better times, helplessly watching his love falling ever further into the past, was it all just a dream? But the camera never lies and they do say the eyes are the windows to the Seoul."

— StormStudios newsletter on the special edition cover

One Fine Day was initially released in two editions: version A showcases Jung in a sunlit setting, while version B depicts him against a dark background. Conceptually, the album photos "express the pains of separating in opposite ways". Both versions are encased in a hard cover, which include an 80-page photobook, one of four possible random photo cards, and one poster. The artwork for the special edition of One Fine Day was designed by art collective StormStudios, its first time working with a South Korean musician. The designers originally planned to use the eye of a woman for the cover art, but were persuaded to use Jung's instead, under the basis that "such an intimate close up would make a paradoxically anonymous portrait shot". The cover shows a close-up of Jung's eye, with a falling girl shown in his pupil. Art director Dan Abbott explained that the cover art was influenced by the "great themes of loneliness, romance, and memories" explored on the album. It includes 14-page photobook and a poster.

Aru Suteki na Hi: Japan Special Edition was released in two editions: a Regular Edition that includes a 24-page photobook, and a Limited Edition with bonus DVD content that includes the music video and making movie for "Aru Suteki na Hi (Japanese ver.)". In Taiwan, all three Korean editions were released simultaneously: version A includes a large calendar poster; version B includes bonus DVD content that consists of the music videos for "One Fine Day" and "Checkmate", and behind-the-scenes footage; and the special edition includes a poster.

== Release and promotion ==
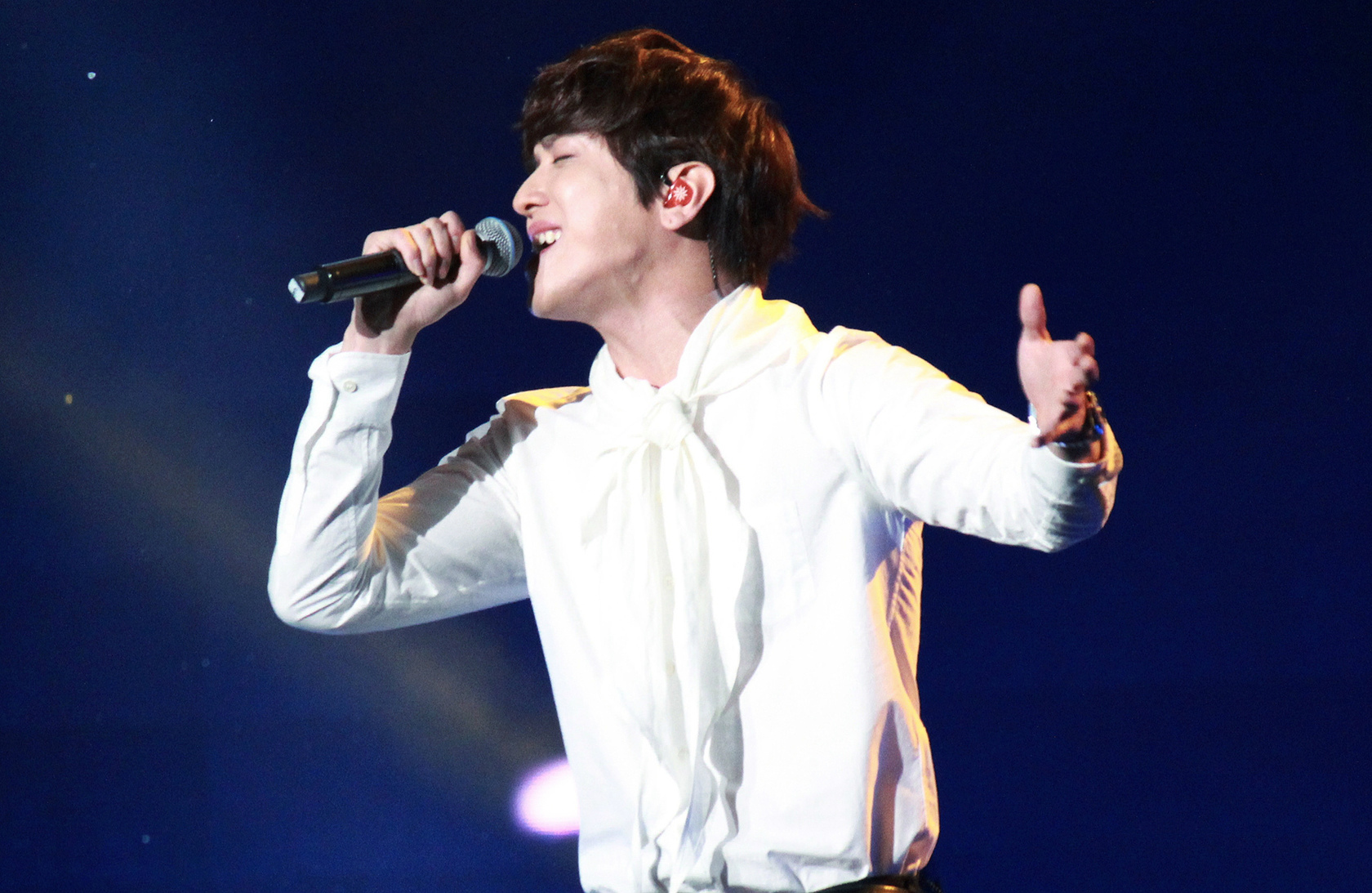
Jung at the 2015 Top Chinese Music Awards in Shenzhen

Jung first performed "You, My Star" at the SBS Gayo Daejeon on December 21, 2014. It was digitally released two days later, with full proceeds going towards FNC Entertainment's charity Love FNC. On January 6, 2015, FNC Entertainment's homepage was redesigned into a teaser website for Jung's album. Initiated on the following day, the four artists he collaborated with were revealed on an individual basis, beginning with hip hop musician and actor YDG. A music video teaser for "Mileage" was released on January 8, followed by the music video the day after. Continuing through January 11–13, the collaborations revealed were rapper Verbal Jint on "Energy", rock musician Yoon Do-hyun of YB on "Cruel Memories...", and Singaporean singer JJ Lin on "Checkmate", respectively. On the final day of the unveils, teaser photos for the album were also released. A highlight medley for the album was released on January 14. The music video teaser for "One Fine Day" was released on January 16. One day prior to the release of the album, Jung held a private showcase at the Maria Callas Hall in the Daechi-dong neighborhood of the Gangnam District in Seoul, South Korea.

One Fine Day and the music video for the title track were concurrently released on January 20. On January 22, Jung began promoting "One Fine Day" by performing the song on weekly music chart shows. In addition to the lead single, he also performed "Energy" with Verbal Jint on Mnet's music chart show M Countdown, "Checkmate" with JJ Lin on KBS's Music Bank, "Cruel Memories..." with Yoon Do-hyun on Munhwa Broadcasting Corporation's (MBC) Show! Music Core, and "Mileage" with YDG on Seoul Broadcasting System's (SBS) Inkigayo, Jung also performed on MBC Music's Show Champion. One the January 30 broadcast of Music Bank, two weeks into his solo debut, Jung earned his first music show win with "One Fine Day", followed by his second win on Inkigayo two days later. The song earned Jung his third win on Show Champion that same week Show Champion. He earned a second consecutive and final win on Music Bank the following week, bringing the total of music show wins up to four. Jung also appeared on SBS Power FM's Cultwo Show and KBS2's talk show You Hee-yeol's Sketchbook to promote his album. A music video for "Checkmate" with JJ Lin was released on January 30. Dedicated to his fans, Jung released music video for "You, My Star" on February 26.

A short version music video of the Japanese-language rendition of the single entitled "Aru Suteki na Hi" was released on February 5, followed by the full music video on February 27. On March 4, Jung released Aru Suteki na Hi: Japan Special Edition. Along with the aforementioned song, the album also includes the bonus track "Kimi wo Suki ni Natte Yokatta" with lyrics written by musician Takuro of rock band Glay. Jung performed at the Top Chinese Music Awards on April 13, where he earned the Media Recommended Overseas Artist Award for his solo effort.

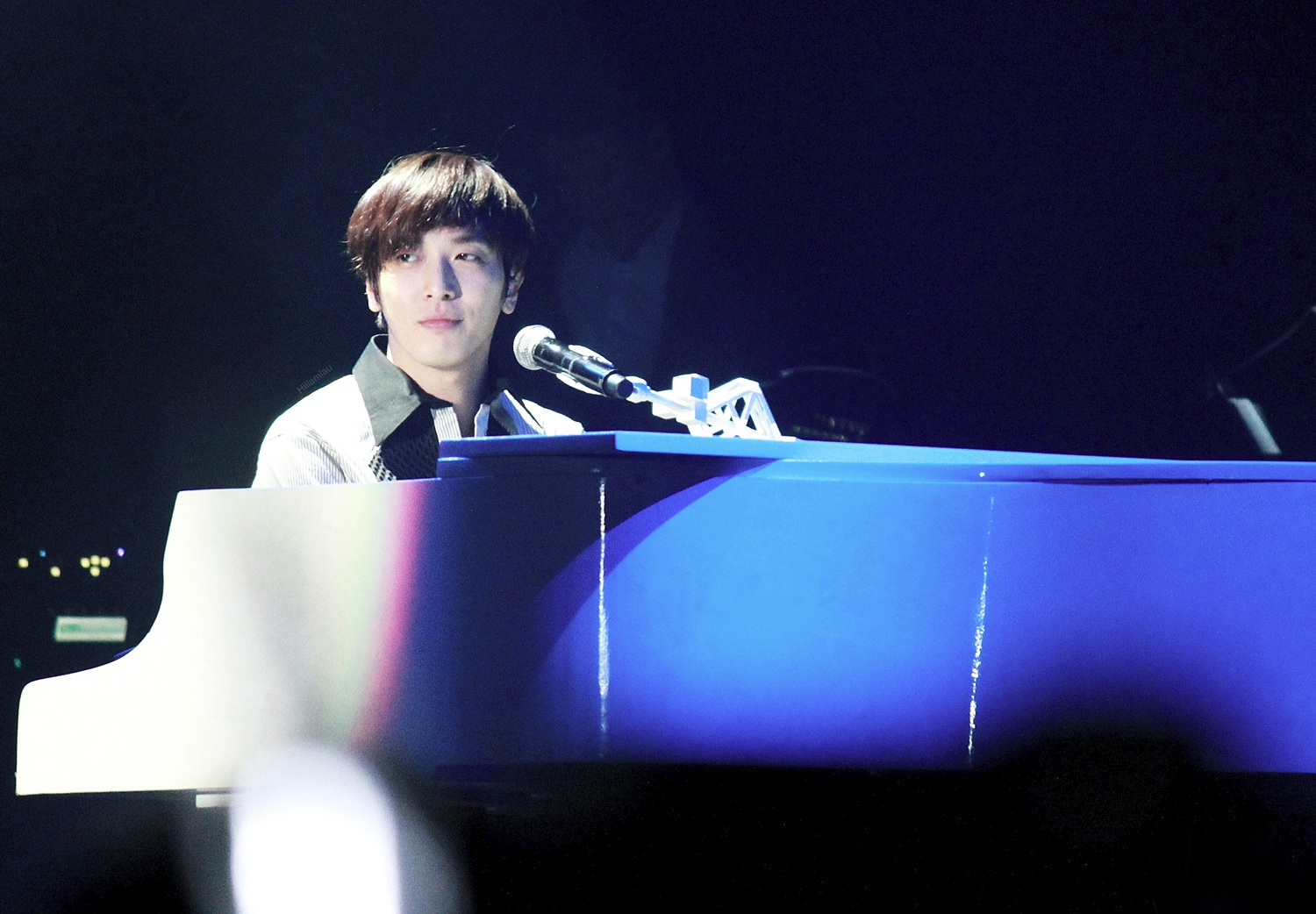
Jung at the One Fine Day concert in Hong Kong

Jung embarked on the 2015 Jung Yong-hwa Live <One Fine Day> tour, his first series of solo concerts. The first three concerts took place between February 27 through March 1 at the AX Hall in Gwangjang-dong, South Korea. Two concerts took place between March 7–8 at the International Forum in Tokyo, Japan, followed by two concerts between March 14–15 at the Grand Cube in Osaka, one concert on March 19 at the AsiaWorld–Expo in Hong Kong, one concert on March 22 at the Grand Stage in Shanghai, China, a second concert on March 28 at the Tokyo International Forum, one concert on April 4 at the Thunder Dome in Bangkok, Thailand, one concert on April 11 at the National Indoor Stadium in Beijing, one concert on May 30 at The Star Theatre in Singapore, one concert on June 20 at the TPEC Gymnasium in Taipei, Taiwan, and one concert on June 27 at the Tianhe Stadium in Guangzhou, China. Jung held an additional and final pair of concerts entitled 2015 Jung Yong-hwa Encore Concert: One More Fine Day from July 18–19 at the Olympic Hall in Olympic Park, Seoul, South Korea.

On June 24, Jung simultaneously released the Jung Yong-hwa 1st Concert in Japan "One Fine Day" Live at Budokan live album and the Jung Yong-hwa 1st Concert in Japan "One Fine Day" video album in DVD and Blu-ray formats. He also released the Jung Yong-hwa 1st Concert: One Fine Day live package on November 25. The set consists of a two-disc live video album in DVD format, a two-disc live album, and a 230-page photobook.

== Critical reception ==
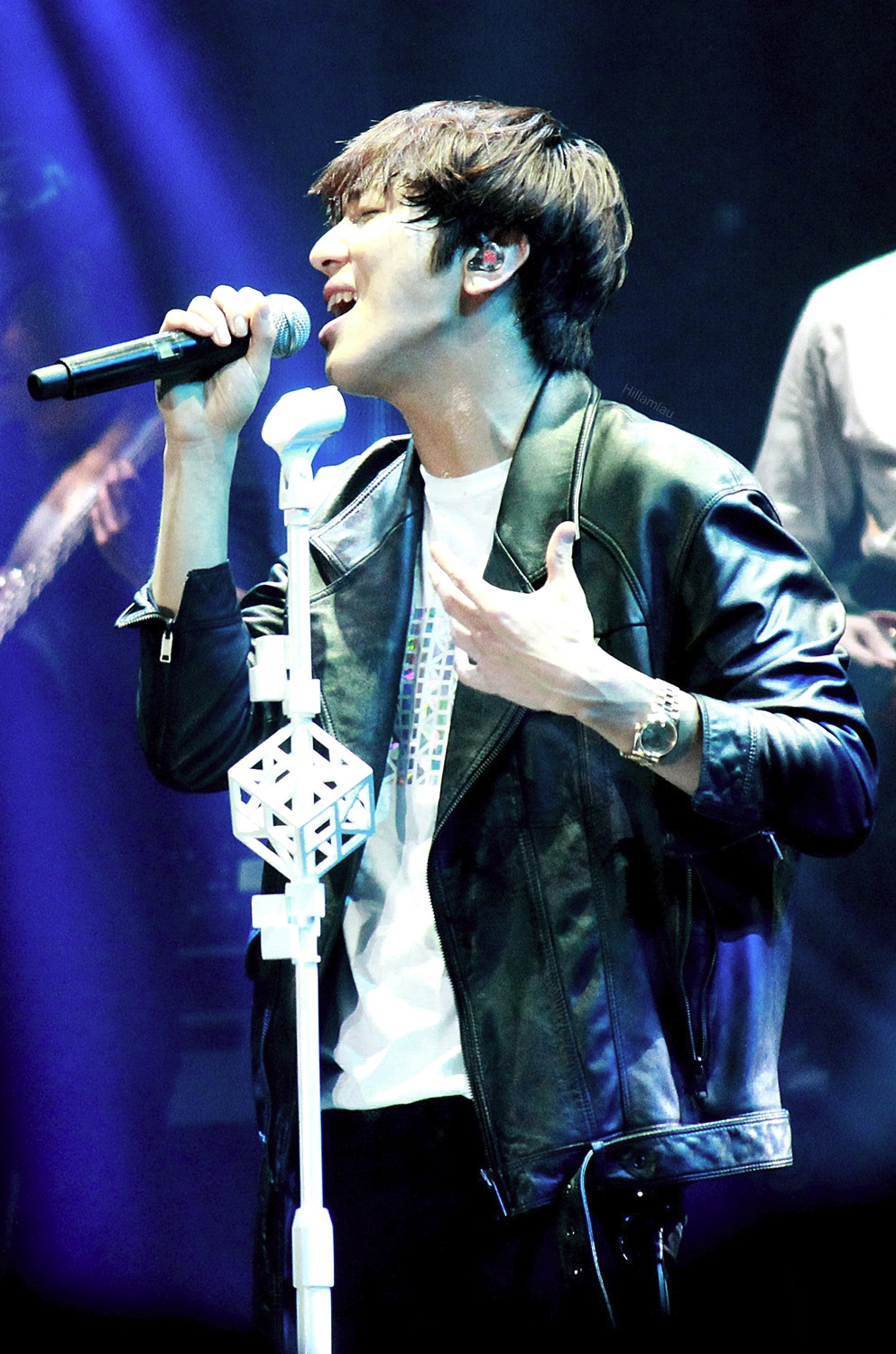
Jung at the One Fine Day concert in Hong Kong

One Fine Day received generally favorable reviews from music critics. Music critic Kim Young-dae stated that the lead single was "not fundamentally different from his previous works" with CNBLUE, but the other album tracks "attest to the fact that Jung Yong-hwa's songwriting capability has stepped up to a standard". He noted that Jung "organically amplifies the momentum" of his songs "without an obvious structural mechanism shows definite signs of growth". However, he also felt that Jung still faced shortcomings in his compositions, describing that the refrains to his songs "walk a thin line between the familiar and the predictable". He concluded that Jung reasonably demonstrated his "versatility as a melody maker". Writing for Singapore-based radio station MeRadio, Priscilla Wu rated the album four out of five stars and felt that the album exceeded expectations. She described the album as "largely easy on the ears", citing the familiarity between One Fine Day and the pop rock sound of CNBLUE. Noting both the lighter and heavier tracks within the album, Wu stated that Jung's "gentle but warm delivery creates the cohesiveness that gels the album together", which "competently reflects his talent as a singer-songwriter".

== Commercial performance ==
From the chart dated January 18–24, 2015, One Fine Day debuted at number one on the Gaon Album Chart. It fell to number two on the following week. By the end of the month, the album sold 75,886 copies in Korea, becoming the best selling album of January. Writing for the Gaon Music Chart, columnist Kim Jin-woo noted that One Fine Day contributed to the increase of CJ E&M's distribution of physical CDs in the top 100 from 19% to 33% that month, and concluded that Jung's album was "crucial to the hike in CJ E&M's market share". The album returned to the top of the chart on its third week. By the end of 2015, One Fine Day sold 115,203 copies in South Korea and ranked in number 17 on the year-end chart.

One Fine Day debuted at number one on Billboard magazine's World Albums Chart, making Jung the second South Korean male soloist to top the chart after Kim Jong-hyun did so with Base the week prior. In Japan, the album debuted at number 14 on the weekly Oricon Albums Chart, selling 5,236 copies in its first week. With the release of Aru Suteki na Hi: Japan Special Edition, the album re-entered the weekly Oricon Albums Chart at number four, selling 22,745 copies. It charted for 13 weeks and sold 40,212 copies in the country by the end of the year.

== Track listing ==
Standard track listing
| No. | Title | Lyrics | Music | Arrangement | Length |
|---|---|---|---|---|---|
| 1. | "Intro" | | Jung Yong-hwa, Two Face | Two Face | 0:42 |
| 2. | "One Fine Day" (어느 멋진 날; Eoneu Meotjin Nal) | Jung Yong-hwa | Jung Yong-hwa, Two Face | Two Face | 3:53 |
| 3. | "Cruel Memories..." (추억은 잔인하게...; Chueogeun Janinhage...) (with Yoon Do-hyun) | Jung Yong-hwa, Yoon Do-hyun | Jung Yong-hwa, Han Seul-pun, Go Jin-young | Jung Yong-hwa, Go Jin-young, Park Hyun-woo | 3:59 |
| 4. | "Energy" (원기옥; Wongiok) (with Verbal Jint) | Jung Yong-hwa, Verbal Jint | Jung Yong-hwa, Verbal Jint | Jung Yong-hwa, Verbal Jint | 3:38 |
| 5. | "Mileage" (마일리지; Mailliji) (with YDG) | Jung Yong-hwa, YDG | Jung Yong-hwa | Jung Yong-hwa, Go Jin-young | 4:04 |
| 6. | "Checkmate" (with JJ Lin) | Jung Yong-hwa, JJ Lin | Jung Yong-hwa | Jung Yong-hwa, Lee Sang-ho | 3:58 |
| 7. | "Without You" (니가 없어도; Niga Eobseodo) | Jung Yong-hwa | Jung Yong-hwa | Jung Yong-hwa, Han Seung-hun | 4:27 |
| 8. | "Last Leaf" ((마지막 잎새; Majimak Ipsae) | Jung Yong-hwa | Jung Yong-hwa, Go Jin-young, Park Hyun-woo | Jung Yong-hwa, Go Jin-young, Park Hyun-woo | 4:22 |
| 9. | "Goodnight Lover" | Jung Yong-hwa | Jung Yong-hwa | Jung Yong-hwa, Kim Jae-yang | 3:55 |
| 10. | "27 Years" (with Peter Malick) | Jung Yong-hwa, Peter Malick | Jung Yong-hwa, Peter Malick | Jung Yong-hwa, Peter Malick, Francis Sooho Kim | 3:37 |
| 11. | "You, My Star" (별, 그대; Byeol, Geudae) (hidden track, CD-only) | Jung Yong-hwa | Jung Yong-hwa, Han Seung-hoon, Go Jin-young | Go Jin-young | 3:34 |
| Total length: | | | | | 40:09 |

Aru Suteki na Hi: Japan Special Edition
| No. | Title | Lyrics | Music | Arrangement | Length |
|---|---|---|---|---|---|
| 1. | "Intro" | | Jung Yong-hwa, Two Face | Two Face | 0:42 |
| 2. | "Aru Suteki na Hi (ある素敵な日; One Fine Day)" (Japanese ver.) | Jung Yong-hwa | Jung Yong-hwa, Two Face | Two Face | 3:53 |
| 3. | "Omoide wa Zankoku ni... (想い出は残酷に...; Memories Are Cruel...)" (with Yoon Do-hyun) | Jung Yong-hwa, Yoon Do-hyun | Jung Yong-hwa, Han Seul-pun, Go Jin-young | Jung Yong-hwa, Go Jin-young, Park Hyun-woo | 3:59 |
| 4. | "Genkidama (元気玉; Energy Balls)" (with Verbal Jint) | Jung Yong-hwa, Verbal Jint | Jung Yong-hwa, Verbal Jint | Jung Yong-hwa, Verbal Jint | 3:38 |
| 5. | "Mileage" (with YDG) | Jung Yong-hwa, YDG | Jung Yong-hwa | Jung Yong-hwa, Go Jin-young | 4:04 |
| 6. | "Checkmate" (with JJ Lin) | Jung Yong-hwa, JJ Lin | Jung Yong-hwa | Jung Yong-hwa, Lee Sang-ho | 3:58 |
| 7. | "Anata ga Inakute mo (あなたがいなくても; Even Without You)" | Jung Yong-hwa | Jung Yong-hwa | Jung Yong-hwa, Han Seung-hun | 4:27 |
| 8. | "Last Leaf" | Jung Yong-hwa | Jung Yong-hwa, Go Jin-young, Park Hyun-woo | Jung Yong-hwa, Go Jin-young, Park Hyun-woo | 4:22 |
| 9. | "Goodnight Lover" | Jung Yong-hwa | Jung Yong-hwa | Jung Yong-hwa, Kim Jae-yang | 3:55 |
| 10. | "27 Years" (with Peter Malick) | Jung Yong-hwa, Peter Malick | Jung Yong-hwa, Peter Malick | Jung Yong-hwa, Peter Malick, Francis Sooho Kim | 3:37 |
| 11. | "Kimi wo Suki ni Natte Yokatta (君を好きになってよかった; I'm Glad I Came to Like You)" | Takuro | Jung Yong-hwa | | 4:15 |
| Total length: | | | | | 40:50 |

Aru Suteki na Hi: Japan Special Edition Limited Edition — bonus DVD content
| No. | Title | Length |
|---|---|---|
| 1. | "Aru Suteki na Hi (ある素敵な日; One Fine Day)" (music video) |
| 2. | "Aru Suteki na Hi (ある素敵な日; One Fine Day)" (making movie) |

One Fine Day Taiwanese version B — bonus DVD content
| No. | Title | Length |
|---|---|---|
| 1. | "One Fine Day" (music video) |
| 2. | "Checkmate" (music video) |
| 3. | "Image Teaser 1" |
| 4. | "Image Teaser 2" |
| 5. | "One Fine Day" (music video teaser) |
| 6. | "One Fine Day" (music video behind-the-scenes) |
| 7. | "One Fine Day" (music video (lip version)) |
| 8. | "Album Jacket Behind-the-Scenes" |

== Credits and personnel ==
Credits adapted from the album's liner notes.

- Jung Yong-hwa – record producer, composer, lyricist, arranger, chorus
- JJ Lin – lyricist, chorus, recording engineer
- Peter Malick – composer, lyricist, arranger
- Verbal Jint – composer, lyricist, arranger, strings, piano
- YDG – lyricist
- Yoon Do-hyun – lyricist
- Baek Gyeong-hun – recording engineer
- Choi Hoon – bass
- Choi Hyo-yeong – mastering engineer
- Go Jin-young – composer, arranger, bass
- Go Seung-wook – mixing engineer
- Ha Hyeong-ju – drums
- Han Seong-ho – executive producer
- Han Seung-hoon – producer, composer, arranger, piano
- Hong Jang-hyeon – photography
- Jang Dong-jin – drums
- Jeon Geun-hwa – chorus
- Jo Jun-seong – mixing engineer
- Jo Seong-wan – supervisor
- Jung Jae-pil – guitar
- Jung Su-wan – guitar
- Kang Su-ho – drums
- Kang Tae-woo – chorus
- Kim Byeong-seok – bass
- Francis Sooho Kim – arranger
- Kim Jae-yang – producer, arranger, piano
- Kim Se-yong – making photography
- Kwon Woo-mi – A&R
- Lee Sang-ho – arranger
- Lee Tae-wook – guitar
- Lee Yu-jin – recording engineer, mixing engineer
- MasterKey – mixing engineer, mastering engineer
- Oh Seong-geun – recording engineer
- Park Hyun-woo – composer, guitar
- Park In-yeong – string arranger
- Park Jeong-min – recording engineer
- Park Jin-se – recording engineer
- Seong Ji-hun – mastering engineer
- Two Face – composer, arranger, piano
- Uncle Jo – mixing engineer
- Yeo Jin-su – recording engineer
- Yoong String – strings

== Charts ==
=== Weekly ===
| Chart (2015) | Peak position |
|---|---|
| Billboard World Albums Chart | 1 |
| Gaon Album Chart | 1 |
| Oricon Albums Chart | 4 |

=== Year-end ===
| Chart (2015) | Position |
|---|---|
| Gaon Album Chart | 17 |

== Release history ==
List of release dates, showing region, edition, formats, label, and reference
| Region | Date | Edition(s) | Format(s) | Label | Ref. |
|---|---|---|---|---|---|
| South Korea | January 20, 2015 | Version A; version B | CD | FNC; CJ E&M | |
| Various | January 20, 2015 | Standard | Digital download | FNC; CJ E&M | |
| South Korea | February 5, 2015 | Special edition | CD | FNC; CJ E&M | |
| Japan | March 4, 2015 | Special edition; limited edition | CD; digital download | Warner Music Japan | |
| Taiwan | March 13, 2015 | Version A; version B; special edition | CD | Warner Music Taiwan | |
