= Jung Yong-hwa =

South Korean singer and actor (born 1989)

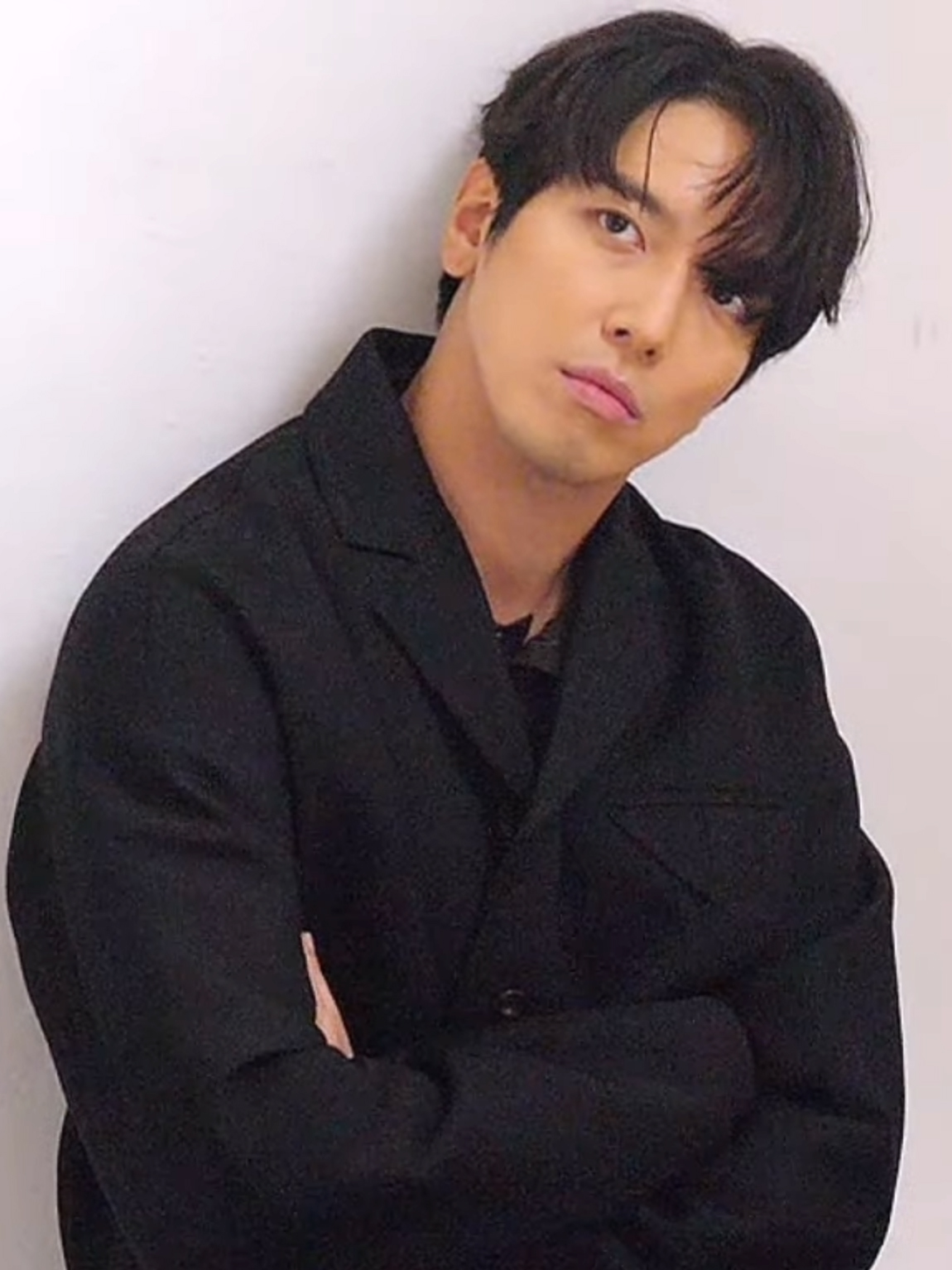
- Jung in 2020
- Born: June 22, 1989 (age 37); Seoul, South Korea
- Occupations: Singer; musician; actor; songwriter; rapper
- Musical career
- Genres: Rock; R&B; pop; jazz
- Instruments: Vocals; guitar
- Years active: 2009–present
- Label: FNC
- Member of: CNBLUE
- Website: fncent.com/jungyonghwa

Korean name
- Hangul: 정용화
- Hanja: 鄭容和
- RR: Jeong Yonghwa
- MR: Chŏng Yonghwa

Jung Yong-hwa (Korean: 정용화; pronounced [tɕəːŋ joŋ hwa]; born June 22, 1989), also known mononymously as Yonghwa, is a South Korean singer, musician and actor. He is the leader, lead vocalist and rhythm guitarist of the rock band CNBLUE. Jung made his television debut in You're Beautiful (2009), and has since starred in television dramas Heartstrings (2011), Marry Him If You Dare (2013), The Three Musketeers (2014), The Package (2017), Sell Your Haunted House (2021) and Brainworks (2023). On the music front, Jung also made his solo debut with the album One Fine Day in 2015.

== Early life and career beginnings ==
Jung Yong-hwa was born on June 22, 1989, in Seoul, South Korea. His family consists of his parents and a brother, who is four years older. He moved to Busan in 1991 and lived there through high school, where he first began composing music. The group debuted in Japan with the EP Now or Never on August 19, 2009, with an indie label AI Entertainment. They debuted in Korea in 2010 with the EP Bluetory.

== Music career ==
On January 14, 2011, Jung released his first solo digital single, "For First Time Lovers". The song was featured on the second season of We Got Married, where Jung was a cast member and one half of an on-screen couple with Seohyun of Girls' Generation. Upon its release, it topped various South Korean music charts.

In 2014, he released "You, My Star", a self-composed single dedicated to his fans. All profits of the single were donated to charity.

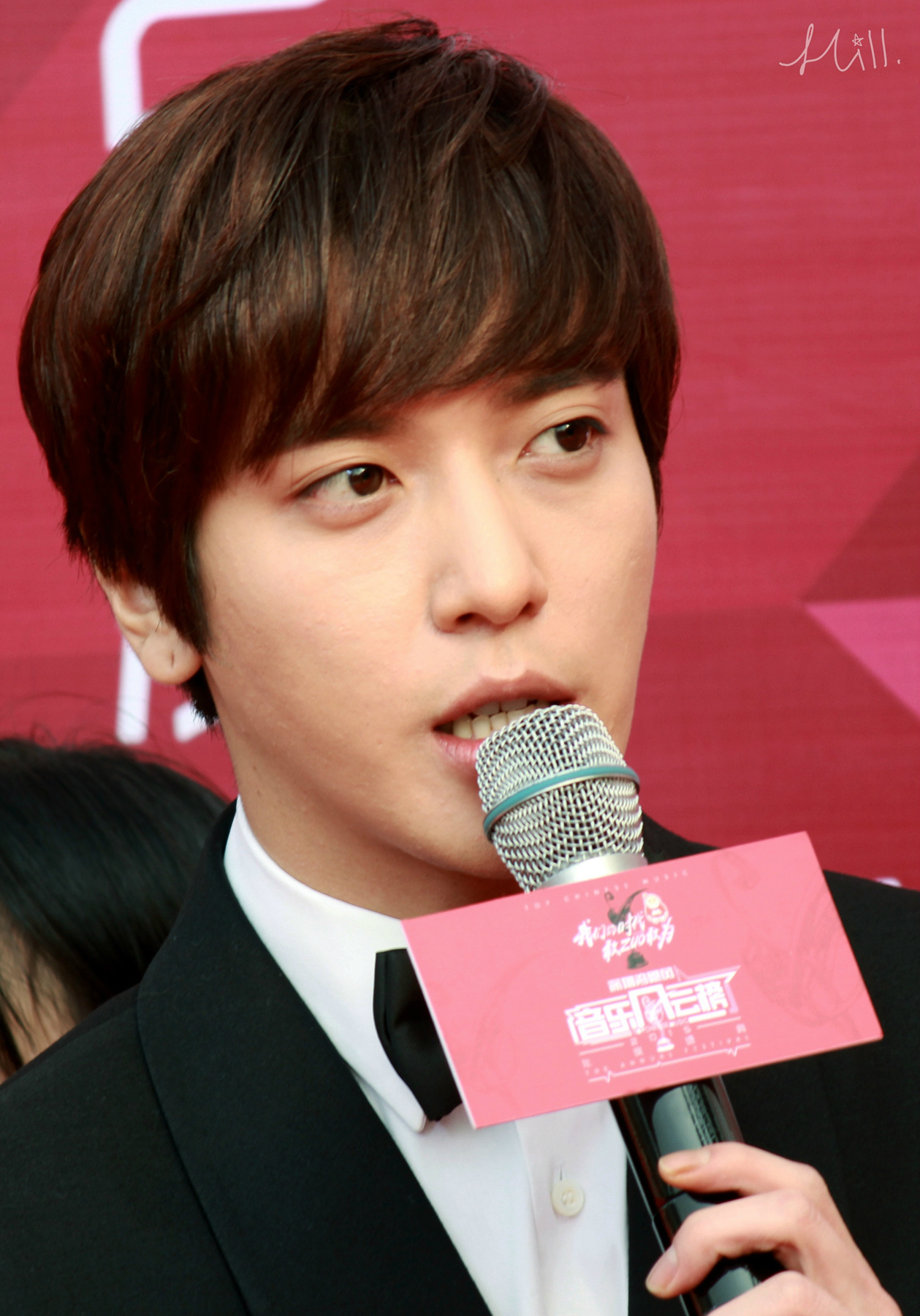
Jung on the red carpet at the 15th Yinyue Fengyun Bang Awards on April 13, 2015

In January 2015, Jung debuted as a solo artist with the album One Fine Day, which clinched the number one spot on the Billboard World Albums chart. The album featured artists JJ Lin, Yang Dong-geun, Verbal Jint, YB's Yoon Do-hyun and Peter Malick. One Fine Day received generally favorable reviews from music critics, who noted his growth as a singer-songwriter. Jung later embarked on his first series of solo concerts across Asia.

In 2016, Jung collaborated with Sunwoo Jung-a on a collaborative album project. The duo released two singles "Hello" and "Empathy"; Jung composed "Hello" and co-wrote the lyrics to "Empathy".

Jung reportedly collaborated with foreign artists through a songwriting camp for his first EP, titled Do Disturb. The EP along with the music video for its lead single "That Girl" were released on July 19, 2017. Jung released his second Japanese album Summer Calling on August 9, 2017.

=== Songwriting ===
Jung has composed several notable singles for CNBLUE, including "In My Head" (2011), "Where You Are" (2012) and "I'm Sorry" (2013). In particular, his composition "Can't Stop" for the group's fifth EP was very well received and earned rave reviews from critics and K-pop fans.

For his drama Heartstrings (2011), he composed and sang "Because I Miss You". The single peaked at number 14 on the Gaon Chart, and later ranked number one on Japanese ringtone charts. He also produced "Casting Love" for the soundtrack of Marry Him If You Dare (2013), which was sung by Jeon Gun-hwa.

Jung has also composed for other artists. He composed and produced "Fool" (also known as "Babo") as a gift for label-mate Juniel, which was featured on her debut album as well as "Love is Only You" for another FNC artist, girl group AOA. Jung released 17 compositions for the first half of 2012.

As a gift for the CNBLUE School in Burkina Faso, Africa, Jung helped produce their "School Song". In 2013, Jung penned the song "Feel Good", the brand song of Samsung Galaxy, which was released on YouTube on August 23, 2013.

In January 2019, Jung was among 25 songwriters selected for the forthcoming year to become full members of the Korea Music Copyright Association (KOMCA).

== Acting career ==
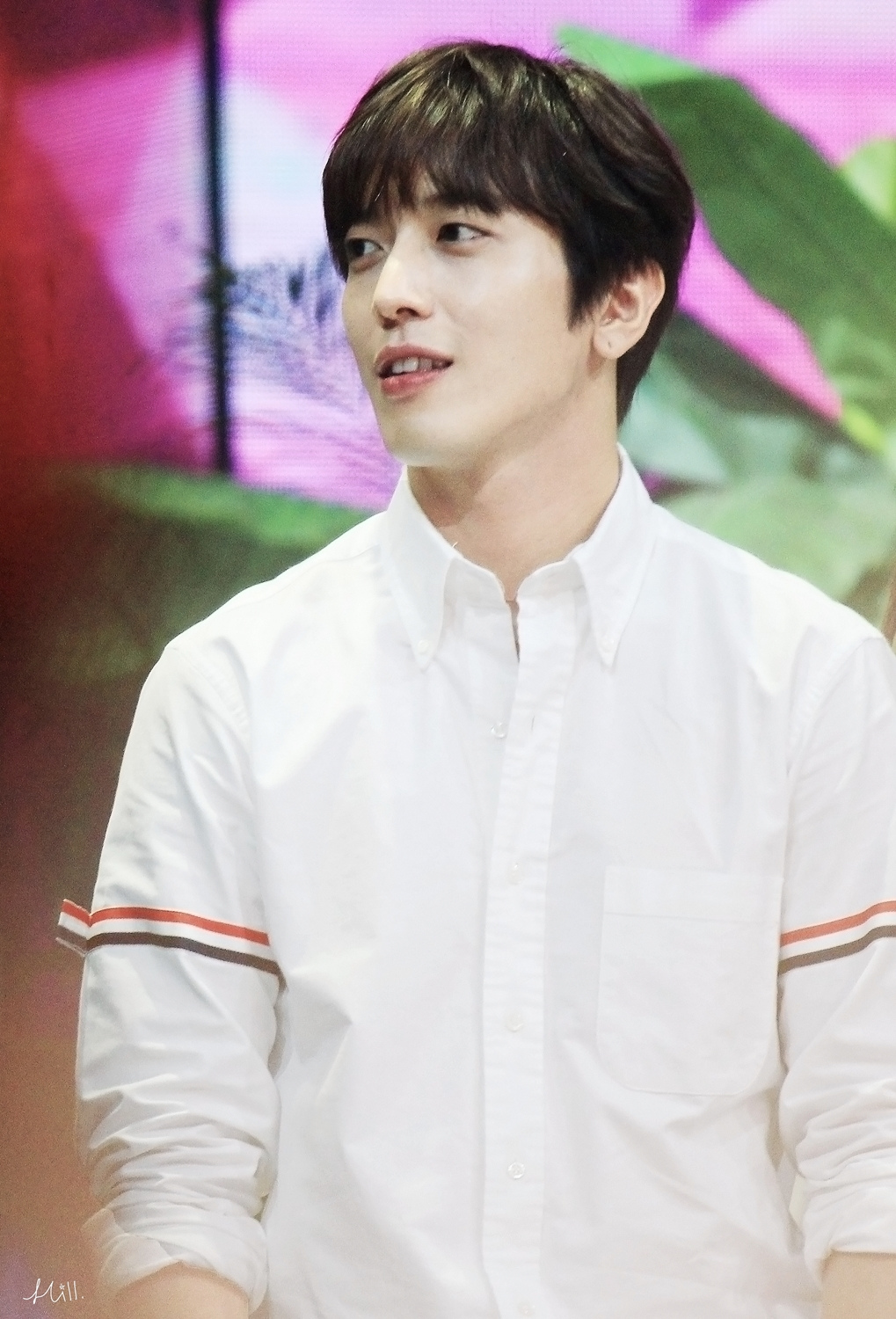
Jung filming Happy Camp in China, 2015

Jung Yong-hwa debuted as an actor before his band's debut in Korea. He was the first member of CNBLUE to appear on screen in 2009 when he landed his first acting role in the SBS drama You're Beautiful. The drama aired from October 7 to November 26, 2009. As the series revolves around the life of a musical group, he played the role of the lead guitarist in the faux idol band A.N.Jell. The series gained a cult following, and earned high ratings in Japan, which fostered the growth of his popularity.

In 2011, Jung was cast in MBC's youth campus drama Heartstrings, along with fellow band member Kang Min-hyuk. The drama also reunited Jung with You're Beautiful co-star Park Shin-hye. After the drama aired, Jung experienced a rise in popularity in Japan.

In 2013, Jung starred in the KBS' romantic comedy Marry Him If You Dare.

In 2014, Jung took the leading role in period action drama The Three Musketeers. Despite suffering from low ratings, Jung received positive reviews from critics and producers for his improved acting in the series. Three Musketeers was also well received in China and fostered in Jung's growth in popularity in the country.

In 2017, Jung made his big-screen debut in the Chinese gastronomy film Cook Up a Storm alongside Nicholas Tse. The same year, Jung starred in JTBC's travel romance drama The Package with Lee Yeon-hee.

In 2020, Jung made a special appearance in the sci-fi film, P1H: The Beginning of a New World, following his military discharge in late 2019.

In 2021, Jung starred in the comedy and fantasy drama, Sell Your Haunted House alongside Jang Na-ra. He sang the first OST of the series, "I Got Ya".

=== Television shows ===
After his successful acting debut, Jung joined his first variety show, MBC's Sunday Sunday Night program Korea Ecosystem Rescue Centre: Hunters, which featured seven celebrity MCs going out to capture wild boars. The show premiered on December 6, 2009, but was forced to prematurely cease its run in mid-January 2010 due to protests by animal-rights groups. He subsequently continued as one of the MCs on the replacement program Eco House, which deals with global climate change.

In 2010, Jung became one of the hosts of SBS' live music show Inkigayo and variety-talk show Night After Night. He left both programs in 2011.

In February 2010, he was paired with Seohyun of Girls' Generation as part of a virtually wedded couple for the second season of MBC's We Got Married. Collectively known as "YongSeo" couple, they filmed their final episode of the show on March 15, 2011. At the end of the year, Jung won the "Popularity Award" at the MBC Entertainment Awards for his stint in We Got Married.

In 2018, Jung joined the talk show Talk Mon alongside Kang Ho-dong as a host. However, he shortly left the program soon after he was involved in a controversy.

In 2020, Jung hosted the first season of the reality program, K-Trot in Town with Boom. The show aimed to introduce the genre of Korean Trot to people from other countries. However, due to the COVID-19 pandemic, the latter episodes focused on online busking events.

== Personal life ==
=== Philanthropy ===
Jung has actively participated in charity events in the previous years including in the event held by BC Card in Seoul last May 2015.

He has released a song called "You, My Star" on December 23, 2013, dedicated to his fans. All the proceeds from this song have been donated to the FNC charity, Love FNC.

In December 2017, it has been reported that Jung has taken part in a public campaign for children with hearing disabilities run by Audiology Development Foundation in China. This campaign will help pay for the costs of education and other needs of children with hearing disabilities.

Jung held a two-day concert in March 2018 before he enlisted. All the profits in the said event will be donated.

He donated 50 million won to the Miral Welfare Foundation to celebrate this year's International Day of Disabled Persons on December 3. He requested that the donation will be used for the medical and living expenses of disabled children from low-income families.

He established a scholarship program at his alma mater, Namsan High School in Busan. He attended the graduation ceremony held on February 12, 2019, awarding six scholarships to selected graduates. He also donated to the school's development and will continuously do so.

Jung donated 20 million won for the victims of forest fires Gangwon Province through Hope Bridge National Disaster Relief Association. According to the organization, the donation will be used for the recovery of the damaged areas in Gangwon Province and support for the victims.

=== Controversy ===
On June 28, 2016, it was reported that Jung is being under investigation for insider trading. He was reportedly being investigated for allegedly earning approximately $347,000 through buying stocks in FNC Entertainment after learning about their plans to sign a major celebrity. On June 30, Jung was cleared of suspicion and was found not guilty. On October 31, FNC Entertainment announced that they would take legal action against malicious rumors about the singer after being framed of insider trading.

On January 17, 2018, Jung was reported to have entered a Kyung Hee University graduate school program, despite failing to appear at two official interviews for graduate school entrance. It was later revealed that he attended the interview separately at his agency FNC Entertainment at the request of the professor in charge of student admission. Due to the controversy, Jung's admission was set to be revoked by Kyung Hee University despite having not broken any rules as the university itself has no clear rules regarding graduate student admission process, and that it's often up to the professor's discretion. Citizens' Coalition for Democratic Media (CCDM) issued a press release criticizing SBS for targeting Jung in their report, calling it "exploitative" and "extremely inappropriate reporting by the media that runs the serious risk of human rights violations."

On October 9, 2018, FNC Entertainment announced that Jung had been cleared of all charges earlier that year. It was reported that Jung was not guilty of obstruction of business in regards to his school admissions. The prosecutor decided to not indict him in July. The law also acknowledged that Jung did not have any intention of receiving preferential admission.

=== Military service ===
Jung began his compulsory military service on March 5, 2018. He volunteered to be assigned in the 702nd Special Assault Regiment in II Corps on April 13, 2018. Jung was discharged from his military service on November 3, 2019.

== Filmography ==
=== Film ===
Year	Title	Role	Notes	Ref.
2017	Cook Up a Storm	Chef Ahn Paul		
2020	P1H: The Beginning of a New World	Han	Special appearance	
TBA	The Regular Restaurant	Ki-yong		

=== Television series ===
Year	Title	Role	Notes	Ref.
2009	You're Beautiful	Kang Shin-woo		
2011	Heartstrings	Lee Shin		
2012	A Gentleman's Dignity	Himself	Cameo (Episode 13)	
2013	Marry Him If You Dare	Park Se-joo		
2014	The Three Musketeers	Park Dal-hyang		
2017	The Package	San Ma-roo		
2021	Sell Your Haunted House	Oh In-beom		
2023	Brain Works	Shin Ha-ru		
2026	Oh! My Guard	Um Tae-bong		

=== Television shows ===
Year	Title	Role	Notes	Ref.
2009–2010	Korea Ecosystem Rescue Centre: Hunters	Main cast		
2010	Eco House	Main cast		
2010–2011	We Got Married	Main cast	with Seohyun	
2010–2011	Inkigayo	Host	with Sulli and Jo Kwon	
2010–2011	Night After Night	Host	with Daesung, Uee, etc.	
2015	Hologram	Himself	Solo debut reality show	
2017	Island Trio	Cast member		
2017	Syndrome Man	Cast member		
2018	Talkmon	Host	with Kang Ho-dong	
2020	K-Trot in Town	MC	with Boom	
2021	My Little Old Boy	Special Host		
2023	Mr. House Husband	Cast Member	Season 2	
2026	My Remaining Love (working title)	Cast Member	with DK and Choi Ye-na	

=== Hosting ===
Year	Title	Notes	Ref.
2009	SBS Gayo Daejeon	with Heechul and Park Shin-hye	
2010	SBS TV's 20th Anniversary Love Sharing Concert	with Jo Kwon and Lim Yoona	
2010	SBS Gayo Daejeon	with Heechul, Jo Kwon, and Hwang Jung-eum	
2012	SBS K-Pop Super Concert	with Tiffany Young and Lee Gi-kwang	
2012	Music Bank in Chile	with Cho Kyu-hyun and Uee	
2012	KBS Song Festival	with Lim Yoona and Sung Si-kyung	
2013	27th Golden Disc Awards	with Nicole Jung	
2014	28th Golden Disc Awards	with Minho and Yoon Doo-joon	
2014	SBS Gayo Daejeon	with Nichkhun, Mino, Baro, L, and Song Ji-hyo	
2015	MBC Gayo Daejejeon		
2017	31st Golden Disc Awards	with Seohyun and Hwang Chi-yeul	
2022	2022 KBS Drama Awards	with Lee Hye-ri and Jun Hyun-moo	
2024	KCON Japan		

=== Radio shows ===
Year	Title	Role	Note	Ref.
2021	Beautiful Morning This is Kim Chang-wan	Special DJ	August 12	

== Discography ==
Studio albums

- One Fine Day (2015)
- Summer Calling (2017)
- Feel the Y's City (2020)
- Your City (2023)

== Concert tours ==
=== Solo Concert ===
- Jung Yonghwa 1st Concert – One Fine Day (2015)
- Jung Yonghwa Live [Summer Calling] (2017)
- Jung Yonghwa Live [Room 622] (2018)
- Jung Yong Hwa Live "Still 622" in Seoul (2019)
- Jung Yong Hwa Japan Concert 2020 'Welcome to the Y's City (2022)
- Jung Yong Hwa Japan Concert @X-Mas ~Welcome to the Y's City~ (2022)
- Jung Yong Hwa Live 'All-Rounder' (2023)
- Jung Yong Hwa Live "Your City" (2023)
- Jung Yong Hwa Live "D-Free" (2024)

=== Concert participation ===
- 2019 FNC Kingdom -Winter Forest Camp- (2019)
- 2022 FNC Kingdom -Star Station- (2022)
- 2023 FNC Kingdom -The Greatest Show- (2023)
- 2024 KCON Japan (2024)

== Awards and nominations ==
Name of the award ceremony, year presented, category, nominee of the award, and the result of the nomination
Award ceremony	Year	Category	Nominee / Work	Result	Ref.
APAN Star Awards	2012	Hallyu Star Award	Heartstrings	Won	
Baeksang Arts Awards	2012	Most Popular Actor (TV)	Heartstrings	Nominated	
Baeksang Arts Awards	2014	Most Popular Actor (TV)	Jung Yong-hwa	Nominated	
Elle China Style Awards	2015	Voice of Elle International Singer of the Year	Jung Yong-hwa	Won	
Golden Disc Awards	2016	Best Solo Vocal Award	One Fine Day	Won	
Golden Disc Awards	2018	Golden Disc Album Award	Do Disturb	Nominated	
Golden Disc Awards	2018	Global Popular Artist Award	Jung Yong-hwa	Nominated	
Hito Music Awards	2026	Best International Creator	Jung Yong-hwa	Won	
Hong Kong Weibo Star Awards	2015	Hottest Korean Artist Award	Jung Yong-hwa	Won	
Hong Kong Weibo Star Awards	2015	Most Influential Korean Star	Jung Yong-hwa	Won	
KBS Drama Awards	2013	Best Couple Award (with Han Chae-ah)	Marry Him If You Dare	Nominated	
KBS Drama Awards	2021	Top Excellence Award, Actor	Sell Your Haunted House	Nominated	
KBS Drama Awards	2021	Excellence Award, Actor in a Miniseries	Sell Your Haunted House	Won	
Korea Drama Awards	2010	Popularity Award	You're Beautiful	Won	
MBC Drama Awards	2011	Best New Actor	Heartstrings	Nominated	
MBC Entertainment Awards	2010	Popularity Award	Jung Yong-hwa	Won	
MBC Entertainment Awards	2010	Most Popular Couple (shared with Seohyun)	We Got Married	Won	
Melon Music Awards	2011	Music Style Best OST Song	"You've Fallen For Me" (Heartstrings)	Nominated	
Melon Music Awards	2015	Music Style Best Folk Song	"Star, You"	Nominated	
Mnet Asian Music Awards	2015	Best Male Solo	One Fine Day	Nominated	
Mnet Asian Music Awards	2015	Artist of the Year	Jung Yong-hwa	Nominated	
SBS Drama Awards	2009	New Star Award	You're Beautiful	Won	
SBS Entertainment Awards	2010	Best Newcomer in a Variety Show	Inkigayo and Night After Night	Won	
Seoul Music Awards	2016	Bonsang	One Fine Day	Nominated	
Seoul Music Awards	2016	Popularity Award	Jung Yong-hwa	Nominated	
Top Chinese Music Awards	2015	Solo Artist Award	Jung Yong-hwa	Won	
