= Han So-hee =

South Korean actress (born 1993)

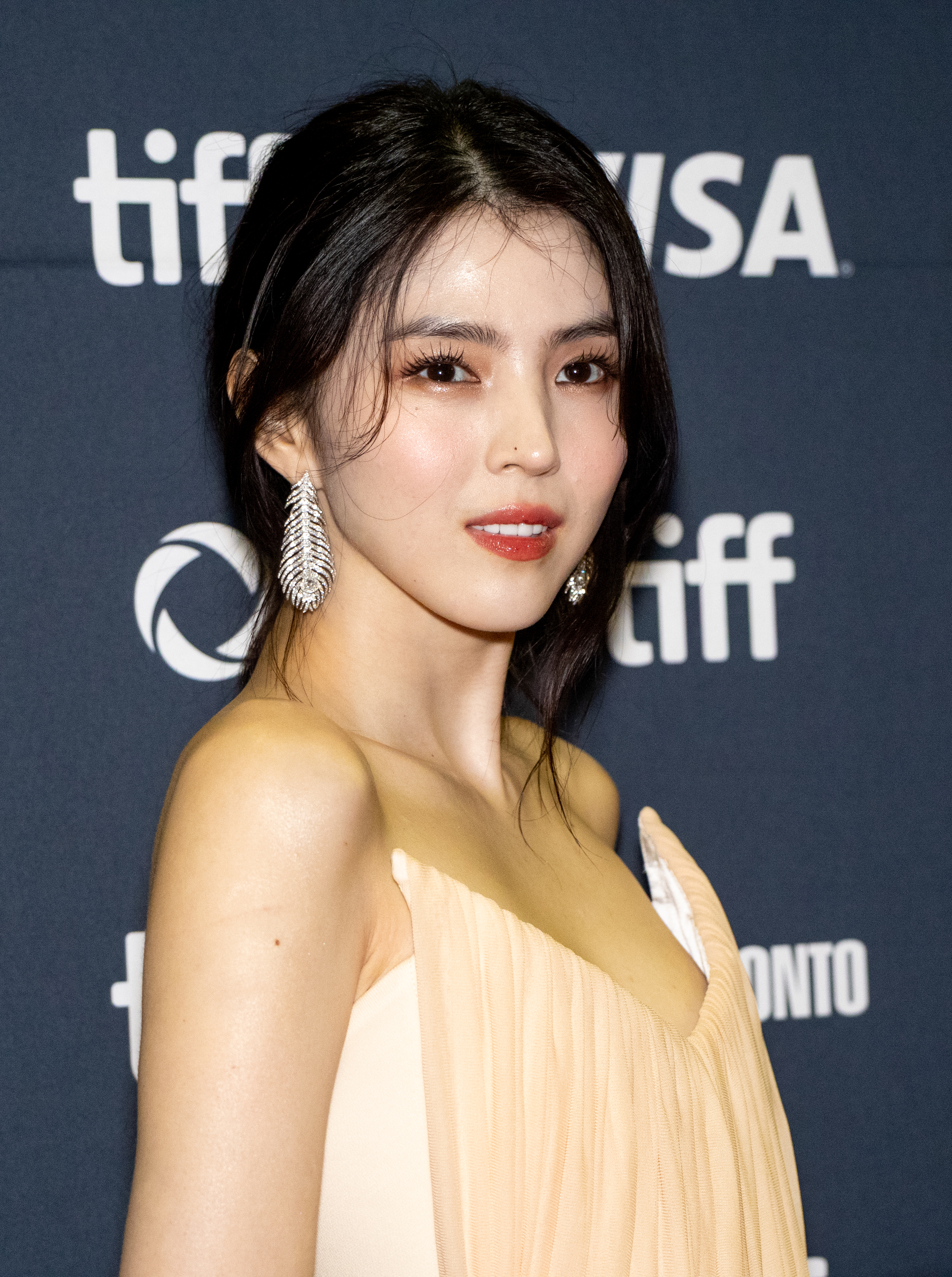
- Han in 2025
- Born: Lee So-hee; November 18, 1993 (age 33); Ulsan, South Korea
- Education: Ulsan High School of Arts
- Occupations: Actress; model
- Years active: 2016–present
- Agent: 9ato Entertainment

Korean name
- Hangul: 이소희
- RR: I Sohui
- MR: I Sohŭi

Stage name
- Hangul: 한소희
- RR: Han Sohui
- MR: Han Sohŭi

Signature
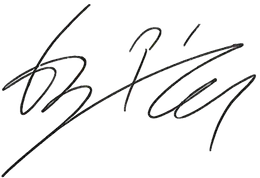

Lee So-hee (Korean: 이소희; born November 18, 1993), better known by the stage name Han So-hee (한소희), is a South Korean actress and model. She began her career as a supporting character in the television series Money Flower (2017), 100 Days My Prince (2018), and Abyss (2019) before transitioning into lead roles in The World of the Married (2020), Nevertheless (2021), My Name (2021), and Gyeongseong Creature (2023–2024).

== Early life ==
Han was born as Lee So-hee on November 18, 1993, in Ulsan, South Korea. She attended Ulsan High School of Arts where she majored in arts. In her senior year of high school, Han moved to Seoul to live with her grandmother, where she worked various part-time jobs to make ends meet. Han originally had no plans of entering the entertainment industry and wanted to continue pursuing higher education, stating that, "I got into a university in France, but I couldn't go because I didn't have enough money in my bank account. I had to have at least ₩60 million (approximately US$46,000) in my bank account to get a visa. I didn't have that, of course". While working part-time at pubs, modelling, and filming commercials to save up money, the head of the agency to which she belonged persuaded Han to try acting.

== Career ==
=== 2017–2019: Career beginnings ===
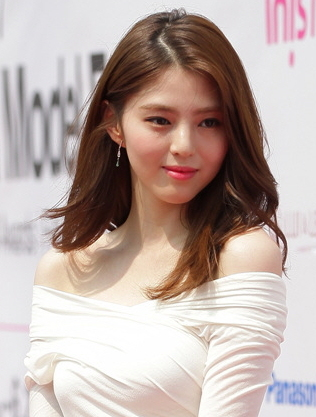
Han in June 2017

Han appeared in SHINee's "Tell Me What To Do" music video in 2016. She made her acting debut in a minor role in Reunited Worlds (2017). She got her first main roles in MBC TV's Money Flower in 2017 and tvN's 100 Days My Prince in 2018. Later in 2018, she starred in KBS2's After The Rain and made an appearance in Roy Kim's "The Hardest Part". In 2019, Han played a supporting role in the tvN series Abyss, alongside lead actors Ahn Hyo-seop and Park Bo-young.

=== 2020: Breakthrough ===
In 2020, Han starred in JTBC's The World of the Married alongside Kim Hee-ae and Park Hae-joon in which she played a main role as Yeo Da-kyung, a young mistress. The television series ended its run as the highest-rated television series in Korean cable television history. Han received widespread recognition thanks to the success of the television series. For her performance she was nominated for Best New Actress – Television at the 56th Baeksang Arts Awards.

=== 2021–present: Leading roles ===
In 2021, Han starred in JTBC romance drama Nevertheless alongside Song Kang. Later the same year, she starred in the Netflix original crime-action drama My Name as a woman seeking revenge for her father's murder. For her performance in My Name, she was nominated for Best Actress – Television at the 58th Baeksang Arts Awards.

In March 2022, Han appeared in the four-episode Disney+ mini-series Soundtrack#1 alongside Park Hyung-sik. In September, she appeared as Princess Kayena in a live-action teaser for the Kakao Webtoon series The Villainess is a Marionette. The following year, she featured in BTS' Jungkook music video for his single "Seven", which was released on July 14, 2023. In 2023, Han co-starred with Park Seo-joon in the 1945 historical drama Gyeongseong Creature, which aired on Netflix.

In 2025, Han starred as Mi-sun in the neo-noir heist film Project Y alongside Jeon Jong-seo, which premiered at the Toronto International Film Festival on September 10, 2025, and was theatrically released on January 21, 2026. On May 27, 2026, she appeared in the music video for K-pop group Xlov's single "SERVE", the title track of their second mini-album "I,GOD". In 2026, she starred as Sun-woo, a young CEO of fashion startup Woo22, in the Korean remake of Intern opposite Choi Min-Choi Min-sik, which was released on September 16, 2026.

== Endorsements ==
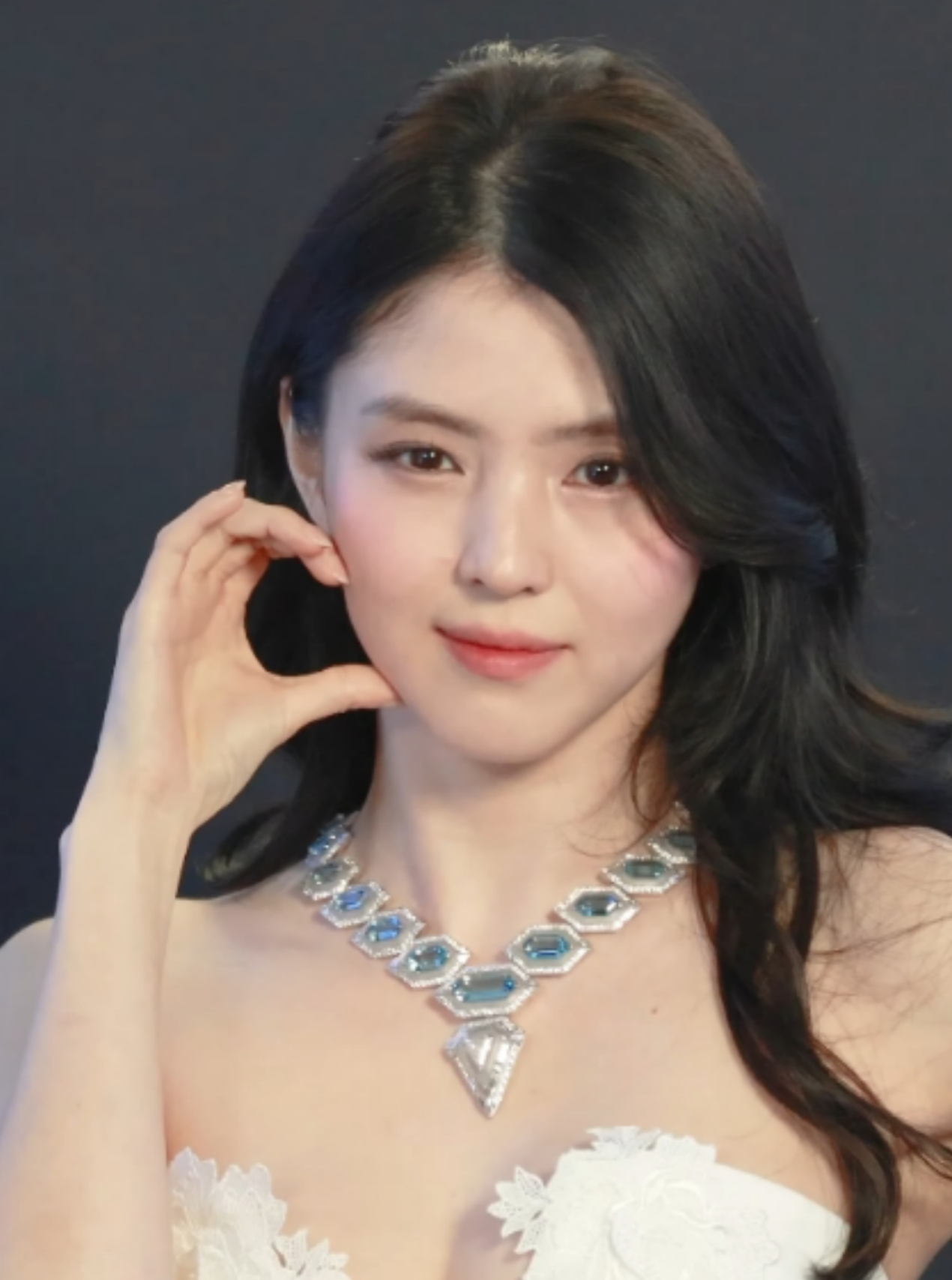
Han in a promotional video for Boucheron in November 2024

Han has been active as a model since 2016. Her advertisements include brands such as CJ Group, J.Estina, Banila Co., Eider, Charlotte Tilbury Beauty, L'Oréal, and Giordano International.

In 2022, Han became a global brand ambassador for luxury fashion house brand Balenciaga and Swiss luxury watch brand Omega SA. She modeled for Balenciaga's 2023 Spring/Summer collaborational campaign with Adidas.

In 2023, she was announced as the global brand ambassador for Singaporean fashion house label Charles & Keith, French luxury jewelry house Boucheron, and Korean-owned sportswear brand Fila. Also in 2023, Lotte Chilsung selected Han as the new face of Chum Churum soju.

In 2024, Han became a global brand ambassador for home appliance brand Shark.

In 2025, Han was named as global brand ambassador for Musinsa Standard, launching its 2025 FW Season Campaign in September. In November she was selected as the new exclusive model for the chicken franchise BHC Chicken and began her activities starting with an advertising campaign for the new product "Sweet Chili King" that same month.

== Public image ==
Han has been referred to in Korean media as part of the "MZ Troika" alongside fellow actresses Go Youn-jung and Shin Ye-eun. The title of actress troika has historically been used by Korean media to refer to the representative actresses of the generation, such as with Song Hye-kyo, Jun Ji-hyun, and Kim Tae-hee of the 2000s. In naming Han, The Chosun Ilbo pointed to Han's "box office success, charming visuals, and impeccable acting skills".

In several news sources, Han has been widely recognized as a prominent "fashion icon" and trendsetter Elle Singapore called Han an "epitome of a girl crush", and Korean fashion publications have noted that her personal style deviates from the conventional, polished celebrity aesthetics.

== Filmography ==
Key
†	Denotes films or TV productions that have not yet been released

=== Film ===
Year	Title	Role	Notes	Ref.
2023	Heavy Snow	Seol	Independent film	
2025	Project Y	Mi-sun		
2026	The Intern	Lee Seon-wu		

=== Television series ===
Year	Title	Role	Notes	Ref.
2017	Reunited Worlds	Lee Seo-won		
2017	Money Flower	Yoon Seo-won		
2018	100 Days My Prince	Kim So-hye		
2018	After the Rain	Soo-jin	Cameo (One-act drama)	
2019	Abyss	Jang Hee-jin / Oh Su-jin		
2020	The World of the Married	Yeo Da-kyung		
2021	Nevertheless	Yoo Na-bi		
2021	My Name	Yoon Ji-woo / Oh Hye-jin		
2022	Soundtrack #1	Lee Eun-soo		
2023–2024	Gyeongseong Creature	Yoon Chae-ok	Season 1–2	
TBA	Solo Leveling	Cha Hae-in		

=== Music video appearances ===
Year	Song title	Artist(s)	Ref.
2016	"Tell Me What To Do"	Shinee	
2017	"That Girl"	Jung Yong-hwa (feat. Loco)	
2018	"The Hardest Part"	Roy Kim	
2019	"You & I"	MeloMance	
2023	"Seven"	Jungkook (feat. Latto)	
2026	"Serve"	Xlov	

== Accolades ==
=== Awards and nominations ===
Name of the award ceremony, year presented, category, nominee(s) of the award, and the result of the nomination
Award ceremony	Year	Category	Nominee(s)/work(s)	Result	Ref.
APAN Star Awards	2021	Best New Actress	The World of the Married	Nominated	
APAN Star Awards	2022	Top Excellence Award, Actress in an OTT Drama	My Name	Nominated	
APAN Star Awards	2022	Popularity Star Award, Actress	My Name	Nominated	
Asia Artist Awards	2020	Rookie of the Year	The World of the Married	Won	
Asia Artist Awards	2021	Best Artist Award – Actress	Han So-hee	Won	
Asia Artist Awards	2021	Female Actress Popularity Award	Han So-hee	Nominated	
Asia Artist Awards	2022	Best Artist Award – Actress	Han So-hee	Won	
Asia Artist Awards	2026	Popularity Award – Actress	Han So-hee	Pending	
Asia Model Festival	2017	Model of the Year – CF	Han So-hee	Won	
Baeksang Arts Awards	2020	Best New Actress – Television	The World of the Married	Nominated	
Baeksang Arts Awards	2022	Best Actress – Television	My Name	Nominated	
Blue Dragon Series Awards	2022	Best New Actress	My Name	Nominated	
Brand of the Year Awards	2020	Best Actress of the Year – Rising Star	The World of the Married	Won	
Kinolights Awards	2021	Actress of the Year (Domestic)	Nevertheless; My Name	1st	
Korea First Brand Awards	2020	Best Rising Star Actress	The World of the Married	Won	
MBC Drama Awards	2017	Best New Actress	Money Flower	Nominated	

=== Listicles ===
Name of publisher, year listed, name of listicle, and placement
Publisher	Year	Listicle	Placement	Ref.
Cine21	2020	New Actress to watch out for in 2021	3rd (Note: Tied with Jeon Jong-seo)	
Cine21	2021	New Actress to watch out for in 2022	6th (Note: Tied with Park Eun-bin, Moon Ga-young, Keum Sae-rok, Joo Hyun-young, Rosie, Park Gyu-young, Lee Soo-kyung, Roh Yoon-seo, Gong Seung-yeon, Lee Se-young, Go Min-si, IU, Shin Hyun-bin, Park Ji-hu, Jung Ji-so, Yoon Seo-young, Bang Min-ah, Jeon Jong-seo and Roh Jeong-eui)	
Cine21	2021	Actress to watch out for in 2022	1st	
Cine21	2023	Actress to watch out for in 2023	3rd	
Cine21	2024	Actress to watch out for in 2024	2nd (Note: Tied with Go Min-si and Kim Tae-ri)	
Forbes	2021	Korea Power Celebrity 40	39th	
Forbes	2022	Korea Power Celebrity 40	28th	
Vogue Korea	2021	Notable Actress of 2021	Top 4	
Gallup Korea	2021	Talents Who Shined in 2021	Included	
Gallup Korea	2023	Talents Who Shined in 2023	Included	
