= List of The World of the Married characters =

This is a list of characters of the South Korean television series The World of the Married.

== Cast overview ==
Character	Portrayed by
Main
Ji Seon-u	Kim Hee-ae (Note: Jung Ha-eun portrays a young Ji Seon-u.)
Lee Tae-oh	Park Hae-joon
Yeo Da-kyung	Han So-hee
Go Ye-rim	Park Sun-young
Son Je-hyuk	Kim Young-min
Seol Myung-suk	Chae Gook-hee
Yeo Byung-gyu	Lee Geung-young
Uhm Hyo-jung	Kim Sun-kyung
Lee Jun-yeong	Jeon Jin-seo
Min Hyun-seo	Shim Eun-woo
Park In-gyu	Lee Hak-joo
Kim Yoon-gi	Lee Moo-saeng
Recurring
Ma Kang-seok	Park Choong-sun
Gong Ji-cheol	Jung Jae-sung
Ha Dong-sik	Kim Jong-tae
Nurse An	Kim Ha-neul
Nurse Joo Hwa-ni	Yoon Dan-bi
Jang Mi-yun	Jo Ah-ra
Yoon No-eul	Shin Soo-yeon
Cha Hae-gang	Jung Joon-won
Cha Do-cheol	Kim Tae-hyang
Cha Do-cheol's wife	Yoon In-jo
Chairman Choi	Choi Beom-ho
Chairman Choi's wife	Seo Yi-sook
Lee Jenny	Lee Ro-eun
Zoe	Oh So-hyun

== Main characters ==
=== Ji Seon-u ===
Ji Seon-u (Kim Hee-ae) is the associate director of Family Love Hospital and has been married to Lee Tae-oh for more than a decade. Seon-u grew up as a single child. Her father was a teacher and mother was a nurse. When she was 17, she lost both of her parents in a car accident and had to protect herself against the challenges in life.

To escape the pain and loneliness, she started to study assiduously to get into medical school in Seoul. There, she met Lee Tae-oh. Together, they started a family and settled in the city of Gosan, (Note: Go-san is a fictional city. The location was mostly based on and filmed in Chuncheon, Gangwon Province.) Tae-oh's hometown. She seems to have everything, including a caring husband, a son who lives up to expectations and a great reputation in the community.

Everything seemed to go smoothly, until she started to suspect that her husband is having an affair after discovering a strand of hair on his scarf. Based on her instincts, she starts to doubt all the people around her husband, and her world falls apart when she discovers what she suspected is true. The perfect life is now crushed. The husband she deeply trusts had betrayed her.

=== Lee Tae-oh ===
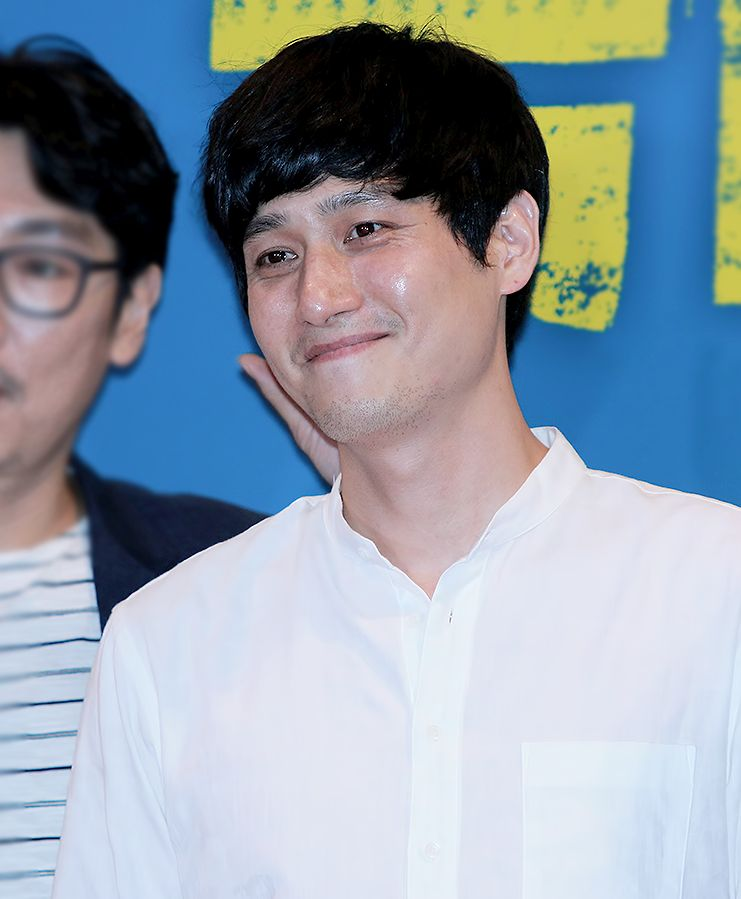
Park Hae-joon plays Lee Tae-oh

Lee Tae-oh (Park Hae-joon) is a movie director who has been married to Ji Seon-u for more than a decade. Eight years after his graduation, Tae-oh made his feature film debut as an assistant director. However, the movie flopped at the box office. After their marriage, he was unemployed and ultimately started an entertainment company with the help of Seon-u.

As days go by, he became stressed and pressured to succeed or to stop as he has been dependent on his wife for income. One day, he met Yeo Da-kyung after a night at a club with the staff. He felt confident standing in front of the young beautiful woman who thinks he is a successful businessman. It was different from the sense of stability given by Seon-u. Tae-oh and Da-kyung then secretly started an affair, despite the fact that he still loves his wife.

=== Yeo Da-kyung ===
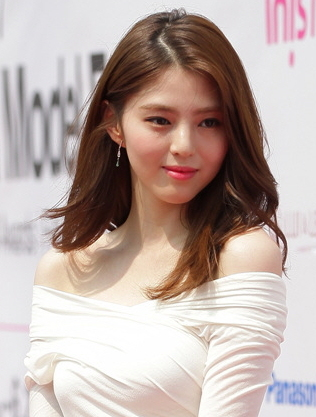
Han So-hee plays Yeo Da-kyung

Yeo Da-kyung (Han So-hee) is the only daughter of Yeo Byung-gyu and Uhm Hyo-jung. Da-kyung grew up in luxury so she lives without worries and life goals. She majored in contemporary dance following her mother's wishes even when she had no passion or talent in dancing. Ultimately, she decided to stop dancing and became a pilates instructor. The innocent and vulnerable girl then fell in love with Lee Tae-oh, a married man, and has been having an affair with him for over two years.

=== Go Ye-rim ===
Go Ye-rim (Park Sun-young) is the wife of Son Je-hyuk, a friend and neighbor of Ji Seon-u and Lee Tae-oh. After marrying Je-hyuk, Ye-rim became a full-time housewife. She discovered about her husband's affairs, one-night stands and sex addiction a long time ago, yet she still could not break away from him. She didn't want to be a divorcee. Instead of getting a divorce, Ye-rim continues to live in a world full of lies. She eventually noticed that her husband developed a crush on her friend, Seon-u. She ultimately betrayed Seon-u by choosing to keep Tae-oh's affair a secret.

=== Son Je-hyuk ===
Son Je-hyuk (Kim Young-min) is the husband of Go Ye-rim, as well as a friend of Lee Tae-oh and Ji Seon-u. He works as an accountant. He loves his calm and faithful wife, but he easily gets bored. He often enjoys affairs and uses the nature of his work as an excuse to get home late. As he continuously engages in adultery, he eventually develops a crush on Ji Seon-u.

=== Seol Myung-suk ===
Seol Myung-suk (Chae Gook-hee) is a gynecologist at Family Love Hospital and a close friend of Lee Tae-oh and Ji Seon-u. Myung-suk is a single woman who has never been in a serious relationship with a man. She is a two-faced person that would betray anyone she claims as a 'friend' to get anything that she wants. She tries to take advantage of the tensions between Seon-u and Tae-oh to snatch the associate director position from Seon-u.

=== Yeo Byung-gyu ===
Yeo Byung-gyu (Lee Geung-young) is the father of Yeo Da-kyung and husband of Uhm Hyo-jung. Byung-gyu is a very influential businessman, and there is no one in Gosan who dares to go against his will. Along with his wealth, he also has strong connections with local officials and politicians. He is willing to do everything in his power to make his daughter happy.

=== Uhm Hyo-jung ===
Uhm Hyo-jung (Kim Sun-kyung) is the mother of Yeo Da-kyung and wife of Yeo Byeong-gyu. Hyo-jung is a full-time housewife and a former beauty pageant contestant. She is also a patient of Ji Seon-u. Because Hyo-jung wants the best for her daughter, she tries to get everything out of Da-kyung's way, including going against Seon-u.

=== Lee Jun-yeong ===
Lee Jun-yeong (Jeon Jin-seo) is the only son of Ji Seon-u and Lee Tae-oh. Jun-yeong is closer to Tae-oh because Seon-u is busy at work most of the time. He was a bright and happy single child in the family. Unfortunately, problems arise right during his adolescence. As a teenager, he continuously sides with either one of his parents while he deals with his inner conflicts and psychological pain.

=== Min Hyun-seo ===
Min Hyun-seo (Shim Eun-woo) is a bartender who suffers from physical and emotional abuse because of her boyfriend. She endures every pain caused by her boyfriend out of pity. She had to face her miserable life with In-kyu until she gets to know Ji Seon-u as one of her patients. She befriends with Seon-u and helps her discover the affair of Tae-oh and Da-kyung, while Seon-u tries her best to help Hyun-seo in her medical needs as well as trying to escape from In-kyu.

=== Park In-gyu ===
Park In-gyu (Lee Hak-joo) is the abusive boyfriend of Min Hyun-seo. After falling into gambling and failing the public exam multiple times, In-kyu's parents cut off their financial support and as a result, In-kyu became increasingly angry in his daily life. Violence began as an excuse for Hyun-seo to not have another man every time she returns from work late. He mistakes dependence and attachment for love.

=== Kim Yoon-gi ===
Kim Yoon-gi (Lee Moo-saeng) is a doctor and specialist in the neuropsychiatry department at Family Love Hospital. Yoon-ki got married at a young age, but his marriage ended in divorce. After the divorce, he moved to Gosan and joined Family Love Hospital. He becomes fond of Seon-u as he observes her dealing with her problems from afar.

== Recurring characters ==
=== Family Love Hospital ===
- Ma Kang-seok (Park Choong-sun) is doctor at Family Love Hospital who has been suffering from alcoholism since the death of a loved one.
- Gong Ji-cheol (Jung Jae-sung) is the head director of Family Love Hospital. He shows a lot of sexist tendencies toward his female workers, particularly Ji Seon-u and Seol Myung-suk.
- Ha Dong-sik (Kim Jong-tae) is a regular patient of Ji Seon-u. Dong-sik suffers from a neurological disorder and anxiety. He is a patient who most doctors try to avoid as he visits the hospital every day even for minor problems, and Seon-u is the only doctor in Gosan who dares to treat him.
- Nurse An (Kim Ha-neul)
- Nurse Joo Hwa-ni (Yoon Dan-bi)

=== Others ===
- Jang Mi-yun (Jo Ah-ra) is the secretary of Lee Tae-oh, and the single mom of Yoon No-eul. She maintains a good relationship with Seon-u even after she no longer works for Tae-oh as their children are close friends.
- Yoon No-eul (Shin Soo-yeon) is the daughter of Jang Mi-yun and a classmate of Lee Jun-yeong who later develops a crush on him. She dealt with her parents' divorce but rather than being traumatic about it, she embraces it and isn't much affected by it.
- Cha Hae-gang (Jung Joon-won) is a friend of Lee Jun-yeong and Yoon No-eul, and the son of Cha Do-cheol. Hae-gang has a crush on No-eul. Like his mother, he likes bad mouthing others, especially Ji Seon-u and Lee Jun-yeong.
- Cha Do-cheol (Kim Tae-hyang) is a councillor in the city of Gosan.
- Cha Do-cheol's wife (Yoon In-jo) is Cha Hae-agng's mom and a member of Gosan Women's Association who likes to bad-mouth others, especially Ji Seon-u.
- Chairman Choi (Choi Beom-ho) is a real estate guru in Gosan and a friend of Yeo Byung-gyu.
- Chairman Choi's wife (Seo Yi-sook) is a former patient of Ji Seon-u, who discovers her husband's affair through Ji Seon-u's medical checkup. In return, she starts to support Seon-u in joining the Gosan Women's Association and counter-attacks people who bad-mouth Seon-u.
- Gong Ji-cheol's wife (Park Mi-hyun)
- Lee Jenny (Lee Ro-eun) is the daughter of Lee Tae-oh and Yeo Da-kyung and half‐sister of Lee Jun-yeong.
- Lee Min-ki (Lee Dong-ha) is the assistant of Yeo Byung-gyu.
- Sang-hyun (Song Hoon)
- Seon-u's attorney (Kwon Hyuk)
- Zoe (Oh So-hyun) is a bartender with whom Son Je-hyuk is infatuated and will eventually have an affair.
- Woo Ho-sang (Yoo Yong)
- Bae Jung-sim (Jung Jae-soon) She is the mother of Lee Tae-oh's.

== Guest characters ==
- Yoon Sun-woo plays a college student who is rejected by Yeo Da-kyung in the last episode of the series.
