= My Name (TV series) =

2021 Netflix television series

- Promotional poster
- Also known as: Undercover; Nemesis
- Hangul: 마이 네임
- RR: Mai neim
- MR: Mai neim
- Genre: Action; Crime; Thriller; Romance; Noir
- Developed by: Netflix
- Written by: Kim Ba-da
- Directed by: Kim Jin-min
- Starring: Han So-hee; Park Hee-soon; Ahn Bo-hyun
- Composer: Hwang Sang-jun
- Country of origin: South Korea
- Original language: Korean
- No. of seasons: 1
- No. of episodes: 8

Production
- Executive producer: Yoo Jeong-wan
- Producers: Bae Joon-mo; Choi Myung-gyu; Yeom Jun-ho
- Editor: Hwang Yi-seol
- Running time: 45–59 minutes
- Production company: Studio Santa Claus Entertainment

Original release
- Network: Netflix
- Release: October 15, 2021

My Name (Korean: 마이 네임) is a 2021 South Korean action crime thriller television series directed by Kim Jin-min and starring Han So-hee, Park Hee-soon, and Ahn Bo-hyun. The series revolves around a woman who joins a gang to avenge her father's death and then becomes the gang's mole inside the police force. Three episodes out of eight were screened at 26th Busan International Film Festival in newly created 'On Screen' section, on October 7, 2021. It was released on Netflix on October 15, 2021.

== Synopsis ==
Yoon Ji-woo's (Han So-hee) father dies suddenly. She desperately wants to take revenge on whoever is responsible for her father's death. Ji-woo then works for drug crime gang Dongcheon, led by Choi Mu-jin (Park Hee-soon). With the help of Mu-jin and to uncover the reason for her father's death, Ji-woo joins the police force and becomes a mole for Dongcheon. Ji-woo, using her fake name Oh Hye-jin, is assigned to work in the drug investigation unit in the Inchang Metropolitan Police Station. Her partner there is Detective Jeon Pil-do (Ahn Bo-hyun).

== Cast ==
=== Main ===
- Han So-hee as Yoon Ji-woo / Song Ji-woo / Oh Hye-jin

A member of Dongcheon who infiltrates the police force as Oh Hye-jin, seeking revenge for her father's murder.

- Park Hee-soon as Choi Mu-jin

The boss of Dongcheon, which is Korea's biggest drug ring. He trusts Ji-woo simply because of the power of her desperation. He was best friends with Ji-woo's father.

- Ahn Bo-hyun as Jeon Pil-do

A detective of Inchang Metropolitan Police Station's Narcotics unit who becomes Hye-jin's partner after she joins the unit. He initially disliked her because she ruined a sting operation he had been planning for 6 months.

=== Supporting ===
- Kim Sang-ho as Cha Gi-ho

The leader of Inchang Metropolitan Police Station's Narcotics unit who swore to take down Dongcheon before he retires.

- Lee Hak-joo as Jung Tae-ju

A member of Dongcheon, he is Mu-jin's most trusted henchman.

- Chang Ryul as Do Gang-jae

A former member of Dongcheon, he swears revenge against the organization after getting expelled for drugging and attempting to sexually assault Ji-woo when he lost to her in a fight match.

- Yoon Kyung-ho as Yoon Dong-hoon / Song Joon-su

Ji-woo's father and Mu-jin's close friend whose murder sets off Ji-woo's revenge journey.

- Baek Joo-hee as Kang Soo-yeon
- Moon Sang-min as Ko Gun-pyung

== Episodes ==
No.	Title	Directed by	Written by	Original release date
1	"Episode 1"	Kim Jin-min	Kim Ba-da	October 15, 2021
Yoon Ji-woo is the daughter of Yoon Dong-hoon, a gangster. On the night of her seventeenth birthday, Ji-woo witnesses her father getting shot to death by a hooded man. As the police are unable to find the killer, Ji-woo asks for help from Choi Mu-jin: Dong-hoon's boss and close friend, and the leader of Dongcheon, an organized crime syndicate. Although reluctant at first, Mu-jin takes Ji-woo under his wing, encouraging her to become strong enough to get her revenge. He places her in his fight training gym with other gang recruits and personally gives her hand-to-hand training.
2	"Episode 2"	Kim Jin-min	Kim Ba-da	October 15, 2021
During a fight competition among the gang recruits, Ji-woo ultimately defeats Do Gang-jae, one of the group's most promising recruits. Gang-jae is angered at being defeated and drugs Ji-woo with the intention to rape her, but she fends him off. Mu-jin punishes Gang-jae by cutting his face and expelling him from Dongcheon. Mu-jin gives Ji-woo the gun that killed her father — it's police-issue, so he tells her the killer has to be a police officer. Ji-woo is accepted into the gang and given a new identity: Oh Hye-jin, which she is to use to infiltrate the police. Four years later, Ji-woo transfers to the Narcotics Bureau under Captain Cha Gi-ho, a man who unsuccessfully came looking for her after her father's death. Ji-woo's new partner, Jeon Pil-do, dislikes her at first but is impressed by her brutality in the field.
3	"Episode 3"	Kim Jin-min	Kim Ba-da	October 15, 2021
Narcotics runs a raid on Mu-jin; Ji-woo is unable to warn him beforehand but sabotages the raid, allowing Mu-jin to escape. Ji-woo plants the gun that was used to kill her father on the site, forcing the police to take it in as evidence. Mu-jin's second-in-command, Jung Tae-ju, questions Ji-woo's loyalty, while Mu-jin believes a mole is leaking information to Gi-ho. Jiwoo learns that Mu-jin is the Narcotics team's number one target, and Gi-ho has a personal vendetta against him to avenge a dead teammate. Gang-jae has become the head of his own successful criminal enterprise and is out for revenge, by directly competing with Mu-jin's drug business and attacking Mu-jin's gym.
4	"Episode 4"	Kim Jin-min	Kim Ba-da	October 15, 2021
Gi-ho's team learn about Gang-jae's presence in the drug distribution scene. Gi-ho suspects there's a mole in the police and sets a trap by making it seem as though Tae-ju is his informant. Ji-woo relays the false information on Tae-ju back to Mu-jin. Gi-ho orders Pil-do to keep a close eye on Ji-woo. Ballistics reveal that the gun that killed Dong-hoon belonged to Song Joon-su, Gi-ho's teammate who was killed by Mu-jin's gang over ten years earlier. Pil-do trails Ji-woo, but only sees her questioning people in trying to track down Gang-jae. Pil-do joins her and they find Gang-jae, but Gang-jae captures them. Gang-jae puts a hit on Mu-jin, but Mu-jin defeats the attackers.
5	"Episode 5"	Kim Jin-min	Kim Ba-da	October 15, 2021
Mu-jin secretly saves Ji-woo and Pil-do from being killed by Gang-jae. Since Ji-woo was badly injured by Gang-jae, Pil-do declares his trust in her, but Gi-ho continues to have her investigated. Dongcheon and the police hunt for Gang-jae but cannot find him. Mu-jin orders Ji-woo to leave the country for her safety, but she refuses. Ji-woo is recognized by Sergeant Cho, who investigated her father's murder, and he tells her that the case was buried by Gi-ho. Mu-jin learns about this meeting and has Cho, who has been secretly working for him, killed. Gang-jae contacts Gi-ho and offers to help them catch Mu-jin. The police use this intel to ambush a fight between Mu-jin and Gang-jae's gangs. Ji-woo helps Mu-jin escape, and kills Gang-jae to prevent him from revealing her identity.
6	"Episode 6"	Kim Jin-min	Kim Ba-da	October 15, 2021
Ji-woo receives a delayed package from Gang-jae that contains an old photo of her father in police uniform, using the name Song Joon-su. Ji-woo confronts Mu-jin, who says that Dong-hoon was an undercover cop working for Gi-ho, but flipped sides and that Gi-ho must have killed him for that betrayal. Mu-jin doubts that Ji-woo can finish the job and orders Tae-ju to kill Gi-ho. Tae-ju stabs Gi-ho but Ji-woo finds Gi-ho as he's bleeding out and reveals her true identity. Gi-ho tells her that Dong-hoon never switched sides and that Mu-jin killed him when he found out about his duplicity. Gi-ho gives Ji-woo evidence to prove Dong-hoon's loyalty to the police, along with a letter that Dong-hoon meant for Ji-woo to receive upon his death. Ji-woo uses a cigarette lighter to burn the Dongcheon tattoo off her chest. Pil-do finds Gi-ho and sends him to the hospital.
7	"Episode 7"	Kim Jin-min	Kim Ba-da	October 15, 2021
Gi-ho survives surgery but is unconscious. Tae-ju, acting independently of Mu-jin, attacks Ji-woo but she kills him; before he dies, he tells her that Mu-jin killed her father himself. Mu-jin gives himself up to the police to test Ji-woo's loyalty. She steals evidence, exposing herself as the mole but escapes, allowing Mu-jin to go free. Mu-jin learns that Ji-woo knows that he killed her father, and that she got him out of police custody so that she can kill him. The Narcotics team discover information linking Ji-woo to Mu-jin and the attack on Gi-ho. Pil-do, acting on a hunch, finds Ji-woo at a cemetery with her parents' ashes and arrests her.
8	"Episode 8"	Kim Jin-min	Kim Ba-da	October 15, 2021
Mu-jin learns of Ji-woo's arrest and arranges for her to be sent to a hospital for medical treatment, where she escapes. Gi-ho wakes up and tells Pil-do about Ji-woo's past and how she was manipulated by Mu-jin. Pil-do catches up to Ji-woo as she's attacked by Mu-jin's men, and they escape together. Pil-do takes her to a beach house where they have sex, and he convinces her to arrest Mu-jin the way her father wanted. Mu-jin is angered that Ji-woo hasn't come to him for her revenge and kills Pil-do in front of her. Ji-woo, who had been about to give herself up, realizes that she'd rather be a monster to get her revenge and goes after Mu-jin. She rampages through his henchmen and fights Mu-jin, ultimately killing him. In an epilogue, Ji-woo visits the graves of her parents and Pil-do.

== Production ==
On August 11, 2020 Netflix confirmed through a press release that it would distribute another Korean original series Undercover, to be produced by Studio Santa Claus Entertainment Co., Ltd. (named as Fleet Co., Ltd. at the time, and the same production house behind Lucky Romance, My Sassy Girl and Another Child), written by Life Risking Romance TV series writer Kim Ba-da and directed by Extracurricular TV series director Kim Jin-min. In September 2020, the cast of TV series was confirmed. Filming began in November 2020 and ended in February 2021.

Actors Han So-hee and Lee Hak-joo previously worked together in the 2020 JTBC drama series The World of the Married. The series also marks the second time that actors Ahn Bo-hyun and Yoon Kyung-ho acted together after the series Itaewon Class, which also aired on JTBC in 2020.

== Reception ==
On the review aggregator website Rotten Tomatoes, 100% of 7 critics' reviews are positive, with an average rating of 7.4/10.

== Original soundtrack ==
My Name OST

Soundtrack album by Various Artists
- Genres: Soundtrack, Pop
- Languages: Korean, English
- Label: Netflix/Genie/Stone

=== Track listings ===
No.	Title	Artist	Length
1.	"My Name (ft. Swervy, JEMINN)"	Hwang Sang Jun, Swervy, JEMINN	4:16
2.	"Mediocre Life (ft. Pre-Holiday)"	Hwang Sang Jun, Pre-Holiday	2:53
3.	"Alone"	Park Eun-ji	4:14
4.	"Chasing lost memories"	Lee Tae hyeon	3:36
5.	"Shadow"	Lee Ahram	3:28
6.	"Decision"	Ma Sang Woo	2:51
7.	"Confusion"	Park Eun-ji	2:44
8.	"Duel"	Lee Ahram	3:17
9.	"I was on to you"	Ma Sang Woo	3:14
10.	"Fighter"	Ma Sang Woo	3:36
11.	"In my Mind"	Lee Tae hyeon	2:48
12.	"Empty"	Park Eun-ji	3:32
13.	"Remembrance"	Yeom Seung-jae	2:26
14.	"Force"	Lee Ahram	2:21
15.	"Nightmare"	Lee Ahram	3:39
16.	"Lost Control"	Lee Tae hyeon	3:34
17.	"Undercover"	Lee Tae hyeon	3:43
18.	"Training"	Park Eun-ji	3:19
19.	"Port City"	Hwang Sang Jun	2:46

== Accolades ==
=== Awards and nominations ===
Name of the award ceremony, year presented, category, nominee of the award, and the result of the nomination
Award ceremony	Year	Category	Nominee	Result	Ref.
APAN Star Awards	2022	Top Excellence Award, Actress in a OTT	Han So-hee	Nominated	
APAN Star Awards	2022	Excellence Award, Actor in a OTT	Ahn Bo-hyun	Won	
APAN Star Awards	2022	Best Supporting Actor	Yoon Kyung-ho	Nominated	
APAN Star Awards	2022	Popularity Star Award, Actress	Han So-hee	Nominated	
Baeksang Arts Awards	2022	Best Actress	Han So-hee	Nominated	
Blue Dragon Series Awards	2022	Best Supporting Actor	Ahn Bo-hyun	Nominated	
Blue Dragon Series Awards	2022	Best New Actor	Chang Ryul	Nominated	
Blue Dragon Series Awards	2022	Best New Actress	Han So-hee	Nominated	

=== Listicle ===
Publisher	Year	Listicle	Placement	Ref.
NME	2021	The 10 best Korean dramas of 2021	7th	
