= Lee Soo-kyung =

Lee Soo-kyung is a Korean name consisting of the family name Lee and the given name Soo-kyung, and may refer to:

- Lee Soo-kyung (actress, born 1982), South Korean actress
- Lee Soo-kyung (actress, born 1996), South Korean actress
