= IU =

IU may refer to:

== Businesses and organizations ==
=== Sport ===
- Indiana Hoosiers, the athletic program of Indiana University Bloomington, often called (technically incorrectly) "IU"
- Islamabad United, a cricket team franchise in Pakistan Super League

=== Universities ===
- Ilam University, a public university in Ilam, Iran
- Indiana University, a multi-campus public university system in the state of Indiana, United States
  - Indiana University Bloomington, the system's flagship campus and often conflated with the system
- Islamic University, Bangladesh
- Ho Chi Minh City International University, a member institution of Vietnam Vietnam National University in Ho Chi Minh city
- Independence University
- International University, Cambodia, a private higher education institution in Phnom Penh, Cambodia
- IU International University of Applied Sciences, Erfurt, Germany
- Isra University, Hyderabad, Sindh, Pakistan
- Istanbul University
- Ittihad University, Ras Al Khaimah, United Arab Emirates

=== Other organizations ===
- The IU, a Georgist political organization in London
- Intermediate Unit, a regional educational service agency in Pennsylvania
- Izquierda Unida ("United Left" in Spanish, political party)
  - Izquierda Unida (Argentina)
  - Izquierda Unida (Spain)
- Super Air Jet, IATA Code IU, an Indonesian airline

== Language ==
- Intonational unit, a segment of speech
- Inuktitut language (ISO 639 alpha-2)

== Science, technology, and mathematics ==
- Iu interface, in the RANAP telecommunications protocol
- Instruction unit, the part of a computer CPU that manages instruction fetch and instruction issue
- Saturn V instrument unit, a guidance system for the Saturn V rocket
- International unit, a unit for biological activity used in pharmacology
- Inter-universal Teichmüller theory, a mathematical theory by Shinichi Mochizuki

== Arts and entertainment ==
- IU (entertainer) (born 1993), South Korean singer and actress
  - I U (EP), a 2011 Japanese compilation album by IU
