= The Intern (2026 film) =

2026 South Korean comedy drama film

- Theatrical release poster
- Hangul: 인턴
- RR: Inteon
- MR: Int'ŏn
- Directed by: Kim Do-young
- Screenplay by: Kim Do-young
- Based on: The Intern by Nancy Meyers
- Produced by: Choi Jae-won
- Starring: Choi Min-sik; Han So-hee
- Cinematography: Shin Tae-ho
- Edited by: Lee Kang-hee
- Music by: Narae
- Production companies: Anthology Studios; Warner Bros. Korea
- Distributed by: Warner Bros. Pictures
- Release date: September 16, 2026
- Country: South Korea
- Language: Korean
- Box office: $6.7 million

The Intern (Korean: 인턴) is a 2026 South Korean comedy-drama film directed by Kim Do-young. A remake of Nancy Meyers's 2015 film, it stars Choi Min-sik stepping into the roles of "Ben" Whittaker, and Han So-hee of Jules Ostin. Distributed by Warner Bros. Korea, the film was released in South Korea on September 16, 2026.

== Plot ==
Kim Ki-ho, a widower adjusting to retirement, finds himself increasingly unfulfilled by his otherwise comfortable routine. Living alone, he maintains the habit of placing flowers before his late wife's photograph each morning. When he comes across an advertisement seeking a senior intern, he applies for a position at Woo22, a rapidly growing fashion company founded by Lee Sun-woo three years earlier. Woo22 hires Ki-ho alongside several younger interns, including Park Ju-seong and Oh Yun-hee, on three-month contracts.

Unfamiliar with the workplace culture of younger employees, Ki-ho attempts to prepare for his new position by researching how to communicate with the younger generation. However, he discovers that the company has little intention of assigning him meaningful responsibilities, having hired him primarily to obtain tax incentives. His supervisor, team leader Choi Min-a, and Sun-woo rarely give him assignments, leaving him with little to do. Rather than simply waiting for his contract to expire, Ki-ho begins looking for ways to contribute. Although some of his initial efforts lead to complications, he gradually finds ways to make himself useful and develops relationships with the younger interns and other employees.

Meanwhile, Sun-woo struggles to manage the demands of running Woo22. The company also faces the risk of its unreleased designs being leaked. Sun-woo's difficulties lead her senior colleague and VP, Gu Young-hwan, to suggest bringing in a professional CEO to stabilize the business. Although Woo22's rapid growth reflects her success as its founder, Sun-woo is reluctant to relinquish control of the company she built. As Ki-ho gradually earns her trust, he becomes more closely involved in her daily affairs. When the company's driver unexpectedly becomes unavailable, Ki-ho takes over the responsibility of driving Sun-woo, gaining further insight into her professional and personal difficulties.

While driving Sun-woo to her husband's workplace, Ki-ho accidentally witnesses her husband having an affair with a woman. Unsure whether to tell her, he accompanies Sun-woo on a business trip to Tokyo. During an evening together, Sun-woo confides in Ki-ho about the problems confronting her. She reveals that Young-hwan has betrayed her by leaking designs and approaching investors with a proposal to bring in an outside CEO without her consent. She also discusses the breakdown of her seven-year marriage. Overwhelmed by these revelations, Sun-woo blames herself for the circumstances. Ki-ho encourages her not to hold herself responsible for the actions of those who have betrayed her and reminds her of her own abilities and worth.

Encouraged by Ki-ho's support, Sun-woo decides to confront her circumstances. She faces the reality of her husband's infidelity and chooses to end their marriage. She also terminates her professional relationship with Young-hwan, removing him from the company. After completing his three-month internship, Ki-ho returns to his retired life. Six months later, he spends a leisurely morning listening to music in a park when Sun-woo approaches him. The two sit together and listen to music, having developed a friendship that extends beyond their former working relationship.

== Cast ==
- Choi Min-sik as Kim Ki-ho, the intern
- Han So-hee as Lee Sun-woo, CEO of Woo22
- Kim Jun-han as Gu Young-hwan
- Ryu Hye-young as Choi Min-a
- Kim Geum-soon as Kim Hui-suk
- Park Ye-ni as Seo Yoo-jin
- Kim Yo-han as Park Ju-seong
- Yoon Sang-jeong as Oh Yun-hee
- Kang Tae-oh as Kang Min-wook
- Han Ji-eun as Baek Ru-da

== Production ==
=== Development ===
In August 2024, Warner Bros. Discovery made a deal with Jack Nguyen through his new company, Joat Films, that he would get the first chance to develop film projects based on Warner Bros.' English-language films and remake them for Asian audiences. Their first planned project was decided to be the Korean remake of the 2015 comedy-drama The Intern by Nancy Meyers.

=== Casting ===
In August 2025, it was confirmed that Choi Min-sik and Han So-hee would star together in the film Intern, directed by Kim Do‑young.

=== Filming ===
Principal photography began on September 29, 2025 and filming ended on December 6, 2025.

== Release ==
The Intern was released in South Korean theaters by Warner Bros. Pictures on September 16, 2026 coinciding with Chuseok holidays, followed by releases in nine Asian countries in October 2026, starting with the Philippines on October 14 and continuing in Hong Kong, Indonesia, Malaysia, Singapore, Taiwan, Thailand, Vietnam and Cambodia from October 16.

Beijing-based Blossoms Entertainment acquired worldwide sales rights (excluding Asia) to the film as their first South Korean title.

== Reception ==
=== Box office ===
The film was released on 1473 screens and registered the highest opening-day gross with 61,038 viewers, taking top spot in overall box-office rankings surpassing The Odyssey. It crossed 400,000 viewers in its opening weekend, reaching a total audience of 403,906 and securing the number-one position at the Korean box office.

As of October 10, 2026, the film has grossed US$6,371,045 from 868,465 admissions.

=== Critical response ===
Lee Min-ji of Yonhap News Agency described the Korean remake as a warm, feel-good workplace film that explores generational tensions and Korea's seniority culture. She praised the chemistry between Choi Min-sik and Han So-hee, as well as the supporting cast, while criticizing the episodic and predictable narrative. She also highlights the effective use of Korean settings, cultural details, social media, and the digital divide. Lee viewed the film as an uplifting "workplace fairy tale", despite feeling that its story does not fully match the strength of its performances.
