= Murder at Honeymoon Hotel =

- Poster
- Chinese: 蜜月酒店杀人事件
- Directed by: Jang Cheol-soo; Chun Byung-cheol 李光浩 千丙哲
- Written by: Shao Luyan; Wang Hailin; Li Guanghao
- Produced by: Ye Mingxin; Lu Hongshi
- Starring: Zhang Jingchu; Peter Ho; Kim Young-min; Ni Hongjie; Goh-Wee Ping
- Cinematography: Jang Do-hun
- Music by: Park Seonghoon
- Production companies: China Overseas Thumb Culture Communication; Beijing Yinrun Entertainment; Zhongbo Yinsheng (Beijing) Media; Shanghai Yinrun Advertising Media; China Movie Channel SARFT
- Distributed by: Shanghai Yinrun Advertising Media; Haining Yinrun Pictures
- Release date: 27 May 2016 (China)
- Running time: 97 minutes
- Countries: China; South Korea
- Language: Mandarin
- Box office: CN¥5.6 million (China)

Murder at Honeymoon Hotel is a 2016 Chinese-South Korean suspense drama film directed by Jang Cheol-soo, 李光浩 and 千丙哲 and starring Zhang Jingchu, Peter Ho, Kim Young-min, Ni Hongjie, and Goh-Wee Ping. It was released in China by Shanghai Yinrun Advertising Media and Haining Yinrun Pictures on 27 May 2016.

== Plot ==
A young girl by the name of Feifei was being taunted about how she looked by an actress named Per'er. So Feifei decided to get plastic surgery to look exactly like Per'er, kill her, and go after Per'er's boyfriend Kai Bin.

== Cast ==
- Zhang Jingchu as Per'er
- Peter Ho
- Kim Young-min as Wu Dazhi
- Ni Hongjie
- Goh-Wee Ping as Hotel Manager
- Wen Xiang as Security captain

== Reception ==
The film has grossed CN¥5.6 million at the Chinese box office.
