= Project Y (film) =

2025 film by Lee Hwan

- Theatrical release poster
- Hangul: 프로젝트 Y
- RR: Peurojekteu Y
- MR: P'ŭrojekt'ŭ Y
- Directed by: Lee Hwan
- Written by: Lee Hwan; Oh Yu-kyung; Kwak Jae-min
- Produced by: Byun Seung Min; Yang Yoomin Hailey
- Starring: Han So-hee; Jeon Jong-seo; Kim Shin-rok; Jung Young-joo; Lee Jae-kyoon; YooA; Kim Sung-cheol
- Cinematography: Yoo Young-gi
- Edited by: Han Mee-yeon
- Music by: Gray
- Production companies: Wow Point; Climax Studio
- Distributed by: Plus M Entertainment
- Release dates: September 10, 2025 (TIFF); January 21, 2026 (South Korea)
- Running time: 110 minutes
- Country: South Korea
- Language: Korean
- Box office: $947,118

Project Y (Korean: 프로젝트 Y) is a 2025 South Korean neo-noir crime drama film written and directed by Lee Hwan. Starring Han So-hee and Jeon Jong-seo, the film depicts the desire of two friends of the same age to steal 8 billion gold bars against the backdrop of Gangnam, Seoul. The supporting cast includes Kim Shin-rok, Jung Young-joo, Lee Jae-kyoon, YooA, and Kim Sung-cheol.

The film had its world premiere in the Special Presentations section of the 2025 Toronto International Film Festival on September 10, 2025. It has also been invited to the 'Korean Cinema Today - Special Premiere' section of the 30th Busan International Film Festival, where it was screened on September 18, 2025. It was released theatrically on January 21, 2026 in South Korea.

== Plot ==
Yoon Mi-sun, who works as a florist by day and a star hostess under the name Ye-seul by night, and Lee Do-kyung, an unlicensed driver for Gangnam's nightlife district, are childhood friends who live together as each other's only family. After years of saving enough money to leave the city's underworld behind, they lose everything to a real estate scam orchestrated by the ruthless crime boss To, whose criminal influence extends throughout the Hwajoong Market entertainment district.

An opportunity for revenge arises when Do-kyung learns the location of To's hidden fortune after his neglected wife, Ha-kyung, is drugged into revealing where he has concealed ₩700 million in cash. Mi-sun and Do-kyung infiltrate To's operation intending to steal the money, only to discover an even greater treasure: gold bars worth ₩8 billion. The theft sets off a relentless pursuit led by To's powerful enforcer Bull, while To eliminates anyone suspected of betraying him, including Ha-kyung and others connected to the stolen fortune.

As they evade To's organization, the pair seek help from their mentor Choi Ga-young, a legendary former hostess and maternal figure to both women. Ga-young provides leverage against a Japanese ambassador by exposing evidence of his affair and drug use, but later absconds with the gold herself before reconciling with Do-kyung. Meanwhile, Mi-sun disrupts To's basketball match-fixing scheme by persuading star player Lee Han-wook to ignore the fix and play to win, further weakening the crime boss's grip over his criminal empire. Ga-young sacrifices herself by dragging Bull into a tar pit, killing them both, while Mi-sun and Do-kyung confront To in a final struggle. They overpower him and push him into the same tar pit, killing him. With To's empire destroyed, Mi-sun and Do-kyung recover the gold bars they had risked everything to obtain. Freed from the debts and criminal world that had defined their lives, the two finally earn the chance to begin anew.

== Cast ==
- Han So-hee as Yoon Mi-sun
- Jeon Jong-seo as Lee Do-kyung
- Kim Shin-rok as Choi Ga-young
- Jung Young-joo as Bull
- Lee Jae-kyoon as Seok-gu
- YooA as Ha-kyung
- Kim Sung-cheol as Boss To
- Park Bo-in as Hardcore young lady

== Production ==
In August 2024, Han So-hee and Jeon Jong-seo confirmed their appearance in the film through Instagram post. In January 2025, it was confirmed by their respective agencies that Kim Shin-rok, and Kim Sung-cheol has joined the cast.

== Original soundtrack ==
The original soundtrack of the film was released on January 21, 2026. The digital album contains 6 vocal songs and 31 score tracks.

Project Y

Soundtrack album by GRAY
- Released: 2026
- Genre: Soundtrack
- Languages: Korean; English
- Labels: Music & New Co., Ltd; SLL

Released on January 21, 2026
No.	Title	Lyrics	Music	Artist	Length
1.	"FOOL FOR YOU"	GRAY (Gray), DeVita	GRAY (Gray), DeVita	Hwasa	3:30
2.	"Tide"	GRAY (Gray)	GRAY (Gray)	Kim Wan-sun	2:08
3.	"THE CABARET"	GRAY (Gray)	GRAY (Gray)	DeVita	1:34
4.	"ELECTRIC LIGHTS"	GRAY (Gray)	GRAY (Gray)	Hoody	3:05
5.	"WHISPERS IN THE NIGHT"	GRAY (Gray)	GRAY (Gray)	DeVita	2:37
6.	"MAN IN THE SKY"	DeVita	GRAY (Gray), DeVita, min	Ahn Shin-ae	2:55

== Release ==
Project Y had its world premiere at the 2025 Toronto International Film Festival on September 10, 2025. It was also screened in the 'Korean Cinema Today - Special Premiere' section at the 30th Busan International Film Festival on September 18, 2025.

It was showcased in Stories of Women section of the 10th London East Asian Film Festival on October 25, 2025. It was also selected in the Competition strand along with other seven films, and it won the Best Film award in the competition.

The film was screened in the World Cinema Now section of the 37th Palm Springs International Film Festival on 2 January 2026.

The film is expected to be released in both South Korea and Japan simultaneously as per announcement made by the distributors Plus M Entertainment.

It was released in the Korean theatres on January 21, 2026.

== Reception ==
=== Box office ===
The film was released on January 21, 2026 on 781 screens.

As of February 8, 2026, the film has grossed US$939,590 from 140,504 admissions.

=== Accolades ===
Year	Award/Festival	Category	Recipient(s)	Result	Ref.
2025	The London East Asia Film Festival	Best Film	Project Y	Won	
