= Ugly Duckling Ms. Maeng =

Upcoming film by Lee Yong-jae

- Theatrical release poster
- Hangul: 수능, 출제의 비밀
- Lit.: CSAT, Secret of Exam Questions
- RR: Suneung, chuljeui bimil
- MR: Sunŭng, ch'ulcheŭi pimil
- Directed by: Lee Yong-jae
- Written by: Lee Yong-jae
- Starring: Lee Sun-bin; Yoo Jae-myung; Kim Young-min; Jeon Seok-ho
- Production companies: Joy Rabbit; Barunson E&A; KC Ventures
- Distributed by: By4M Studio; Barunson E&A
- Release dates: October 7, 2026 (BIFF); October 28, 2026 (South Korea)
- Running time: 99 minutes
- Country: South Korea
- Language: Korean

Ugly Duckling Ms. Maeng (Korean: 수능, 출제의 비밀) is a 2026 South Korean comedy film written and directed by Lee Yong-jae in his directorial debut. It stars Lee Sun-bin as the title character, along with Yoo Jae-myung, Kim Young-min, and Jeon Seok-ho. The film follows Maeng Bo-ram, a Korean language teacher who is unexpectedly selected for the CSAT question committee, a Level 2 state secret. It depicts her 40-day experience of isolation during the committee's secluded retreat.

It had its world premiere at the 31st Busan International Film Festival in October 2026 as part of the Korean Cinema Today - Panorama section. Distributed by By4M Studio and Barunson E&A, it was released theatrically in South Korea on October 28, 2026.

== Cast ==
- Lee Sun-bin as Maeng Bo-ram, a former frontline Korean language instructor who was appointed to the committee following an administrative error.
- Yoo Jae-myung as Moon Joo-yeol, chairman of the Korean Language Question Committee and a Seoul National University Department of Korean Language Education graduate.
- Kim Young-min as Park Kyung-tae, the Review Committee Chairman, whose qualifications are comparable to Joo-yeol's, with the exception of physical appearance.
- Jeon Seok-ho as Ki Jun-soo, an employee of the Korea Institute of Curriculum and Evaluation and Joo-yeol's right-hand man.

== Production ==
=== Development ===
Ugly Duckling Ms. Maeng is the directorial debut of Lee Yong-jae, writer of In Our Prime (2022) and Secret Zoo (2020), and is produced by Joy Rabbit, the production company behind In Our Prime. Director Lee Yong-jae said the film focuses on the CSAT question-setting process and a story spanning 40 days.

=== Casting ===
According to the film industry in February 2023, Lee Sun-bin and Yoo Jae-myung were cast to star. Lee Sun-bin, Yoo Jae-myung, Kim Young-min, and Jeon Seok-ho have been confirmed as the main cast.

=== Filming ===
Principal photography commenced on April 24, 2023. Filming concluded on June 21, 2023, following 35 shooting sessions over a period of three months.
