= Reunited Worlds =

South Korean television series

- Promotional poster
- Also known as: Into the New World; Into the World Again
- Hangul: 다시 만난 세계
- RR: Dasi mannan segye
- MR: Tasi mannan segye
- Genre: Fantasy; Romance; Melodrama
- Created by: Lee Yong-seok
- Written by: Lee Hee-myung
- Directed by: Baek Soo-chan
- Starring: Yeo Jin-goo; Lee Yeon-hee; Ahn Jae-hyun
- Composer: Park Se-joon
- Country of origin: South Korea
- Original language: Korean
- No. of episodes: 40

Production
- Executive producer: Lee Young-suk
- Cinematography: Hong Sung-kil; Lim Woo-shik; Heo Dae-sun
- Editor: Jang Shi-yun
- Camera setup: Single-camera
- Running time: 35 mins
- Production company: imTV

Original release
- Network: SBS
- Release: July 19 – September 21, 2017

Reunited Worlds (Korean: 다시 만난 세계) is a South Korean television series starring Yeo Jin-goo, Ahn Jae-hyun, and Lee Yeon-hee. It aired on SBS from July 19 to September 21, 2017, for 40 episodes.

== Plot ==
Sung Hae-sung (Yeo Jin-goo) is a senior high school student. On his birthday, his girlfriend Jung Jung-won (Jung Chae-yeon) prepares a surprise party for him at his house. To keep Hae-sung away while they set up, Jung-won asks him to go to their school and retrieve her wallet. There, he stumbles upon a shocking scene where a bully was found dead. While trying to get help, he is hit by a car and dies.

Twelve years later, Hae-sung mysteriously wakes up on the roof of his school building, unchanged as a 19-year-old, while everyone he knew has aged. He reunites with Jung-won (Lee Yeon-hee), who is now a 31-year-old woman, and with the help of his friends, he sets out to uncover the truth behind his death and his sudden resurrection.

As Hae-sung investigates, he discovers that after his death, he was accused of killing the bully. The real culprit was someone else, but Hae-sung was blamed, leaving his family and friends to suffer in the aftermath.

Realizing that his resurrection has a purpose, Hae-sung dedicates his time to making things right. He helps his siblings, who struggled after his death, and supports his best friend, who was deeply affected by the false accusations against him. However, he soon learns that his return to the world is only temporary. He was given this second chance not to live again, but to resolve the past. As he brings the truth to light and ensures justice is served, his presence begins to fade.

In a final farewell, Hae-sung shares final moments with his loved ones, including Jung-won. Though they love each other, they must accept that they now belong in different worlds. With a peaceful heart, Hae-sung disappears.

== Cast ==
=== Main ===
- Yeo Jin-goo as Sung Hae-sung (19-years-old)
- Lee Yeon-hee as Jung Jung-won (31-years-old)
  - Jung Chae-yeon as young Jung-won
- Ahn Jae-hyun as Cha Min-joon (34-years-old)

=== Recurring ===
==== Hae-sung and Jung-won's friends ====
- Shin Soo-ho as Kil Moon-shik (31-years-old)
  - Kim Min-sang as young Moon-shik

Electronic Service Center employee.

- Lee Si-eon as Shin Ho-bang (31-years-old)
  - Park Sung-joon as young Ho-bang

Police officer.

- Kim Jin-woo as Cha Tae-hoon (31-years-old)
  - Choi Soo-han as young Tae-hoon

The chief executive of a department store. Cha Min-joon's younger half-brother.

- Park Jin-joo as Hong Jin-joo (31-years-old)
  - Park Jin-soo as young Jin-joo

Roaming yoga instructor.

==== Hae-sung's siblings ====
- Yoon Sun-woo as Sung Young-joon (30-years-old)
  - Park Joon-mok as young Young-joon

Chest surgeon. Sung Hae-sung's younger step-brother.

- Kim Ga-eun as Sung Young-in (26-years-old)
  - Lee Young-eun as young Young-in

Employee in a clothing department store. Sung Hae-sung's younger step-sister.

- Kwak Dong-yeon as Sung Hae-chul (25-years-old)
  - Jeon Jin-seo as younger Hae-chul

Sung Gong-joo's father. Sung Hae-sung's real younger brother

- Kim Hye-jun as Sung Soo-ji (19-years-old)
  - Choi Yoo-ri as young Soo-ji

High school senior. Sung Hae-sung's younger half-sister.

==== Hae-sung's family ====
- Kim Han-na as Sung Gong-joo (6-years-old)

Sung Hae-sung's niece. Sung Hae-chul's daughter.

- Park Seung-tae as Kang Mal-yi (78-years-old)

Sung Hae-sung's grandmother.

==== Extended ====
- Park Yeong-gyu as Cha Kwon-pyo (65-years-old)

Cha Min-joon and Cha Tae-hoon's father. Cheongho High School Chairman.

- Bang Eun-hee as Yoon Mi-na (55-years-old)

Cha Tae-hoon's mother. Cha Kwon Pyo's second wife.

- Han So-hee as Lee Seo-won (27-years-old)

Sung Young-joon's girlfriend. Hospital Director's daughter. Fashion journalist.

- Kyeon Mi-ri as Son Myung-ok (55-years-old)

Lee Seo-won's mother.

- Kim Byung-se as Lee Gun-chul (58-years-old)

Lee Seo-won's father. Hospital director.

- Ahn Gil-kang as Ahn Tae-bok
- Lee Je-yeon as Yang Kyung-chul
- Kim Hee-jung as Nam Yoo-min

Sung Gong-joo's biological mother

- Min Joon-ho as Sous-chef (30-years-old)
- Choi Sung-min as Dong-hyun
- Ahn Sol-bin as Nam Soon-ji
- Kim Young-woong as Moneylender
- Bae Jin-woong as Moneylender
- Jung Wook
- Kim Dong-kyoon
- Baek Ji-won as Landlord
- Han Eun-seon
- Oh Jung-tae as Accessory salesman
- Park Hyun-sook as Cha Min-joon's maternal aunt
- Kang Sung-min as Park Dong-seok / Jason Park

=== Special appearances ===
- Seo Yi-sook as Jung Jung-won's mother
- Yoon Mi-ra as Lady Doh
- Jeon Gook-hwan as Ha Do-kwon

== Production ==
The series is the third collaboration between writer Lee Hee-myung and PD Baek Soo-chan, who worked on A Girl Who Sees Smells (2015) and Beautiful Gong Shim (2016).

== Original soundtrack ==
Reunited Worlds OST

Soundtrack album
- Genre: Soundtrack
- Languages: Korean, English
- Labels: SBS Contents Hub, VLENDING

=== Part 1 ===
No.	Title	Artists	Length
1.	"Waiting for You"	Jo Hyun-ah (Urban Zakapa)	03:51
2.	"Waiting for You" (Inst.)		03:51
Total length:			07:42

=== Part 2 ===
No.	Title	Artists	Length
1.	"You In Front of Me"	Taru	02:59
2.	"You In Front of Me" (Inst.)		02:59
Total length:			05:58

=== Part 3 ===
No.	Title	Artists	Length
1.	"Sad Heart"	SE O	03:00
2.	"Sad Heart" (Inst.)		03:00
Total length:			06:00

=== Part 4 ===
No.	Title	Artists	Length
1.	"We Will Meet Again"	Yun DDanDDan	03:47
2.	"We Will Meet Again" (Inst.)		03:47
Total length:			07:34

=== Part 5 ===
No.	Title	Artists	Length
1.	"Oh!My God!"	Kim So-hee	03:29
2.	"Oh!My God!" (Inst.)		03:29
Total length:			06:58

=== Part 6 ===
No.	Title	Artists	Length
1.	"Don't Worry"	Yoo Seung-woo	03:34
2.	"Don't Worry" (Inst.)		03:34
Total length:			07:08

=== Part 7 ===
No.	Title	Artists	Length
1.	"Kiss Me"	SE O	03:17
2.	"Kiss Me" (Inst.)		03:17
Total length:			06:34

== Ratings ==
- In the table above, the blue numbers represent the lowest ratings and the red numbers represent the highest ratings.
- NR denotes that the drama did not rank in the top 20 daily programs on that date

Ep.	Date	Average audience share			
Ep.	Date	TNmS		AGB Nielsen	
Ep.	Date	Nationwide	Seoul	Nationwide	Seoul
1	July 19, 2017	5.5% (NR)	6.3% (NR)	6.0% (NR)	6.8%(18th)
2	July 19, 2017	6.6% (NR)	7.9% (14th)	7.5% (16th)	8.6% (9th)
3	July 20, 2017	6.1% (NR)	7.1% (18th)	6.0% (NR)	6.7% (18th)
4	July 20, 2017	6.8% (20th)	8.2% (13th)	7.2% (15th)	8.1% (10th)
5	July 26, 2017	6.7% (NR)	7.0% (19th)	6.3% (NR)	7.2% (16th)
6	July 26, 2017	8.2% (14th)	9.0% (8th)	7.5% (13th)	8.3% (12th)
7	July 27, 2017	6.2% (NR)	7.1% (NR)	7.2% (16th)	8.2% (12th)
8	July 27, 2017	6.9% (NR)	7.4% (18th)	8.0% (12th)	8.7% (10th)
9	August 2, 2017	6.3% (19th)	6.9% (17th)	6.6% (18th)	8.0% (11th)
10	August 2, 2017	7.2% (14th)	7.6% (13th)	7.9% (11th)	9.3% (5th)
11	August 3, 2017	6.3% (NR)	7.0% (17th)	6.7% (NR)	7.7% (17th)
12	August 3, 2017	6.2% (NR)	7.4% (NR)	7.5% (17th)	8.8% (10th)
13	August 9, 2017	5.4% (NR)	5.6% (NR)	5.5% (NR)	5.7% (NR)
14	August 9, 2017	6.0% (NR)	6.5% (16th)	6.5% (20th)	7.1% (17th)
15	August 10, 2017	6.6% (NR)	6.7% (20th)	6.2% (NR)	6.6% (19th)
16	August 10, 2017	6.9% (20th)	7.2% (17th)	7.0% (NR)	7.5% (16th)
17	August 16, 2017	4.9% (NR)	5.4% (NR)	6.4% (NR)	6.9% (16th)
18	August 16, 2017	5.7% (NR)	6.0% (NR)	6.8% (19th)	7.1% (15th)
19	August 17, 2017	6.2% (NR)	6.5% (20th)	6.7% (19th)	7.0% (15th)
20	August 17, 2017	6.6% (19th)	6.6% (19th)	7.5% (13th)	7.8% (13th)
21	August 23, 2017	5.4% (NR)	5.5% (NR)	5.6% (NR)	5.7% (NR)
22	August 23, 2017	6.2% (NR)	7.0% (NR)	6.7% (20th)	7.5% (16th)
23	August 24, 2017	6.3% (NR)	6.8% (NR)	5.9% (NR)	6.4% (NR)
24	August 24, 2017	6.6% (19th)	6.5% (19th)	7.1% (19th)	7.7% (17th)
25	August 30, 2017	5.3% (NR)	5.7% (NR)	5.4% (NR)	5.8% (NR)
26	August 30, 2017	6.2% (NR)	6.7% (16th)	6.8% (18th)	6.8% (17th)
27	August 31, 2017	4.6% (NR)	5.1% (NR)	6.3% (NR)	6.8% (NR)
28	August 31, 2017	5.0% (NR)	5.4% (NR)	6.5% (NR)	6.9% (NR)
29	September 6, 2017	5.5% (NR)	6.4% (18th)	5.1% (NR)	5.3% (NR)
30	September 6, 2017	6.1% (NR)	6.2% (19th)	6.6% (18th)	7.4% (14th)
31	September 7, 2017	5.2% (NR)	6.3% (19th)	5.7% (20th)	6.5% (18th)
32	September 7, 2017	5.7% (NR)	6.5% (17th)	6.4% (17th)	7.1% (14th)
33	September 13, 2017	5.0% (NR)	5.5% (19th)	4.5% (NR)	5.5% (NR)
34	September 13, 2017	5.6% (20th)	6.2% (16th)	5.8% (18th)	6.4% (14th)
35	September 14, 2017	5.2% (NR)	6.0% (20th)	5.3% (NR)	5.9% (NR)
36	September 14, 2017	6.5% (19th)	7.4% (14th)	6.1% (20th)	6.8% (15th)
37	September 20, 2017	5.7% (NR)	5.4% (20th)	5.4% (NR)	6.0% (17th)
38	September 20, 2017	6.6% (18th)	6.7% (17th)	6.6% (16th)	7.5% (13th)
39	September 21, 2017	5.3% (NR)	6.4% (16th)	6.1% (20th)	6.2% (18th)
40	September 21, 2017	6.0% (20th)	6.9% (14th)	6.7% (17th)	7.0% (13th)
Average		6.04%	6.61%	6.44%	7.08%
