= Jeon Jin-seo =

South Korean actor (born 2006)

- Born: May 28, 2006 (age 20); South Korea
- Education: Chung-Ang University
- Occupation: Actor
- Years active: 2012–present
- Agent: Peak J Entertainment

Korean name
- Hangul: 전진서
- RR: Jeon Jinseo
- MR: Chŏn Chinsŏ
- Website

Jeon Jin-seo (Korean: 전진서; born May 28, 2006) is a South Korean actor. He began his career as a child actor, with his debut in MBC TV's Can't Live Without You (2012). He is best known for his roles in Graceful Family (2019) and The World of the Married (2020).

== Career ==
In 2023, Jeon signed an exclusive contract with Enter7. In 2025, Jeon signed an exclusive contract with Peak J Entertainment.

== Filmography ==
=== Film ===
Year	Title	Role	Notes	Ref.
2018	Illang: The Wolf Brigade	Yoon-hee's younger brother		

=== Television series ===
Year	Title	Role	Notes	Ref.
2012	Can't Live Without You	young Chi Do-kim	Acting debut	
2012	Only Because It's You	Seo Tae-yang		
2013	The Heirs	child Kim Tan		
2013–2014	One Warm Word	Yoo Hye-joon		
2013–2014	My Love from the Star	child Cheon Yoon-jae		
2014	Bride of the Century	young Choi Gang-ju		
2014	Mama	Seo Hyun-soo		
2014	Bad Guys	Kim Young-joon		
2014	KBS Drama Special: The End of That Summer	Kim Cho-rok		
2014–2015	Cheongdam-dong Scandal	child Jang Seo-joon		
2015	My Unfortunate Boyfriend	child Yoon Tae-woon		
2015	Splendid Politics	Grand Prince Yeongchang		
2015	Mask	child Choi Min-woo		
2015–2016	My Daughter, Geum Sa-wol	young Chan Bin-kang		
2015–2016	Six Flying Dragons	Eun-ho		
2016	Happy Home	Seo Young-woo		
2016	Cinderella with Four Knights	young Kang Hyung-min		
2016	The Legend of the Blue Sea	young Heo Joon-jae		
2017	Bad Thief, Good Thief	young Lee Yun-ho		
2017	My Sassy Girl	young Gyun-woo		
2017	Reunited Worlds	young Sung Hae-chul		
2018	Grand Prince	young Lee Hwi / Prince Eun-sung		
2018	Mr. Sunshine	young Eugene Choi		
2019	Graceful Family	Mo Seo-jin		
2019	The Tale of Nokdu			
2020	The World of the Married	Lee Jun-yeong		
2020–2021	The Dolphin in the Little Mermaid	Jun-seo		
2024	Begins ≠ Youth	Jeon Jae-ha		
2025	Law and the City	Moon Chan-yeong		
