= Lee Hak-joo =

South Korean actor (born 1989)

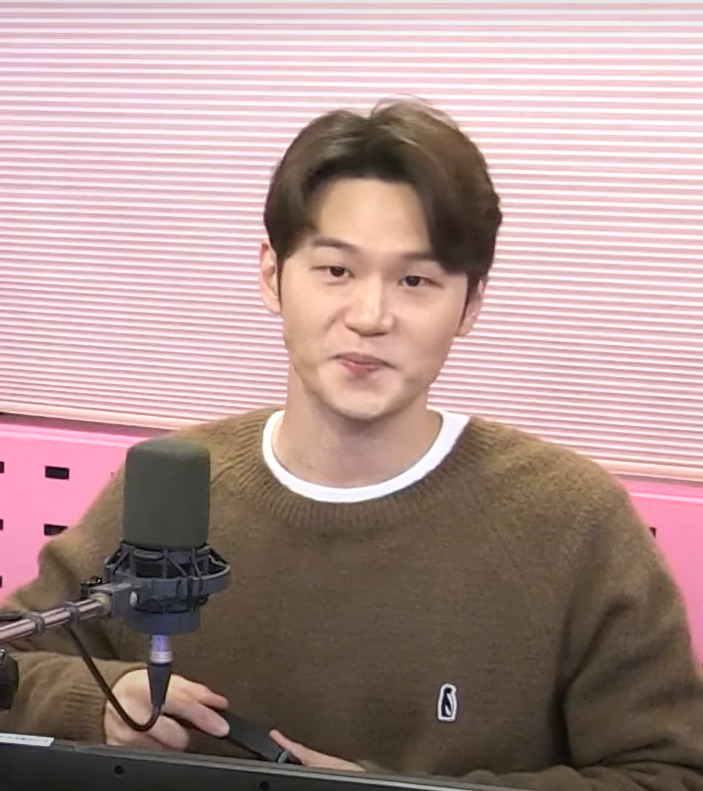
- Lee in November 2021
- Born: January 9, 1989 (age 37); South Korea
- Other name: Lee Hak-ju
- Education: Hanyang University
- Occupation: Actor
- Years active: 2012–present
- Agent: SM Culture & Contents

Korean name
- Hangul: 이학주
- Hanja: 李學周
- RR: I Hakju
- MR: I Hakchu

Lee Hak-joo (born January 9, 1989) is a South Korean actor. He is best known for his roles in the television series The World of the Married (2020) and My Name (2021).

== Personal life ==
On September 13, 2022, Lee's agency announced that he will marry his girlfriend in November. They married on November 6, 2022.

== Filmography ==
Key
†	Denotes films that have not yet been released

=== Film ===
Year	Title	Role	Notes	Ref.
2012	Sweet Sorrow		Short film	
2013	I Know You		Short film	
2013	12th Assistant Deacon	Choi Seung-ho	Short film	
2014	The Girl		Short film	
2014	End of Travel		Short film	
2014	The Sauna		Short film	
2015	The Shameless	Sung-chul		
2015	A Crevice of Violence	Choong-hee	Short film	
2015	Shame Diary	Hee-soo	Short film	
2016	Insane	Han Dong-shik		
2016	Woo-joo in the Others	Hak-joo	Short film	
2016	Teach Me	Seo Joon-yeol	Short film	
2017	Snowy Road	Soldier		
2017	Jane	Jung-ho	Cameo	
2017	Autumn Sonata	Im-joon		
2017	Where Nobody Can Go	Ho-jae	Short film	
2018	Remains	Hyung-joon	Short film	
2018	Golden Slumber	Detective		
2018	Marionette	Kim Dong-jin		
2018	The Negotiation	Park Min-woo		
2019	Hit-and-Run Squad	Karuma		
2019	Watching	Joon-ho		
2020	Welcome to the Guesthouse	Joon-geun		
2020	The Girl Who Ran	Do-young	Short film	
2020	Some Relationship		Short film	
2020	In an Unnamed Cafe		Short film	
2021	Sinkhole	Deputy Jung		
2022	Decision to Leave	Lee Ji-gu		

=== Television series ===
Year	Title	Role	Notes	Ref.
2015	Snowy Road	Soldier		
2015	Oh My Ghost	Shin Kyung-mo		
2015	Drama Special – Fake Family	Lee Min-soo	One act-drama	
2016	Squad 38	Ahn Chang-ho		
2016	Drama Special – Disqualified Laughter	Do-sik	One act-drama	
2017	Super Family 2017	Choi Joon-woo	Cameo; Episode 12	
2018	Mr. Sunshine	Kim Ahn-pyung (young)	Cameo; Episode 1	
2018	Drama Special – Dreamers	Ji-wook	One act-drama	
2018–2019	Memories of the Alhambra	Kim Sang-bum		
2019	Justice	Ma Dong-hyuk		
2019	Be Melodramatic	Noh Seung-hyo	Guest role; Episodes 1, 4, 15	
2020	The World of the Married	Park In-kyu		
2020	Sweet Munchies	Kang Tae-wan		
2020	Private Lives	Kim Myung-hyun		
2021–2022	Artificial City	Han Dong-min		
2022	O'PENing – Shared Office Hookup	Park Hyeon-woo	Season 5	
2023	My Dearest	Nam Yeon-joon		
2024	Parole Examiner Lee	Ji Myeong-seob		
2025	Newtopia	Sung Tae-sik / Alex		
2025	The Potato Lab	Park Ki-se		
2025	Beyond the Bar	Lee Jin-woo		
2026	Fifties Professionals †	Ma Gong-bok		

=== Web series ===
Year	Title	Role	Notes	Ref.
2016	Tong: Memories	Lee Jung-woo		
2021	My Name	Jung Tae-joo		
2021	Political Fever	Kim Soo-jin		
2022–2023	Shadow Detective	Son Kyung-cheon	Season 1–2	
2024	LTNS	Jeong-su		
2026	Portraits of Delusion	TBA		

== Awards and nominations ==
Name of the award ceremony, year presented, category, nominee of the award, and the result of the nomination
Award ceremony	Year	Category	Nominee / Work	Result	Ref.
APAN Star Awards	2021	Best New Actor	The World of the Married	Nominated	
Asiana International Short Film Festival	2014	Face in Short	12th Assistant Deacon	Won	
Baeksang Arts Awards	2022	Best Supporting Actor – Television	Political Fever	Nominated	
Blue Dragon Film Awards	2021	Best New Actor	Welcome to the Guesthouse	Nominated	
Blue Dragon Series Awards	2022	Best Supporting Actor	Political Fever	Won	
Korea Culture Entertainment Awards	2020	Excellence Award, Actor in a Drama	The World of the Married	Won	
