= Ittihad University =

Coordinates: 25.774600°N 55.926027°E

- Type: Private
- Established: 1999
- President: Dr. Sheikh Sultan bin Kayed Al Qasimi
- Location: Ras Al Khaimah (RAK), United Arab Emirates
- Campus: Urban
- Website: www.iu.ae

Ittihad University (IU) was a private university in the emirate of Ras Al Khaimah (RAK), United Arab Emirates. It was the first degree-granting institution of higher education to open in Ras Al Khaimah and was supported by Sheikh Saud Bin Saqr Al-Qassimi, the ruler of Ras Al Khaimah Emirate. It was licensed by the Commission for Academic Accreditation, Ministry of Higher Education and Scientific Research United Arab Emirates.

Ittihad University closed in about 2016. The university building is now used by the RAK campus of Birmingham City University.
