= That Girl (Jung Yong-hwa song) =

Single by Jung Yong-hwa featuring Loco

from the EP Do Disturb
- Language: Korean
- Released: July 19, 2017
- Recorded: 2017
- Studio: FNC Entertainment Studio (Seoul)
- Genre: Dance-pop
- Length: 3:28
- Label: FNC Entertainment
- Songwriters: Jung Yong-hwa; Loco; TJ Routon; Jarah Gibson

Jung Yong-hwa singles chronology
"Home Alone" (2017)	"That Girl" (2017)

Loco singles chronology
"D.O.P.E." (2017)	"That Girl" (2017)	"Summer Go Loco" (2017)

"That Girl" (Korean: 여자여자해; RR: Yeojayeojahae; lit. '"Girly Girl"') is a song by South Korean musician Jung Yong-hwa of CNBLUE featuring rapper Loco. It was released on July 19, 2017, through FNC Entertainment and distributed by LOEN Entertainment. A dance-pop song, it serves as the lead single to the Jung's second mini-album Do Disturb (2017).

"That Girl" and its music video were concurrently released. Jung promoted the song on various music chart shows, and it peaked at number 77 on South Korea's national Gaon Digital Chart. The track was complimented for its music, but widely criticized for its lyrics.

== Background and composition ==
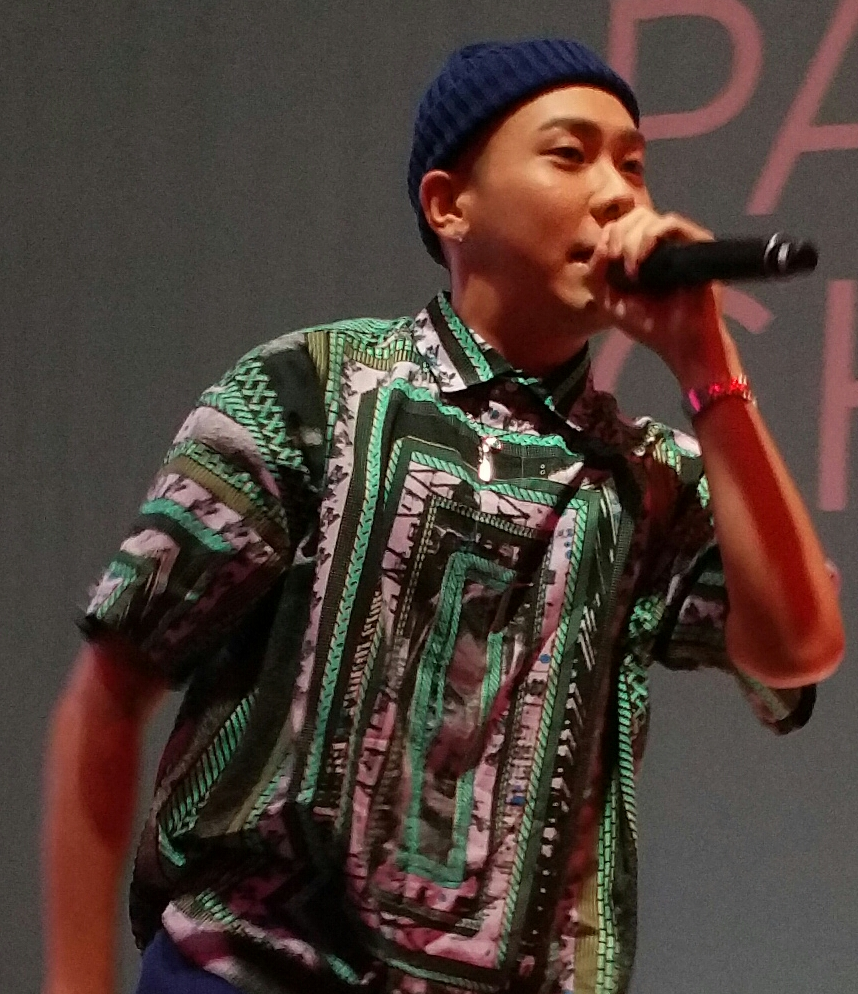
Loco provides lyrics and a rap on the track

"That Girl" was written by Jung and Loco, composed by the former alongside TJ Routon and Jarah Gibson of 80HDMuzik, and arranged by Routon. It is a "funky" dance-pop track with an undercurrent of reggae elements, and it "emphasizes the melody through simple sound sources". The song harmonizes Jung's "overflowing, groovy" vocals with Loco's "light" rap.

Jung recorded the song in studio alongside Routon and Gibson within three days. Jung described the process as "fooling around"; he played the guitar, while another played the drums and piano. They input their ideas into a computer and wrote the song that same day. Jung felt that the song was a challenge which required him to learn how to dance. He felt it would be unnatural to stand and sing the song, but also felt playing the guitar "would be a little awkward". He enlisted the help of a choreographer to create a dance for the track.

== Release and promotion ==
"That Girl" was announced as the lead single of Do Disturb on July 5, 2017, along with Loco's featured appearance. Three days later, FNC Entertainment released a lyric spoiler poster. A concept trailer entitled "Let U In" for the single was unveiled on July 11. On July 17, a music video trailer for "That Girl" was released. The trailer and music video for "That Girl" was filmed together in a span of two days. Released on July 19, it features a cameo by comedian Park Soo-hong. Two days later, a dance practice version was released.

From July 20, Jung began promoted "That Girl" by performing the song on weekly music chart shows, including Mnet's M Countdown, Korean Broadcasting System's (KBS) Music Bank, Munhwa Broadcasting Corporation's (MBC) Show! Music Core, Seoul Broadcasting System's (SBS) Inkigayo, and MBC Music's Show Champion.

== Commercial performance ==
On the charted dated July 16 – 22, 2017, "That Girl" debuted at number 77 on South Korea's national Gaon Digital Chart, selling 26,909 downloads in its first week.

== Critical reception ==
"That Girl" was widely criticized for its lyrics, which critics claimed reinforced gender stereotypes of femininity. Writing for online magazine IZM, Jung Min-jae described "That Girl" as a "well-made pop tune", citing its ability to "stick to your ears and let you hum it right away after just a few listens". He called the use of the neologism "yeojayeojahae" ("girly girl") a "blunder" for its "narrow expression". Shimdyang of Idology labeled it a "problematic song", which has a "nice groovy summer tune" if the lyrics are disregarded.

== Charts ==
Chart (2017)	Peak position
Gaon Digital Chart	77
Gaon Mobile Chart	25
