= Kim Young-min (actor) =

South Korean actor (born 1971)

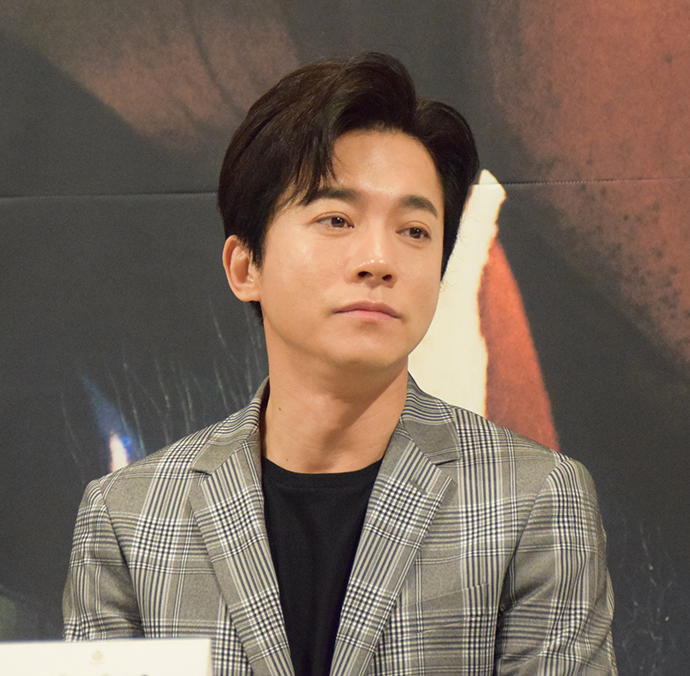
- Kim in 2019
- Born: 5 November 1971 (age 54); Seoul, South Korea
- Occupation: Actor
- Years active: 2001–present
- Agent: Management Play

Korean name
- Hangul: 김영민
- Hanja: 金永敏
- RR: Gim Yeongmin
- MR: Kim Yŏngmin

Kim Young-min (Korean: 김영민; born 5 November 1971) is a South Korean actor. He is best known for his roles in television series My Mister (2018), Crash Landing on You (2019), The World of the Married (2020), and Military Prosecutor Doberman (2022).

== Filmography ==
=== Film ===
Year	Title	Role	Ref.
2001	Address Unknown	Ji-Hum	
2003	Spring, Summer, Fall, Winter... and Spring		
2003	My Right to Ravage Myself	Dong-shik	
2006	A Cruel Attendance	Sleet goblin	
2006	Ad-lib Night	Ki-yeong	
2008	Viva! Love	Gu-sang	
2008	My Dear Enemy	Dae-hee	
2009	The Sword with No Name	Gojong	
2009	Kill Me	Director Min	
2011	Sorry and Thank You	Young-jin	
2011	White: Melody of Death	Lee Tae-yong	
2011	Perfect Game	Kang Sung-tae	
2013	Hwayi: A Monster Boy	Jung-min	
2014	Murderer		
2014	One on One	Oh Hyeon	
2015	Madonna	Kim Sang-woo	
2015	Memories of the Sword	Wang	
2016	Love, Lies	Producer (special appearance)	
2016	The Net		
2016	Murder at Honeymoon Hotel		
2017	Warriors of the Dawn	Messenger	
2019	I will Become Big	Prison guard	
2019	Between the Seasons	Hyun-woo	
2020	Lucky Chan-sil	Jang Gook-young	
2020	A French Woman	Hwang Seong-woo	
2022	Take Care of My Mom	Jong-wook	
2022	A Christmas Carol	Cho Soon-woo	
2026	Portrait of a Family	Lee Seong-myung	
2026	Ugly Duckling Ms. Maeng	Park Kyung-tae	

=== Television series ===
Year	Title	Role	Notes	Ref.
2008	Woman of Matchless Beauty, Park Jung-geum	Mr. Choi		
2008	Beethoven Virus	Jung Myung-hwan		
2016	Fantastic	Choi Jin-tae		
2018	My Mister	Do Joon-young		
2018	Hide and Seek	Moon Jae-sang		
2019	Save Me 2	Sung Chul-woo		
2019	Crash Landing on You	Jung Man-bok		
2020	The World of the Married	Son Je-hyuk		
2020	Private Lives	Kim Jae-wook		
2022	Military Prosecutor Doberman	Yong Moon-goo		
2022	Curtain Call	Ri Young-hoon	Cameo	
2024	Queen of Tears	Yong-song		
2026	Doctor X: Mafia in White	Do Yun-sik		

== Stage ==
Theater play performances
Year	Title		Role	Theater	Date	Ref.
Year	English	Korean	Role	Theater	Date	Ref.
1999	Na Un-gyu	나운규		Theatre Physics Arts Centre Small Theatre		
1999	It's small to get away from me	내게서 멀어지는 것은 작다		Batangol Gallery (STUDIO Duru-chan)		
2000	Lady Macbeth	레이디 멕베스	Sijong	Arts Centre Free Small Theatre (Theatre Physical)		
2001	Bae Jang-hwa Bae Hong-ryun	배장화 배홍련	Bae Jang-soo	Seoul Arts Centre Small Theatre (Theatre Company Physics)		
2002	Onion	양파	Son	Theatre View, Batanggol Theatre		
2002	Lady Macbeth	레이디 멕베스	Sijong	Theatre Physics, Arts Centre Free Small Theatre		
2003	Roberto Zuco	로베르토 주코	Boys	Theatre Company 76, National Theatre		
2003	Pursing	추적		Theatre Party Arts Centre Free Small Theatre		
2004	Sunday Seoul	썬데이서울	Byeongho	Theatre Company Alley Daehak-ro Installation Theatre Jeong Mi-so		
2004	19 그리고 80	19 그리고 80	Harold	Daehanro Setting Theater Jeongmiso	9 January 2004 – 29 February 2004	
2004	Hamlet	햄릿	Hamlet	Dongguk University Dongseung Hall	23 April 2004 – 30 May 2004	
2004	Theater Series - Youth Praise	연극열전 - 청춘예찬	Young Yeong-min	Dongsung Arts Center Small Theater	2 October 2004 – 14 November 2004	
2004	Sunday Seoul	선데이 서울	Byeongho	Seongju Culture and Arts Centre	4 December	
2005	Youth Praise	청춘예찬	Young	Black Box Theater	4 January 2005 – 27 February 2005	
2005	Equus	에쿠우스	Alan Strang	Hakjeon Blue Small Theatre	9 September 2005 – 30 October 2005	
2005	Carmen	카르멘	Don José	Universal Art Centre	2 June 2005 – 19 June 2005	
2007	Bad Magnet	나쁜자석	Min-ho	Doosan Art Centre Space111	20 October 2007 – 25 December 2007	
2008	Applause for Julie	줄리에게 박수를	Hamlet (Seokdong)	Doosan Art Center Space111	8 March – 5 May	
2009	Rain Man	레인맨	Charlie Babbit	CJ Ajit Daehak-ro (formerly SM Art Hall)	24 April 2009 – 2 August 2009	
2009	My Brother in Unhyeon Palace	운현궁 오라버니	-	Namsan Arts Centre	4 December 2009 – 13 December 2009	
2010	Amy	에이미	Dominic	Arko Arts Theatre Small Theatre	5 February 2010 – 21 February 2010	
2010	Shoot My Heart	내 심장을 쏴라	-	Namsan Arts Centre Drama Centre	7 October 2010 – 24 October 2010	
2010	Amy - Daejeon	에이미 - 대전	Toby	Daejeon Arts Centre Ensemble Hall	29 April 2010 – 1 May 2010	
2010–2011	Don Quixote	돈키호테	Cardenio	Myeongdong Arts Theatre	10 December 2010 – 2 January 2011	
2012	M. Butterfly	연극열전4 - M.Butterfly	Rene Gallimard	Sejong Centre for the Performing Arts M Theatre	24 April 2012 – 6 June 2012	
2013	Father in the Sheath	칼집 속에 아버지	Galmae	National Theater Company, Baek Sung-hee, Jang Min-ho Theater	26 April 2013 – 12 May 2013	
2015	M. Butterfly	M.Butterfly	Rene Gallimard	Doosan Art Centre Yeongang Hall	11 April 2015 – 7 June 2015	
2015	Slightly Falling Over and Getting Hit	살짝 넘어갔다가 얻어맞았다	Soo-cheol	LG Art Centre	5 November 2015 – 18 November 2015	
2015	The Best Play 6 - Army on the Tree	연극열전6 - 나무 위의 군대	Squad leader	Seoul Arts Center Open Theater	19 December 2015 – 28 February 2016	
2017	Hemwoo	혈우	Choi Eui	Daehak-ro Arts Theatre Grand Theatre	11 February 2017 – 26 February 2017	

== Awards and nominations ==
Name of the award ceremony, year presented, category, nominee of the award, and the result of the nomination
Award ceremony	Year	Category	Nominee / Work	Result	Ref.
APAN Star Awards	2021	Best Supporting Actor	Crash Landing on You, The World of the Married	Won	
Baeksang Arts Awards	2020	Best Supporting Actor – Film	Lucky Chan-sil	Nominated	
Baeksang Arts Awards	2020	Best Supporting Actor – Television	The World of the Married	Nominated	
Grand Bell Awards	2008	Best New Actor	Viva! Love	Nominated	
MBC Drama Awards	2018	Excellence Award, Actor in a Weekend Special Project	Hide and Seek	Nominated	
