= Soo-kyung =

- Hangul: 수경
- RR: Sugyeong
- MR: Sugyŏng

Soo-kyung, also spelled Soo-kyeong or Su-kyung, is a Korean given name.

People with this name include:

Arts and literature

- Sumi Jo (born Jo Soo-kyung, 1962), South Korean female opera singer
- Heo Su-gyeong (born 1964), South Korean male poet
- SEO (artist) (born Seo Soo-kyoung, 1977), South Korean female painter
- Sue Son (Korean name Son Sue-kyung; born 1985), South Korean-born British female violinist
- Hong Soo-kyung, South Korean female cellist, member of the Trio con Brio Copenhagen

Entertainers

- Jeon Soo-kyung (born 1966), South Korean theatre and film actress
- Lee Soo-kyung (born 1982), South Korean actress
- Yoon Jin-seo (born Yoon Soo-kyung, 1983), South Korean actress
- Lee Soo-kyung (actress, born 1996), South Korean actress
- Ri Su-kyong, North Korean female singer, member of Moranbong Band

Sportspeople

- Yoon Soo-kyung (born 1964), South Korean female handball player
- Ha Su-gyeong (born 1969), South Korean female swimmer
- Kim Soo-kyung (baseball) (born 1979), South Korean male baseball pitcher
- Kim Soo-kyung (weightlifter) (born 1985), South Korean female weightlifter
- Ahn Soo-kyeong (born 1987), South Korean female sport shooter

Others

- Lim Su-kyung (born 1968), South Korean female politician

== See also ==
- List of Korean given names
