= The World of the Married =

2020 South Korean television series

- Promotional poster
- Also known as: A World of Married Couple; The World of a Married Couple
- Hangul: 부부의 세계
- Hanja: 夫婦의 世界
- Lit.: Couple's World
- RR: Bubuui segye
- MR: Pubuŭi segye
- Genre: Melodrama; Romance; Family drama; Psychological thriller
- Created by: Kang Eun-kyung; Mike Bartlett
- Based on: Doctor Foster by Mike Bartlett
- Developed by: Mike Bartlett
- Written by: Mike Bartlett; Joo Hyun
- Directed by: Mo Wan-il; Kim Sung-jin (Note: Kim Sung-jin is an assistant director. All directing credits would still go to Mo Wan-il.)
- Starring: Kim Hee-ae; Park Hae-joon; Han So-hee; Park Sun-young; Kim Young-min
- Music by: Gaemi
- Opening theme: "Finale" by Park Mi-sun
- Country of origin: South Korea
- Original language: Korean
- No. of episodes: 16 + 2 specials

Production
- Executive producers: Park Joon-seo; Kim Ji-yeon; Kim Se-ah
- Producers: Kim Ye-ji; Park Woo-ram
- Cinematography: Jang Jong-kyung; Kwon Byung-soo
- Editors: Han Ji-woo; Jeon Yoon-young
- Camera setup: Single-camera
- Running time: 75–92 minutes
- Production companies: JTBC Studios; BBC Studios

Original release
- Network: JTBC
- Release: March 27 – May 16, 2020

The World of the Married (Korean: 부부의 세계) is a South Korean television series starring Kim Hee-ae, Park Hae-joon, and Han So-hee. Based on BBC One's drama series Doctor Foster written by Mike Bartlett, it tells a story of a married couple whose betrayal of one another leads to a whirlwind of revenge, grief, forgiveness and healing. It aired on JTBC on Fridays and Saturdays from March 27 to May 16, 2020.

With its final episode reaching a nationwide rating of 28.371%, the series became the highest-rated drama in Korean cable television history, overtaking Sky Castle. It also recorded the highest average rating for a drama on cable television, with an average rating of 18.829%. Although the series was criticized for its portrayal of sex and violence, it received critical acclaim for its screenplay, direction and acting performances, with Mo Wan-il winning Best Director and Kim Hee-ae winning Best Actress at the 56th Baeksang Arts Awards.

== Plot ==
Ji Seon-u (Kim Hee-ae), a revered family medicine doctor and associate director at Family Love Hospital in Gosan, South Korea, believes she has a perfect life with her aspiring director husband Lee Tae-oh (Park Hae-joon) and their son Lee Jun-yeong (Jeon Jin-seo). However, her world shatters when she discovers Tae-oh's affair with the young and attractive Yeo Da-kyung (Han So-hee). Shocked and betrayed, Seon-u decides to divorce and meticulously plans her revenge.

After the divorce, Seon-u identifies Tae-oh's financial status and puts him on the verge of bankruptcy, revealing his affair to Da-kyung's parents. Tae-oh and Da-kyung eventually get married, but Tae-oh's dishonest behavior and lies destabilize their relationship. Seon-u tries to reorganize her life and restore her relationship with her son, Jun-yeong. However, Tae-oh is still obsessed with Seon-u and tries to ruin her life. Eventually, Tae-oh ends up in a catastrophe and also breaks up with Da-kyung.

The drama ends with Seon-u overcoming her wounds and getting back on her feet.

== Cast and characters ==
- Kim Hee-ae as Ji Seon-u
- Park Hae-joon as Lee Tae-oh
- Han So-hee as Yeo Da-kyung
- Park Sun-young as Go Ye-rim
- Kim Young-min as Son Je-hyuk
- Chae Gook-hee as Seol Myung-suk
- Lee Geung-young as Yeo Byung-gyu
- Kim Sun-kyung as Uhm Hyo-jung
- Jeon Jin-seo as Lee Jun-yeong
- Shim Eun-woo as Min Hyun-seo
- Jung Jae-soon as Bae Jung-shim
- Lee Hak-joo as Park In-Gyu
- Lee Moo-saeng as Kim Yoon-gi
- Seo Yi-sook as Chairman Choi's wife

== Episodes ==
No.	Title	Directed by	Written by	Original release date
1	"Episode 1"	Mo Wan-il & Kim Sung-jin	Joo Hyun; Mike Bartlett	27 March 2020
Ji Seon-u works as a doctor at Family Love Hospital and is happily married to aspiring film director Lee Tae-oh. Together they have a teenage son, Lee Jun-yeong. One day, she finds a reddish strand of hair on Tae-oh's scarf and suspects him of infidelity. Paranoid about the findings, Seon-u tries investigating Tae-oh, who behaves abnormally and lies about his work hours. On Tae-oh's birthday, Seon-u tries searching his car to find more evidence. In the trunk, she finds a phone with a background picture of a young woman, Da-kyung, who has the same hair colour as the strand found on Tae-oh's scarf. In the phone gallery, she finds photos of a joint vacation of them alongside Seon-u's neighbors Go Ye-rim and Son Je-hyuk. Feeling betrayed, she grabs a pair of scissors and heads towards Tae-oh.
2	"Episode 2"	Mo Wan-il & Kim Sung-jin	Joo Hyun; Mike Bartlett	28 March 2020
Seon-u imagines stabbing Tae-oh with a scissor, but she backs out of the idea last minute. In a spur of anger, she throws Tae-oh's belongings in a suitcase and is ready to kick him out, only for him to arrive home drunk. Moreover, Jun-yeong's close relationship with his father stresses her even more. The next day, Da-kyung visits Family Love Hospital and is treated by Seon-u against her will. When asked about her sex life, Da-kyung reveals that she knows her boyfriend (Tae-oh) is married, and that he is unhappy with his marriage. Da-kyung's pregnancy test returns positive; she seeks abortion to gynecologist Dr. Seol Myung-suk and begs her not to tell Tae-oh. Meanwhile, Seon-u goes to a bar where one of her patients Min Hyun-seo works at, but she has been off-duty for some time, as she has been in an abusive relationship with Park In-gyu. Seon-u succeeds in rescuing Hyun-seo, who declines to leave In-gyu, believing that he is simply venting out his anger on his early life. In exchange for her prescription medicine, Seon-u asks her to spy on Tae-oh and Da-Kyung at her home. The next day, Seon-u texts Myung-suk to tell Tae-oh about Da-kyung's pregnancy.
3	"Episode 3"	Mo Wan-il & Kim Sung-jin	Joo Hyun; Mike Bartlett	3 April 2020
Tae-oh discovers Da-kyung's pregnancy, he lets her decide on the baby's fate. Da-kyung wants Tae-oh to stop concealing their relationship; she will call him whenever she wants to. Tae-oh expresses frustration on whom he should keep. Seon-u starts a consulting session on divorce where her lawyer requests material evidence on Tae-oh's infidelity, but warns that tailing is illegal. Seon-u sees Da-kyung buying an encyclopedia on parenting. She tells her that Tae-oh will supposedly confess the infidelity to his wife in 2 months and file for divorce afterwards. Seon-u checks Tae-oh's financial record: turns out he has been borrowing mortgage loans, and that he got a premium loan from Jun-yeong's variable life insurance, in addition to hidden bills in millions of won. During a visit to Tae-oh's mother, Seon-u's plan to destroy his life gives her a fatal cardiac arrest. Amidst the funeral, Seon-u sees Tae-oh making out with Da-kyung in her car whilst playing a cover of "My One and Only Love", which Tae-oh also played when proposing to Seon-u. Hyun-seo, hired by Seon-u as a spy, disguises herself as Da-kyung's neighbor to find out more about the infidelity.
4	"Episode 4"	Mo Wan-il & Kim Sung-jin	Joo Hyun; Mike Bartlett	4 April 2020
Seon-u requests her lawyer to draw up a divorce settlement that would hand her over all of Tae-oh's money from his bank account. During a thunderstorm, while searching for Tae-oh's secret phone in his car, Seon-u is offered an umbrella by Je-hyuk. Da-kyung's mother and father, Uhm Hyo-jung and Yeo Byung-gyu, find out that Da-kyung has been dating a man. Seon-u finds out that Myung-suk has been two-faced all along by passing on her suspicion to Tae-oh to help cover his affair. Tae-oh suspiciously leaves "for work" at night; Hyun-seo tracks him again, however In-gyu stands in her way and stages a scene; which leads to them to see Tae-oh open Da-kyung's door. The next day at the hospital, In-gyu reveals to Seon-u that he stole the camera Hyun-seo used to spy on Tae-oh and threatens to expose that she bribed Hyun-seo to tail her husband, unless she gives him 30 million won in a week. Je-hyuk makes his advances for Seon-u very obvious. Meeting coincidentally, Seon-u takes advantage of dining together with Da-kyung's family, raising questions about her boyfriend. Hyun-seo then gives Seon-u a recording of her talk with Da-kyung during her visit, who tells her that Tae-oh is not attracted to Seon-u anymore, and belittles her. Sickened, Seon-u goes to a hotel and has sex with Je-hyuk. She asks him to give her an analysis of Tae-oh's company accounts as he has access to them—being Tae-oh's company's accountant—in addition to his personal bank account. Da-kyung breaks up with Tae-oh and tells him that she had an abortion. A patient of Seon-u hands her a card with footage of Tae-oh telling Da-kyung, "I'll go to Mr. Yeo right now and tell him about us", which also includes them kissing; which Seon-u realises was taken by her son during the party. This makes her decide affirmatively on a divorce.
5	"Episode 5"	Mo Wan-il & Kim Sung-jin	Joo Hyun; Mike Bartlett	10 April 2020
Both Tae-oh and Ye-Rim suspect that each other's partners haven't been faithful. Seon-u learns that Family Love has a new psychiatrist, Kim Yoon-gi. She also learns that Tae-oh's company, TO Entertainment, is nearing bankruptcy due to his mismanagement and Byung-gyu's investment is the last chance to keep it afloat. Je-hyuk blackmails Seon-u and asks her to sleep with him unless she wants her husband knowing about them. Rethinking her decision on the divorce, she contemplates suicide the same way her mother died after finding out her husband cheated on her: a car crash. The next day, she brings Tae-oh to Byung-gyu's estate for an unplanned dinner, where she reveals Tae-oh's affair and Da-kyung's pregnancy, which leads to Byung-gyu withdrawing his investment in TO Entertainment. Seon-u reveals plans to take Jun-yeong with her after the divorce. Tae-oh says to Seon-u, "It's not a crime to fall in love!" but feels betrayed when she tells him about her relationship with Je-hyuk. Seon-u sets Je-hyuk up and he is caught by Ye-rim.
6	"Episode 6"	Mo Wan-il & Kim Sung-jin	Joo Hyun; Mike Bartlett	11 April 2020
Tae-oh denies Da-kyung's accusation of him dating her for her father's money and it is revealed that she kept the fetus. Tae-oh decides to live with Da-kyung, and Seon-u sends his luggage to her house, also sending an uncontested divorce application. Unable to keep her promise, In-gyu reveals that Seon-u has been using Hyun-seo to spy on Tae-oh and Da-kyung. Tae-oh reports this to Family Love. Triggered by Tae-oh, Seon-u attempts suicide by bringing Jun-yeong to the seashore. A heated argument causes Jun-yeong to slip off the edge. At her house, Seon-u implies to Tae-oh that Jun-yeong is dead and in the climax of a violent fight, Tae-oh strangles Seon-u and slams her on the TV's sharp edges, causing her to bleed. As it turns out, Jun-yeong is alive and well and what he sees prompts him to disown his father. Ye-rim arrives at the scene and calls the paramedics. Upon Seon-u's recovery, the divorce is declared official. Tae-oh is sent a writ of garnishment and a 2-year restrain order against Jun-yeong. Da-kyung becomes a topic of discussion and gossip amongst everyone in the town. Da-kyung refuses to leave Tae-oh even after her father stops supporting her financially and declines her father's offer to take care of her and the baby if she leaves Tae-oh for good. Rumors say that Tae-oh is leaving Gosan. Two years later, Seon-u discovers that Tae-oh is moving to a premium housing estate right there, in Gosan. For their housewarming party, she receives an invite in Jun-yeong's name. Tae-oh and Da-kyung are now married and have a nearly 2 year-old daughter named Jennie.
7	"Episode 7"	Mo Wan-il & Kim Sung-jin	Joo Hyun; Mike Bartlett	17 April 2020
Two years after his divorce with Seon-u, Tae-oh and Da-kyung return to Gosan with their daughter and host a combined housewarming and wedding reception. Despite initially saying no to attending it, Jun-yeong goes anyway. This enrages Seon-u who then storms the party as an uninvited guest. Seon-u notices strange happenings outside her house and feels like she's being watched. Suspicious of her ex-husband behind this, she confronts Tae-oh, as she finds out his ulterior motives for returning to Gosan: to bring yet more trouble for Seon-u.
8	"Episode 8"	Mo Wan-il & Kim Sung-jin	Joo Hyun; Mike Bartlett	18 April 2020
After a night when her house is attacked by an unknown assailant, Seon-u becomes nervous about trivial things, but Jun-yeong seems to enjoy having his dad around, while Da-kyung tries her best to maintain a good relationship with Jun-yeong. It is revealed that Jun-yeong has kleptomania. Seon-u also just finds out that he has been taking counselling sessions from Yoon-gi for the past 6 months to cope with his emotions as he holds himself responsible for his parents' divorce, though he is not aware of the kleptomania issue. Ye-rim is suspicious of what has happened to Seon-u after Tae-oh's return to Gosan and notices a suspicious figure lurking around Seon-u's house in her absence. Tae-oh plans to put Seon-u out of work from her own hospital where she is the associate director, by offering to make a huge donation; under the condition that someone else is installed as the associate director. Seon-u is physically assaulted as Yoon-gi comes to help. Jun-yeong comes rushing home as he is worried about his mother. The identity of the assailant is revealed to be Hyun-seo's ex-boyfriend who was jailed for a year and recently hired by Tae-oh to scare Seon-u into leaving Gosan. Seon-u joins the Gosan Ladies' Society.
9	"Episode 9"	Mo Wan-il & Kim Sung-jin	Joo Hyun; Mike Bartlett	24 April 2020
Da-kyung is suspicious of Seon-u's real purpose for joining the Gosan Ladies' Association. Seon-u tells Da-kyung that her husband has been stalking Seon-u. Da-kyung finds a second phone in Tae-oh's office with photos of Seon-u, confirming what Seon-u told her. Yoon-gi and Da-kyung notice the tensions between Seon-u and Tae-oh, who both seem to have not gotten over each other. Yoon-gi tells Seon-u that he has been harbouring feelings for her but doesn't expect things to go ahead for them as he knows that Jun-yeong is the most important to Seon-u. Seon-u makes plans to secure her associate director position at Family Love Hospital by having a meeting arranged with Chairman Yeo, but things unexpectedly go in a different direction. Je-hyuk seems to have resorted to his old ways and has an affair with a bartender. Tae-oh and Je-hyuk get into a fight but Tae-oh advises Je-hyuk to prioritise his wife and this gets Je-hyuk thinking. Je-hyuk asks Ye-rim if they should have a child which causes her to burst into tears. In-gyu becomes a problem for Tae-oh as he deems his attack on Seon-u crosses the limit for attacking Seon-u physically and uses Jun-yeong to terrorize her.
10	"Episode 10"	Mo Wan-il & Kim Sung-jin	Joo Hyun; Mike Bartlett	25 April 2020
Yoon-gi catches Jun-yeong keying Chairman Yeo's car but he runs away. During a meeting with Chairman Yeo, Yoon-gi reveals that Seon-u and Tae-oh are far from over each other. Yoon-gi also says that he has only been practising transference with Seon-u and doesn't actually have any feelings for her. At the hospital, director Go confirms the removal of Seon-u as associate director and offers Yoon-gi the position. Yoon-gi admitted to Seon-u that he did it to study what the chairman was planning so he could protect her. Seon-u leaves, hurt as her trust had been broken. Ye-rim and Je-hyuk go to the hospital for fertility test as Je-hyuk is eager to build a family with Ye-rim. However, Ye-rim disappears midway after receiving a message from an unknown source about Je-hyuk's affair. Ye-rim throws Je-hyuk and his belongings outside their house and decides on a divorce. Soon, it comes to light that Tae-oh set up Jae-hyuk with the bartender. Meanwhile, In-gyu starts hounding Hyun-seo again and thrusts marriage on her. Hyun-seo's suspicious are confirmed and she informs Seon-u who then confronts In-gyu and obtains proof of the fact that Tae-oh sent In-gyu. Seon-u tries to help Hyun-seo leave Gosan to start a new life but Park In-gyu catches up to Hyun-seo at the train station.
11	"Episode 11"	Mo Wan-il & Kim Sung-jin	Joo Hyun; Mike Bartlett	1 May 2020
An incident happens at Gosan train station, where someone falls from the roof. Seon-u sees the scarf she gave Hyun-seo at the site, however Yoon-gi witnessed the accident and that the injured person is not the person she's looking for. The accident at Gosan Station causes a big uproar. Hyun-seo calls Seon-u to report about what actually happened: as she is at the stairs to the parking house, Tae-oh appears and punches her, dropping his ring in the process. He then goes up the top and seemingly pushes In-gyu, causing him to fall to his death. Da-kyung suspects his husband's involvement through his blood-stained shirt and a parking ticket at Gosan station at the time of the incident. She is hurt that Tae-oh has been lying to her. The mystery surrounding the accident continues when it is revealed that there is no record of the CCTV footage in the station of only that particular day, making Seon-u suspicious that Mr. Yeo tampers with the investigation process. Yoon-gi addresses the fact that Chairman Yeo has a tail on Seon-u over a meal with him and threatens to reveal the truth about what happened at Gosan Station that night.
12	"Episode 12"	Mo Wan-il & Kim Sung-jin	Joo Hyun; Mike Bartlett	2 May 2020
Hyun-seo Sees Seon-u meet with Chairman Yeo and thinks that Seon-u is going to frame her. At the police station, Tae-oh is helped by Seon-u during a police investigation when Hyun-seo says that Tae-oh followed In-gyu to the terrace but Seon-u appears and produces Tae-oh's ring to prove his alibi of him being with Seon-u during In-gyu's death. Tae-oh lashes out at Da-kyung after going home and Da-kyung is unable to understand why Tae-oh can't seem to let go of his attachments with Seon-u and Jun-yeong. In-gyu's death is ruled as a suicide and the case is closed. Despite Seon-u telling Tae-oh, that the made-up story at the police station is to save Jun-yeong from being labeled as the child of a murderer, he faces problems in school as his classmates gossip and spread rumours about his mother over the incident. Seon-u addresses the issue and directly confronts Hae-gang's mother. Da-kyung and Tae-oh's relationship worsens due to him caring more about Jun-yeong. Da-kyung tries to improve her relationship with Jun-yeong, and attempts to convince him to live with her and Tae-oh. Jun-yeong feels like he is in his mother's way and moves in with his dad. Living with his dad is not as rosy as he thought it would be and Jun-yeong misses his mother a little bit; but he overhears Da-kyung say what Seon-u did to get Jun-yeong's custody. Ye-rim considers giving Je-hyuk a second chance. Dejected and finally open to accepting that she should let go of Tae-oh and Jun-yeong, Seon-u packs some of Jun-yeong's clothes and asks Tae-oh to come by to pick them up. What unfolds next between Seon-u and Tae-oh is unexpectedly a complicated sexual encounter resulting from bottled up feelings and emotions.
13	"Episode 13"	Mo Wan-il & Kim Sung-jin	Joo Hyun; Mike Bartlett	8 May 2020
Jun-yeong, knowing that things can never go back to the way they were, begins to distance himself from his mom; with his kleptomania getting worse, while Da-kyung notices something strange about Jun-yeong's behaviour. Seon-u starts seriously thinking about moving and begins job hunting, but still wanting to discuss it with Jun-yeong. Jun-yeong is later caught up in a fight at school with Hae-gang when he sees Jun-yeong steal a packet of chips from the internet cafe and threatens to tell everyone at school. Hae-gang's injuries are serious but Jun-yeong doesn't seem to show any remorse or care about school at all. Things get serious as Hae-gang's parents are not ready to accept an apology and are approaching the school violence committee to have the matter attended to. Da-kyung talks to Hae-gang's parents and smooths everything out with them; something that Seon-u failed to do despite her best efforts, preventing Jun-yeong from being expelled and asserting her place as Jun-yeong's guardian. Seon-u tries to reach out to Jun-yeong but he refuses to contact or meet her and instead, tells her that everything will be okay when she leaves Gosan and that he is okay with her leaving. This breaks Seon-u's heart, but she starts preparing to leave Gosan. Seon-u goes to talk to Tae-oh one last time about Jun-yeong and his kleptomania and that's when they realise that Jun-yeong slept over at the internet cafe on the same night they had sex. When they talk to Jun-yeong about it, it is revealed that Jun-yeong has been acting out more recently because he came over to his mother's house that night and had seen them together.
14	"Episode 14"	Mo Wan-il & Kim Sung-jin	Joo Hyun; Mike Bartlett	9 May 2020
Seon-u grows more and more wary towards everything including her job, she decides that it's best for her son if she leaves Gosan and suddenly quits her job at the hospital. Da-kyung's ego is boosted even more when everybody appreciates her for taking utmost care of her stepson. Je-hyuk attempts to reconcile with Ye-rim, who then agrees to repair the relationship. Increasingly stressed, Seon-u decides to leave Gosan for Dr. Ma's hometown on the seaside and is unreachable for days. One day, Dr. Ma reports to Yoon-gi that Seon-u is missing after checking out of her hotel, Tae-oh trails Yoon-gi for the search. As it turns out, Seon-u, remembers the time her parents died; walks into the waves to commit suicide. Yoon-gi gets there just in time and pulls her out, letting her cry in his arms. Meanwhile Tae-oh tries to respect Da-kyung's own way of disciplining Jun-yeong, but the situation moves in an uncontrollable direction. Da-kyung accuses Jun-yeong of hurting Jenny while playing together in his room and Tae-oh intervenes, resulting in him slapping Jun-yeong. When Seon-u awakes, she calls her son, who she hears crying on the phone asking if she can come get him. When Seon-u arrives, Da-kyung tries to stop Jun-yeong from leaving but he runs into his mother's arms. In the ensuing argument, Seon-u tells Da-kyung to drop the act and obsessing over maintaining a perfect marriage and family, before confessing that Tae-oh slept with her.
15	"Episode 15"	Mo Wan-il & Kim Sung-jin	Joo Hyun; Mike Bartlett	15 May 2020
Da-kyung asks Tae-oh if he slept with Seon-u and he is unable to deny it. Meanwhile Jun-yeong is ready to forget Tae-oh and asks Seon-u if they can leave Gosan for good. Seon-u meets with Chairman Yeo to convince them that Da-Kyung's dreams are strained by her relationship with Tae-oh. When Da-kyung visits Seon-u's empty house, she tells herself to think carefully as it could be her last chance to leave behind all the mess she has been facing in her life. Ye-rim catches Da-kyung lurking around in Seon-u's house and tells her how many times Tae-oh came around when Seon-u wasn't home, which confirms her suspicion. Da-kyung shows up to meet Seon-u because of her insecurities and Seon-u tells her that Tae-oh saw in Da-kyung everything that once drew him to her—her wedding dress, lingerie, and perfume—while giving Da-kyung a warning that she could also suffer the same fate. Da-kyung has a hard time accepting Tae-oh's patterns and tendencies; but she soon realises the truth for herself. Tae-oh loses everything as he is entirely cut off from Dae-Kyung's family, as they move out from Gosan. Seon-u offers a little financial help till he can pick himself up, but he blames her for all his misfortunes and vows to take Jun-yeong with him one day. A month later, Seon-u works again at the hospital. He returns home to find her son missing and a note that says, "I'll take Jun-yeong with me".
16	"Episode 16"	Mo Wan-il & Kim Sung-jin	Joo Hyun; Mike Bartlett	16 May 2020
The scene flashes back to 3 weeks ago - Seon-u and Jun-yeong are living a peaceful and happy life together and Jun-yeong even decided to stay in the same school and cope. Jun-yeong slowly inches towards completely pushing Tae-oh out of his mind and life. The women in Gosan tread lightly around Seon-u so as to not offend her as they all know who was responsible in driving Chairman Yeo and his family out of Gosan. One week before Jun-yeong disappears, Tae-oh is being seen again in town, making Je-hyuk and Seon-u suspicious. She receives in the mail a torn up photo of her, Tae-oh and Jun-yeong that was retaped together. In the present day, Seon-u arrives at home to find Jun-yeong missing. When she calls Tae-oh, he admits that he brings Jun-yeong because he would go crazy if he couldn't meet him. Seon-u agrees for them to have a meal together so that Tae-oh can improve his image in his son's eyes one last time; instead, Tae-oh begs Seon-u to take him back and for them to start over as a family again. Seon-u tells him to get his act together and bid farewell to his son one last time. As they leave, Tae-oh tries to throw himself in front of a truck but was unscathed. But seeing his mother go after Tae-oh, Jun-yeong runs away. A year later, it is revealed that Tae-oh restarts a production house. Ye-rim and Je-hyuk have split; Ye-rim is happier than before and runs her own restaurant/bakery, and Je-hyuk has someone new in his life. Da-kyung is serious about her art gallery but still cannot bring herself to trust another man. After a vain search for Jun-yeong, he suddenly appears at home to reunite with his mother.

== Production ==
=== Development and filming ===
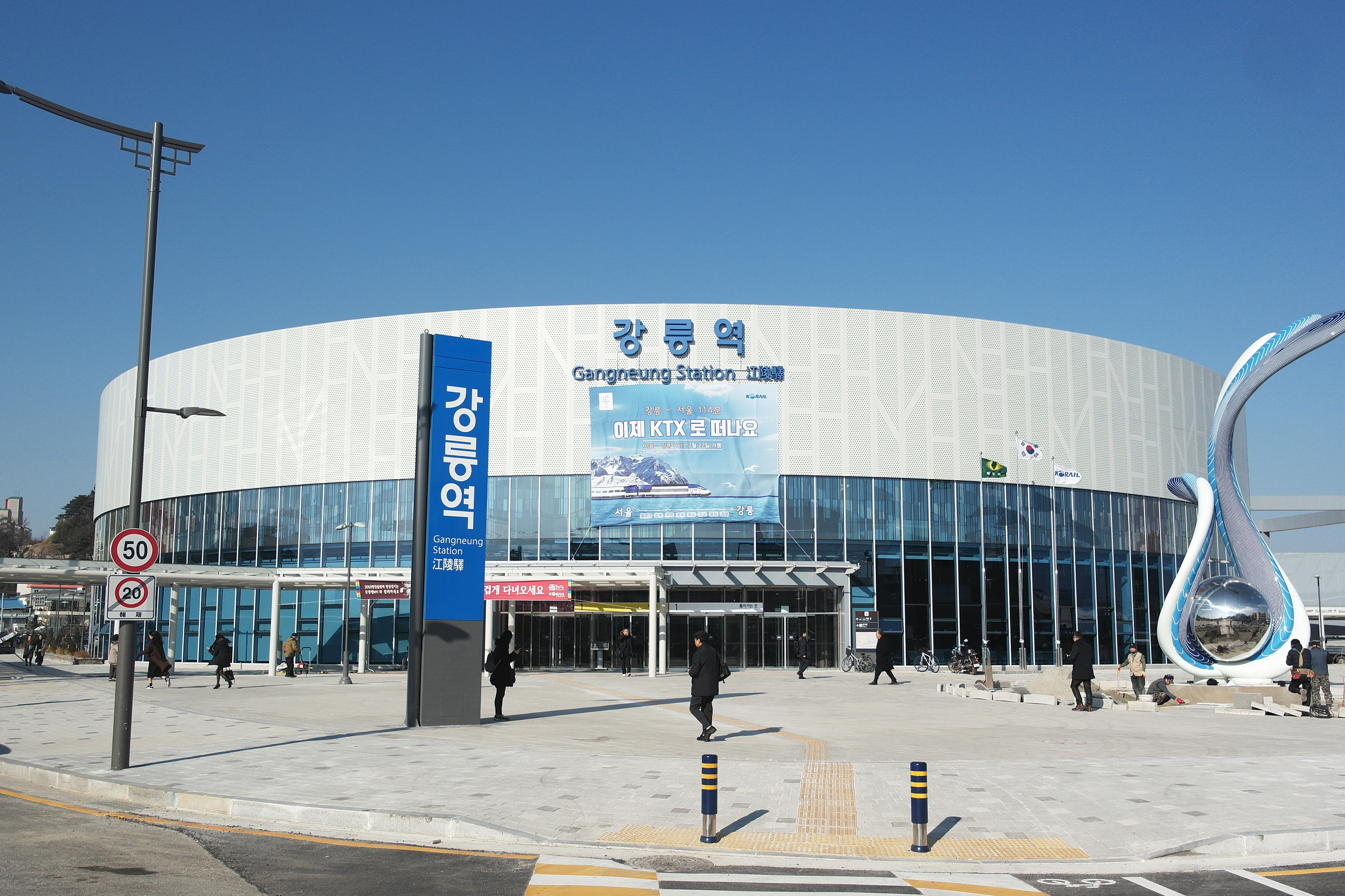
Scenes at Gosan Station were filmed at Gangneung Station in Gangneung, Gangwon Province

In 2018, JTBC Studios acquired the rights to remake the scripted format of Drama Republic's series Doctor Foster from BBC Studios. Kang Eun-kyung, who wrote popular TV series such as King of Baking, Kim Takgu (2010) and Dr. Romantic (2016–2020), served as the creator. Gaemi (Kang Dong-yoon), who previously worked on the soundtracks of popular series such as Descendants of the Sun (2016) and When the Camellia Blooms (2019), took charge of the music production.

The series was directed by Mo Wan-il of the 2018 romance-thriller series Misty. In response to questions about the difference between the series and the British original, Mo said, "While the original is focused more on the main character, in adapting the story for the Korean series, we wanted to portray a whirlwind of emotions to rage around the main character and the people around her". Mo then emphasized that unlike the original series, The World of the Married does not just focus on one person but also focuses on the relationships in which the main female character, Ji Seon-u, is involved.

The first script-reading was held on September 30, 2019. The primary filming location was in Chuncheon, Gangwon Province, which is the fictional city of Gosan in the series. The Gosan Station featured in the series was shot at Gangneung Station. Much of the filming also took place at an American village called Humphreys Landing, which is Gosan Premium Townhouse Complex in the series, in Pyeongtaek, Gyeonggi Province. The crew wrapped up the last shoot on May 12, 2020.

=== Casting ===
Kim Hee-ae and Park Hae-joon were confirmed to star in the drama series on September 30, 2019. Park Hae-joon initially said no to the series saying that, "I wanted to do it, but I was worried about whether I could do it well". Speaking to GQ Korea, he revealed that he was hesitant due to the strong extreme traits of the male lead character who cheats on his wife. He also stated that he did not feel confident to give justice to the role of a cheating husband with the needed intensity as he did not have much time to prepare. However, he eventually accepted the offer after talking to a friend.

Subsequently, Han So-hee and Lee Moo-saeng were confirmed to join the cast on October 7 and on December 4, 2019, respectively.

=== Content rating ===
The first to the sixth episodes were fixed at late-night hours so that only those aged 19 or older can watch them under the Juvenile Protection Act. The series's scenes were deemed unfit to be shown to those who are under 19. For the seventh and eighth episodes, they were lowered to allow those aged 15 or older to watch them. However, after facing criticisms from a portion of viewers for including some aggressive scenes in Episode 7 and Episode 8, the rating was altered back to 19 or older starting from the ninth episode.

=== Broadcast and home video ===
The World of the Married was originally broadcast on JTBC on Fridays and Saturdays from March 27 to May 16, 2020. It is available for streaming online via Viu in Hong Kong, Singapore, Malaysia, Thailand, Indonesia, and Myanmar. The series became the most-watched drama on the streaming platform, being watched by more than 55% of Viu's audience in Asia since the beginning of its screening. It is also available to stream on Iflix in Southeast Asia with subtitles in Indonesian, English, Malay and Vietnamese. The drama is also available on Netflix and Disney+ in selected territories.

=== Original soundtrack ===
The World of the Married

Soundtrack album by Various Artists
- Released: May 25, 2020
- Genre: Soundtrack
- Languages: Korean; English
- Labels: JTBC Studios; Most Contents; Kakao M
- Producer: Gaemi

Singles from The World of the Married
- 1. "Lonely Sailing" Released: March 28, 2020; 2. "Nothing On You" Released: April 4, 2020; 3. "Sad" Released: April 11, 2020; 4. "Just Leave Me" Released: April 17, 2020; 5. "Farewell In Tears" Released: April 25, 2020; 6. "The Days We Loved" Released: May 1, 2020

The series's soundtrack is compiled in a two-part album released on May 25, 2020. The album contains 6 original soundtracks and 28 musical scores. The following lists are the track listings for the online streaming of the album.

CD 1
No.	Title	Lyrics	Music	Artist	Length
1.	"Lonely Sailing" (고독한 항해)	Gaemi	Gaemi	Kim Yoon-ah (Jaurim)	4:41
2.	"Nothing On You"	Josh Daniel	Gaemi	Josh Daniel	3:07
3.	"Sad"	Hana	Jeong Sung-min (POPKID); Shin Ji-hoo (Postmen)	Son Seung-yeon	3:36
4.	"Just Leave Me" (그냥 나를 버려요)	Ra.L; Naomi	Gaemi; Ra.L	Ha Dong-kyun	4:20
5.	"Farewell In Tears" (눈물로 너를 떠나보낸다)	Gaemi; Ra.L; Naomi	Gaemi	Huh Gak	4:16
6.	"The Days We Loved" (사랑했던 날들)	Gaemi; Midnight	Gaemi; Midnight	Baek Ji-young	4:01
7.	"Endless Story"		Gaemi; Lee Gun-young		2:53
8.	"Finale"		Park Mi-sun		2:34
9.	"The World Where Everything Is Perfect"		Park Jung-hwan		2:45
10.	"Be Realized"		Lee Sung-gu		2:45
11.	"Infatuation"		Lee Gun-young		2:11
12.	"Seon-u's Provocation"		Jo Yoon-jung		2:30
13.	"Splendid"		Gaemi; Lee Gun-young		3:28
14.	"Vengeance"		Park Mi-sun		2:39
15.	"Distrust"		Park Yoon-seo		2:59
16.	"Passion"		Lee Gun-young		3:15
17.	"The Beginning of Doubt"		Jo Yoon-jung		2:48
18.	"I Hope Not"		Lee Sung-gu		2:15
Total length:					57:03

CD 2
No.	Title	Music	Length
1.	"Tears of Solitude"	Gaemi	5:21
2.	"Doubt"	Lee Gun-young	2:33
3.	"Collapsing"	Park Mi-sun	3:13
4.	"Seemingly"	Park Yoon-seo	3:12
5.	"Rumor"	Park Mi-sun	2:46
6.	"The Silent Whisper"	Park Jung-hwan	2:32
7.	"A Dark Room"	Lee Sung-gu	2:52
8.	"What a Delightful Thought"	Park Jung-hwan	3:10
9.	"Grief"	Lee Gun-young	3:16
10.	"Perfect Day"	James Kang	2:06
11.	"Reasonable Suspicion"	Park Yoon-seo	2:49
12.	"One Fine Day"	Gaemi	3:48
13.	"Perplexing"	Lee Sung-gu	3:33
14.	"Chaotic"	Gaemi	4:43
15.	"Unjustified"	Park Yoon-seo	2:26
16.	"The Woman Amongst True Friends"	Jo Yoon-jung; Park Jung-hwan	2:51
Total length:			51:11

== Reception ==
=== Commercial performance ===
The series emerged as the most-talked-about series in South Korea in the first half of 2020. According to big data analytics firm Good Data Corporation, the series ranked first place in the series category with an overwhelming score, achieving an "all-kill" record for its huge online presence in terms of news articles and comments, video views, and blog and community posts and comments. Additionally, various parodies were made about the series by other entertainment programs, Korean celebrities and the online community. As a result, the keyword 'adultery', which was considered to be a serious and rarely-discussed topic on Korean broadcasting channels, went beyond the series and became a widely discussed topic on social media.

Kim's fashion and styling in the series also received attention from the public by consistently rising to be the top real-time search term after an episode was aired. The fashion, dubbed as "Kim Hee-ae Fashion" and "Ji Seon-u Style", boosted a style that mixes inner outfit, outer outfit and shoes of similar colors. In addition, premium golf brand St Andrews experienced an unexpected huge burst in sales by about 4,000% YOY in the first two weeks of May after Han So-hee wore its golf apparel in the series. The clothes and hats that Han wore were all sold out in stores across the country for two days after the episode was aired. Emons Furniture also saw its sales volume almost double after its products appeared in the series.

=== Critical response ===
The series was praised by critics for steering away from the typical revenge storyline and instead focuses on the complex psychology of the characters. Series critic Gong Hee-jung said that it is different from other dramas about conflicts between couples in that it "closely depicted the psychology of the characters in each situation". Edmund Lee of South China Morning Post gave the drama series 4.5 out of 5 stars and called it "one of the best Korean dramas in years" due to its "masterfully scripted story of infidelity and revenge" and "vividly caustic dialogue, melancholic plot twists and some wonderfully convincing performances". Jung Deok-hyun, a pop culture critic, called the series "a great significance", as there have been no Korean television shows restricted to viewers over 19 that achieved the same success as The World of the Married and said that the series opened the door for other shows to contain more mature content. According to The Guardian, the drama was praised for its realism with its portrayal of life after divorce and how it broke the way how men are usually portrayed in Korean dramas, as well as featuring plot lines implying issues that were not featured in the original series such as dating violence and the widening social inequality and gender inequality in the Korean society. Storylines about gender discrimination in the workplace were shared broadly on the internet and further prompted many women to share about their negative experiences with male colleagues.

The production team also received positive reviews for their willingness to push the boundaries not only with the story but with their unique filming approach. According to EDaily, the series's success was led by director Mo Wan-il, whose detailed and sensuous directing that focused on the emotions and psychology of the characters differentiated the series from other shows about adultery. Additionally, the success of the series was attributed to the solid performances from the cast, particularly Kim Hee-ae who received rave reviews for her intense and explosive portrayal of Ji Seon-u throughout the series.

Meanwhile, culture critic Hwang Jin-mi criticized the series questioning if the portrayal of the main character's fear of being a divorcee fits with society today.

=== Controversies ===
The drama series sparked viewer criticisms for a violent scene featured in Episode 8, which was edited from the perpetrator's view similar to what it is in virtual reality. The unprecedented "detailed first-person perspective" of the scene was said to be too aggressive for television and could possibly be a trauma trigger for some viewers. On the other hand, there were viewers who found the "first-person perspective" camerawork to be refreshing and experimental in the Korean drama scene as it added to the overall tension of the moment.

There was also a controversial scene that was deemed to be a "commercialization of sex" in the drama when a female character asked for a luxury bag in return for sexual favours. It was criticized for the manner in which it depicts the theme. After the controversies, the Korea Communications Standards Commission suggested that new measures had to be taken to curb inappropriate content on South Korean television, as such plot points promote violence and deliver negative messages about women. Committee member Park Sang-soo claimed that "the scene of the assault is cruel" and that "the scene of the female character demanding the luxury bag shows a disgusting view of women". However, there were differing opinions saying that television should be more bold with more mature content as such situations are realistic. In a meeting held on May 27, 2020, the broadcasting review subcommittee of the Korea Communications Standards Commission decided on the administrative guidance "recommendation" for the drama due to its controversial scenes and the re-broadcasting of the same content during the youth viewing protection hours. As a result, the series received a warning from the broadcasting committee, although no penalty was given to JTBC.

== Viewership ==
Although the series aired on JTBC, a cable channel/pay TV which normally has a relatively smaller audience compared to free-to-air TV/public broadcasters (KBS, SBS, MBC and EBS), after only 12 episodes, the drama series became the most-watched series ever in Korean cable television history according to Nielsen Korea, surpassing the previous record of 23.8 percent set by another JTBC's series Sky Castle. This marked the highest viewership by a series episode aired on a local cable channel and the second-highest for all programs aired on cable networks.

The World of the Married : South Korea viewers per episode (millions)

Season	Episode number																Average
Season	1	2	3	4	5	6	7	8	9	10	11	12	13	14	15	16	Average
1	1.168	2.141	2.590	3.182	3.074	4.045	3.783	4.362	4.396	5.121	4.804	5.302	4.678	5.385	5.208	6.248	4.093

Source: Audience measurement performed nationwide by Nielsen Korea.

Average TV viewership ratings
Ep.	Original broadcast date	Average audience share (Nielsen Korea)	
Ep.	Original broadcast date	Nationwide	Seoul
1	March 27, 2020	6.260% (1st)	6.786% (1st)
2	March 28, 2020	9.979% (1st)	11.023% (1st)
3	April 3, 2020	11.882% (1st)	14.016% (1st)
4	April 4, 2020	13.986% (1st)	15.794% (1st)
5	April 10, 2020	14.676% (1st)	16.118% (1st)
6	April 11, 2020	18.816% (1st)	21.390% (1st)
7	April 17, 2020	18.501% (1st)	21.406% (1st)
8	April 18, 2020	20.061% (1st)	22.276% (1st)
9	April 24, 2020	20.539% (1st)	23.175% (1st)
10	April 25, 2020	22.913% (1st)	25.878% (1st)
11	May 1, 2020	21.122% (1st)	23.986% (1st)
12	May 2, 2020	24.332% (1st)	26.747% (1st)
13	May 8, 2020	21.087% (1st)	23.920% (1st)
14	May 9, 2020	24.307% (1st)	26.841% (1st)
15	May 15, 2020	24.442% (1st)	27.975% (1st)
16	May 16, 2020	28.371% (1st)	31.669% (1st)
Average		18.830%	21.188%
Special	May 22, 2020	3.904%	4.777%
Special	May 23, 2020	4.288%	4.534%
In the table above, the blue numbers represent the lowest ratings and the red numbers represent the highest ratings.; The special episodes included behind-the-scenes videos and interviews with the actors.

== Accolades ==
Year	Award	Category	Recipient	Result	Ref.
2020	56th Baeksang Arts Awards	Grand Prize – Television	Kim Hee-ae	Nominated	
2020	56th Baeksang Arts Awards	Best Director	Mo Wan-il	Won	
2020	56th Baeksang Arts Awards	Best Actress	Kim Hee-ae	Won	
2020	56th Baeksang Arts Awards	Best Supporting Actor	Kim Young-min	Nominated	
2020	56th Baeksang Arts Awards	Best New Actress	Han So-hee	Nominated	
2020	2nd Asia Contents Awards & Global OTT Awards	Best Asian Drama	The World of the Married	Nominated	
2020	2nd Asia Contents Awards & Global OTT Awards	Best Creative	Mo Wan-il	Won	
2020	2nd Asia Contents Awards & Global OTT Awards	Best Actress	Kim Hee-ae	Won	
2020	2nd Asia Contents Awards & Global OTT Awards	Best Writer	Joo Hyun	Nominated	
2020	7th APAN Star Awards	Grand Prize	Kim Hee-ae	Nominated	
2020	7th APAN Star Awards	Best Actor in a Mini Series	Park Hae-joon	Won	
2020	7th APAN Star Awards	Best Supporting Actor	Kim Young-min	Won	
2020	7th APAN Star Awards	Best New Actor	Lee Hak-joo	Nominated	
2020	7th APAN Star Awards	Best New Actress	Han So-hee	Nominated	
2020	5th Asia Artist Awards	Rookie of the Year – Television/Film	Han So-hee	Won	
2021	25th Asian Television Awards	Best Drama Series	The World of the Married	Nominated	
