= Would You Stay for Tea? =

Would You Stay For Tea?

EP by Hello Venus
- Released: May 2, 2013
- Genre: K-pop; dance
- Length: 13:57
- Label: Tricell Media; NHN Entertainment
- Producer: Oreo; Seo Yongbae; Kim Heesun; Park Seoksu; Inwoo; WATT

Hello Venus chronology
What Are You Doing Today? (2012)	Would You Stay For Tea? (2013)	I'm Ill (2015)

Singles from Would You Stay For Tea?
- 1. "Would You Stay For Tea?" Released: May 2, 2013

Music video
- "Would You Stay For Tea?" on YouTube

Would You Stay For Tea? (Korean: 차 마실래?; RR: cha masillae?), also known as Walk Me Home, is the third extended play by South Korean girl group Hello Venus. It was released on May 2, 2013, by Tricell Media and distributed by NHN Entertainment. This was the last release with members Yoo Ara and Yoonjo, after their departure on mid-2014.

The EP was a commercial success peaking at number 6 on the Gaon Album Chart. It has sold over 8,400 physical copies as of May 2013.

== Release ==
The EP was digitally released on May 2, 2013, through several music portals, including MelOn in South Korea, and iTunes for the global market.

== Promotion ==
=== Live performances ===
The group held their first comeback stage on Mnet's M Countdown on May 2, 2013, performing the title track. They continued on MBC's Show! Music Core on May 4, SBS's Inkigayo on May 5 and MBC Music's Show Champion on May 8.

=== Singles ===
"Would You Stay For Tea?" was released as the title track in conjunction with the EP on May 2, 2013. A music video teaser for the song was released on April 25. The official music video was released on May 2, through the group's official YouTube channel. The video follows each member in a date with a guy. The song debuted at number 37 on the Gaon Digital Chart, on the chart issue dated April 28 - May 4, 2013, with 75,881 downloads sold. A week later, the song peaked at number 33, with 63,128 downloads sold. The song also entered at number 42 on the chart for the month of May 2013, with 222,689 downloads sold. It also charted at number 97 for the month of June.

== Commercial performance ==
Would You Stay For Tea? debuted and peaked at number 6 on the Gaon Album Chart, on the chart issue dated April 28 - May 4, 2013. In its second week, the EP fell to number 43 and to number 83 in its third week. In its fifth week, the EP saw a rise to number 18. The EP placed at number 56 before dropping the chart after eight consecutive weeks.

The EP entered at number 11 on the chart for the month of May 2013, with 8,447 physical copies sold.

== Track listing ==
Digital download
No.	Title	Lyrics	Music	Arrangement	Length
1.	"Would You Stay For Tea?" (Korean: 차 마실래?; RR: cha masillae?)	Oreo; Seo Yongbae	Oreo; Seo Yongbae	Oreo; Seo Yongbae	3:27
2.	"Kiss Me"	Kim Heesun	Kim Heesun	Kim Heesun	3:16
3.	"Wait A Minute" (Korean: 잠깐만; RR: jamkkanman)	Park Seoksu; Inwoo	Park Seoksu	Park Seoksu; Inwoo	3:32
4.	"Keeps On" (Korean: 자꾸만; RR: jakkuman)	WATT	WATT	WATT	3:42
Total length:					13:57

== Charts ==
Chart (2013)	Peak position
South Korea (Gaon Weekly Album Chart)	6
South Korea (Gaon Monthly Album Chart)	11

== Release history ==
Region	Date	Format	Label
South Korea	May 2, 2013	Digital download	Tricell Media, NHN Entertainment
Worldwide	May 2, 2013	Digital download	Tricell Media, NHN Entertainment
