= Fates & Furies (TV series) =

2018 South Korean television series

- Promotional poster
- Hangul: 운명과 분노
- Hanja: 運命과 憤怒
- Lit.: Fate and Fury
- RR: Unmyeonggwa bunno
- MR: Unmyŏnggwa punno
- Genre: Romance; Melodrama
- Created by: Hong Chang-wook
- Written by: Kang Cheol-woong (Eps. 1–4); Lee Je-in (Eps. 5–40); Jeon Chan-ho (Eps. 5–40)
- Directed by: Jung Dong-yoon; Cho Young-min
- Starring: Lee Min-jung; Joo Sang-wook; So Yi-hyun; Lee Ki-woo
- Composer: Park Se-joon (Music Manager)
- Country of origin: South Korea
- Original language: Korean
- No. of episodes: 40

Production
- Executive producers: Teddy Jung; Shin Byung-chul
- Running time: 30 minutes
- Production companies: Hobak Dungkul (Pumpkin Vine); iHQ

Original release
- Network: SBS TV
- Release: December 1, 2018 – February 9, 2019

Related
- Fates and Furies (Philippine adaptation) GMA Network 2023

Fates & Furies (Korean: 운명과 분노; RR: Unmyeonggwa bunno) is a South Korean television series starring Lee Min-jung, Joo Sang-wook, So Yi-hyun and Lee Ki-woo. It aired four consecutive episodes every Saturday on SBS TV from December 1, 2018 to February 9, 2019.

Fates & Furies is the final weekend special project drama series (주말 특별기획 드라마) of SBS.

== Synopsis ==
Even though Goo Hae-ra (Lee Min-jung) is smart and beautiful, she is in a miserable situation because of her family. Her older sister attempted suicide and her father died. The only way she can escape her situation is with money. She approaches Tae In-joon (Joo Sang-wook). He is the second son of a shoe company owner. Tae In-joon falls in love with Goo Hae-ra.

== Cast ==
=== Main ===
- Lee Min-jung as Goo Hae-ra

A woman who begins to love under false pretenses in order to change her fate.

- Joo Sang-wook as Tae In-joon
  - Choi Seung-hoon as young In-joon

The second son of a Chaebol family who pursues Goo Hae-ra because he considers her his fate. He also intends to become the owner of his family's company by getting his stepmother and older half-brother out of the way.

- So Yi-hyun as Cha Soo-hyun

An ambitious and greedy woman who dislikes Goo Hae-ra because she is in the way of her marriage to Tae In-joon.

- Lee Ki-woo as Jin Tae-oh

A man who was betrayed by Cha Soo-hyun and now seeks revenge.

=== Recurring ===
- Cha Soo-yeon as Goo Hyun-joo

Goo Hae-ra's sister who is in a coma

- Jung Kyoo-soo as Goo Dong-seok

Goo Hae-ra's father, a shoemaker

- Jung Soo-young as Kang Sun-young

Goo Hae-ra's friend

- Jung Yoon-hak as Kang Ui-gun

Kang Sun-young's younger brother

- Shim Yi-young as Ko A-jung

Tae Jung-ho's wife, who is ignored by her mother-in-law

- Kong Jung-hwan as Tae Jung-ho

Tae In-joon's older half-brother

- Song Ok-sook as Han Sung-sook

Tae In-joon's stepmother

- Ko In-beom as Tae Pil-woon

Tae In-joon's father and the head of the company

- Heo Joon-seok as Kim Chang-soo

A loan shark who harasses Goo Hae-ra

- Jo Seung-yeon as Hyun Jung-soo
- Kwon Tae-won as Cha Dong-kyoo
- Im Ji-kyu as Assistant Kim
- Jo Wan-ki as Kim Seok-jin
- Park Soo-ah as Tae Jung-min

== Production ==
- The first script reading took place on September 11, 2018 at SBS Studio in Tanhyun, Ilsan, South Korea.
- Lee Min-jung and Joo Sang-wook previously starred together in Cunning Single Lady (2014).

== Original soundtrack ==
Fates & Furies OST

Soundtrack album by Various artists
- Recorded: 2018
- Genre: Soundtrack
- Languages: Korean; English
- Labels: Yedang C&S; Well-Made

=== Part 1 ===
Released on December 8, 2018
No.	Title	Artist	Length
1.	"Fates and Furies" (Eng ver.)	Aalia	3:43
2.	"Fates and Furies" (Inst.)		3:43
3.	"Fates and Furies" (Kor ver.)	Lisa	3:39
4.	"Fates and Furies" (Inst.)		3:39
Total length:			8:01

=== Part 2 ===
Released on December 22, 2018
No.	Title	Artist	Length
1.	"The Moon represents my heart" (달이내마음을나탄배니다)	Lee Min-jung	3:13

=== Part 3 ===
Released on December 29, 2018
No.	Title	Artist	Length
1.	"Don't Worry" (고민하지말아요)	Aalia	3:13
2.	"Don't Worry" (Inst.)		3:13
Total length:			6:26

=== Part 4 ===
Released on January 5, 2019
No.	Title	Artist	Length
1.	"Obsession" (집작)	Yoon Hak	3:35
2.	"Obsession" (Inst.)		3:35
Total length:			7:10

=== Part 5 ===
Released on January 12, 2019
No.	Title	Artist	Length
1.	"Last over Letter" (마지막편지)	Jung Se-hoon	2:51
2.	"Last over Letter" (Inst.)		2:51
Total length:			5:42

Disc 2:
No.	Title	Artist	Length
1.	"Paint it Gray"	Various Artists	2:47
2.	"Last Express"	Various Artists	3:00
3.	"Monologue"	Various Artists	2:57
4.	"Last love letter"	Various Artists	2:34
5.	"Fate Waltz"	Various Artists	2:13
6.	"Psychological Fight"	Various Artists	1:59
7.	"TRICK"	Various Artists	1:32
8.	"Secret Forest"	Various Artists	2:35
9.	"Not you"	Various Artists	2:20
10.	"We are one"	Various Artists	1:58
11.	"Old Box"	Various Artists	2:51
12.	"In the dark"	Various Artists	2:01
13.	"Seed"	Various Artists	1:49
14.	"Silence"	Various Artists	2:17
15.	"Fate"	Various Artists	2:40
16.	"Single Tear"	Various Artists	2:01

== Ratings ==
- In the table below, the blue numbers represent the lowest ratings and the red numbers represent the highest ratings.
- NR denotes that the drama did not rank in the top 20 daily programs on that date.
- N/A denotes that the rating is not known.

Ep.	Original broadcast date	Average audience share	
Ep.	Original broadcast date	AGB Nielsen	
Ep.	Original broadcast date	Nationwide	Seoul
1	December 1, 2018	4.8% (NR)	5.3% (NR)
2	December 1, 2018	6.1% (NR)	6.2% (NR)
3	December 1, 2018	7.2% (17th)	7.2% (15th)
4	December 1, 2018	6.9% (20th)	7.1% (17th)
5	December 8, 2018	6.9% (NR)	7.9% (19th)
6	December 8, 2018	9.0% (10th)	10.0% (5th)
7	December 8, 2018	8.6% (15th)	9.3% (8th)
8	December 8, 2018	9.3% (9th)	10.3% (4th)
9	December 22, 2018	5.2% (NR)	5.8% (NR)
10	December 22, 2018	5.7% (NR)	6.0% (NR)
11	December 22, 2018	5.8% (NR)	5.9% (NR)
12	December 22, 2018	6.8% (20th)	7.1% (20th)
13	December 29, 2018	5.6% (NR)	6.2% (NR)
14	December 29, 2018	6.9% (18th)	7.6% (16th)
15	December 29, 2018	7.4% (15th)	8.2% (15th)
16	December 29, 2018	8.6% (11th)	9.5% (7th)
17	January 5, 2019	5.3% (NR)	
18	January 5, 2019	6.2% (NR)	6.5% (20th)
19	January 5, 2019	7.2% (18th)	7.6% (17th)
20	January 5, 2019	7.8% (15th)	8.1% (14th)
21	January 12, 2019	3.7% (NR)	—N/a
22	January 12, 2019	4.9% (NR)	—N/a
23	January 12, 2019	5.7% (NR)	—N/a
24	January 12, 2019	6.0% (NR)	—N/a
25	January 19, 2019	4.6% (NR)	—N/a
26	January 19, 2019	4.7% (NR)	—N/a
27	January 19, 2019	5.0% (NR)	—N/a
28	January 19, 2019	6.3% (18th)	6.5% (18th)
29	January 26, 2019	4.9% (NR)	—N/a
30	January 26, 2019	5.4% (NR)	6.2% (18th)
31	January 26, 2019	6.1% (19th)	6.5% (17th)
32	January 26, 2019	7.0% (16th)	7.5% (12th)
23	February 2, 2019	4.7% (NR)	—N/a
34	February 2, 2019	6.1% (NR)	—N/a
35	February 2, 2019	6.5% (19th)	6.6% (20th)
36	February 2, 2019	7.3% (17th)	7.5% (17th)
37	February 9, 2019	5.3% (NR)	—N/a
38	February 9, 2019	6.8% (19th)	7.4% (17th)
39	February 9, 2019	6.9% (18th)	7.4% (17th)
40	February 9, 2019	7.7% (16th)	8.2% (15th)
Average		6.32%	–

- Episodes 9-12 did not air on December 15 due to the broadcast of the 2018 AFF Championship Final between Vietnam and Malaysia, which Park Hang-seo, the coach of Vietnam, is a Korean.
