= Lee Min-jung =

South Korean actress (born 1982)

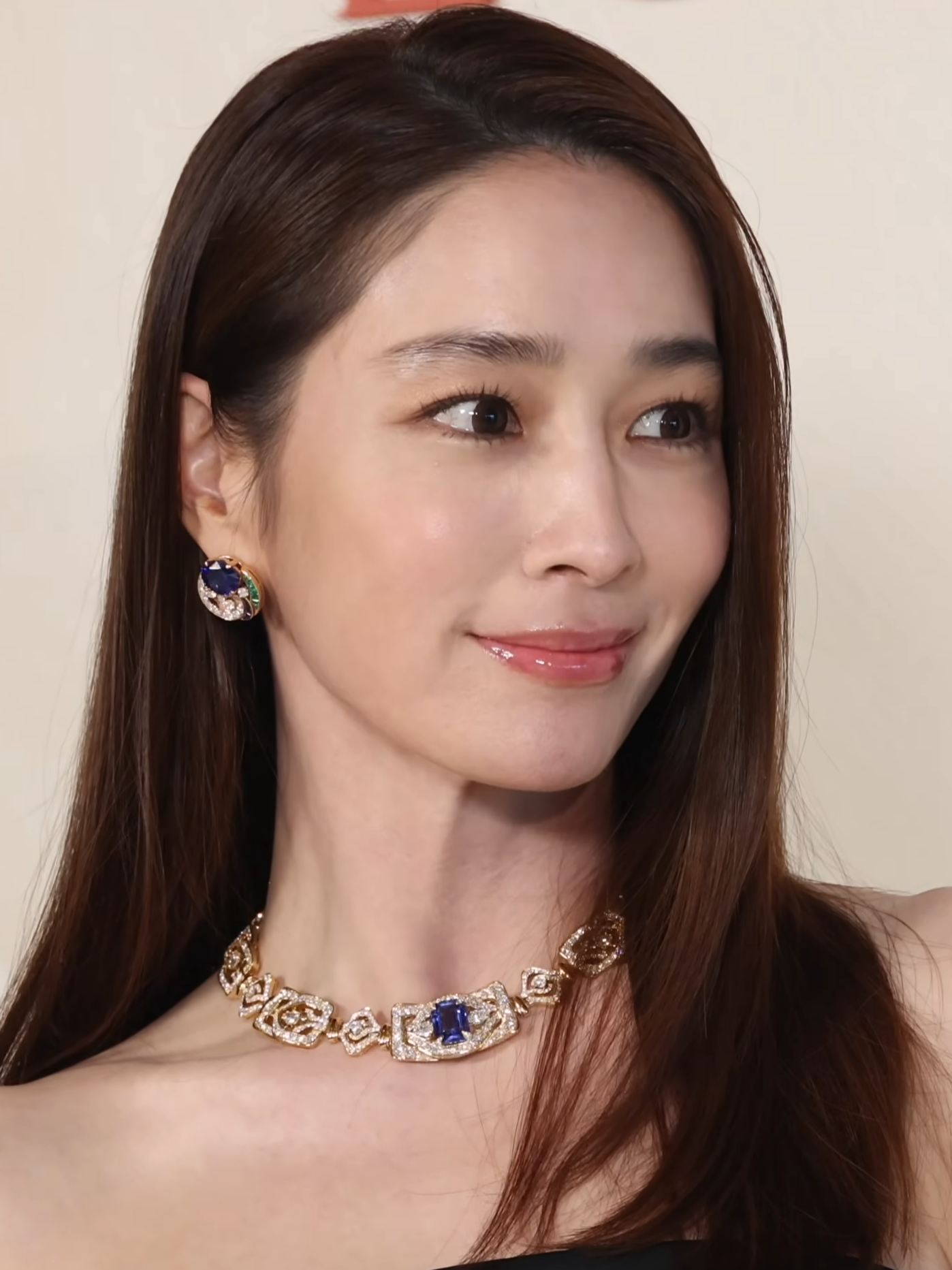
- Lee in May 2026
- Born: February 16, 1982 (age 44); Seoul, South Korea
- Education: Sungkyunkwan University (Theater)
- Occupation: Actress
- Years active: 2004–present
- Agent: MS Team Entertainment (2008–present)
- Spouse: Lee Byung-hun (m. 2013)
- Children: 2

Korean name
- Hangul: 이민정
- Hanja: 李珉廷
- RR: I Minjeong
- MR: I Minjŏng

Lee Min-jung (Korean: 이민정; born February 16, 1982) is a South Korean actress. She began her career in Jang Jin's stage play, and for a few years appeared in supporting roles on film and television. She became known after her appearance in Boys Over Flowers (2009), and landed her first lead role in family drama Smile, You (2009).

Lee achieved widespread recognition for her leading role in the romantic comedy Cyrano Agency (2010). She also starred in Wonderful Radio (2012), Big (2012), Cunning Single Lady (2014), and Come Back Mister (2016). In 2020, she starred and gained recognition in the KBS weekend drama, Once Again.

== Career ==
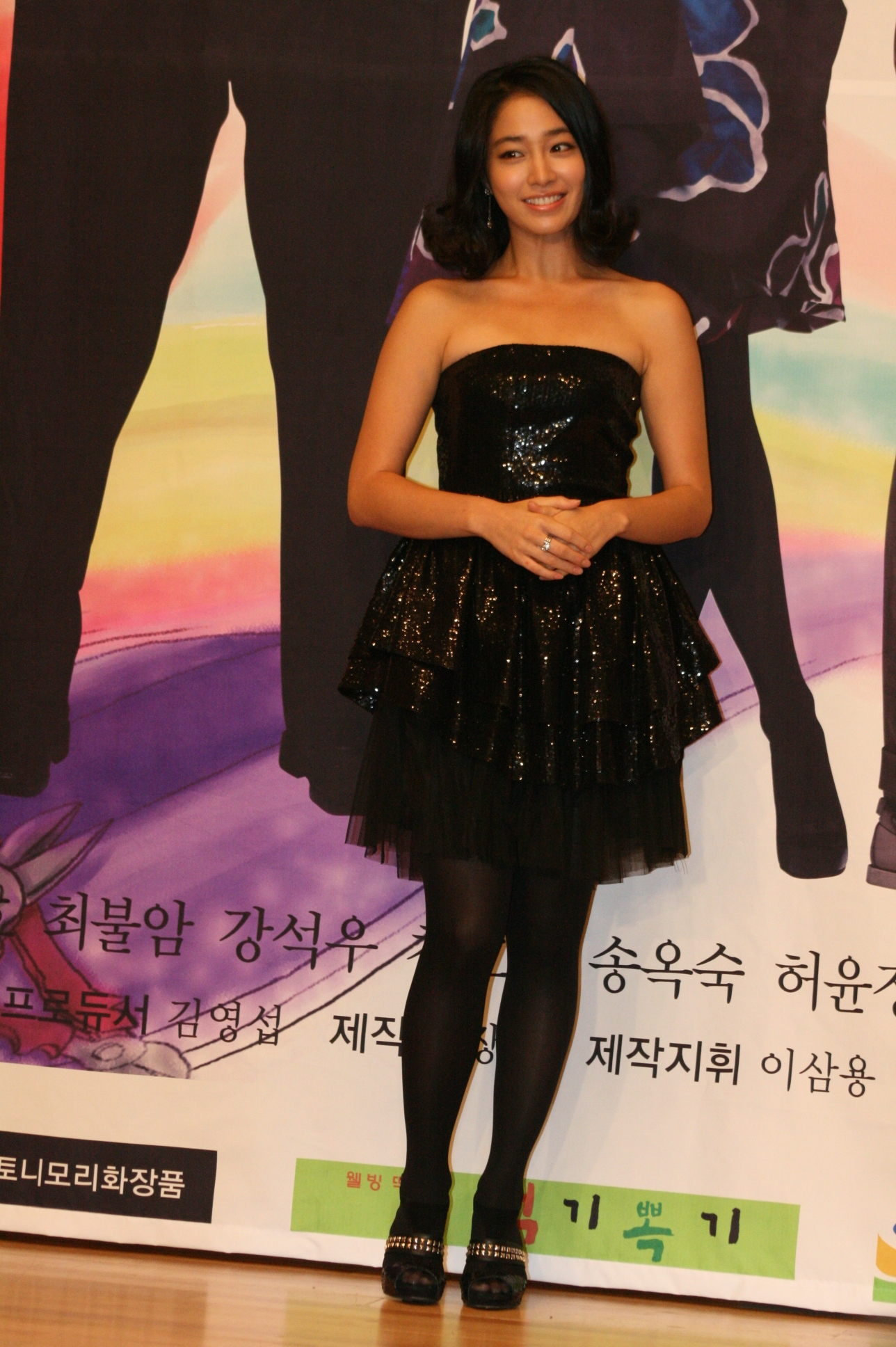
Lee at the Smile, You press conference in 2009

Lee began her career in playwright/filmmaker Jang Jin's stage plays, then appeared in the Christian-themed indie Pruning the Grapevine, while doing minor roles on film and television. She became a household name in 2009 through her supporting role in the popular high school series Boys Over Flowers, which then landed her first leading role in the weekend drama Smile, You. The same year, she won the Best New Actress award at the Korean Association of Film Critics Awards for her performance in the mystery thriller White Night.

Lee's breakout role was in romantic comedy Cyrano Agency in 2010, where she swept Best New Actress awards at various local award-giving bodies.

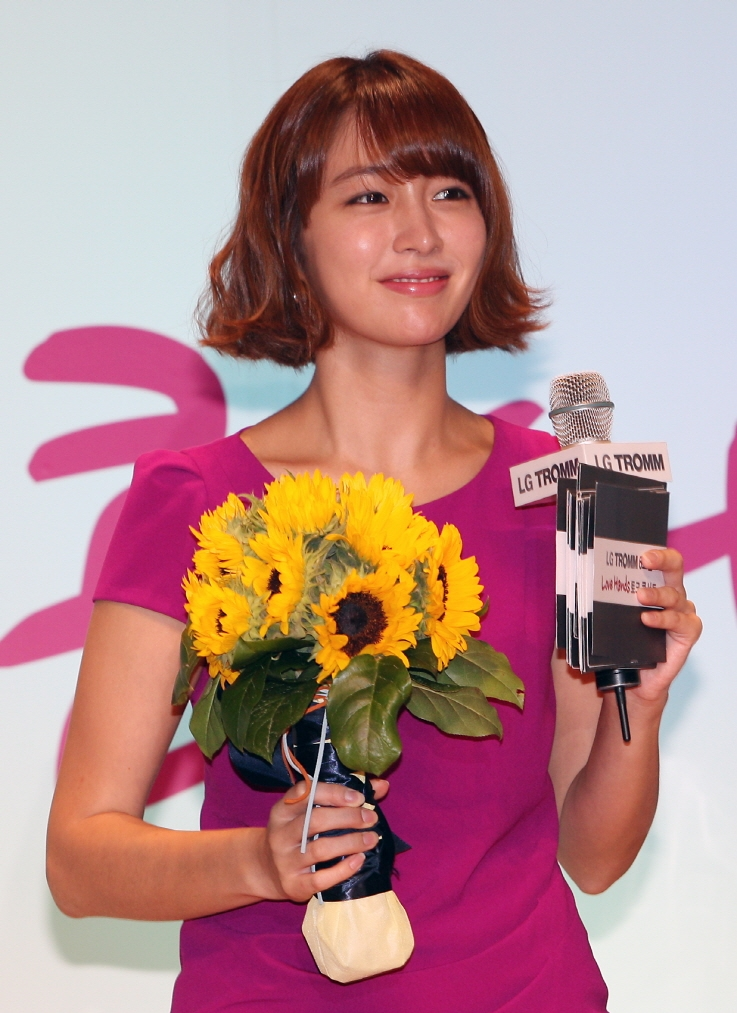
Lee at the LG Tromm Love Hands Talk Concert in 2012

Commercials and endorsements flooded in, and Lee gained a "goddess" label in the press. One of the challenges of her next film Wonderful Radio, was to strip her of that image. She successfully carried the film, with one review praising her as "expertly swinging from girly ditz, through self-centered pop diva (with memorable temper tantrums), to serious singer-songwriter." Co-star Lee Jung-jin said her actual personality is similar to the character's - "really upbeat and outgoing."

After playing a disillusioned fiancée to an ambitious fund manager in Midas, Lee returned to the romantic comedy genre in the body-swapping TV series Big written by the Hong sisters. In 2013 she starred in another rom-com series All About My Romance, about a secret relationship between two politicians of rival parties. This was followed by Cunning Single Lady in 2014, in which she played the titular character who schemes to win her ex-husband back now that he's rich and successful.

Lee made her acting comeback after three years in the SBS drama Come Back Mister with Rain. The series began airing in February 2016, and Lee won positive reviews for her performance.

In 2018, Lee returned with a SBS weekend drama Fates & Furies. She re-united with her former co-star Joo Sang-wook from Cunning Single Lady as main leads. In 2020, Lee gained widespread recognition portraying the role of Song Na-hee alongside actor Lee Sang-yeob in the weekend drama, Once Again.

== Personal life ==
Her maternal grandfather was renowned painter Park No-soo, who led the first generation of modern traditional Korean ink painters which emerged after the country's liberation from Japanese rule. Park died on February 25, 2013, at the age of 86.

Lee married actor Lee Byung-hun on August 10, 2013, at the Grand Hyatt Seoul. The couple had briefly dated in 2006, then resumed their relationship in 2012. She gave birth to their first child, Lee Joon-hoo, a boy, on March 31, 2015. On August 4, 2023, it was confirmed that she was expecting her second child. She gave birth to her second child, a daughter, on December 21, 2023.

== Filmography ==
=== Film ===
Year	Title	Role
1999	The Gate of Destiny	Icarus member
2003	Wishing Stairs	Jin-sung's ballet dance double
2004	Someone Special	Yi-yeon's friend
2005	Wet Dreams 2	Second year student #3
2006	Moodori	Yoon-hee
2007	Pruning the Grapevine	Yoon Soo-ah / Helena
2009	Searching for the Elephant	Soo-yeon
2009	White Night	Lee Si-yeong
2010	Cyrano Agency	Kim Hee-joong
2012	Wonderful Radio	Shin Jin-ah
2023	Switch	Gong Soo-hyun

=== Television series ===
Year	Title	Role
2005	Love and Sympathy	Kim Young-joo
2006	Love Me When You Can	Ha Jung-hwa
2007	Kimcheed Radish Cubes	Lee Min-do
2008	Who Are You?	Yang Ji-sook
2009	Boys Over Flowers	Ha Jae-kyung
2009	Smile, You	Seo Jung-in
2010	Sunday Drama Theater: "Lunch Box"	Hee-young
2011	Midas	Lee Jung-yeon
2012	Big	Gil Da-ran
2013	All About My Romance	Noh Min-young
2014	Cunning Single Lady	Na Ae-ra
2016	Come Back Mister	Shin Da-hye / Han Hong-nan
2018–2019	Fates & Furies	Goo Hae-ra
2020	Once Again	Song Na-hee
2026	OK! Let's Get Divorced	Baek Mi-young

=== Web series ===
Year	Title	Role	Ref.
2025	Villains	Han Soo-hyun	

=== Television shows ===
Year	Title	Role	Ref.
2019	The Barber of Seville	Cast member	
2021	Up Grademyself	MC	
2021	2021 Peace Concert - Heart, Connect	Host	
2023	Oh Eun-young Game	Host	

=== Music video appearances ===
Year	Song title	Artist
2005	"널 지켜줄게"	Player
2006	"Like a Man"	Fly to the Sky
2008	"Violin + Miss You"	Zia
2008	"Doll + A Man's Love"	Zia
2009	"Girls Like Bad Boys"	December
2009	"I Don't Care"	2NE1

== Theater ==
Year	Title	Role
2004	Taxi Driver	Hwa-yi
2004	Clumsy People	Yoo Hwa-yi
2007	The Game of Love and Chance	Silvia

== Discography ==
=== Soundtrack appearances ===
Title	Year	Album
"It Was You" (with Park Shin-hye)	2010	Cyrano Agency OST
"Again"	2012	Wonderful Radio OST
"Write the Truth"	2012	Wonderful Radio OST
"You're My Angel" (with Seo Young and Ahn Mi-na)	2012	Wonderful Radio OST

== Accolades ==
=== Awards and nominations ===
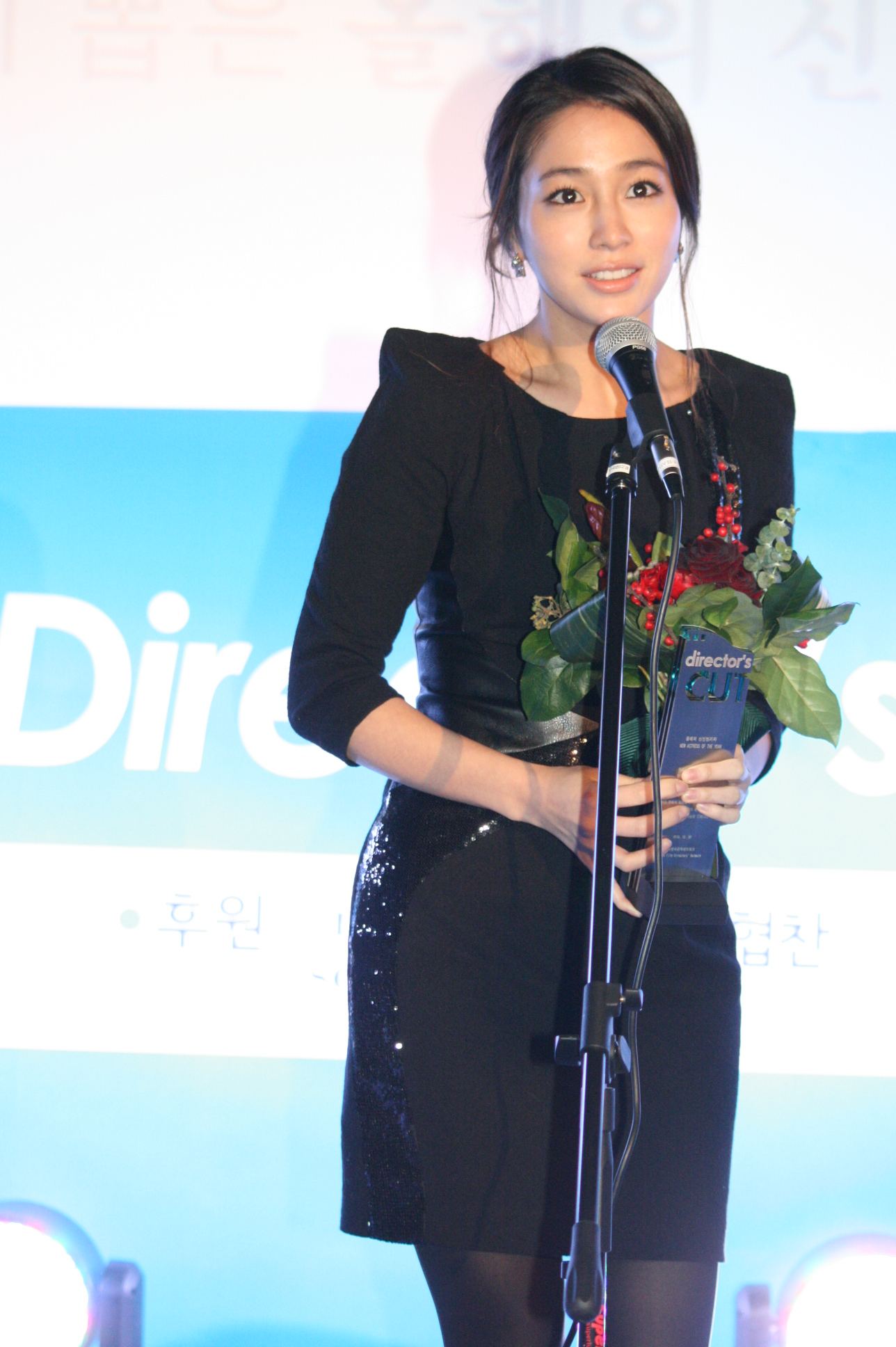
Lee at the 2010 Director's Cut Awards

Name of the award ceremony, year presented, category, nominee of the award, and the result of the nomination
Award ceremony	Year	Category	Nominee / Work	Result	Ref.
APAN Star Awards	2021	Top Excellence Award, Actress in a Serial Drama	Once Again	Won	
APAN Star Awards	2021	Popular Star Award, Actress	Once Again	Nominated	
Baeksang Arts Awards	2010	Best New Actress – Television	Smile, You	Nominated	
Baeksang Arts Awards	2011	Best New Actress – Film	Cyrano Agency	Nominated	
Baeksang Arts Awards	2011	InStyle Fashionista Award	Lee Min-jung	Won	
Blue Dragon Film Awards	2010	Best New Actress	Cyrano Agency	Won	
Cine21 Film Awards	2010	Best New Actress	Cyrano Agency	Won	
Director's Cut Awards	2010	Best New Actress	Cyrano Agency	Won	
Grand Bell Awards	2010	Best New Actress	Cyrano Agency	Won	
Grand Bell Awards	2010	Popularity Award, Actress	Cyrano Agency	Won	
Herald Donga TV Lifestyle Awards	2012	Style Icon Award	Lee Min-jung	Won	
KBS Drama Awards	2012	Excellence Award, Actress in a Miniseries	Big	Nominated	
KBS Drama Awards	2020	Top Excellence Award, Actress	Once Again	Won	
KBS Drama Awards	2020	Excellence Award, Actress in a Serial Drama	Once Again	Nominated	
KBS Drama Awards	2020	Netizen Award, Actress	Once Again	Nominated	
KBS Drama Awards	2020	Best Couple Award (with Lee Sang-yeob)	Once Again	Won	
Korean Association of Film Critics Awards	2010	Best New Actress	White Night	Won	
Korea Jewelry Awards	2010	Ruby Award	Lee Min-jung	Won	
Korea First Brand Awards	2026	Celebrity YouTuber (Female Category)	Lee Min-jung	Won	
MBC Drama Awards	2014	Top Excellence Award, Actress in a Miniseries	Cunning Single Lady	Nominated	
SBS Drama Awards	2009	New Star Award	Smile, You	Won	
SBS Drama Awards	2011	Excellence Award, Actress in a Special Planning Drama	Midas	Nominated	
SBS Drama Awards	2019	Top Excellence Award, Actress in a Mid-length Drama	Fates & Furies	Nominated	
Style Icon Awards	2010	Style Icon - Movie Actress	Cyrano Agency	Won	
University Film Festival of Korea	2010	Best New Actress	Cyrano Agency	Won	

=== State honors ===
Name of country, year given, and name of honor
Country or Organization	Year	Honor or Award	Ref.
Sungkyunkwan University	2021	Sungkyun Artist Award	

=== Listicles ===
Name of publisher, year listed, name of listicle, and placement
Publisher	Year	Listicle	Placement	Ref.
Forbes	2011	Korea Power Celebrity	29th	
Forbes	2012	Korea Power Celebrity	29th	
Forbes	2013	Korea Power Celebrity	37th	
