= Lee Hwa-kyum =

South Korean actress (born 1995)

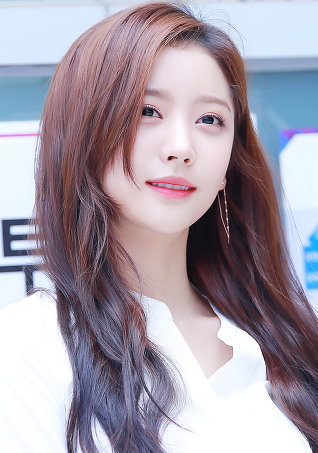
- Lee at community work in the general election in June 2018
- Born: Lee Yoo-young; January 23, 1995 (age 31); South Korea
- Education: Chung-Ang University – Theatre and Film
- Occupations: Actress; singer
- Years active: 2012–present
- Agent: Prain TPC
- Musical career
- Genres: K-pop
- Instrument: Vocals
- Years active: 2012–2019
- Label: Fantagio
- Formerly of: Hello Venus

Korean name
- Hangul: 이유영
- Hanja: 李瑜瑛
- RR: I Yuyeong
- MR: I Yuyŏng

Stage name
- Hangul: 이화겸
- Hanja: 李花兼
- RR: I Hwagyeom
- MR: I Hwagyŏm

Lee Yoo-young (Korean: 이유영; born January 23, 1995), known professionally as Lee Hwa-kyum (이화겸), is a South Korean actress and former singer. She is best known as a former member of the South Korean girl group Hello Venus. Following the group's disbandment, she turned to acting career.

== Early life and education ==
Lee was born on January 23, 1995. She has an older sister who is three years older than her. She got accepted into the Department of Theatre and Film at Chung-Ang University.

== Career ==
Lee was introduced as a member of the South Korean girl group Hello Venus. They debuted with their EPs album Venus on May 10, 2012. On March 14, 2013, Lee made her acting debut in the SBS television series Wonderful Mama which premiered on April 13.

After Hello Venus disbandment on April 26, 2019, she continued to promote as an actress under the new stage name, Lee Hwa-kyum. On June 28, 2021, it was announced that Lee had signed a contract with Prain TPC. On March 24, 2023, It was confirmed that Lee had decided to renew her contract with Prain TPC.

== Personal life ==
=== Marriage ===
On March 13, 2026, Lee announced through an Instagram post that she would be marrying her non-celebrity partner.

== Filmography ==
=== Film ===
Year	Title	Role	Ref.
2014	Futureless Things	Hana	
2014	Slow Video	Yeo Jang-mi	

=== Television series ===
Year	Title	Role	Notes	Ref.
2012	Take Care of Us, Captain	Stewardess	Cameo with Kwon Na-ra	
2013	Wonderful Mama	Jang Go-eun		
2014	Cunning Single Lady	Pi Song-hee		
2014	Mother's Garden	Na Hye-rin		
2015	Who Are You: School 2015	Jo Hae-na		
2017	Circle	Secretary Shin		
2019	When the Devil Calls Your Name	Joo Ra-in		
2019	Queen: Love and War	Kim Song-yi	Credited as Lee Hwa-kyum	
2021	Monthly Magazine Home	Yook Mi-ra		
2021	One the Woman	Kim Eun-jung / Kang Mi-na (after surgery)		
2022	Under the Queen's Umbrella	Royal Consort Sug-won Ok		
2024	Face Me	Jung Hee-young		
2024–2025	Who Is She	Lina		
2025	Salon De Holmes	Yoon-joo		

=== Web series ===
Year	Title	Role	Notes	Ref.
2013	After School – Luck or Not		Cameo with Hello Venus members	
2015	To Be Continued		Cameo	
2017	Birth of a Professional	Lee Mi-so		
2017	Idol Fever	Byung-chul		
2018	Drunk in Good Taste	Tae-yi		

=== Television shows ===
Year	Title	Role	Ref.
2012	Tooniverse's Superhero	Co-host	

=== Music video appearances ===
Year	Song Title	Artist	Ref.
2018	"Twenty-something"	Song Joo-hee	
