= Sticky Sticky =

Single by Hello Venus
- B-side: "Whisky"
- Released: November 6, 2014
- Recorded: 2014
- Genre: K-pop; dance-pop
- Length: 3:26
- Label: Fantagio Music; NHN Entertainment
- Songwriters: Brave Brothers, Elephant Kingdom
- Producer: Brave Brothers

Hello Venus singles chronology
"Would You Stay For Tea?" (2013)	"Sticky Sticky" (2014)	"Wiggle Wiggle" (2015)

"Sticky Sticky" is a song by South Korean girl group Hello Venus. It was released on November 6, 2014 under Fantagio and is the group's fourth single overall. It is the first release to feature new members Seoyoung and Yeoreum following the departures of Yooara and Yoonjo after Pledis Entertainment and Fantagio had ended their partnership in July 2014.

== Music video ==
The music video was released on November 6, 2014 and is directed by Hong Won-ki of Zanybros.

== Track listing ==
Tracklist
No.	Title	Lyrics	Music	Length
1.	"Hellovenus"	Chakun	Chakun, Mr. Kang	1:23
2.	"Sticky Sticky" (끈적끈적)	Brave Brothers	Brave Brothers, Elephant Kingdom	3:26
3.	"Whisky" (위스키)	Chakun	Chakun, Elephant Kingdom	3:13
4.	"Sticky Sticky (Instrumental)"		Brave Brothers, Elephant Kingdom	3:26

== Charts ==
=== Single charts ===
Country	Chart (2014)	Peak position
South Korea	Gaon Digital Chart	87
South Korea	Gaon Download chart	69
South Korea	Gaon BGM chart	34
South Korea	Gaon Social chart	15

=== Album charts ===
Country	Chart	Peak position
South Korea	Gaon Weekly albums chart	6
South Korea	Gaon Monthly albums chart	17

=== Sales ===
Chart	Amount
Gaon physical sales	7,488

== Release history ==
Region	Date	Format	Label	Catalog
South Korea	November 6, 2014	CD single, digital download	Fantagio Music; Neowiz Bugs; Windmill Media	WMCD-0268
Worldwide	November 6, 2014	Digital download	Fantagio Music	
