= Joo Sang-wook =

South Korean actor (born 1978)

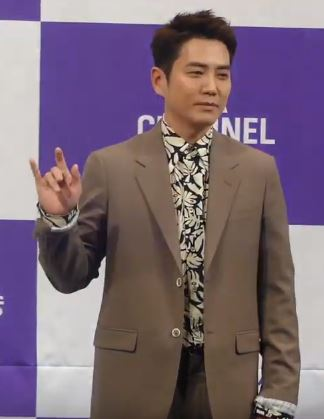
- Joo in 2020
- Born: July 18, 1978 (age 48); Seoul, South Korea
- Education: Namseoul University – Visual Design
- Occupation: Actor
- Years active: 1998–present
- Agent(s): HB Entertainment; Will Entertainment
- Spouse: Cha Ye-ryun (m. 2017)
- Children: 1

Korean name
- Hangul: 주상욱
- Hanja: 朱相昱
- RR: Ju Sanguk
- MR: Chu Sanguk

Joo Sang-wook (Korean: 주상욱; born July 18, 1978) is a South Korean actor. He is best known for his roles in generational saga Giant, medical drama Good Doctor, romantic comedy Cunning Single Lady, Birth of a Beauty, and crime procedural Special Affairs Team TEN.

== Personal life ==
Joo Sang-wook and actress Cha Ye-ryun had been dating since March 2016, and married in May 2017. Cha announced that she was expecting their first child in December 2017. They had a girl on July 31, 2018.

== Filmography ==
=== Film ===
Year	Title	Role	Ref.
2006	Arang	Jae-hyuk	
2007	The Perfect Couple	Kim Jong-hyuk (cameo)	
2008	My Wife Got Married	Han Jae-kyung	
2010	No Mercy	Lee Sung-ho's defense lawyer (cameo)	
2012	The Scent	Han Gil-ro	
2012	90 Minutes	Sang-hee	
2013	Days of Wrath	Joon-seok	
2014	The Huntresses	Sa-hyun	
2015	Trot	Jae-gu	

=== Television series ===
Key
†	Denotes television productions that have not yet been released

Year	Title	Role	Ref.
1997	Docu X	Lee Jin-soo	
1998	New Generation Report: Adults Don't Know		
1998	Tomorrow	Park Geon	
1999	Make Your Dreams Come True	Park Geon	
2006	MBC Best Theater		
2007	Air City	Ahn Kang-hyun	
2007	Kimcheed Radish Cubes	Park Jae-woo	
2007	Drama City "North Koreans to Come Out of Hiding"	Park	
2008	Drama City "The Love Revenger, Miss Jo"	Lee Ki-hyeon	
2008	One Mom and Three Dads	Jung Chan-young	
2008	Chunja's Special Day	Lee Joo-hyuk	
2009	The Accidental Couple	Kim Kang-mo	
2009	Queen Seondeok	Wolya	
2010	Giant	Jo Min-woo	
2011	Paradise Ranch	Seo Yun-ho	
2011	My Princess	Hyun-woo (cameo, ep 9)	
2011	The Thorn Birds	Lee Young-jo	
2011	Special Affairs Team TEN	Yeo Ji-hoon	
2011	You're Here, You're Here, You're Really Here	Sang-hoon (cameo)	
2012	Feast of the Gods	Choi Jae-ha	
2013	Special Affairs Team TEN 2	Yeo Ji-hoon	
2013	Good Doctor	Kim Do-han	
2013	After School: Lucky or Not	cameo, ep 3	
2013	Waiting for Love	Restaurant staff (cameo, ep 2)	
2014	I Need Romance 3	Joo-yeon's ex-boyfriend (cameo, ep 1)	
2014	Birth of a Beauty	Han Tae-hee	
2014	Cunning Single Lady	Cha Jung-woo	
2015	Glamorous Temptation	Jin Hyung-woo	
2015	The Man in the Mask	Ha Dae-chul	
2016	Fantastic	Ryu Hae-sung	
2018	Grand Prince	Lee Kang	
2018	Fates & Furies	Tae In-joon	
2019	Welcome to Waikiki 2	Kang Min-ho (cameo, ep 2)	
2020	Touch	Cha Jeong Hyeok	
2021–2022	The King of Tears, Lee Bang-won	Yi Bang-won	
2022	Alchemy of Souls	Jang Gang (Cameo)	
2023	True to Love	Han Sang-jin	
2026	Agent Kim Reactivated	Joo Kang-chan	

=== Variety show ===
Year	Title	Role	Notes/Ref.
2012–2013	Qualifications of Men	Regular cast member	
2022	Golf Battle: Birdie Buddies	Contestant	Season 4
2022	Korean Food Chronicle	Presenter	Episode 1–4
2022–2023	Second House	Cast Member	Season 1–2

=== Music video appearances ===
Year	Song title	Artist
2011	"Stay the Night"	Jeong Seung-won
2012	"Be With You"	The SeeYa
2012	"Venus"	Hello Venus

=== Hosting ===
Year	Title	Notes	Ref.
2022	17th Seoul International Drama Awards	with Jung Eun-ji	

== Discography ==
Year	Artist	Song title	Album
2009	Park Sang-min feat. Joo Sang-wook	비가 와요 ("It's Raining")	It's Raining 12th Special Edition
2009	Joo Sang-wook	그대가 그립습니다 ("I Miss You")	Queen Seondeok Special OST

== Awards and nominations ==
Year	Award	Category	Nominated work	Result	Ref.
2010	SBS Drama Awards	New Star Award	Giant	Won	
2010	SBS Drama Awards	Best Couple Award with Hwang Jung-eum	Giant	Won	
2011	6th Asia Model Awards	Model Star Award	—N/a	Won	
2011	4th Korea Drama Awards	Best Supporting Actor	Giant, The Thorn Birds	Won	
2011	5th Asia Jewelry Awards	Diamond Award, Actor category	—N/a	Won	
2011	KBS Drama Awards	Excellence Award, Actor in a Mid-length Drama	The Thorn Birds	Nominated	
2011	KBS Drama Awards	Netizen Award, Actor	The Thorn Birds	Nominated	
2012	1st K-Drama Star Awards	Excellence Award, Actor	Feast of the Gods	Nominated	
2012	KBS Entertainment Awards	Best Male Newcomer in a Variety Show	Qualifications of Men	Won	
2012	MBC Drama Awards	Top Excellence Award, Actor in a Special Project Drama	Feast of the Gods	Nominated	
2013	Herald DongA TV Lifestyle Awards	Best Dressed	—N/a	Won	
2013	6th Korea Drama Awards	Top Excellence Award, Actor	Good Doctor	Nominated	
2013	2nd APAN Star Awards	Excellence Award, Actor	Good Doctor	Nominated	
2013	KBS Drama Awards	Excellence Award, Actor in a Mid-length Drama	Good Doctor	Won	
2013	KBS Drama Awards	Netizen Award, Actor	Good Doctor	Nominated	
2014	MBC Drama Awards	Excellence Award, Actor in a Miniseries	Cunning Single Lady	Nominated	
2014	MBC Drama Awards	Popularity Award, Actor	Cunning Single Lady	Nominated	
2014	SBS Drama Awards	Excellence Award, Actor in a Drama Special	Birth of a Beauty	Nominated	
2014	SBS Drama Awards	Best Couple Award with Han Ye-seul	Birth of a Beauty	Won	
2014	SBS Drama Awards	Top 10 Stars	Birth of a Beauty	Won	
2015	MBC Drama Awards	Excellence Award, Actor in a Special Project Drama	Glamorous Temptation	Nominated	
2015	KBS Drama Awards	Excellence Award, Actor in a Miniseries	The Man in the Mask	Nominated	
2019	SBS Drama Awards	Top Excellence Award, Actor in a Mid-length Drama	Fates & Furies	Nominated	
2022	8th APAN Star Awards	Top Excellence Award, Actor in a Serial Drama	The King of Tears, Lee Bang-won	Won	
2022	2022 KBS Entertainment Awards	Excellence Award in Reality Category	2nd House	Nominated	
2022	2022 KBS Entertainment Awards	Best Couple Award (with Jo Jae-yoon)	2nd House	Won	
2022	KBS Drama Awards	Grand Prize (Daesang)	The King of Tears, Lee Bang-won	Won	
2022	KBS Drama Awards	Top Excellence Award, Actor	The King of Tears, Lee Bang-won	Nominated	
2022	KBS Drama Awards	Excellence Award, Actor in a Serial Drama	The King of Tears, Lee Bang-won	Nominated	
