= Namseoul University =

Private university in Cheonan, South Korea

Coordinates: 36°54′28.59″N 127°8′35.33″E

- Motto: Love, Creation, Service
- Type: Private
- Established: 1994
- Students: 16,375 (2011)
- Location: Cheonan, Republic of Korea
- Website: www.nsu.ac.kr

Korean name
- Hangul: 남서울대학교
- Hanja: 南서울大學校
- RR: Namseoul daehakgyo
- MR: Namsŏul taehakkyo

Namseoul University (Korean: 남서울대학교) is a private university located in Cheonan, South Korea. The institution was initially founded as the Southern Seoul Industrial University in 1994 and renamed to Namseoul University in 1998.

== History ==
Namseoul University began accepting students in 1994. Dr. Ho Keun Kim became its first president of Namseoul University.

The university opened with nine departments: Computer Science, Electrical Engineering, Information and Technology, Communication Studies, Industrial Design, Business Management, Marketing, English and Japanese.

The university expanded its educational offerings over the following eight years by adding seven academic departments. The first graduation ceremony was held on February 20, 1998. In 2007, the university opened the Graduate School of Child Behavior Therapy.

In 2008, the university opened an International Exchanges and Cooperation Center (IECC) in India. 2008 also saw the introduction of the university's Architectural Engineering, Nursing Science, Geriatric Welfare, and Clinical Pathology programs.

In 2016 the university began offering master's degrees taught in English by English speaking professors. Originally this was offered under the umbrella of the Korean Graduate School's Global Education Institute. However, by 2017 the program had grown substantially and Namseoul University formed a separate graduate school. It is now known as the Namseoul University International Graduate School.

== Undergraduate Courses ==
Liberal Arts and Government

=== Engineering ===
- Electronic engineering
- Computer science
- Information and communications
- Architecture
- Architectural engineering
- Multimedia
- Industrial engineering
- Geographic information science

=== Art & Physical Education ===
- Visual information design
- Environment molding
- Motion Arts Design
- Sports business administration
- Exercise health

=== Business & Public Administration ===
- International distribution
- International trade
- Business administration
- Advertising and public relations
- Hotel management
- Tourism management
- Tax in Korean
- Real estate
- Accounting

=== Humanities & Social Studies ===
- English
- Japanese
- Chinese
- Child welfare
- Social welfare
- Elderly welfare

=== Health & Health Care ===
- Health administration
- Dental hygiene
- Physical therapy
- Nursing
- Clinical pathology
- Emergency medical technology

== Postgraduate Departments ==
- Electronic engineering
- Architecture
- Architectural engineering
- Industrial engineering
- Geographic information science
- Visual Information Design
- Glass molding
- Architectural ceramic design
- Animation
- Sports business administration
- Sports and leisure
- Retail marketing
- Business administration
- International distribution
- Hotel food service administration
- Tourism management
- Tax
- Real estate
- Chinese
- Child counseling psychotherapy
- Social welfare and child care administration
- Elderly welfare
- Public health administration
- Dental hygiene
- Nursing
- Clinical pathology
- Exercise prescription
- Physical therapy
- Welfare administration

== International Postgraduate Departments (All Courses Taught in English) ==
- Master's in Global Techno-Entrepreneurship
- Master's in International Education
- Master's in International Legal Studies
- Master's in Global Physiotherapy
- Master's in Global Addiction Rehabilitation Counseling

== Campus ==
- Gong Hak 1Kan (Building No. 1)
- Gong Hak 2Kan (Building No. 2)
- Sang Kyung HakKan (Building No. 3)
- Student Hall Annex (Building No. 4)
- Tue Articles of Incorporation (Building No. 5)
- Formative Gakkan (Building No. 7)
- Students Welfare Hall (Building No. 8)
- Carcinoma Memorial Central Library (Building No. 9)
- Humanities and Social Gakkan (Building No. 10)
- Aelrim dormitory (Building No. 11)

== Notable people ==
- Joo Sang-wook, actor
- Park Hae-il, actor
