= Paradise (Hello Venus song) =

Single by Hello Venus

from the album Mystery of Venus
- Released: July 18, 2016
- Recorded: 2016 (South Korea)
- Length: 3:31
- Label: Fantagio Music
- Songwriter(s): Yorkie, Ryu
- Producer(s): Devine Channel, Nikki Paige

Hello Venus singles chronology
"Glow" (2016)	"Paradise" (2016)	"Runway" (2016)

Music video
- "Paradise" on YouTube

"Paradise" is a song recorded by South Korean girl group Hello Venus as the second collaboration with producing and writing team Devine Channel. It was released on July 18, 2016 by Fantagio Music. The lyrics were written by Yorkie and Ryu and the music was composed by Devine Channel and Nikki Paige. A music video for the song was also released on July 18.

== Background and release ==
On July 10, 2016, Fantagio Music announced that a second collaboration song between Hello Venus and Devine Channel will be released. On July 11, it was reported that a music video for the upcoming song was already shot and that the collaboration is titled 'Hello Venus x Devine Channel: Part 2, Paradise'. On July 14, it was revealed that "Paradise" will be released on July 18.

The song was released on July 18 in South Korea on MelOn as a digital download and worldwide on iTunes. The music video was released on the same day.

== Track listing ==
Digital download

No.	Title	Lyrics	Music	Arrangement	Length
1.	"Paradise"	Yorkie; Ryu	Devine Chanel; Nikki Paige	Devine Channel	3:31

== Release history ==
Region	Date	Format	Distributor
South Korea	July 18, 2016	Digital download	Fantagio Music
Worldwide	July 18, 2016	Digital download	Fantagio Music
