= Alice (South Korean singer) =

South Korean singer and actress (born 1990)

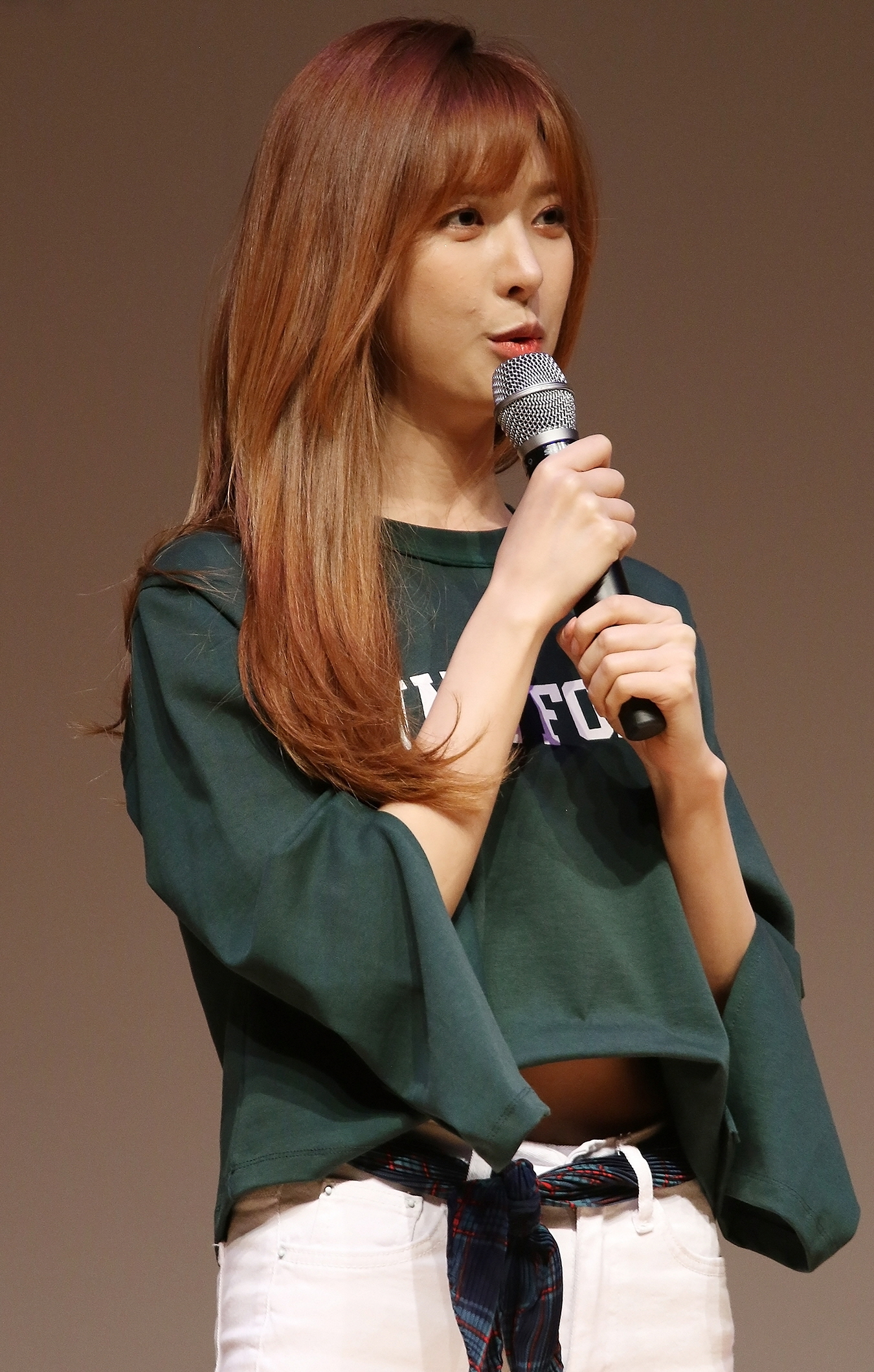
- Alice in May 2016
- Born: Song Joo-hee; March 21, 1990 (age 36); South Korea
- Occupations: Singer; actress
- Musical career
- Genre: K-pop
- Instrument: Vocals
- Years active: 2012–present
- Labels: Fantagio; Pop Music; Kingsland
- Formerly of: Hello Venus

Korean name
- Hangul: 송주희
- RR: Song Juhui
- MR: Song Chuhŭi

Song Joo-hee (Korean: 송주희; born March 21, 1990), better known by her stage name Alice (Korean: 앨리스), is a South Korean singer and actress. She is best known as a former member and leader of the South Korean girl group Hello Venus, formed by Fantagio in 2012. She made her solo debut on January 3, 2018, with the digital single "Twenty-something". Since 2020, she has used her birth name for her acting work.

== Career ==
=== 2012–2019: Debut with Hello Venus ===
Song debuted as a member and leader of Hello Venus on May 9, 2012. The girl group, formed through a joint venture between Pledis Entertainment and Fantagio, released material through 2019, when the group disbanded after its members' contracts expired.

Beyond her group activities, Song expanded into acting and musical theatre starting in 2014, appearing in the MBC dramas The Night Watchman's Journal and The Single Woman with a Cunning Heart, the web drama After School: Luck or Not 2, and the KBS2 drama Strange Daughter-in-law, and by 2016 had taken roles in stage musicals including All Shook Up, Nonsense 2, and Cheongchun Ilbal Jangjeon, later starring in A Better Tomorrow (musical). In 2015, she made a special appearance in the SBS drama To Be Continued, portraying a member of a fictional girl group.

=== 2018–2019: Solo debut with "Twenty-something" ===
On January 3, 2018, Song released her first personal digital single as a soloist, "Twenty-something" ("재미없을 나이"), under her birth name, as part of Fantagio Music's FM201.8 digital-single project.

=== 2020–present: Continued acting roles and solo music ===
On April 9, 2020, Song signed an exclusive contract with Kingsland Company to focus on her acting career, and began crediting her acting work to her birth name, Song Joo-hee, rather than her stage name. On September 3, 2021, she signed with the music agency Pop Music (later A2Z Entertainment) and released a string of solo singles, including "Eventually", "Secret", and "I Love You".

On May 10, 2022, to mark the tenth anniversary of both her own debut and Hello Venus's debut, Song released the single "Drive Away". On July 5, 2022, she made a special guest appearance, credited under her birth name, in the KBS2 drama Minamdang: Boy Who Reads Minds ("미남당").

== Personal life ==
On October 7, 2023, Song's agency announced that she would marry her non-celebrity boyfriend on October 21, 2023, in a private ceremony in Seoul. The same announcement noted that following Hello Venus's 2019 disbandment, Song had appeared in the television dramas Take Revenge and Doom at Your Service.

== Discography ==
=== Singles ===
| Title | Year | Album |
|---|---|---|
| "Twenty-something" | 2018 | Non-album single |
| "Eventually" | 2021 | Non-album single |
| "Secret" | 2021 | Non-album single |
| "I Love You" | 2021 | Non-album single |
| "Drive Away" | 2022 | Non-album single |

== Filmography ==
=== Television series ===
| Year | Title | Role | Notes | Ref. |
|---|---|---|---|---|
| 2014 | The Night Watchman's Journal | Meixiang | | |
| 2014 | The Single Woman with a Cunning Heart | | Special appearance | |
| 2014 | After School: Luck or Not 2 | Female lead | Web drama | |
| 2015 | To Be Continued | Member of fictional girl group SUNHYUK | Special appearance | |
| 2015 | Strange Daughter-in-law | Member of fictional girl group Ruby | Special appearance | |
| 2021 | Doom at Your Service | Jo Ye-ji | | |
| 2021 | Take Revenge | | | |
| 2022 | Minamdang: Boy Who Reads Minds | | Special appearance, credited as Song Joo-hee | |

=== Musicals ===
| Year | Title | Role | Ref. |
|---|---|---|---|
| 2016 | All Shook Up | Sandra | |
| 2017 | Nonsense 2 | | |
| 2019 | Cheongchun Ilbal Jangjeon | | |
| 2020 | A Better Tomorrow | Female lead | |
