= Kwon Nara =

South Korean actress (born 1991)

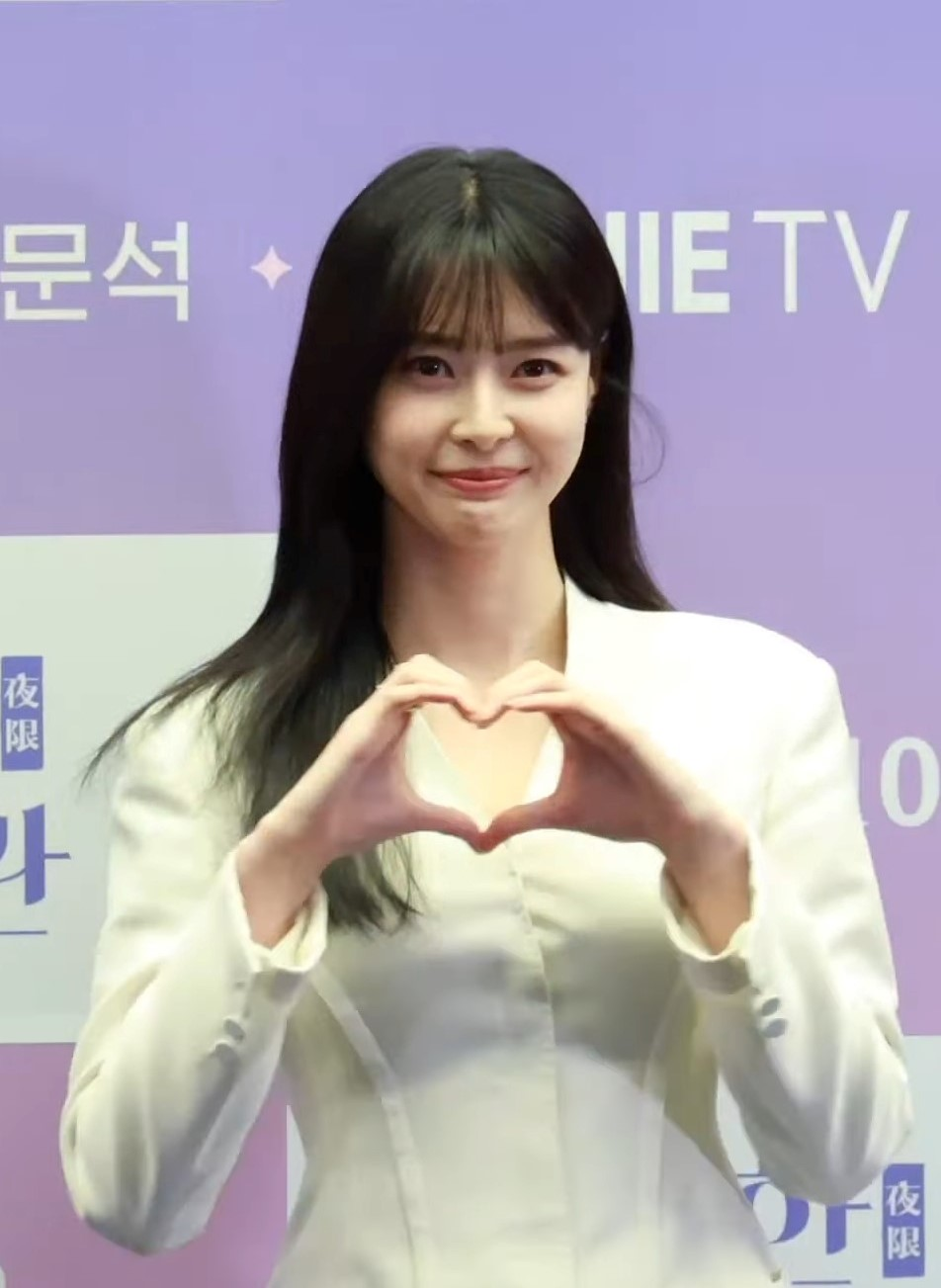
- Kwon in 2024
- Born: Kwon Ah-yoon; March 13, 1991 (age 35); Incheon, South Korea
- Education: Dongduk Women's University
- Occupation: Actress
- Years active: 2012–present
- Agent: Ghost Studio
- Musical career
- Genre: K-pop
- Instrument: Vocals
- Years active: 2012–2019
- Label: Fantagio
- Formerly of: Hello Venus

Korean name
- Hangul: 권아윤
- Hanja: 權我潤
- RR: Gwon Ayun
- MR: Kwŏn Ayun

Stage name
- Hangul: 권나라
- RR: Gwon Nara
- MR: Kwŏn Nara
- Website: ghoststudio.net

Kwon Ah-yoon (Korean: 권아윤; born March 13, 1991), known professionally as Kwon Nara (권나라), is a South Korean actress and former singer. Before she transitioned to acting career she was best known as one of the original members of the South Korean girl group Hello Venus.

== Career ==
=== Beginnings and acting debut ===
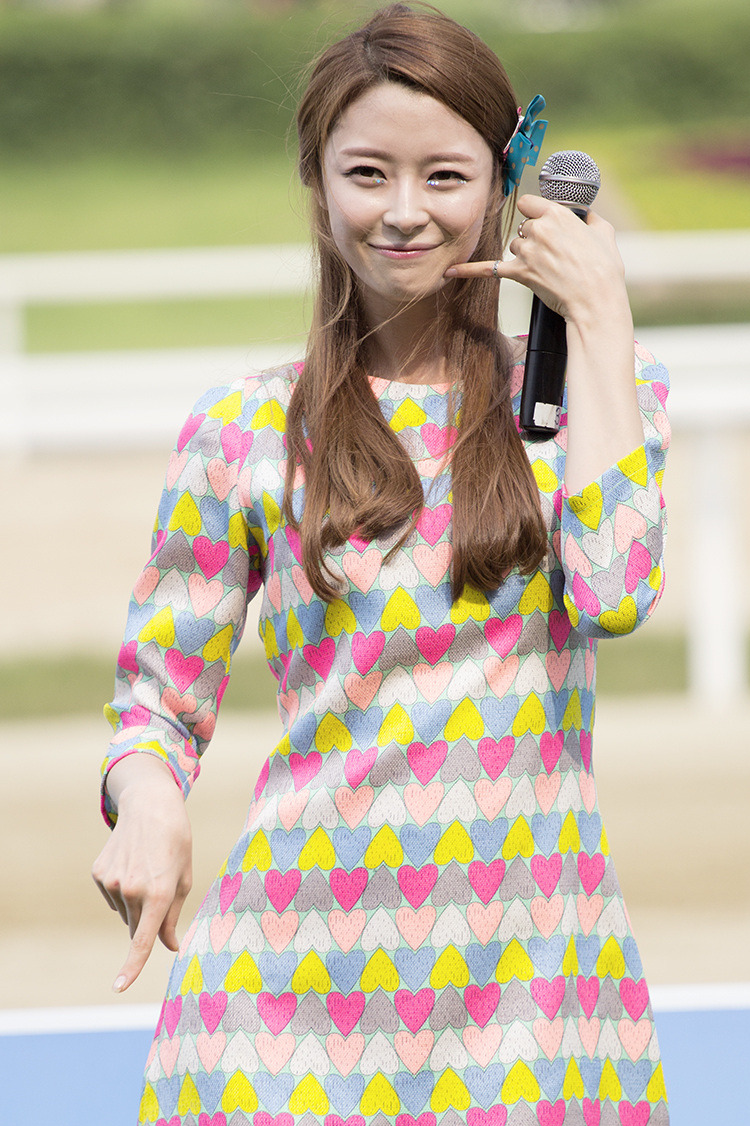
Kwon in June 2013

Nara became an acting trainee for Fantagio Entertainment when she was in middle school. She joined the girl group Hello Venus as a founding member where she went by the stage name "Nara". They debuted on May 9, 2012, with the mini-album Venus, which contained four tracks. The single "Venus" reached number 35 on the Gaon chart.

Aside from her group activities, Nara appeared as a cameo role as a stewardess on the 20th episode of the SBS drama Take Care of Us, Captain with fellow Hello Venus member, Yooyoung.

=== 2017–present: Rise in popularity and lead roles ===
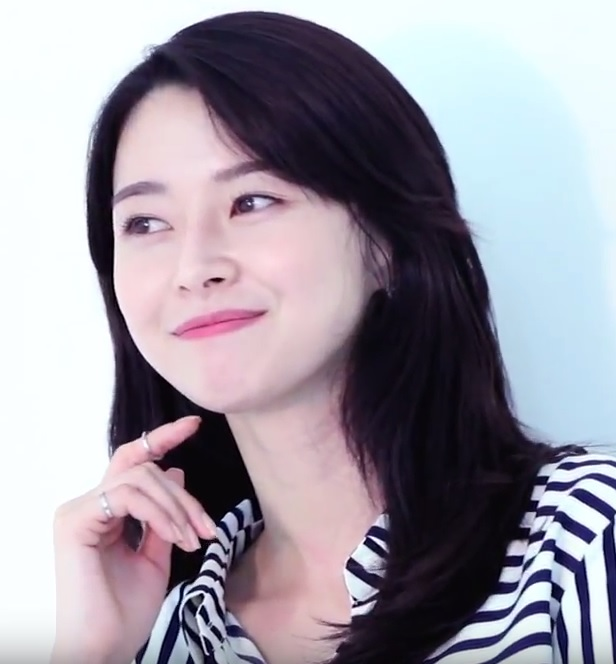
Kwon in August 2017

In 2017, Nara played her first major acting role in SBS's romantic comedy drama Suspicious Partner. In 2018, Nara starred tvN's melodrama My Mister, followed by SBS legal drama Your Honor.

In 2019, Nara got her first lead role in the KBS' medical prison drama Doctor Prisoner. In June 2019, Nara signed with new agency A-Man Project.

In 2020, she starred in JTBC drama Itaewon Class, based on the webtoon of the same name. The series was a commercial success and became the seventh highest-rated Korean dramas in cable television history. She was also cast in historical comedy TV series Royal Secret Agent as Hong Da-In, a courtesan whose beauty is comparable to Hwang Jini.

In March 2021, Nara was confirmed to be starring in tvN's fantasy drama Bulgasal: Immortal Souls. in the role of Min Sang-woon, a woman who used to be an immortal, but goes through a tragic event that turns her into a human. The drama premiered in December 2021.

In June 2022, Nara signed with new agency C-JeS Entertainment. In September 2022, Nara joined an essemble casts featuring actors from television dramas Love in the Moonlight, Itaewon Class, and The Sound of Magic in the TVING-produced reality tv show Young Actors' Retreat.

== Filmography ==
=== Film ===
Year	Title	Role	Notes	Ref.
2006	Mr. Wacky	High School Girl	Cameo	
2018	Fantasy of the Girls	Ha-nam		

=== Television series ===
Year	Title	Role	Notes	Ref.
2012	Take Care of Us, Captain		Cameo	
2014	I Need Romance Season 3		Cameo	
2014	Single Cunning Lady		Cameo	
2016	Entertainer	Song-hee	Cameo	
2017	Suspicious Partner	Cha Yoo-jung		
2018	My Mister	Choi Yoo-ra		
2018	Your Honor	Joo-eun		
2019	Doctor Prisoner	Han So-geum		
2020	Itaewon Class	Oh Soo-ah		
2020–2021	Royal Secret Agent	Hong Da-in		
2021–2022	Bulgasal: Immortal Souls	Min Sang-woon / Kim Hwa-yeon		
2024	The Midnight Studio	Han Bom		
2025	Knock-Off	Moon Yoo-bin		

=== Web series ===
Year	Title	Role	Notes	Ref.
2013	After School – Lucky or Not		Cameo	
2014	After School – Lucky or Not 2	Mal-soon	Cameo	

=== Television shows ===
Year	Title	Role	Notes	Ref.
2016	Law of the Jungle in East Timor	Cast member	Episode 238–240	

=== Web shows ===
Year	Title	Role	Ref.
2022	Young Actors' Retreat	Cast member	

== Accolades ==
=== Awards and nominations ===
Name of the award ceremony, year presented, category, nominee of the award, and the result of the nomination
Award ceremony	Year	Category	Nominee / Work	Result	Ref.
Baeksang Arts Awards	2019	Best New Actress – Television	My Mister	Nominated	
Baeksang Arts Awards	2020	Best Supporting Actress – Television	Itaewon Class	Nominated	
KBS Drama Awards	2019	Excellence Award, Actress in a Miniseries	Doctor Prisoner	Nominated	
KBS Drama Awards	2019	Best New Actress	Doctor Prisoner	Won	
KBS Drama Awards	2019	Netizen Award	Doctor Prisoner	Nominated	
KBS Drama Awards	2021	Excellence Award, Actress in a Miniseries	Royal Secret Agent	Won	
Korea Drama Awards	2019	Best New Actress	Doctor Prisoner	Won	
SBS Drama Awards	2017	Best New Actress	Suspicious Partner	Nominated	
SBS Drama Awards	2018	Best New Actress	Your Honor	Nominated	
Seoul International Drama Awards	2021	Outstanding Korean Actress	Royal Secret Agent	Nominated	

=== Listicles ===
Name of publisher, year listed, name of listicle, and placement
Publisher	Year	Listicle	Placement	Ref.
Forbes	2020	Korea Power Celebrity 40	33rd	
