= Doctor Prisoner =

2019 South Korean television series

- Promotional poster
- Also known as: Dr. Prisoner
- Hangul: 닥터 프리즈너
- RR: Dakteo peurijeuneo
- MR: Takt'ŏ p'ŭrijŭnŏ
- Genre: Medical drama
- Created by: KBS Drama Division
- Written by: Park Kye-ok
- Directed by: Hwang In-hyuk
- Starring: Namkoong Min; Kwon Nara; Kim Byung-chul; Choi Won-young
- Composer: Park Se-joon
- Country of origin: South Korea
- Original language: Korean
- No. of episodes: 32 (Note: In order to circumvent Korean laws that prevent commercial breaks in the middle of an episode, what would previously have been aired as single 70 minute episodes are now being repackaged as two 35 minute episodes, with two episodes being shown each night with a commercial break between the two.)

Production
- Executive producer: Hwang Eui-kyung (KBS)
- Producers: Ahn Hyung-joo; Kang Min-kyung
- Camera setup: Single-camera
- Running time: 35 minutes
- Production company: Jidam Inc.

Original release
- Network: KBS2; AXN Korea
- Release: March 20 – May 15, 2019

Doctor Prisoner (Korean: 닥터 프리즈너) is a 2019 South Korean television series starring Namkoong Min, Kwon Nara, Choi Won-young and Kim Byung-chul. It aired on KBS2's Wednesdays and Thursdays at 22:00 (KST) from March 20 to May 15, 2019.

== Synopsis ==
A skilled doctor is forced to quit working at a hospital after being falsely accused of medical malpractice by a spoiled son of a wealthy chaebol who owns the hospital where he works. He starts working in a prison that reserved for the elites with the goal of acquiring enough connections to take his revenge.

== Cast ==
=== Main ===
- Namkoong Min as Na Yi-je

A talented doctor who always cares about his patients but has to quit the hospital after an incident happens.

- Kwon Nara as Han So-geum

A psychiatrist who works at Taegang Hospital and volunteers in prison.

- Kim Byung-chul as Seon Min-sik

A medical director who works at the prison.

- Choi Won-young as Lee Jae-joon

Primary successor to major conglomerate Taegang Group.

=== Recurring ===
- Jin Hee-kyung as Mo Yi-ra

A former actress who becomes the second wife of Lee Duk-sung.

- Lee Da-in as Lee Jae-in

Youngest daughter of the Taegang family who has both looks and brains. In order to protect her family, she enters law school to become a lawyer.

- Park Eun-seok as Lee Jae-hwan

Second son of the Taegang family. His insecurity as the son of the second wife makes him a troublemaker.

- Lee Min-young as Bok Hye-soo

A medical pharmacist. Na Yi-je saved her brother when the latter was an inmate.

- Lee Jun-hyeok as Go Young-cheol

A funny medical doctor who is secretly working for Lee Jae-joon.

- Kang Shin-il as Kim Sang-chun

An inmate who was sentenced to life in prison.

- Jang Joon-nyoung as Tae Choon-Ho

Friend of the inmate Kim Sang-Chun

- Lee Yong-joon as Hyun Jae-min
- Lee Hyun-jyun as Supervisor Ham Gil-Sun
- Park Soo-young as Supervisor Oh Cheol-Min
- Kang Hong-seok as Shin Hyun-Sang

The Head of the Thug inmates group

- Jang Hyun-sung as Prosecutor Jung Wi-sik
- Bae Yoon-kyung as Jung Se-jin
- Ha Young as Na Yi-hyeon
- Kim Jung-nan as Oh Jung-Hee
- Choi Deok-moon as Center Chief of Taegang Hospital
- Chae Dong-hyun as Choi Dong-Hoon

Doctor at Taegang Hospital

- Kim Dae-ryeong as Choi Jung-Woo

Secretary of Lee Jae-Joon

- Woo Mi-hwa as Kim Young-Sun

Wife of Director Seon Min-sik

- Kang Ji-hoo as Prosecutor Kang
- Nam Kyoung-eub as Congressman Jung Min-Je
- Oh Dong-min as Moon Yong-Sung
- Jung In-gyeom as Seon Min-Joong
- Ryeoun as Han Bit

Younger brother of Han So-geum

- Song Duk-ho as Surgical intern

=== Special appearances ===
- Park Ji-yeon as Ha-Eun's mother (ep.1-2)
- Lee Joo-seung as Kim Seok-woo (Ep. 3, 9-12)
- Kim Ji-eun as Oh Min-jeong (Ep. 10, 12)
- Park Se-hyun as Kim Hye-Jin
- Yang Dae-hyuk as Kang Sun-woo
- Bae Seung-ik as Hong Nam-Pyo

== Production ==
The first script reading took place in January 2019 at KBS Broadcasting Station in Yeouido, South Korea.

== Original soundtrack ==
Doctor Prisoner OST

Soundtrack album by Various artists
- Recorded: 2019
- Genre: Soundtrack
- Languages: Korean; English
- Labels: Best Korea, 935 Entertainment, Donuts MusicN

=== Part 1 ===
Released on March 27, 2019
No.	Title	Lyrics	Music	Artist	Length
1.	"Fearless"	Innovator	SlyBerry; Hickee	Woo Hye-mi; Innovator	3:29
2.	"Fearless" (Inst.)		SlyBerry; Hickee		3:29
Total length:					6:58

=== Part 2 ===
Released on April 3, 2019
No.	Title	Lyrics	Music	Artist	Length
1.	"Eyes"	Nuvocity1 (Hong Joo-hee); Nuvocity2 (Kim Young-bin)	Nuvocity1 (Hong Joo-hee); Nuvocity2 (Kim Young-bin)	Hoody	3:26
2.	"Eyes" (Inst.)		Nuvocity1 (Hong Joo-hee); Nuvocity2 (Kim Young-bin)		3:26
Total length:					6:52

=== Part 3 ===
Released on April 10, 2019
No.	Title	Lyrics	Music	Artist	Length
1.	"Pass Away"	My Neighbour Bachelor	Microwave	Fil	3:16
2.	"Pass Away" (Inst.)		Microwave		3:16
Total length:					6:32

=== Part 4 ===
Released on April 18, 2019
No.	Title	Lyrics	Music	Artist	Length
1.	"Melting The Sun" (태양에 녹여)	Park Se-joon; Han Joon	Choi Han-sol; Han Kyung-soo	Lee Soo (MC The Max)	4:01
2.	"Melting The Sun" (Inst.)		Choi Han-sol; Han Kyung-soo		4:01
Total length:					8:02

== Viewership ==
- In this table, the blue numbers represent the lowest ratings and the red numbers represent the highest ratings.
- N/A denotes that the rating is not known.

Ep.	Original broadcast date	Average audience share		
Ep.	Original broadcast date	AGB Nielsen		TNmS
Ep.	Original broadcast date	Nationwide	Seoul	Nationwide
1	March 20, 2019	8.4% (8th)	8.6% (6th)	9.0%
2	March 20, 2019	9.8% (6th)	10.2% (5th)	10.1%
3	March 21, 2019	12.2% (5th)	12.8% (4th)	10.8%
4	March 21, 2019	14.1% (3rd)	15.0% (2nd)	12.7%
5	March 27, 2019	12.1% (5th)	12.2% (4th)	11.3%
6	March 27, 2019	13.9% (3rd)	14.2% (2nd)	13.1%
7	March 28, 2019	13.0% (4th)	14.0% (4th)	11.8%
8	March 28, 2019	14.5% (3rd)	15.6% (2nd)	13.1%
9	April 3, 2019	13.2% (4th)	13.5% (4th)	12.0%
10	April 3, 2019	15.4% (2nd)	15.9% (2nd)	12.8%
11	April 4, 2019	13.3% (4th)	15.0% (3rd)	11.5%
12	April 4, 2019	14.6% (3rd)	16.0% (2nd)	13.0%
13	April 10, 2019	12.7% (4th)	13.3% (3rd)	12.0%
14	April 10, 2019	15.2% (3rd)	15.9% (2nd)	13.3%
15	April 11, 2019	12.5% (4th)	13.6% (3rd)	—N/a
16	April 11, 2019	14.7% (2nd)	16.2% (2nd)	—N/a
17	April 17, 2019	12.4% (4th)	12.9% (3rd)	12.4%
18	April 17, 2019	14.5% (3rd)	14.7% (2nd)	13.6%
19	April 18, 2019	12.3% (4th)	13.5% (3rd)	11.8%
20	April 18, 2019	14.7% (2nd)	16.2% (2nd)	12.6%
21	April 24, 2019	12.6% (4th)	13.2% (3rd)	11.8%
22	April 24, 2019	14.6% (3rd)	15.4% (2nd)	13.1%
23	April 25, 2019	11.5% (4th)	13.2% (4th)	10.9%
24	April 25, 2019	13.4% (3rd)	15.0% (3rd)	12.5%
25	May 1, 2019	12.3% (4th)	12.9% (2nd)	11.7%
26	May 1, 2019	13.6% (3rd)	14.5% (1st)	12.5%
27	May 8, 2019	11.9% (4th)	13.2% (2nd)	11.0%
28	May 8, 2019	14.5% (1st)	16.0% (1st)	12.6%
29	May 9, 2019	12.3% (3rd)	13.7% (2nd)	11.0%
30	May 9, 2019	14.2% (1st)	15.6% (1st)	12.8%
31	May 15, 2019	13.2% (4th)	14.7% (2nd)	12.2%
32	May 15, 2019	15.8% (1st)	17.2% (1st)	13.9%
Average		13.23%	14.18%	— (Note: Due to some ratings not recorded, the exact average rating is unknown.)
Special	May 2, 2019	6.0% (14th)	6.2% (12th)	7.0%
Special	May 2, 2019	6.8% (9th)	7.2% (6th)	6.6%
Special	May 16, 2019	5.1% (18th)	5.7% (11th)	4.7%
Special	May 16, 2019	5.2% (16th)	5.7% (11th)	4.8%

== Awards and nominations ==
Year	Award	Category	Recipient	Result	Ref.
2019	14th Seoul International Drama Awards	Outstanding Korean Drama	Doctor Prisoner	Won	
2019	12th Korea Drama Awards	Best Drama	Doctor Prisoner	Nominated	
2019	12th Korea Drama Awards	Best Screenplay	Park Kye-ok	Nominated	
2019	12th Korea Drama Awards	Best New Actress	Kwon Nara	Won	
2019	KBS Drama Awards	Top Excellence Award, Actor	Namkoong Min	Nominated	
2019	KBS Drama Awards	Excellence Award, Actor in a Miniseries	Namkoong Min	Nominated	
2019	KBS Drama Awards	Excellence Award, Actor in a Miniseries	Choi Won-young	Won	
2019	KBS Drama Awards	Excellence Award, Actress in a Miniseries	Kwon Nara	Nominated	
2019	KBS Drama Awards	Best Supporting Actor	Kim Byung-chul	Won	
2019	KBS Drama Awards	Best Supporting Actor	Jang Hyun-sung	Nominated	
2019	KBS Drama Awards	Best Supporting Actress	Kim Jung-nan	Won	
2019	KBS Drama Awards	Best New Actor	Park Eun-seok	Nominated	
2019	KBS Drama Awards	Best New Actress	Kwon Nara	Won	
2019	KBS Drama Awards	Netizen Award, Actor	Namkoong Min	Nominated	
2019	KBS Drama Awards	Netizen Award, Actor	Kim Byung-chul	Nominated	
2019	KBS Drama Awards	Netizen Award, Actor	Choi Won-young	Nominated	
2019	KBS Drama Awards	Netizen Award, Actress	Kwon Nara	Nominated	
2019	KBS Drama Awards	Best Couple Award	Jang Hyun-sung and Kim Jung-nan	Won	
