= Mystery of Venus =

EP by Hello Venus
- Released: January 11, 2017
- Genre: Swing; R&B; Hip hop
- Length: 14:32
- Language: Korean
- Label: Fantagio Music; Interpark
- Producer: Simon Janlöv; Ylva Dimberg; Lisa Desmond; Maria Marcus; Devine Channel; Amanda Moseley; Nikki Paige

Hello Venus chronology
| I'm Ill (2015) | Mystery of Venus (2017) |

Singles from Mystery of Venus
- 1. "Glow" Released: May 10, 2016; 2. "Paradise" Released: July 18, 2016; 3. "Runway" Released: November 1, 2016; 4. "Mysterious" Released: January 11, 2017

Music video
- "Mysterious" on YouTube

Mystery of Venus is the sixth extended play by South Korean girl group Hello Venus. It was released on January 11, 2017, by Fantagio Music and distributed by Interpark. The EP consists of four songs, including their previous collaboration with producing and writing team, Devine Channel, with the addition of a new song, "Mysterious", the title track from the EP. To promote the EP, Hello Venus performed "Mysterious" on South Korean music programs, including Music Bank and Inkigayo. A music video for the title track was also released on January 11. This marks their last release before their disbandment in 2019.

The album was a commercial success entering at number 12 on the Gaon Album Chart

== Background and release ==
On December 14, 2016, it was officially announced by Fantagio, that the group will be making a comeback after a year and six months, in the second week of January 2017, also revealing that was going to be a mini-album. It was also revealed that the recording sessions and the album jacket shoot were finished. Later that month, it was revealed that the new mini-album release date will be on January 11, 2017 and that actor and 5urprise-member Seo Kang Joon will participate in the music video for their title track. On December 30, 2016 it was revealed that the mini-album will be called Mystery of Venus through a teaser image.

On January 1, 2017, a mash-up teaser was released, showing the group dance practice and recording sessions with mash-up of the songs from the upcoming mini-album. They also release another teaser image, mixing all the girls in a single picture. On the same, the track list was also revealed.

The mini-album was released on January 11, 2017 through several music sites in South Korea, such as Melon and on iTunes for the global market.

== Music video ==
On January 4, 2017, the first music video teaser was released, showing the group in a white background and dressed in shiny jackets of different colors.

The music video was released on January 11, 2017 with the participation of 5urprise's Seo Kangjoon and Astro's Cha Eunwoo.

== Promotion ==
To promote the EP, Hello Venus performed "Mysterious" on several South Korean music programs. They had their first comeback stage on Mnet's M Countdown on January 12, 2017, followed by KBS's Music Bank on January 13, MBC's Show! Music Core on January 14 and SBS's Inkigayo on January 15.

== Commercial performance ==
Mystery of Venus debuted and peaked at number 12 on the Gaon Album Chart on the chart issue dated January 8–14, 2017.

The EP entered at number 36 on the chart, for the month of January 2017, with 3,021 physical copies sold.

== Track listing ==
Digital download
| No. | Title | Lyrics | Music | Arrangement | Length |
|---|---|---|---|---|---|
| 1. | "Mysterious" | Kim Ina | Simon Janlöv; Ylva Dimberg | Simon Janlöv | 3:22 |
| 2. | "Runway" | Seo Ji-eum | Lisa Desmond; Maria Marcus; Simon Janlöv | Simon Janlöv | 3:41 |
| 3. | "Glow" (빛이 내리면: bich-i naelimyeon) | Yorkie | Devine Channel; Amanda Moseley | Devine Channel | 3:59 |
| 4. | "Paradise" | Devine Channel; Ryu | Devine Channel; Nikki Paige | Devine Channel | 3:30 |
| Total length: | | | | | 14:32 |

== Charts ==
| Chart (2017) | Peak position |
|---|---|
| South Korean Albums (Gaon) | 12 |

== Release history ==
| Region | Date | Format | Distributor |
|---|---|---|---|
| South Korea | January 11, 2017 | CD, Digital download | Fantagio Music |
