= Royal Secret Agent =

2020 South Korean historical comedy TV series

- Promotional poster
- Hangul: 암행어사: 조선비밀수사단
- Hanja: 暗行御史: 朝鮮秘密搜查團
- Lit.: Secret Royal Inspector
- RR: Amhaengeosa: Joseon bimil susadan
- MR: Amhaengŏsa: Chosŏn pimil susadan
- Genre: Historical; Comedy drama; Detective
- Created by: Kim Sang-hui; KBS Drama Division
- Written by: Kang Min-sun; Park Sung-hoon
- Directed by: Kim Jung-min
- Starring: Kim Myung-soo; Kwon Nara; Lee Yi-kyung; Lee Tae-hwan; Jo Soo-min
- Composer: Lee Ji-yong
- Country of origin: South Korea
- Original language: Korean
- No. of episodes: 16

Production
- Executive producer: Yoon Jae-hyuk
- Producers: Baek Seung-min; Kim Jong-sik; Kim Nam-hee
- Running time: 70 minutes
- Production company: IWill Media

Original release
- Network: KBS2
- Release: December 21, 2020 – February 9, 2021

Royal Secret Agent (Korean: 암행어사) is a South Korean historical comedy, detective television series. The series is directed by Kim Jung-min and stars Kim Myung-soo, Kwon Nara, Lee Tae-hwan, Lee Yi-kyung, and Jo Soo-min. Written by Kang Min-sun and Park Sung-hoon the series is about a government position of Joseon known as secret royal inspector, who monitors corrupt government officials while remaining undercover. It aired on KBS2 every Monday and Tuesday at 21:30 (KST) from December 21, 2020, to February 9, 2021.

== Synopsis ==
Set in the Joseon period, the series revolves around Sung Yi-gyum (Kim Myung-soo), a state examination top scorer who works in the administrative and research department of the government office. He is caught gambling and as punishment, he is reassigned to a new position as a secret royal inspector to investigate the corrupt practices of public officers. Yi-gyum carries out his new job with the help of Hong Da-in (Kwon Nara), a female inspector, and Park Chun-sam (Lee Yi-kyung), his talkative but affectionate servant.

== Cast ==
=== Main ===
==== The three musketeers ====
- Kim Myung-soo as Sung Yi-gyum, a secret royal inspector
- Kwon Na-ra as Hong Da-in/Honglang/Lee Young-sin, female police posing as a courtesan whose beauty is comparable to Hwang Jini. She becomes a member of Royal Secret Agent's entourage.
- Lee Yi-kyung as Park Chun-sam, Sung Yi-gyum's servant.

==== Around three musketeers ====
- Lee Tae-hwan as Sung Yi-beom, Sung Yi-gyum's half-brother, head of the band of vigilante
- Jo Soo-min as Kang Soon-ae, Sung Yi-gyum's ex-lover, daughter of a courtesan

=== Supporting ===
- Ahn Nae-sang as Jang Tae-seung, Chief Royal Secretary
- Son Byong-ho as Kim Byeong-geun, Chief State Councillor
- Kim Young-cheol
- Choi Jong-won as Kang In-chung, corrupt sheriff
- Ha Young as Kim Mi-ok
- Park Joo-hyung as Seo Yong
- Kim Kyung-sook
- Lee Min-woo
- Um Hyo-sup
- Chae Dong-hyun as Kim Man-hee, Kim Byeong-geun's first son
- Jong Ho as Man Deok
- Shin Ji-hoon as Choi Do-kwan
- Jo Deok-hee as Jung Moon-ho
- Yang Byung-yeol as Civil servant Kim

== Production ==
By July 2020, the main cast of the series with Lee Tae-hwan, Kim Myung-soo, Kwon Nara and Lee Yi-kyung was finalized. The broadcast was initially scheduled to be premiered on November 2, 2020, but due to re-proliferation of COVID-19, the production was delayed. In October, group script reading was held. The still photos in the period costume, from the set of series were released by KBS as the filming progressed.

== Original soundtrack ==
Royal Secret Agent OST

Soundtrack album by Various artists
- Released: 2021
- Genre: Soundtrack
- Languages: Korean; English
- Labels: Ogam Entertainment; Mark0809

=== Part 1 ===
Released on January 11, 2021
No.	Title	Lyrics	Music	Artist	Length
1.	"I'll Find You"	Yoon Il-sang	Yoon Il-sang	N.Flying	4:31
2.	"I'll Find You" (Inst.)		Yoon Il-sang		4:31
Total length:					9:02

=== Part 2 ===
Released on January 29, 2021
No.	Title	Lyrics	Music	Artist	Length
1.	"My Love"	Jo Jo Ho	Jo Jo Ho	Lee Sun	3:47
2.	"My Love" (Inst.)		Jo Jo Ho		3:47
Total length:					7:34

=== Part 3 ===
Released on February 2, 2021
No.	Title	Lyrics	Music	Artist	Length
1.	"Even if it accidentally passes"	Bean	Bean	ALICE (Song Joo-hee)	3:41
2.	"Even if it accidentally passes" (Inst.)		Bean		3:41
Total length:					7:22

== Episodes ==
No.	Title	Directed by	Written by	Original release date	South Korea viewers (millions)
1	"Episode 1"	Kim Jung-min	Kang Min-sun & Park Sung-hoon	December 21, 2020	N/A (<0.994)
A Secret Royal Inspector is killed by corrupt officials' men. The courtiers appeal to king to abolish the royal inspector system, but the king refuses. Hong Da-in (Kwon Nara), a courtesan spies on officials and report to Jang Tae- seung, Chief Secretary. Sung Yi-gyum (Kim Myung-soo) an assistant advisor is caught gambling and as punishment, he is appointed as Secret Royal Inspector. Hong Da-in's cover is blown so she is also sent with Yi-gyum to help. Yi-gyum's servant, Park Chun-sam (Lee Yi-kyung) is part of the Secret Royal Inspector's entourage.
2	"Episode 2"	Kim Jung-min	Kang Min-sun & Park Sung-hoon	December 22, 2020	0.994
3	"Episode 3"	Kim Jung-min	Kang Min-sun & Park Sung-hoon	December 28, 2020	N/A (<1.023)
4	"Episode 4"	Kim Jung-min	Kang Min-sun & Park Sung-hoon	December 29, 2020	1.095
5	"Episode 5"	Kim Jung-min	Kang Min-sun & Park Sung-hoon	January 4, 2021	1.058
6	"Episode 6"	Kim Jung-min	Kang Min-sun & Park Sung-hoon	January 5, 2021	1.212
7	"Episode 7"	Kim Jung-min	Kang Min-sun & Park Sung-hoon	January 11, 2021	1.637
8	"Episode 8"	Kim Jung-min	Kang Min-sun & Park Sung-hoon	January 12, 2021	1.725
9	"Episode 9"	Kim Jung-min	Kang Min-sun & Park Sung-hoon	January 18, 2021	1.792
10	"Episode 10"	Kim Jung-min	Kang Min-sun & Park Sung-hoon	January 19, 2021	1.864
11	"Episode 11"	Kim Jung-min	Kang Min-sun & Park Sung-hoon	January 25, 2021	1.899
12	"Episode 12"	Kim Jung-min	Kang Min-sun & Park Sung-hoon	January 26, 2021	2.152
13	"Episode 13"	Kim Jung-min	Kang Min-sun & Park Sung-hoon	February 1, 2021	2.321
14	"Episode 14"	Kim Jung-min	Kang Min-sun & Park Sung-hoon	February 2, 2021	2.178
15	"Episode 15"	Kim Jung-min	Kang Min-sun & Park Sung-hoon	February 8, 2021	2.039
16	"Episode 16"	Kim Jung-min	Kang Min-sun & Park Sung-hoon	February 9, 2021	2.323

== Viewership ==
As per the audience rating of AGB Nielsen Media Research, the second part of the final episode, recorded 14% average TV viewership ratings. This is the highest record for its ratings.

Royal Secret Agent : South Korea viewers per episode (millions)

Season	Episode number																Average
Season	1	2	3	4	5	6	7	8	9	10	11	12	13	14	15	16	Average
1	N/A	0.994	N/A	1.095	1.058	1.212	1.637	1.725	1.792	1.864	1.899	2.152	2.321	2.178	2.039	2.323	N/A

Source: Audience measurement performed nationwide by Nielsen Korea.

Average TV viewership ratings
Ep.	Part	Original broadcast date	Average audience share	
Ep.	Part	Original broadcast date	Nielsen Korea	
Ep.	Part	Original broadcast date	Nationwide	Seoul
1	1	December 21, 2020	5.0% (NR)	—N/a
1	2	December 21, 2020	5.0% (NR)	—N/a
2	1	December 22, 2020	5.5% (NR)	—N/a
2	2	December 22, 2020	5.8% (19th)	—N/a
3	1	December 28, 2020	5.3% (NR)	—N/a
3	2	December 28, 2020	5.2% (NR)	—N/a
4	1	December 29, 2020	5.2% (NR)	—N/a
4	2	December 29, 2020	6.1% (18th)	5.7% (20th)
5	1	January 4, 2021	5.7% (NR)	—N/a
5	2	January 4, 2021	5.0% (NR)	—N/a
6	1	January 5, 2021	4.9% (NR)	—N/a
6	2	January 5, 2021	6.5% (15th)	—N/a
7	1	January 11, 2021	6.0% (17th)	6.1% (17th)
7	2	January 11, 2021	8.7% (7th)	8.6% (5th)
8	1	January 12, 2021	6.4% (16th)	—N/a
8	2	January 12, 2021	9.7% (7th)	9.0% (8th)
9	1	January 18, 2021	5.8% (19th)	—N/a
9	2	January 18, 2021	9.7% (6th)	8.9% (7th)
10	1	January 19, 2021	7.7% (11th)	7.2% (12th)
10	2	January 19, 2021	11.6% (3rd)	11.2% (4th)
11	1	January 25, 2021	8.4% (8th)	8.0% (11th)
11	2	January 25, 2021	10.6% (4th)	10.0% (4th)
12	1	January 26, 2021	8.6% (8th)	8.0% (9th)
12	2	January 26, 2021	12.0% (4th)	11.2% (4th)
13	1	February 1, 2021	9.7% (6th)	8.7% (6th)
13	2	February 1, 2021	13.6% (3rd)	12.6% (3rd)
14	1	February 2, 2021	8.8% (6th)	7.9% (7th)
14	2	February 2, 2021	12.3% (3rd)	11.1% (3rd)
15	1	February 8, 2021	8.8% (8th)	7.9% (10th)
15	2	February 8, 2021	12.0% (4th)	10.7% (4th)
16	1	February 9, 2021	10.2% (7th)	9.8% (5th)
16	2	February 9, 2021	14.0% (3rd)	13.2% (3rd)
Average			8.1%	— (Note: Due to some ratings not recorded, the exact average rating is unknown.)
In the table above, the blue numbers represent the lowest ratings and the red numbers represent the highest ratings.; NR denotes that the series did not rank in the top 20 daily programs on that date.; N/A denotes that the rating is not known.

== International broadcast ==
The series is available same time as Korea, as an iQIYI Original and exclusively on iQIYI globally (except China and Korea) with multi-languages subtitles. It is also available non-exclusively on iQIYI in South Korea.

== Awards and nominations ==
Year	Award	Category	Recipient	Result	Ref.
2021	KBS Drama Awards	Top Excellence Award, Actor	Kim Myung-soo	Nominated	
2021	KBS Drama Awards	Excellence Award, Actor in a Miniseries	Kim Myung-soo	Nominated	
2021	KBS Drama Awards	Excellence Award, Actress in a Miniseries	Kwon Nara	Won	
2021	KBS Drama Awards	Best Supporting Actor	Lee Yi-kyung	Won	
