= Wiggle Wiggle (Hello Venus song) =

2015 song by Hello Venus

Single by Hello Venus
- Released: January 5, 2015
- Recorded: 2014
- Length: 3:23
- Label: Fantagio Music, NHN Entertainment
- Songwriters: Brave Brothers, Galactika
- Producer: Brave Brothers

Hello Venus singles chronology
"Sticky Sticky" (2014)	"Wiggle Wiggle" (2015)	"I'm Ill" (2015)

"Wiggle Wiggle" (Korean: 위글위글) is a Korean song recorded by South Korean girl group Hello Venus served as their fifth digital single. The song was released on January 5, 2015 by Fantagio Music. The lyrics were written by Brave Brothers and Galactika and the music was composed by Brave Brothers.

== Background and release ==
On December 23, 2014, it was revealed by Fantagio that the group will be making a comeback in early 2015 with a new song called "Wiggle Wiggle", releasing a group teaser image and a music video teaser rated 18+. On December 29, the cover for the single was released.

On January 5, 2015, Fantagio Music released the song digitally through music portals such as MelOn in South Korea and on iTunes, for the global market. On January 8, the music video for the song was released and was rated 19+ seen as provocative.

== Commercial performance ==
The song entered and peaked at number 66 on the Gaon Digital Chart on the chart issue dated January 4–10, 2015 with 26,014 download sold. The song dropped from the chart the following week.

== Charts ==
=== Single charts ===
Country	Chart (2015)	Peak position
South Korea	Gaon Digital Chart	66
