= What Are You Doing Today? =

EP by Hello Venus
- Released: December 12, 2012
- Genre: K-pop; dance-pop
- Length: 17:23
- Label: Tricell Media; NHN Entertainment

Hello Venus chronology
Venus (2012)	What Are You Doing Today? (2012)	Would You Stay For Tea? (2013)

Singles from What Are You Doing Today?
- 1. "What Are You Doing Today?" Released: December 12, 2012; 2. "Romantic Love" Released: December 12, 2012

What Are You Doing Today? (Hangul: 오늘 뭐해?; RR: oneul mwohae?) is the second extended play by South Korean girl group Hello Venus. It was released on December 12, 2012, by Tricell Media and distributed by NHN Entertainment.

== Release ==
The EP was digitally released on December 12, 2012, through several music portals, including MelOn in South Korea, and iTunes for the global market.

== Track listing ==
Digital download

No.	Title	Lyrics	Music	Arrangement	Length
1.	"What Are You Doing Today?" (오늘 뭐해?; oneul mwohae?)	Kimina	Cho Youngsoo; Kim Tae-hyun	Cho Youngsoo; Kim Tae-hyun	3:22
2.	"Romantic Love"	Kim Heesun	Seo Jaeha	Seo Jaeha	3:03
3.	"First Love"	Cho Youngsoo; Yujin	Cho Youngsoo; Yujin	Cho Youngsoo; Yujin	3:46
4.	"Same" (똑같아; ttoggat-a)	Park Yongin (Urban Zakapa); PEAKBOY	Park Yongin (Urban Zakapa); PEAKBOY	Park Yongin (Urban Zakapa); PEAKBOY	3:42
5.	"Winter Fantasy"	Ryu Minmin	Ryu Minmin	Fraktal	3:30
Total length:					17:23
