= Cunning Single Lady =

- Promotional poster for Cunning Single Lady
- Also known as: Sly and Single Again; Devious Divorcee
- Genre: Romance; Comedy; Drama
- Written by: Lee Ha-na; Choi Soo-young
- Directed by: Go Dong-sun; Jung Dae-yoon
- Starring: Lee Min-jung; Joo Sang-wook
- Country of origin: South Korea
- Original language: Korean
- No. of episodes: 16

Production
- Executive producers: Go Dong-sun; Na Byung-joon; Shin In-soo
- Producers: Kim Ho-ryong; So Jae-hyun
- Running time: 55 minutes
- Production companies: Fantagio; IOK Media

Original release
- Network: MBC TV
- Release: February 27 – April 24, 2014

Cunning Single Lady (Korean: 앙큼한 돌싱녀; RR: Angkeumhan dolsingnyeo; lit. 'Devious Woman Who's Single Again') is a 2014 South Korean romantic comedy television series starring Lee Min-jung and Joo Sang-wook as a divorced couple who rekindles their romance. It aired on MBC TV from February 27 to April 24, 2014 on Wednesdays and Thursdays at 21:55 for 16 episodes.

== Plot ==
Na Ae-ra grew up believing she was born to be only pretty and not smart. While working at her family's restaurant, she falls in love with Cha Jung-woo, a geeky engineering graduate student preparing to enter civil service. Na Ae-ra wants to become a housewife, and after Jung-woo promises that she will be, they get married. During their 100th day wedding celebration, Jung-woo announces that he has quit his job because he has an idea for a business. Jung-woo's businesses keep failing and Ae-ra struggles to keep them afloat by working multiple jobs. After secretly suffering a miscarriage from the stress of being the sole breadwinner and living in poverty, Ae-ra divorces Jung-woo after four years of marriage. Three years after the divorce, Ae-ra discovers that Jung-woo has become fabulously successful and wealthy, while she is still paying debts that accrued during their marriage. The fun begins when Ae-ra schemes for revenge, with Jung-woo believing that Ae-ra wants him back because he has become wealthy.

== Cast ==
=== Main characters ===
- Lee Min-jung as Na Ae-ra

Beautiful but flighty, Ae-ra initially cares more about honing her looks over her life skills. Upon marriage to Jung-woo, she dreams of becoming a housewife but finds herself shouldering the sole burden of their financial needs for four years, until frustration and exhaustion drives her to divorce him. But after learning of his success, she schemes to ostensibly win back her ex-husband by becoming an intern at his company, though what she really wants from him is a belated apology and a "thank you".

- Joo Sang-wook as Cha Jung-woo

Despite being an engineering genius, he was initially studying to become a civil servant when he meets and marries Ae-ra. To her shock, Jung-woo suddenly announces that he's quitting to become a software developer instead. Years of his business failures lead to their divorce. Jung-woo eventually creates DonTalk, a WhatsApp-like text-over-data app that becomes Korea's No.1 social networking application. Thus Jung-woo transforms from a geeky loser into the self-made, successful president of D&T Software Ventures, a venture capital firm.

- Kim Gyu-ri as Gook Yeo-jin

Smart, elegant, and capable, Yeo-jin possesses a keen insight and determination that can be intimidating, particularly given that she was born with the disposition of a boss. She is an heiress, being the daughter of the chairman of D&T Software Ventures, where she works as a director. She nurses painful scars from a past love, but falls for her business partner Jung-woo because of his warm personality, becoming Ae-ra's rival for his heart.

- Seo Kang-joon as Gook Seung-hyun

Yeo-jin's younger brother, who was once tutored by Jung-woo when he was in high school. Good-looking, rich, and caring, Seung-hyun is seemingly a perfect guy. Upon his return to Korea from overseas, he gets hired at DonTalk despite his resistance to working a desk job at his father's company; but to avoid preferential treatment, he hides his real identity. Among his fellow interns is Ae-ra, and he becomes attracted to her, notwithstanding their eight-year age difference.

=== Supporting characters ===
- Kim Myung-soo as Gil Yo-han

Yo-han was the part-time clerk at the PC bang where Jung-woo practically lived when he was broke, and when he hits it big, he takes the kid along and hires him as his personal secretary. The two have a devoted friendship, particularly since Yo-han was by Jung-woo's side while he was suffering through his divorce.

- Hwang Bo-ra as Kang Min-young

Ae-ra's best friend.

- Lee Byung-joon as Oh Byung-joon

Managing director, and Chairman Gook's right-hand man.

- Choi Cheol-ho as Kim Jung-won

Manager of the mobile shopping team.

- Im Ji-eun as Wang Ji-hyun

Team leader of the mobile shopping team.

- Lee Hwa-kyum (Note: Credited as Lee Yoo-young.) as Pi Song-hee

Fresh out of university, Song-hee is a new employee at D&T Software Ventures. She pretends to be quiet most of the time but is actually a seductress.

- Kim Jae-hwa as Oh Bang-soon

Ae-ra's frenemy.

- Lee Jung-gil as Gook Yong-geol

Yeo-jin and Seung-hyun's father. The chairman of D&T Software Ventures.

- Kim Yong-hee as Na Soo-cheol

Ae-ra's troublemaker older brother. He escapes to Seoul after a failed business in Vietnam. Soo-cheol only manages to survive with the help of his sister, and he accepts the alimony money from Jung-woo that Ae-ra had already rejected.

- Kim Eung-soo as Na Gab-soo

Ae-ra's father.

- Kwon Ki-sun as Jang Sook-ja

Ae-ra's mother.

- Kim Ye-ryeong as Lee Eun-hwa

Yeo-jin and Seung-hyun's mother.

- Kim Ho-young as Jung-woo's father
- Byun Eun-young as Jung-woo's mother
- --- as Cha Jung-sook

Jung-woo's older sister.

- --- as Cha Jung-ran

Jung-woo's younger sister.

- Choi Joo-hee as Yeo-jin's secretary
- Kim Bup-rae

=== Cameo appearances ===
- In Gyo-jin as man no. 1
- Lee Jung-eun as salon director
- Wang Bit-na as Yeo-jin's college roommate who went on a blind date with Jung-woo (ep. 2)
- Oh Na-mi as S-line lady
- Kim Sung-kyun as head of IT security (ep. 3)
- Ricky Kim as Yeo-jin's first love who died in a car accident soon after they got married (ep. 5)
- Choi Eun-kyung as matchmaking MC
- Yeom Dong-heon as middle-aged man
- Yang Hee-kyung as restaurant ajumma
- Lee Jong-soo as Robert Kim
- Alice as booking lady (ep. 10)
- Kwon Nara as booking lady (ep. 10)
- Kim Da-hyun as Kim Chang-soo, CEO of Shilla Hotel (ep. 12-13)
- Lee Han-wi as doctor
- Choi Kyu-hwan as Kim Chang-gyu

== Production ==
The screenplay won the Encouragement prize at MBC's 2012 Script Contest (serial section).

== Ratings ==
In the table below, the blue numbers represent the lowest ratings and the red numbers represent the highest ratings. The final two episodes were not aired as originally scheduled due to media coverage on the sinking of the MV Sewol.

Episode #	Original broadcast date	Average audience share			
Episode #	Original broadcast date	TNmS Ratings		AGB Nielsen	
Episode #	Original broadcast date	Nationwide	Seoul National Capital Area	Nationwide	Seoul National Capital Area
1	February 27, 2014	4.1%	4.9%	5.4%	6.4%
2	February 28, 2014	5.7%	7.0%	6.4%	7.4%
3	March 5, 2014	8.1%	10.8%	10.3%	11.9%
4	March 6, 2014	7.8%	10.1%	8.9%	9.6%
5	March 12, 2014	8.0%	9.9%	9.2%	10.4%
6	March 13, 2014	7.9%	10.0%	8.5%	9.4%
7	March 19, 2014	8.1%	9.9%	8.3%	8.9%
8	March 20, 2014	7.8%	9.5%	8.7%	9.7%
9	March 26, 2014	8.5%	10.1%	8.7%	9.9%
10	March 27, 2014	7.9%	9.9%	8.5%	9.1%
11	April 2, 2014	7.7%	9.6%	7.9%	8.9%
12	April 3, 2014	8.7%	11.2%	8.8%	10.3%
13	April 9, 2014	9.2%	11.7%	8.2%	9.0%
14	April 10, 2014	9.1%	11.2%	9.1%	10.5%
15	April 23, 2014	7.8%	10.3%	9.3%	10.8%
16	April 24, 2014	7.5%	9.6%	9.2%	10.7%
Average		7.7%	9.7%	8.5%	9.6%

== Awards and nominations ==
Year	Award	Category	Recipient	Result
2014	7th Korea Drama Awards	Best New Actor	Seo Kang-joon	Won
2014	16th Seoul International Youth Film Festival	Best Young Actor	Seo Kang-joon	Nominated
2014	MBC Drama Awards	Top Excellence Award, Actress in a Miniseries	Lee Min-jung	Nominated
2014	MBC Drama Awards	Excellence Award, Actor in a Miniseries	Joo Sang-wook	Nominated
2014	MBC Drama Awards	Best New Actor	Seo Kang-joon	Nominated
2014	MBC Drama Awards	Popularity Award, Actor	Joo Sang-wook	Nominated

== Original soundtrack ==
Cunning Single Lady: Original Sound Track

Soundtrack album by Various Artists
- Released: April 16, 2014
- Genres: Pop, K-pop, soundtrack, R&B
- Labels: LOEN Entertainment; L100004890
- Producers: The Groove Entertainment; Bridge Music

No.	Title	Artist	Length
1.	"그냥 사랑인 거죠" (It's Just Love)	Hello Venus
2.	"정말 사랑합니다" (I Really Love You)	Yoo Sung-eun and GilguBongu
3.	"모르겠죠" (Don't Know)	Oh Yoo-joon
4.	"Beautiful Girl"	1sagain and JUST
5.	"For the First Time"	Big Baby Driver
6.	"Alone Again"	Big Baby Driver
7.	"앙큼한 상상" (Cunning Thoughts)	Sunny Hill
8.	"케미" (Mirror Mirror)	Dohee and J.Min of Tiny-G
9.	"어떡하나요" (What Do I Do?)	Yoo Seung-woo
10.	"앙큼한 돌싱녀" (Cunning Single Lady)	Various Artists
11.	"Queen of Romance"	Various Artists
12.	"짧은 이별" (Short Farewell)	Various Artists
13.	"Fuzzbuzz"	Various Artists
14.	"The Men's Qualification"	Various Artists
15.	"Tears of Princess"	Various Artists
16.	"여왕의 귀환" (Return of the Queen)	Various Artists
17.	"Lonely Lady"	Various Artists
18.	"Craziness Party"	Various Artists
