= Yoo Ara =

South Korean singer and actress (born 1992)

- 유아라
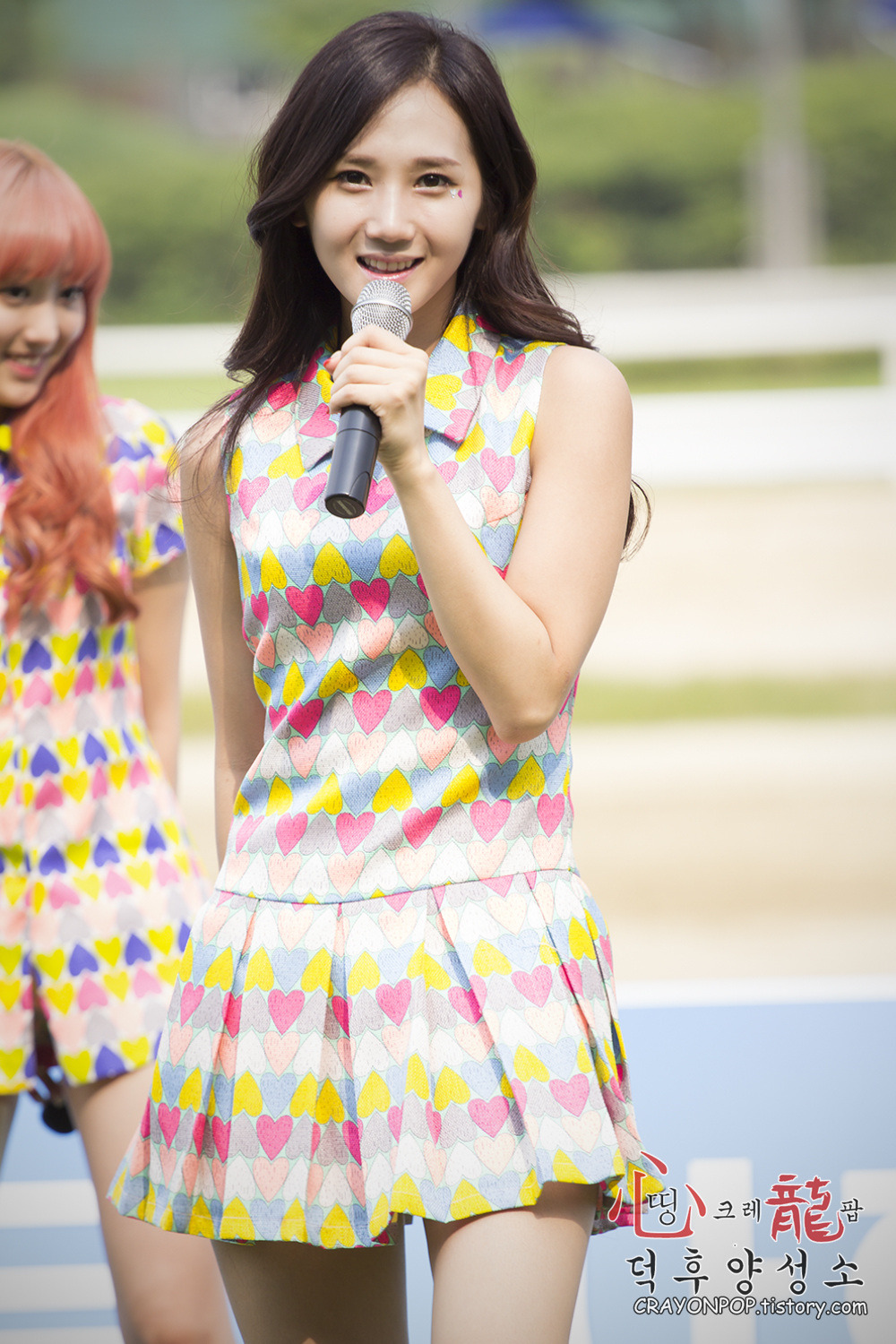
- Yoo in June 2013
- Born: Yoo Ah-ra; September 26, 1992 (age 34); Pyeongtaek, South Korea
- Education: Dongduk Women's University
- Occupations: Singer; musical actress
- Years active: 2010–2015
- Agent: Urban Works Entertainment
- Musical career
- Genre: K-pop
- Instrument: Vocals
- Labels: Pledis Entertainment; Fantagio
- Formerly of: Hello Venus; Happy Pledis

Korean name
- Hangul: 유아라
- Hanja: 柳娥羅
- RR: Yu Ara
- MR: Yu Ara

Yoo Ara (Korean: 유아라; born September 26, 1992) is a South Korean former singer and actress, known for her work as a former member of the South Korean girl group Hello Venus.

== Career ==
=== Pre-debut ===
Yoo was part of a training program, called Pre-School Girls, that would eventually become a member of sister group After School, but was chosen to be the leader of Hello Venus instead. She sang the chorus for the 1st Happy Pledis single, "Love Love Love". She also sang and appeared in the music video "Love Letter".

Yoo, along with fellow Pledis trainee Kyung Min were the final two candidates to me2day Search for After School's 9th Member in 2010. Yoo, along with Hello Venus members, Yoonjo were originally in the line-up for After School however, current After School member E-Young was chosen instead.

=== 2012: Debut with HelloVenus ===
Yoo debuted on May 9, 2012, actively promoting Hello Venus's debut release, the mini-album Venus. Venus features four tracks in all, with "Venus" serving as the promotional track.

Promotions for "Venus" began on May 10, 2012, on M! Countdown, without Yoonjo.

On July 4, 2012, together with the group, they released "Like a Wave", off the digital repackage Like a Wave.

=== 2014: Departure from Hello Venus and Pledis ===
Yoo was featured in label mate Seventeen's remix of the song "A Midsummer Night's Sweetness" by Raina and San E, the remix being released on July 27.

Four days later, an official statement was posted stating that Pledis and Fantagio had decided to end their collaboration project: Hello Venus. Yoo and Yoonjo (Pledis), would be leaving the group, and the rest would stay as a Fantagio act.

On November 21, Yoo uploaded a video to Instagram, showing her with a guitar case and a bag, walking out of a building. It has since been deleted. Later that day, Urban Works Entertainment uploaded a profile for Yoo on their website, showing that Yoo had departed from Pledis. Yoo's signing with Urban Works was formally announced on December 1.

=== 2015: Musical actress debut ===
On February 11, it was revealed that Yoo would be cast as the female lead in the Japanese musical remake of Moon Embracing the Sun. The musical will open its curtains at Theater BRAVA in Osaka on the 20th, as well as U-Port Hall in Tokyo in April.

On August 5, 2015, Urban Works announced that Yoo will be acting in The Alchemist as Yoo Jin-ah, Oh Young-ji's best friend and roommate, played by Kara's Youngji.

=== 2016: Departure from Urban Works ===
In 2016, Yoo departed from Urban Works after she decided to not renew her contract.

== Personal life ==
Yoo went to Seoul Music High School, the same school as SHINee's Jonghyun, Block B's Zico and Boyfriend's Jeongmin. She graduated on February 19, 2010, two years earlier than usual. On June 11, 2024, she revealed that she had been diagnosed with cancer and that she had undergone emergency surgery to remove the tumor.

== Discography ==
=== Collaborations ===
| Year | Title | Peak chart positions | Album |
| Year | Title | KOR | Album |
|---|---|---|---|
| 2010 | "Love Love Love" (After School) | — | Happy Pledis 1st Album |
| 2011 | "Love Letter" (Pledis Artist) | — | Happy Pledis 2012 |
| 2013 | "Pretty" (예뻐) (Nu'est) | — | Sleep Talking |
"—" denotes releases that did not chart or were not released in that region.

== Filmography ==
=== TV drama ===
| Year | Title | Role |
|---|---|---|
| 2012 | What is Mom | Shop maid |
| 2013 | After School: Lucky or Not | Cameo |
| 2014 | Golden Rainbow | Young Won's Secretary |
| 2015 | Super Daddy Yeol | Cameo |

=== TV show ===
| Year | Title | Notes |
|---|---|---|
| 2012 | Weekly Idol | |
| 2012 | Birth of Venus | |
| 2012 | Wonderboy | guest in ep. 10 with Boyfriend |
| 2012 | Joy's Hug | |
| 2012 | 1000 Song Challenge | with Nara |
| 2013 | MTV Diary: Hellovenus | |
| 2013 | Idol Star Athletics Championship | |
| 2013 | Weekly Idol | |
| 2013 | 1000 Song Challenge | |
| 2013 | Idol Gayo Stage | |
| 2013 | All the K-pop | with Nara |
| 2013/2014 | Perfect Singer VS | |

== Recognition ==
- 2010: Pledis's 2009 Audition Search for After School's 9th Member – with Kyung Min (Pledis trainee)
