= Hello Venus =

South Korean girl group

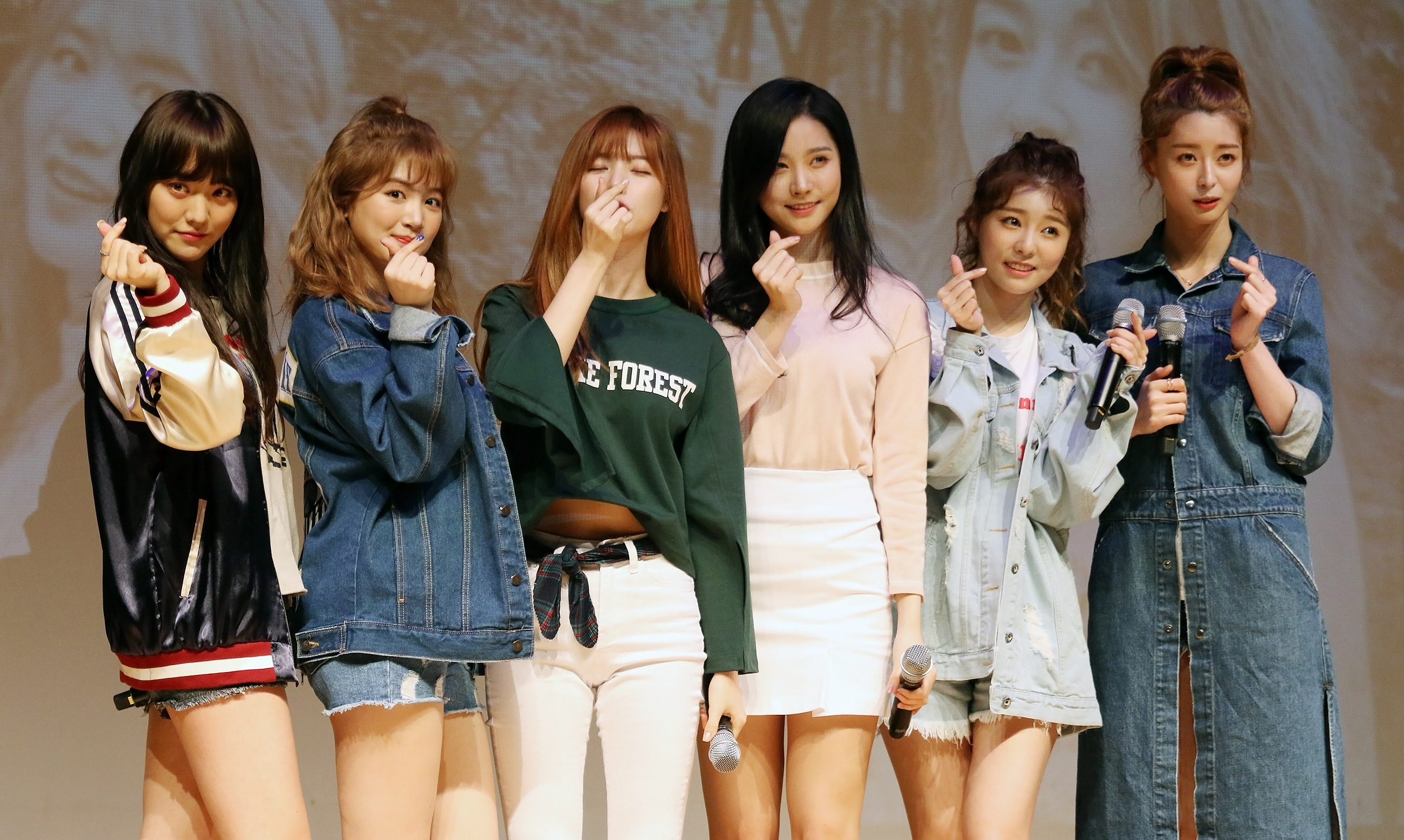
- Hello Venus in 2016; From left to right: Lime, Yeoreum, Alice, Yooyoung, Seoyoung, Nara

Background information
- Origin: Seoul, South Korea
- Genres: K-pop
- Years active: 2012–2019
- Labels: Fantagio; Pledis; Tricell Media
- Past members: Alice; Nara; Yooara; Yoonjo; Lime; Yooyoung; Seoyoung; Yeoreum

Hello Venus (Korean: 헬로비너스; often stylized as HELLOVENUS) was a South Korean girl group formed by Tricell Media (formerly a joint venture between Pledis Entertainment and Fantagio). The group originally consisted of: Alice, Nara, Lime, Yooara, Yoonjo and Yooyoung. They debuted with the lead single "Venus" from their debut extended play of the same name on 9 May 2012. In July 2014, Fantagio and Pledis ended their Tricell Media joint ventures. Yooara and Yoonjo remained under Pledis, with the other four members continuing their group activities under Fantagio. In October 2014, Fantagio introduced two new members: Seoyoung and Yeoreum. The group officially disbanded in 2019, after all the members' contracts expired. The group is most notable for songs such as: "Sticky Sticky", "Wiggle Wiggle" and "I'm Ill".

== History ==
=== Pre-debut activities ===
Pledis Entertainment collaborated with Fantagio Entertainment, an acting agency, for Hello Venus' showcase in April. Yoo Ara and Yoonjo were trainees of After School, both having performed on their first album Virgin and were originally intended to join the group. Yoo Ara, along with fellow Pledis trainees Kim Kyungmin and Nicole Yi, were the final three candidates to become After School's ninth member, but Noh Yi Young (now known as E-Young) was chosen instead. Lime was in the pre-debut line-up of a girl group called Viva Girls under Medialine Entertainment alongside Nine Muses member Gyeongree. However, the group disbanded, and the members left the company.

Lime was a rapper in Lee Jung's "들어봐 (Look At Me)" and Honey Family's "역전의 드라마 (Reversal of Drama)" under the name Haley.

The group was originally a seven-member line-up; consisting of the Alice, Nara, Yoo Ara, Nicole, Yoonjo, Lime, and Yooyoung. however, Nicole departed Pledis shortly before Hello Venus's debut.

=== 2012–2013: Debut with Venus, What Are You Doing Today? and Would You Stay for Tea? ===
Hello Venus first became known under the name Venus. On 17 April, Hello Venus was officially announced with a teaser image, along with the opening of an official website. The final group had six members, containing two members from Pledis: Yoo Ara and Yoonjo, and four members from Fantagio: Alice, Nara, Lime and Yooyoung. Hello Venus release their debut mini album, Venus on 9 May 2012, with a total of four tracks including the lead single of the same name.

Hello Venus continue to release new digital single, Like a Wave on 4 July 2012. The single was a part of re-release their debut mini album, Venus.

Hello Venus' second extended play What Are You Doing Today? was released on 12 December. The album contains five tracks, with the lead single of the same name.

Promotions for "What Are You Doing Today?" concluded on 27 January, however on 30 January, Tricell Media announced that the group would begin promoting their follow-up song, "Romantic Love" immediately, with the first performance on MBC Music's Show Champion the same day.

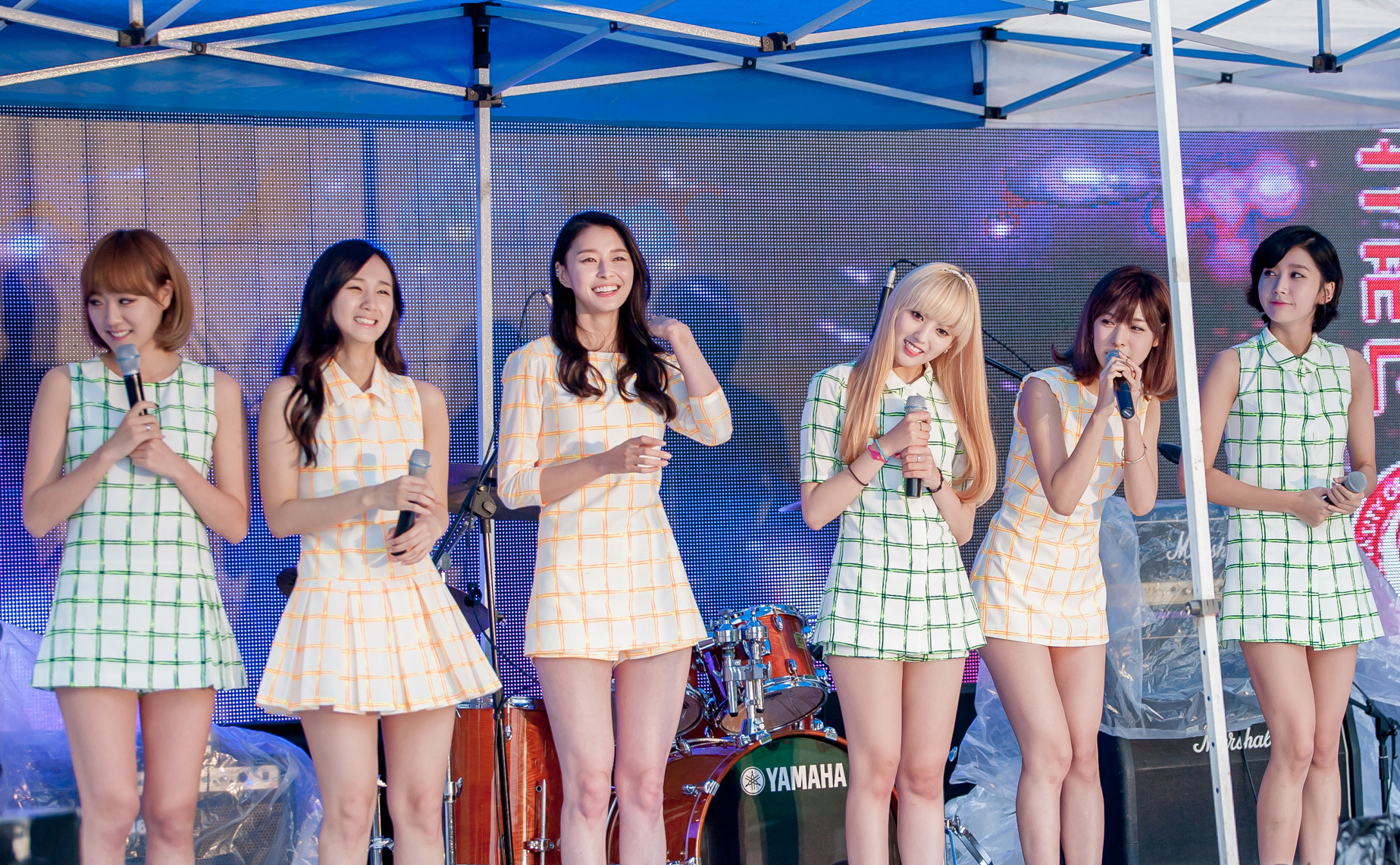
Hello Venus in 2013

Hello Venus released their third extended play Would You Stay for Tea? on 2 May 2013, with a total of four tracks including the lead single of the same name. The following day, Tricell Media announced that the group will hold their first solo concert at Sogang University's Mary Hall on 22 June.

=== 2014: Line-up changes and Sticky Sticky ===
It was announced on 31 July via Hello Venus' official Daum café that Pledis and Fantagio had decided to end the Hello Venus project. Alice, Nara, Lime, and Yooyoung would continue to promote as Hello Venus, while Yoo Ara and Yoonjo would return to Pledis, pursuing careers in acting and continue their careers in music. The remaining members would work on releasing a new album and would also be venturing into acting. Hello Venus was then managed solely by Fantagio.

On 16 September, the group's agency announced that they are scheduled to have a comeback sometime in the fall. The comeback was reported to be in collaboration with the Brave Brothers, as well as introducing a new member to the group. On 22 October, Fantagio introduced two new members: Seoyoung and Yeoreum, and announced that the group would be making their comeback with a single in the following month. A music video teaser for their upcoming single "Sticky Sticky" was released on 31 October, featuring all the members in a sexy concept. The song and music video was released on 6 November 2014.

=== 2015: Wiggle Wiggle and I'm Ill ===
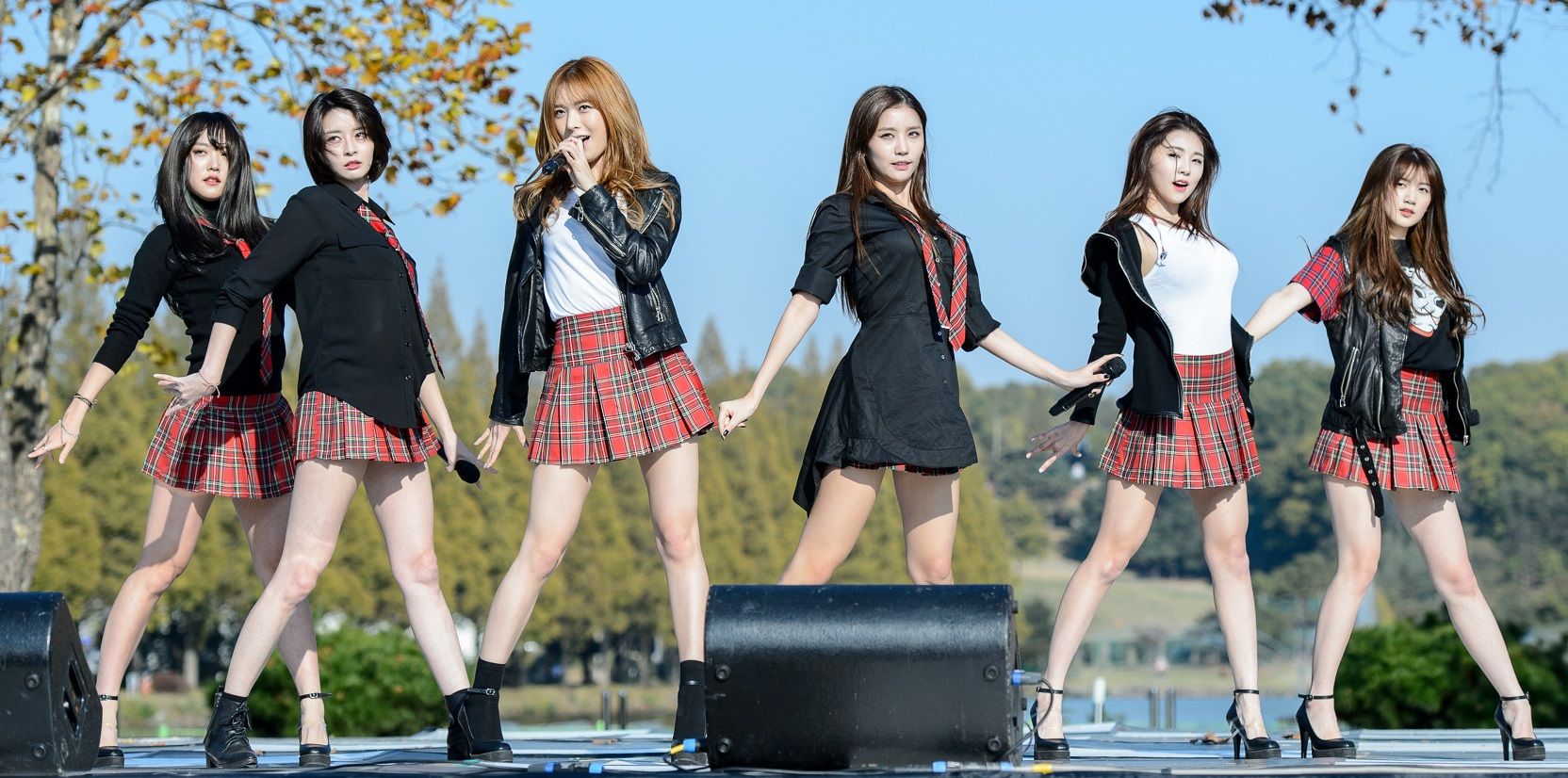
Hello Venus in 2015

On 20 December 2014, Fantagio announced the group would have a comeback with their fifth digital single, "Wiggle Wiggle", produced by Brave Brothers. On 23 December 2014, the first teaser video was released. On 2 January 2015, Fantagio posted the first teaser images of the members. The official music video was released on 8 January 2015. The group released their fifth mini album, I'm Ill, on 22 July 2015, promoting the song of the same name.

=== 2016–2019: Devine Channel collaboration, Mystery of Venus, and disbandment ===
On 5 May 2016 Fantagio announced that the group will have a comeback with a digital single called "Glow". The song is a collaboration with producing and writing team Devine Channel. On 6 May 2016 Fantagio posted the first teaser images of members, Nara, Yeoreum and Seoyoung. On 7 May 2016 Fantagio posted the second teaser images of members, Alice, Yooyoung and Lime. On 10 May, "Glow" was released as a digital single.

On 10 July, Fantagio announced that the group will be releasing a second collaboration song with Devine Channel, called "Paradise". The song was officially released on 18 July as a digital download and a music video for the song was released on the same day.

On 1 November, "Runway" was released as the final collaboration single with Devine Channel.

On 29 December 2016 it was reported that the group will be making a comeback with a mini-album on 11 January 2017. Mystery of Venus was released on 11 January 2017, in conjunction with the music video for the title track "Mysterious".

On 26 April 2019, it was confirmed that the group will disband after the members' contracts expired on 8 May 2019.

== Endorsements ==
In October 2012, five months after their debut, Hello Venus became endorsement models for Bugs 3.0, a smartphone music application from Neowiz Internet.

== Members ==
- Alice (앨리스)
- Nara (나라)
- Yoo Ara (유아라)
- Yoonjo (윤조)
- Lime (라임)
- Seoyoung (서영)
- Yooyoung (유영)
- Yeoreum (여름)

== Discography ==
=== Extended plays ===
Title	Album details	Peak chart positions	Sales
Title	Album details	KOR	Sales
Venus	Released: 9 May 2012; Label: Tricell Media; Formats: CD, digital download, streaming	—N/a	
What Are You Doing Today?	Released: 12 December 2012; Label: Tricell Media; Formats: CD, digital download, streaming	92	KOR: 984+ (2013)
Would You Stay for Tea?	Released: 2 May 2013; Label: Tricell Media; Formats: CD, digital download, streaming	6	KOR: 10,213+
I'm Ill	Released: 22 July 2015; Label: Fantagio Music; Formats: CD, digital download, streaming	7	KOR: 4,338+
Mystery of Venus	Released: 11 January 2017; Label: Fantagio Music; Formats: CD, digital download, streaming	12	KOR: 3,021+
"—" denotes releases that did not chart or were not released in that region.

=== Reissue ===
Title	Album details
Like a Wave	Released: 4 July 2012; Label: Tricell Media; Formats: Digital download, streaming

=== Live album ===
Title	Album details
Hello Venus Live Album 2013	Released: 13 August 2013; Label: Tricell Media; Formats: Digital download, streaming

=== Single album ===
Title	Album details	Peak chart positions	Sales
Title	Album details	KOR	Sales
Sticky Sticky	Released: 6 November 2014; Label: Fantagio Music; Formats: CD, digital download, streaming	6	KOR: 7,488

=== Singles ===
Title	Year	Peak chart position			Sales	Album
Title	Year	KOR	KOR Hot	US World	Sales	Album
"Venus"	2012	35	34	—	KOR: 600,430	Venus
"Like a Wave"	2012	60	60	—	KOR: 114,390	Like a Wave
"What Are You Doing Today?"	2012	37	38	—	KOR: 274,438	What Are You Doing Today?
"Would You Stay for Tea?"	2013	33	26	—	KOR: 293,504	Would You Stay for Tea?
"Sticky Sticky"	2014	87	—N/a	—	KOR: 49,665	Sticky Sticky
"Wiggle Wiggle"	2015	66	—N/a	8	KOR: 35,223	Non-album single
"I'm Ill"	2015	104	—N/a	—	KOR: 32,876	I'm Ill
"Glow"	2016	210	—N/a	—	KOR: 10,172	Mystery of Venus
"Paradise"	2016	226	—N/a	—	KOR: 8,000	Mystery of Venus
"Runway"	2016	—	—N/a	—	—N/a	Mystery of Venus
"Mysterious"	2017	—	—N/a	—	—N/a	Mystery of Venus
"—" denotes releases that did not chart or were not released in that region.

=== Promotional singles ===
Title	Year	Peak chart position		Album
Title	Year	KOR	KOR Hot	Album
"Romantic Love"	2013	97	—	What Are You Doing Today?
"Soldier Dance"	2015	—	—	Non-album single
"—" denotes releases that did not chart or were not released in that region.

=== Collaborations ===
Title	Year	Album
"All I Want" (with ASTRO, Weki Meki)	2018	FM2018_12Hz

=== Soundtrack appearances ===
Title	Year	Album
"Where Are You Now?" (어디있다 이제와)	2013	After School: Lucky or Not OST Part 2
"It's Just Love" (그냥 사랑인 거죠)	2014	Cunning Single Lady OST

=== Compilation appearances ===
Title	Year	Album
"When Tomorrow Comes" (내일이 찾아 오면)	2018	Immortal Songs: Singing the Legend (Park Jung-woon & Kim Min-woo)

=== Music videos ===
List of music videos, showing year released and director
Title	Year	Director(s)	Other version(s)
"Venus"	2012	Kim Hye-jung	
"What Are You Doing Today?"	2012	Digipedi	
"Would You Stay for Tea?"	2013	Hong Won-ki	
"Where Are You Now?"	2013	Unknown	
"Sticky Sticky"	2014	Hong Won-ki	
"Wiggle Wiggle"	2015	Unknown	
"Soldier Dance"	2015	Unknown	Dance Ver.
"I'm Ill"	2015	Hong Won-ki	Performance Ver.
"Glow"	2016	Kyle	
"Paradise"	2016	Kyle	
"Mysterious"	2017	Joo Hee-sun	

== Filmography ==
=== Reality shows ===
Year	Title	Network	Notes
2012	Birth of Venus	MBC Music	
2013	Diary Season 3	SBS MTV	with NU'EST
2013	Hello Beauty School	KBS Joy	

== Ambassadorships ==
Year	Organiser	Title	Ref.
2013	Seoul Metropolitan Government	2013 Seoul International Cartoon and Animation Festival Ambassador	
2013	Gangwon Provincial Government	2013 Saving Gangwon Provincial Traditional Market Ambassador	
2013	National Child Protection Agency	2013 Children's Abuse Prevention Day Ambassador	
2014	Green Umbrella Children Fund	Green Umbrella Children Fund Two-wheeled Dream Road Ambassador	
2014~2015	UN International Relief Organisation	Join Together Fund-raising Ambassador	

== Awards and nominations ==
Award	Year	Category	Result	Ref.
Mnet Asian Music Awards	2012	Best New Female Artist	Nominated	
Mnet Asian Music Awards	2012	Artist of the Year	Nominated	
Seoul Music Awards	2013	New Artist Award	Nominated	
Gaon Chart K-Pop Awards	2013	Newcomer Award (Female Group)	Won	
Asian Model Festival	2015	Popularity Award	Won	
