= I'm Ill =

Album by Hello Venus

EP by Hello Venus
- Released: July 22, 2015
- Genre: K-pop; dance; electronic; hip hop
- Length: 16:29
- Label: Fantagio Music; NHN Entertainment
- Producer: Brave Brothers; Park Hyunjoong; JS; Galactika; Chakun (Electroboyz)

Hello Venus chronology
Would You Stay For Tea? (2013)	I'm Ill (2015)	Mystery of Venus (2017)

Singles from I'm Ill
- 1. "I'm Ill" Released: July 22, 2015

Music video
- "I'm Ill (Performance Ver.)" on YouTube

I'm Ill (Korean: 난 예술이야; RR: Nan yesuriya; lit. 'I Am Art') is the fifth extended play by South Korean girl group Hello Venus. It was released on July 22, 2015, by Fantagio Music and distributed by NHN Entertainment. A song with the same name was used as the title track.

The EP was a commercial success peaking at number 7 on the Gaon Album Chart. It has sold over 4,300 physical copies as of August 2015.

== Release ==
The EP was digitally released on July 22, 2015, through several music portals, including MelOn in South Korea, and iTunes for the global market.

== Promotion ==
=== Live performances ===
The group held their first comeback stage on MBC Music's Show Champion on July 22, 2015, performing the title track. They continued on Mnet's M Countdown on July 23.

=== Single ===
"I'm Ill" was released as the title track in conjunction with the EP on July 22. The first music video teaser was released on July 20, 2015. A performance version of the music video was released on July 22, meanwhile the official music video was released on July 26.

== Commercial performance ==
I'm Ill debuted at number 7 on the Gaon Album Chart, on the chart issue dated July 26 - August 8, 2015. In its second week, the EP fell to number 13. The EP entered at number 19 on the chart, for the month of July 2015, with 3,379 physical copies sold. For the month of August, the EP placed at number 44 with additional 959 copies sold.

== Track listing ==
Digital download

No.	Title	Lyrics	Music	Arrangement	Length
1.	"I'm Ill" (난 예술이야)	Brave Brothers	Brave Brothers; Park Hyunjoong	Brave Brothers; Park Hyunjoong	3:22
2.	"Show Window"	Galactika	Brave Brothers; JS; Galactika	JS	3:29
3.	"Whatcha Talk About"	Chakun (Electroboyz)	Galactika; Chakun (Electroboyz)	Galactika	3:18
4.	"Chameleon" (카멜레온)	Brave Brothers; Chakun (Electroboyz)	Brave Brothers	Brave Brothers	3:00
5.	"I'm Ill" (Club Remix)	Brave Brothers	Brave Brothers; Park Hyunjoong	Brave Brothers; Park Hyunjoong	3:20
Total length:					16:29

== Charts ==
Chart (2015)	Peak position
South Korea (Gaon Weekly Album Chart)	7
South Korea (Gaon Monthly Album Chart)	19

== Release history ==
Region	Date	Format	Label
South Korea	July 22, 2015	Digital download	Tricell Media, NHN Bugs
Worldwide	July 22, 2015	Digital download	Tricell Media, NHN Bugs
