= Venus (Hello Venus EP) =

EP by Hello Venus
- Released: May 9, 2012
- Length: 12:52
- Label: Tricell Media; NHN Entertainment

Hello Venus chronology
Venus (2012)	What Are You Doing Today? (2012)

Singles from Venus
- 1. "Venus" Released: May 9, 2012

Alternative cover

Singles from Like a Wave
- 1. "Like a Wave" Released: July 4, 2012

Venus is the debut extended play by South Korean girl group Hello Venus. It was released on May 9, 2012, by Tricell Media and distributed by NHN Entertainment. "Venus" was released as the title track from the EP, and the group performed the song on South Korean music programs, including Music Bank and Inkigayo. A music video for the title track was also released on May 9.

A repackaged version, Like a Wave, was released on July 4, 2012.

== Background and release ==
On April 17, 2012, Pledis Entertainment announced through their official website their new girl group called Hello Venus, the second girl group from the label after After School debuted in 2009. On April 26, the first introductory video teaser and first image teaser were revealed, setting the stage for the release of their debut album for May 9, 2012. On May 3, a music video teaser was released, revealing the song "Venus" for the first time. It was also announced that member Yoonjo had suffered an injury and would only be participating in non dancing roles for the music video. On May 9, 2012, the music video for the title track "Venus" was released.

The EP was digitally released on May 9, 2012, through several music portals, including MelOn in South Korea, and iTunes for the global market.

== Promotion ==
In order to promote the mini-album, Hello Venus performed "Venus" on several South Korean music programs. They had their debut stage on Mnet's M Countdown on May 10, 2012, followed by KBS's Music Bank on May 11, MBC's Show! Music Core on May 12 and SBS's Inkigayo on May 13.

== Track listing ==
No.	Title	Lyrics	Music	Arrangement	Length
1.	"Hello"	Lime; David Kim; Jung Yoojin	Nao Tanaka	Nao Tanaka	2:19
2.	"Venus"	Kim Eana	Cho Youngsoo; Kim Taehyun	Cho Youngsoo; Kim Taehyun	2:58
3.	"Crush" (설레임; seolleim)	Park Deoksang	Park Deoksang	Park Deoksang	4:01
4.	"Love Appeal"	Jung Yoonwha	Daniel Barkman	Daniel Barkman	3:34
Total length:					12:52
