= List of songs written by Jinjin =

Park Jin-woo (Korean: 박진우), better known by his stage name Jinjin, is a South Korean rapper, dancer, singer, composer, and model. He is the leader of the South Korean boy group Astro and was a member of its sub-unit Jinjin & Rocky until its disbandment from bandmate Rocky's departure. Jinjin has co-written a majority of Astro's rap lyrics alongside Rocky.

== Songs ==
Key
†	Indicates single

All credits are listed under the Korea Music Copyright Association unless otherwise stated.

Song title, original artist, album of release, and year of release
Song	Artist(s)	Lyricist		Composer		Arranger		Album	Year
Song	Artist(s)	Credited	With	Credited	With	Credited	With	Album	Year
"1 in a Million"	Astro	Yes	Rocky, Maxine, EastWest1	No	—	No	—	All Light	2019
"12 Hrs" (12시간)	Astro	Yes	Rocky, D.Ham, Hanmiru Moon, Mirror Boy	No	—	No	—	Gateway	2020
"After Midnight" †	Astro	Yes	Cha Eun-woo, Rocky, Kim Yeon-seo, Kim Young-jin, Lee Jae-eun, Alexander Sean Michael, Sqvare, Ichinose Ayaka, Fernandes Carlyle Cosmas Savio	No	—	No	—	Switch On	2021
"Again" † (붙잡았어야 해)	Astro	Yes	Rocky, Kim Jwa-young, Obros	No	—	No	—	Winter Dream	2017
"Alive" †	Astro	Yes	Rocky, Minit, Ondine, Arcon, Bull$Eye	No	—	No	—	Non-album single	2021
"All About You" (다야)	Astro	Yes	Rocky, Kim Min-gu, Grvvity	No	—	No	—	Blue Flame	2019
"All Day"	Jinjin	Yes	Orae, Sam Carter, Dash Guy	Yes	Orae, Sam Carter, Dash Guy	Yes	Orae, Sam Carter, Dash Guy	Drive to the Starry Road	2022
"All Good"	Astro	No	—	Yes	Sam Carter, Nomasgood	No	—	All Yours	2021
"All Night" † (전화해)	Astro	Yes	Rocky, Cho Yun-kyoung, LDN Noise, Kyler Niko	No	—	No	—	All Light	2019
"All Stars"	Astro	Yes	Rocky, Hwang Eun-bit, Oh Ye-jin, Zupiter, Jeong Chae-yeon, Hwa Im-hyeon	No	—	No	—	All Yours	2021
"Always You" † (너잖아)	Astro	Yes	Black Edition (1), Duble Sidekick, Yoske, Bull$Eye	No	—	No	—	Rise Up	2018
"Baby" †	Astro	Yes	Rocky, Code9, Jinri, Glory Face1	No	—	No	—	Dream Part.01	2017
"Because It's You" (너라서)	Astro	Yes	Rocky, Jinri	No	—	No	—	Dream Part.01	2017
"Better With You" (어느새 우린)	Astro	Yes	Rocky, Seo Yong-bae, Lim Su-ho	No	—	No	—	Dream Part.02	2017
"Bloom" (피어나)	Astro	Yes	MJ, Rocky	Yes	MJ, Village	No	—	All Light	2019
"Blue Flame" †	Astro	Yes	Rocky, VO3E, Hwang Yu-bin, Tiyon "TC" Mack	No	—	No	—	Blue Flame	2019
"Breathless" † (숨가빠) (Note: not under KOMCA but was credited in the official tracklist for the rap making)	Astro	Yes	Rocky, Seo Yong-bae, Iggy	No	—	No	—	Summer Vibes	2016
"Butterfly"	Astro	Yes	Rocky, E.One1, E.One2	No	—	No	—	Dream Part.02	2017
"Butterfly Effect"	Astro	Yes	Hwang Yu-bin	No	—	No	—	All Yours	2021
"By Your Side" (너의 뒤에서)	Astro	Yes	MJ, Cha Eun-woo, Moonbin, Rocky, Yoon San-ha, C-no, Woong Kim, Iggy	No	—	No	—	Rise Up	2018
"Call Out" (외친다)	Astro	Yes	Rocky, Zomay, Kim Jong-sin, Obros, Real-Fantasy	No	—	No	—	Rise Up	2018
"Candy Sugar Pop" †	Astro	Yes	Moonbin, Rocky, Enzo, Mooni, 0wol	No	—	No	—	Drive to the Starry Road	2022
"Colored" (물들어)	Astro	Yes	Rocky, Park Woo-sang	No	—	No	—	Autumn Story	2016
"Confession" † (고백)	Astro	Yes	Rocky, Seo Yong-bae, Iggy	No	—	No	—	Autumn Story	2016
"Cotton Candy"	Astro	Yes	Rocky, Seo Yong-bae, Iggy	No	—	No	—	Winter Dream	2017
"Crazy Sexy Cool" † (니가 불어와)	Astro	Yes	Rocky, 100 Seo-jeong 2, 100 Seo-jeong 3, Adrian McKinnon, LDN Noise	No	—	No	—	Dream Part.02	2017
"Dear My Universe"	Astro	Yes	Rocky, Park Woo-sang	No	—	No	—	All Yours	2021
"Don't Worry"	Astro	Yes	Cha Eun-woo, Rocky, Obros, Obros 2	No	—	No	—	Switch On	2021
"Dream Night"	Astro	Yes	Rocky, Obros	No	—	No	—	Dream Part.01	2017
"Dreams Come True"	Astro	Yes	Rocky, Seo Yong-bae, Iggy	No	—	No	—	Dream Part.01	2017
"Every Minute"	Astro	Yes	Rocky, Seo Ji-eum, Stephan Elfgren, Chris Meyer	No	—	No	—	Dream Part.01	2017
"Fireworks" (불꽃놀이) (Note: not under KOMCA but was credited in the official tracklist for the rap making)	Astro	Yes	Rocky, Seo Yong-bae, Park Woo-sang	No	—	No	—	Summer Vibes	2016
"Gemini" (별비)	Astro	Yes	MJ, Rocky, Samin, Park Sang-min	No	—	No	—	All Yours	2021
"Go&Stop"	Astro	Yes	Ddol I Park, Peter Pan	No	—	No	—	Blue Flame	2019
"Growing Pains" (성장통) (Note: not under KOMCA but was credited in the official tracklist for the rap making)	Astro	Yes	Rocky, Seo Yong-bae, Iggy	No	—	No	—	Summer Vibes	2016
"Heart Brew Love"	Astro	Yes	Rocky, Dr.JO, Obi Mhondera, Kyler Niko, Al Swettenham	No	—	No	—	All Light	2019
"I'll Be There"	Astro	Yes	Rocky, Obros, Lee Jae-kyoung, Obros 2	No	—	No	—	Dream Part.01	2017
"Just Breath" † (숨 좀 쉬자)	Jinjin & Rocky	Yes	Rocky, Obros	Yes	Rocky, Obros, Nomasgood	No	—	Restore	2022
"Knock" † (널 찾아가)	Astro	Yes	Rocky, Lee Seu-ran, Giwon, Moon Yeo-reum	No	—	No	—	Gateway	2020
"Lazy"	Jinjin & Rocky feat. Choi Yoojung of Weki Meki	Yes	Orae, Sam Carter, Dash Guy	Yes	Orae, Sam Carter, Dash Guy	Yes	Orae, Sam Carter, Dash Guy	Restore	2022
"Lie" (다 거짓말)	Astro	Yes	Rocky, Seo Yong-bae, Iggy	No	—	No	—	Dream Part.01	2017
"Light the Sky" (하늘빛)	Astro	Yes	MJ, Rocky, Park Sang-min	No	—	No	—	Drive to the Starry Road	2022
"Lights On" (빛이 돼줄게)	Astro	Yes	Rocky, Orae, StarB ($mile)	Yes	Orae, StarB ($mile)	Yes	Orae, StarB ($mile)	Gateway	2020
"Like a King"	Jinjin feat. Superbee and MyunDo	Yes	Superbee, MyunDo	No	—	No	—	FM201.8	2018
"Like Stars" (밤하늘의 별처럼)	Astro	Yes	Rocky, Enzo, Mooni	No	—	No	—	Drive to the Starry Road	2022
"Lock Down"	Jinjin & Rocky	Yes	Orae, Sam Carter, Dash Guy	Yes	Orae, Sam Carter, Dash Guy	Yes	Orae, Sam Carter, Dash Guy	Restore	2022
"Lonely"	Astro	Yes	Rocky, Seo Yong-bae, Iggy	No	—	No	—	Autumn Story	2016
"Love Wheel"	Astro	Yes	Rocky, Znee, Lee Mi-so, Andrew Nicholas Love, David Amber	No	—	No	—	All Light	2019
"Mad Max"	Jinjin	Yes	—	Yes	Village	No	—	The 2nd Astroad to Seoul [Star Light]	2019
"Merry-Go-Round"	Astro	Yes	MJ, Cha Eun-woo, Moonbin, Rocky, Yoon San-ha, Maxine, EastWest1	No	—	No	—	All Light	2019
"Merry-Go-Round (Christmas Edition)" †	Astro	Yes	MJ, Cha Eun-woo, Moonbin, Rocky, Yoon San-ha, Maxine, EastWest1	No	—	No	—	Non-album single	2018
"Moonwalk"	Astro	Yes	Rocky, Cho Yun-kyoung, Choi Jin-suk, Rudi Daouk, Jakob Mihoubi	No	—	No	—	All Light	2019
"More"	Astro	Yes	Rocky, Orae, Sam Carter, Dash Guy	Yes	Orae, Sam Carter, Dash Guy	Yes	Orae, Sam Carter, Dash Guy	Drive to the Starry Road	2022
"My Style" (내 멋대로) (Note: not under KOMCA but was credited in the official tracklist for the rap making)	Astro	Yes	Rocky, Seo Yong-bae, Iggy	No	—	No	—	Summer Vibes	2016
"My Zone"	Astro	Yes	Rocky, Lee Jae-ni	Yes	Yoon San-ha, Sam Carter, Nomasgood	No	—	Switch On	2021
"No, I Don't.." † (아니 그래)	Astro	Yes	Cha Eun-woo, Rocky, Obros	No	—	No	—	Non-album single	2020
"One" †	Astro	Yes	Rocky, Lee Jae-ni, Ellie Suh, JJ Evans, Val Del Prete	No	—	No	—	All Yours	2021
"One & Only" †	Astro	Yes	MJ, Rocky, Zomay, Obros	Yes	MJ, Rocky, Ju Dae-gun, Zomay, Kim Kang-yun, Obros	No	—	Non-album single	2020
"Our Spring" (우리의 계절)	Astro	Yes	Rocky, Nomasgood, Obros	No	—	No	—	All Yours	2021
"Polaris" (북극성) (Note: not under KOMCA but was credited in the official tracklist for the rap making)	Astro	Yes	Rocky, Park Woo-sang	No	—	No	—	Summer Vibes	2016
"Real Love"	Astro	Yes	Rocky, Jinri, Glory Face1	No	—	No	—	Rise Up	2018
"Somebody Like"	Astro	Yes	Rocky, MosPick	No	—	No	—	Gateway	2020
"Something Something"	Astro	Yes	Rocky, PCDC	No	—	No	—	Drive to the Starry Road	2022
"Star" (별)	Astro	Yes	Rocky, Seo Yong-bae, Iggy	No	—	No	—	Autumn Story	2016
"Stardust"	Astro	Yes	Rocky, Rick Bridges, Kiggen	No	—	No	—	All Yours	2021
"Starry Sky"	Astro	Yes	Rocky, Hanmiru Moon, Korangi	No	—	No	—	All Light	2019
"Stay With Me" (내 곁에 있어줘)	Astro	Yes	Bily Acoustie	No	—	No	—	Rise Up	2018
"Sunset Sky" (노을 그림)	Astro	Yes	MJ, Rocky, Park Sang-min	No	—	No	—	Switch On	2021
"Treasure"	Astro	Yes	Rocky, Zupiter, Jeong Young-ah, Baek In-gyoung, Seo Seung-hee	No	—	No	—	All Light	2019
"U&Iverse" †	Astro	Yes	Rocky, Lee Hyung-suk	No	—	No	—	Non-album single	2022
Villain	Trendz	Yes	Orae, Dash Guy, Moode, Ra.L	Yes	Orae, Dash Guy, Moode	Yes	Orae, Dash Guy, Moode, Sam Carter	Blue Set Chapter 1. Tracks	2022
"Waterfall"	Astro	Yes	Lee Mi-sung, Kim Soo-jeong, Sean Michael Alexander, Drew Ryan Scott, Philip Andrew Schwan, Ichinose Ayaka	No	—	No	—	Switch On	2021
"We Still"	Astro	Yes	Rocky, Jun Sang-eun, Kim Chang-rock, Kim Su-bin, Erik Lidbom	No	—	No	—	Gateway	2020
"When the Wind Blows" (찬바람 불 때면)	Astro	Yes	Rocky	No	—	No	—	Blue Flame	2019
"When You Call My Name" (내 이름을 부를 때)	Astro	Yes	Rocky, Sendo, Hwang Yu-geun, Park Ji-ho	No	—	No	—	Gateway	2020
"You & Me (Thanks Aroha)"	Astro	Yes	MJ, Cha Eun-woo, Moonbin, Rocky, Yoon San-ha, Seo Yong-bae, Iggy	No	—	No	—	Winter Dream	2017
"You Smile" (니가 웃잖아)	Astro	Yes	Rocky, Jinri, Glory Face1	No	—	No	—	Dream Part.01	2017
"You're My World"	Astro	Yes	Rocky, Kim Chang-rock, Kim Su-bin	No	—	No	—	Blue Flame	2019
"Your Love" (사랑이)	Astro	Yes	Rocky, Lee Hoo-sang, Mingkey	No	—	No	—	Autumn Story	2016
