= Astro discography =

- Studio albums: 3
- EPs: 10
- Singles: 14
- Music videos: 15
- Soundtrack appearances: 2
- Single albums: 2

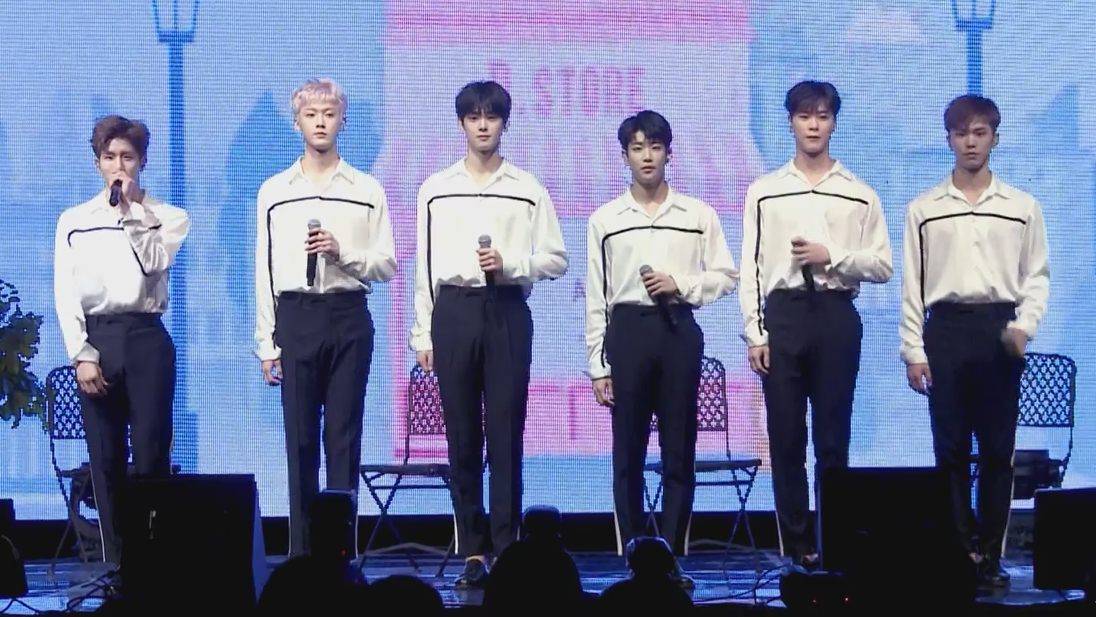
Astro performing in 2017

South Korea-based boy group Astro have released three studio albums, ten extended plays, two single albums, and 14 singles.

== Studio albums ==
List of studio albums, with selected details and chart positions
Title	Details	Peak chart positions				Sales	Certifications (Note: In April 2018, the Korea Music Content Association introduced music recording certifications for albums and singles.)
Title	Details	KOR	JPN	JPN Hot	US World	Sales	Certifications
All Light	Released: January 16, 2019; Label: Fantagio Music; Formats: CD, download, streaming	1	7	—	6	KOR: 135,847; JPN: 25,072	
All Yours	Released: April 5, 2021; Label: Fantagio Music; Formats: CD, download, streaming	1	1	—	—	KOR: 360,911; JPN: 58,259	KMCA: Platinum
Drive to the Starry Road	Released: May 16, 2022; Label: Fantagio Music; Formats: CD, download, streaming	1	6	8	—	KOR: 253,767; JPN: 27,574	KMCA: Platinum
"—" denotes releases that did not chart or were not released in that region.

== Extended plays ==
=== Korean extended plays ===
List of Korean extended plays, with selected chart positions and sales
Title	Details	Peak chart positions				Sales	Certifications
Title	Details	KOR	JPN	JPN Hot	US World	Sales	Certifications
Spring Up	Released: February 23, 2016; Label: Fantagio Music; Formats: CD, download, streaming; Track listing: 1. Ok! Ready (Ok! 준비완료); 2. Hide & Seek (숨바꼭질); 3. Innocent Love (풋사랑); 4. Morning Call (모닝콜); 5. Cat's Eye (장화 신은 고양이)	4	31	—	6	KOR: 26,712; JPN: 4,806	—N/a
Summer Vibes	Released: July 1, 2016; Label: Fantagio Music; Formats: CD, download, streaming; Track listing: 1. Fireworks (불꽃놀이); 2. Breathless (숨가빠); 3. Growing Pains (성장통); 4. Polaris (북극성); 5. My Style (내 멋대로); 6. Breathless (숨가빠) (Acoustic version)	2	33	—	6	KOR: 31,288; JPN: 4,869	—N/a
Autumn Story	Released: November 10, 2016; Label: Fantagio Music; Formats: CD, download, streaming; Track listing: 1. Lonely; 2. Confession (고백); 3. Your Love (사랑이); 4. Colored (물들어); 5. Star (별); 6. Confession Talk (고백 Talk) (CD Only)	6	18	—	15	KOR: 78,829; JPN: 10,539	—N/a
Dream Part.01	Released: May 29, 2017; Label: Fantagio Music; Formats: CD, download, streaming; Track listing: 1. Dreams Come True; 2. Baby; 3. You Smile (니가 웃잖아); 4. Because It's You (너라서); 5. Dream Night; 6. I'll Be There; 7. Lie (다 거짓말); 8. Every Minute	1	19	—	6	KOR: 119,126; JPN: 17,593	—N/a
Dream Part.02	Released: November 1, 2017; Label: Fantagio Music; Formats: CD, download, streaming; Track listing: 1. With You; 2. Crazy Sexy Cool (니가 불어와); 3. Butterfly; 4. Run; 5. Better With You (어느새 우린)	2	17	—	5	KOR: 86,290; JPN: 13,647	—N/a
Rise Up	Released: July 24, 2018; Label: Fantagio Music; Formats: CD, download, streaming; Track listing: 1. Always You (너잖아); 2. By Your Side (너의 뒤에서); 3. Call Out (외친다); 4. Stay with Me (내 곁에 있어줘); 5. Real Love	2	14	—	7	KOR: 52,391; JPN: 8,069	—N/a
Blue Flame	Released: November 20, 2019; Label: Fantagio Music; Formats: CD, download, streaming; Track listing: 1. Blue Flame; 2. Go&Stop; 3. All About You (다야); 4. When the Wind Blows (찬바람 불 때면); 5. You're My World	2	7	—	—	KOR: 131,485; JPN: 28,306 (Phy.)	—N/a
Gateway	Released: May 4, 2020; Label: Fantagio Music; Formats: CD, download, streaming; Track listing: 1. Knock (널 찾아가); 2. When You Call My Name (내 이름을 부를 때); 3. Somebody Like; 4. We Still; 5. 12 Hours (12시간); 6. Lights On (빛이 돼줄게)	1	3	38	—	KOR: 130,971; JPN: 32,252 (Phy.)	—N/a
Switch On	Released: August 2, 2021; Label: Fantagio Music; Formats: CD, download, streaming; Track listing: 1. After Midnight; 2. Footprint (발자국); 3. Waterfall; 4. My Zone; 5. Don't Worry	1	2	—	—	KOR: 310,979; JPN: 59,361 (Phy.)	KMCA: Platinum
"—" denotes releases that did not chart or were not released in that region.

=== Japanese extended plays ===
List of Japanese extended plays, with selected chart positions and sales
Title	Details	Peak chart positions	Sales
Title	Details	JPN	Sales
Venus	Released: April 3, 2019 (JPN); Label: Universal Music Japan; Formats: CD, download, streaming; Track listing: 1. Always You (Japanese ver.); 2. 花咲ケミライ; 3. Baby (Japanese ver.); 4. II愛してる; 5. All Night (Japanese ver.); 6. I'm on Your Side	3	JPN: 30,401

== Single albums ==
List of single albums, with selected details and chart positions
Title	Details	Peak chart positions			Sales
Title	Details	KOR	JPN	US World	Sales
Winter Dream	Released: February 22, 2017; Label: Fantagio Music; Formats: CD, download, streaming	2	27	—	KOR: 30,157; JPN: 5,692
One & Only	Released: March 13, 2020; Label: Fantagio Music; Formats: CD, download, streaming	4	—	—	KOR: 30,000
"—" denotes releases that did not chart or were not released in that region.

== Singles ==
List of singles, with selected chart positions, showing year released and album name
Title	Year	Peak chart positions					Album
Title	Year	KOR	KOR Hot	JPN	JPN Hot	US World	Album
Korean
"Hide & Seek" (숨바꼭질)	2016	—	—	—	—	—	Spring Up
"Breathless" (숨가빠)	2016	—	—	—	—	21	Summer Vibes
"Confession" (고백)	2016	—	—	—	—	—	Autumn Story
"Again" (붙잡았어야 해)	2017	—	—	—	—	—	Winter Dream
"Baby"	2017	—	2	—	—	24	Dream Part.01
"Crazy Sexy Cool" (니가 불어와)	2017	—	—	—	—	11	Dream Part.02
"Always You" (너잖아)	2018	— (Note: "Always You" did not enter the Gaon Digital Chart, but appeared at number 95 on the component Download Chart.)	—	—	—	—	Rise Up
"All Night" (전화해)	2019	154	38	—	—	6	All Light
"Blue Flame"	2019	— (Note: "Blue Flame" did not enter the Gaon Digital Chart, but appeared at number 56 on the component Download Chart.)	—	—	—	14	Blue Flame
"Knock" (널 찾아가)	2020	129	95	—	54	—	Gateway
"One"	2021	17	94	—	—	15	All Yours
"After Midnight"	2021	4	88	—	—	24	Switch On
"Candy Sugar Pop"	2022	10	*	—	—	—	Drive to the Starry Road
Japanese
"Hanasakemirai"	2019	—	—	—	—	—	Venus
"Let's Say Goodbye to my Favorite Person"	2022	—	—	8	—	—	Non-album singles
"—" denotes releases that did not chart or were not released in that region. "*" denotes a chart did not exist at that time.

== Promotional singles ==
Title	Year	Peak chart positions	Album
Title	Year	KOR	Album
"Cat's Eye" (장화 신은 고양이)	2016	—	Spring Up
"One & Only"	2020	— (Note: "One & Only" did not enter the Gaon Digital Chart, but appeared at number 138 on the component Download Chart.)	Non-album singles
"No, I Don't" (아니 그래)	2020	— (Note: "No, I Don't" did not enter the Gaon Digital Chart, but appeared at number 37 on the component Download Chart and at number 93 on the component BGM Chart.)	Non-album singles
"We Still (Be With U)"	2020	— (Note: "We Still (Be With U)" did not enter the Gaon Digital Chart, but appeared at number 128 on the component Download Chart.)	Non-album singles
"Alive" (Note: "Alive" was released as a promotional single in collaboration with Universe.)	2021	— (Note: "Alive" did not enter the Gaon Digital Chart, but appeared at number 103 on the component Download Chart.)	Non-album singles
"U&Iverse" (Note: "U&Iverse" was released as a promotional single in collaboration with Universe.)	2022	— (Note: "U&Iverse" did not enter the Circle Digital Chart, but appeared at number 96 on the component Download Chart.)	Non-album singles
"Circles"	2024	— (Note: "Circles" did not enter the Circle Digital Chart, but appeared at number 49 on the component Download Chart.)	Non-album singles
"Twilight"	2025	— (Note: "Twilight" did not enter the Circle Digital Chart, but appeared at number 57 on the component Download Chart.)	Non-album singles
"—" denotes releases that did not chart or were not released in that region.

== Collaborative singles ==
Title	Year	Peak chart positions		Album
Title	Year	KOR	US World	Album
"All I Want" (with Hello Venus, Weki Meki)	2018	—	—	FM2018_12Hz
"Moon" (꿈속의 문) (with Viviz, Minhyuk, Kihyun, I.M, Hoshi, Wonwoo, Mingyu, DK, Seungkwan, Hello Gloom, Rocky, Yoojung, Doyeon, Chani, Bang Chan, Moon Sua	2025	— (Note: "Moon" did not enter the Circle Digital Chart, but appeared at number 61 on the component Download Chart.)	4	Non-album singles

== Soundtracks ==
Title	Year	Peak positions	Sales	Network	Ref.
Title	Year	JPN	Sales	Network	Ref.
"All Good (JP Ver.)" (from Kazuhiro Teranishi Drama: Jinsei Iroiro)	2021	—	—N/a	Tokyo MX	
"Let's Say Goodbye to My Favorite Person" (1番好きな人にサヨナラを言おう) (Note: "Let's Say Goodbye to My Favorite Person" music video was released on November 30, 2022.) (from Shinji Nojima's FOD Drama: My Erotic Boyfriend Fascinates Me)	2021	8	JPN: 11,942	Fuji TV	
"—" denotes releases that did not chart or were not released in that region.

== Videography ==
Year	Title	Album	Director
Korean
2016	"Hide & Seek" (숨바꼭질)	Spring Up	Hwang Soo-Ah
2016	"Cat's Eye" (장화 신은 고양이)	Spring Up	Unknown
2016	"Breathless" (숨가빠)	Summer Vibes	Hwang Soo-Ah
2016	"Confession" (고백)	Autumn Story	Hwang Soo-Ah
2017	"Baby"	Dream Part.01	Joo Hee-Sun
2017	"Crazy Sexy Cool" (니가 불어와)	Dream Part.02	Hwang Soo-Ah
2018	"Always You" (너잖아)	Rise Up	SUNNYVISUAL
2019	"All Night" (전화해)	All Light	DAWITTGOLD
2019	"Blue Flame"	Blue Flame	DAWITTGOLD
2020	"Knock" (널 찾아가)	Gateway	Yua Suh (Flipevil)
2021	"One"	All Yours	Wooje Kim (ETUI)
2021	"After Midnight"	Switch On	Paranoid Paradigm (VM Project Architecture)
2021	"Alive"	Non-album single	725 (SL8)
2022	"Candy Sugar Pop"	Drive to the Starry Road	Yoo Sungkyun (SUNNYVISUAL)
2022	"U&Iverse"	Non-album single	Roh Ji-hoon (Studio Sapiens)
Japanese
2019	"Hanasakemirai" (花咲ケミライ)	Venus	Kyotaro Hayashi
2022	"Let's Say Goodbye to my Favorite Person"	Non-album single	Unknown
