= List of Astro concert tours =

Astro live performances
- Concert tours: 8
- Concerts: 2
- Fan meeting tours: 1
- Showcases: 13
- Other: 64

The South Korean boy band Astro has performed in eight concert tours (one of which has been worldwide), nine concerts, one fan meeting tour, thirteen showcases, and 64 other live performances since their debut in 2016.

== Tours ==
Title	Dates	Associated album(s)	Continent(s)	Shows	Attendance	Ref.
The 1st Astroad to Seoul	July 15, 2017 – July 16, 2017	Spring Up; Summer Vibes; Autumn Story; Winter Dream; Dream Part.01	Asia	2	6,000	
The 1st Astroad to Japan	August 23, 2017 – August 30, 2017	Spring Up; Summer Vibes; Autumn Story; Winter Dream; Dream Part.01	Asia	5	10,000	
The 1st Astroad to Taipei	January 20, 2018	Spring Up; Summer Vibes; Autumn Story; Winter Dream; Dream Part.01; Dream Part.02	Asia	1	2,000	
The 2nd Astroad to Japan	August 1, 2018 – August 8, 2018	Rise Up	Asia	6	12,000	
The 2nd Astroad to Seoul [Star Light] (Part 1)	December 22, 2018 – December 23, 2018	Rise Up	Asia	2	6,000	
The 2nd Astroad to Seoul [Star Light] (Part 2)	March 16, 2019 – April 27, 2019	All Light	Asia; North America	7	—N/a	
The 3rd Astroad to Seoul [Stargazer]	May 28, 2022 – May 29, 2022	All Yours; Switch On; Drive to the Starry Road	Asia	2	—N/a	
The 3rd Astroad to Japan [Stargazer]	June 3, 2022 – June 4, 2022	All Yours; Switch On; Drive to the Starry Road	Asia	2	40,000	

== Concerts ==
Title	Date(s)	City	Country	Venue	Attendance	Ref.
Astro 2016 Mini LIVE – Thankx Aroha	August 27, 2016 – August 28, 2016	Seoul	South Korea	KEPCO Art Center	3,000	
The 1st Astro Aroha Festival (2017)	February 26, 2017	Seoul	South Korea	Jangchung Arena	—N/a	
Astro 1st Mini Concert in Taipei	February 28, 2017	Taipei	Taiwan	National Taiwan University Sports Center	—N/a	
Astro 1st Show in Hong Kong	March 3, 2017	Hong Kong	China	Macpherson Stadium	—N/a	
The 2nd Astro Aroha Festival	February 24, 2018	Seoul	South Korea	KBS Arena	—N/a	
The 3rd Astro Aroha Festival [Black]	March 2, 2019	Seoul	South Korea	Olympic Hall	—N/a	
The 4th Astro Aroha Festival [Campus]	March 7, 2020	Seoul	South Korea	Olympic Hall	—N/a	
2020 Astro Live on WWW. (Note: This concert was broadcast online due to concerns over the COVID-19 pandemic.)	June 28, 2020	Seoul	South Korea	—N/a	—N/a	
2022 Astro Aroha Festival [Gate 6]	April 9, 2022	Seoul	South Korea	SK Olympic Handball Gymnasium	—N/a	

== Showcases ==
Title	Date(s)	City	Country	Venue(s)	Ref.
Spring Up Album Showcase	February 22, 2016 – February 23, 2016	Seoul	South Korea	Lotte Card Art Center; Wapop Concert Hall	
Summer Vibes Album Showcase	June 30, 2016	Seoul	South Korea	Ilchi Art Hall	
Astro The 1st Season Showcase in Tokyo	October 14, 2016	Tokyo	Japan	Tsutaya O-East	
Astro The 1st Season Showcase in Jakarta	October 22, 2016	Jakarta	Indonesia	Nusa Indah Theater	
Autumn Story Album Showcase	November 9, 2016	Seoul	South Korea	Ilchi Art Hall	
Astro The 1st Season Showcase in Bangkok	February 12, 2017	Bangkok	Thailand	GMM Live House at CentralWorld (Floor 8)	
Astro The 1st Showcase in Singapore	March 5, 2017	Singapore		Resorts World Sentosa	
Dream Part.01 Album Showcase	May 26, 2017 (press); May 29, 2017 (public)	Seoul	South Korea	Blue Square	
All Light Album Showcase	January 16, 2019	Seoul	South Korea	V Live live stream	
Gateway Album Showcase	May 4, 2020	Seoul	South Korea	V Live live stream	
Switch On Album Showcase	August 2, 2021	Seoul	South Korea	Naver NOW live stream	
Drive to the Starry Road Album Showcase	May 16, 2022	Seoul	South Korea	Universe live stream	

== Joint tours and concerts ==
Title	Date(s)	City	Country	Venue(s)	Performed song(s)	Ref.
2016 Sharing Hope '1 Meter 1 KRW' Charity Walk	April 23, 2016	Suwon	South Korea	Gwanggyo Lake Park		
Fantagio Square Completion D-30 Celebration Performance	April 30, 2016	Busan	South Korea	Haeundae Square		
Arirang Radio K-Poppin'	May 4, 2016	Incheon	South Korea	Incheon International Airport Millenium Hall		
Yangsan Bear Festival	May 6, 2016	Yangsan	South Korea	Ungsang Sports Park		
Seo Kang-joon's We Like 2Night	May 20, 2016	Seoul	South Korea	Lotte World		
Korean Youth Association Ambassador PR Event	May 21, 2016	Gwacheon	South Korea	Seoul Land		
2016 U Clean Concert (Note: Cha Eun-woo was absent from this schedule.)	May 28, 2016	Seoul	South Korea	Seoul World Cup Stadium		
Suwon K-Pop Super Concert	June 17, 2016 – June 18, 2016	Suwon	South Korea	Suwon World Cup Stadium		
Ulsan Summer Music Festival (USF)	July 25, 2016	Ulsan	South Korea	Ulsan Sports Complex		
KCON 2016 LA	July 31, 2016	Los Angeles	United States	Staples Center		
Show Champion in Manila	September 3, 2016	Manila	Philippines	SM Mall of Asia Arena		
2016 K-Pop World Festival	September 30, 2016	Changwon	South Korea	Changwon Stadium		
Busan One Asia Festival – K-pop Concert (Stage 3)	October 2, 2016 – October 4, 2016	Busan	South Korea	BEXCO		
2016 Korea Auxiliary Engineering Machinery Expo	November 16, 2016	Seoul	South Korea	Yangjae aT Center		
2016 Super Seoul Dream Concert	November 27, 2016	Seoul	South Korea	Gocheok Sky Dome		
Gwangmyeong Speedom Love Concert	November 30, 2016	Gwangmyeong	South Korea	Gwangmyeong Speedom		
2016 SAF Boom Up Show	December 22, 2016	Seoul	South Korea	COEX Convention & Exhibition Center		
