= List of Gaon Album Chart number ones of 2021 =

The Gaon Album Chart is a South Korean record chart that ranks the best-selling albums and EPs in South Korea. It is part of the Gaon Music Chart, which launched in February 2010. The data is compiled by the Ministry of Culture, Sports and Tourism and the Korea Music Content Industry Association based upon weekly/monthly physical album sales by major South Korean distributors such as Kakao Entertainment, YG Plus, Sony Music Korea, Warner Music Korea, Universal Music and Dreamus.

== Weekly charts ==
Week ending date	Album	Artist	Ref.
January 2	Minisode1: Blue Hour	Tomorrow X Together	
January 9	NCT 2020 Resonance Pt. 2	NCT	
January 16	The First Step: Treasure Effect	Treasure	
January 23	Noir	U-Know	
January 30	Dystopia: Road to Utopia	Dreamcatcher	
February 6	Hello Chapter Ø: Hello, Strange Dream	CIX	
February 13	2nd Desire (Tasty)	Kim Woo-seok	
February 20	Be	BTS	
February 27	Don't Call Me	Shinee	
March 6	Zero: Fever Part.2	Ateez	
March 13	Kick Back	WayV	
March 20	The Renaissance	Super Junior	
March 27	Lilac	IU	
April 3	Bambi	Baekhyun	
April 10	All Yours	Astro	
April 17	Yellow	Kang Daniel	
April 24	Bambi	Baekhyun	
May 1	Border: Carnival	Enhypen	
May 8	Beautiful Night	Yesung	
May 15	Hot Sauce	NCT Dream	
May 22	Hot Sauce	NCT Dream	
May 29	Hot Sauce	NCT Dream	
June 5	The Chaos Chapter: Freeze	Tomorrow X Together	
June 12	Don't Fight the Feeling	Exo	
June 19	Your Choice	Seventeen	
June 26	Your Choice	Seventeen	
July 3	Hello Future	NCT Dream	
July 10	Butter	BTS	
July 17	Butter	BTS	
July 24	Butter	BTS	
July 31	Empathy	D.O.	
August 7	Switch On	Astro	
August 14	Thrill-ing	The Boyz	
August 21	The Chaos Chapter: Fight or Escape	Tomorrow X Together	
August 28	Noeasy	Stray Kids	
September 4	Noeasy	Stray Kids	
September 11	Lalisa	Lisa	
September 18	Sticker	NCT 127	
September 25	Sticker	NCT 127	
October 2	Sticker	NCT 127	
October 9	Savage	Aespa	
October 16	Dimension: Dilemma	Enhypen	
October 23	Attacca	Seventeen	
October 30	Attacca	Seventeen	
November 6	Maverick	The Boyz	
November 13	Formula of Love: O+T=<3	Twice	
November 20	No Limit	Monsta X	
November 27	Rumination	SF9	
December 4	Christmas EveL	Stray Kids	
December 11	Zero: Fever Epilogue	Ateez	
December 18	Universe	NCT	
December 25	Eleven	Ive	

== Monthly charts ==
Month	Album	Artist	Sales	Ref.
January	The First Step: Treasure Effect	Treasure	266,894	
February	Be	BTS	763,083	
March	Bambi	Baekhyun	591,944	
April	Border: Carnival	Enhypen	522,136	
May	Hot Sauce	NCT Dream	1,995,091	
June	Your Choice	Seventeen	1,391,964	
July	Butter	BTS	2,490,969	
August	Noeasy	Stray Kids	1,127,800	
September	Sticker	NCT 127	2,277,575	
October	Attacca	Seventeen	1,968,829	
November	Christmas EveL	Stray Kids	654,658	
December	Universe	NCT	1,630,715	
