= MJ (South Korean singer) =

South Korean singer (born 1994)

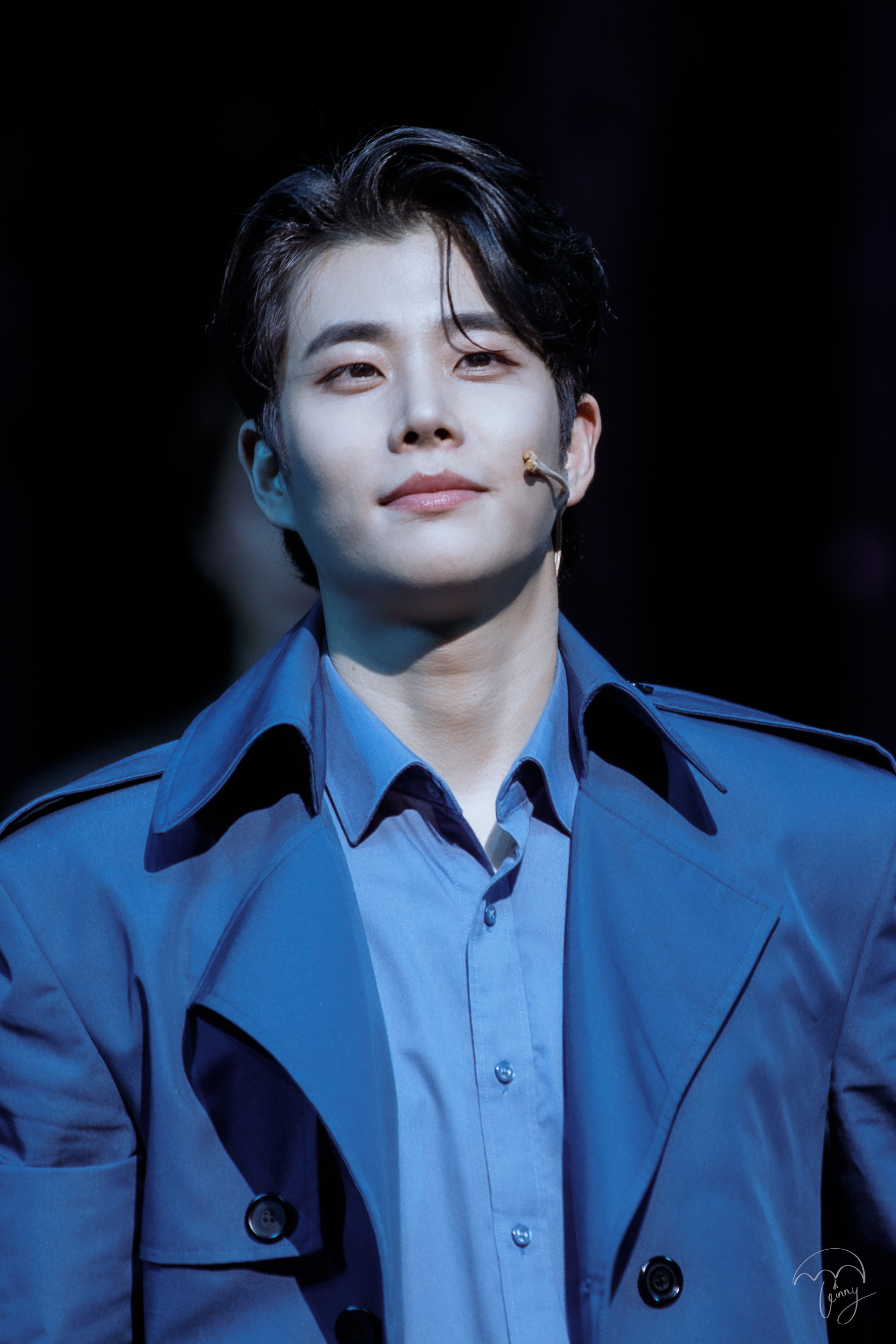
- MJ in 2024
- Born: Kim Myung-jun; March 5, 1994 (age 32); Suwon, Gyeonggi, South Korea
- Occupations: Singer; actor
- Musical career
- Genre: K-pop
- Instrument: Vocals
- Years active: 2015–present
- Label: Fantagio
- Member of: Astro; Super Five; Zoonizini

Korean name
- Hangul: 김명준
- Hanja: 金明俊
- RR: Gim Myeongjun
- MR: Kim Myŏngjun

Kim Myung-jun (Korean: 김명준; March 5, 1994), known professionally as MJ (엠제이), is a South Korean singer and actor managed under the label of Fantagio. He debuted in 2016 as the main vocalist of the South Korean six-member boy group Astro. In August 2020, he debuted as one of the five members of an idol trot group named Super Five through MBC TV's reality trot show Favorite Entertainment.

== Life and career ==
=== 2012–2015: Pre-debut ===
MJ was a contestant in the 2012 JYP Entertainment X HUM Audition and won a one-year scholarship from Seoul Arts College.

MJ took part in Fantagio's iTeen, a rookie talent development program managed under the label of Fantagio. He and other members of Astro were known as iTeen Boys.

MJ and the other Astro members starred in a web drama series named "To be Continued" which featured the members as themselves.

=== 2016–2019: Debut with Astro and solo activities ===
MJ officially debuted as a member of Astro on February 23, 2016. During Astro's 2nd ASTROAD To Seoul "Starlight" concert which was held on December 22–23, 2018, MJ performed his solo trot stage "Cheok Cheok". It was included in the DVD of the concert which was released in June 2019.

In February 2019, MJ sang his first OST titled "You're My Everything" for the Korean drama, My Only One. Also in February 2019, MJ along with Jin Ju, Hyomin, Heo Kyung-hwan, Kang Tae-oh travelled to Nha Trang for the Korean travel show "Have To Go to Know". In March 2019, MJ and Jinjin took part in the travel/variety show project of Celuv TV - Go Together, Travel Alone. The show was filmed in Saipan and includes Tony Ahn, Han Seung-yeon, Jin Jin and Kim So-hye. It was later on released in a DVD format. In June 2019, he co-hosted Insane Quiz Show Season 2, also abbreviated as "이세퀴" and "IQS S2", with BtoB's Illhoon and Loona's Chuu. In July 2019, MJ and Yoon San-ha were confirmed to be the MCs of the tvN D's variety talk show Blanket Kick at Night. In August 2019, MJ appeared in King of Masked Singer as Driver Kim. Also in February 2019, MJ along with Jin Ju, Hyomin, Heo Kyung-hwan, Kang Tae-oh travelled to Nha Trang for the Korean travel show "Have To Go to Know".

=== 2020–present: Musical debut, Super Five, solo debut and Sub-unit debut ===
In April 2020, MJ sang another OST for the Korean drama, Eccentric! Chef Moon titled "Sweet Spring". In that same month, it was confirmed that MJ, together with 2AM's Jo Kwon, NU'EST's Ren, and Shin Joo Hyup were cast for the Korean version of the musical Everybody's Talking About Jamie, a musical based on a true story of a teenager named Jamie who aspires to become a drag queen. The musical was scheduled from July 4 to September 11 at LG Arts Center in Gangnam. On the September 11, 2020, MJ successfully finished his last show for the musical as Jamie.

In July 2020, MJ was cast in MBC's Favorite Entertainment. He was selected as one of the five members of the idol trot group formed by Jang Yoon Jung and in charge of visual of the group. The project boy group debuted on MBC's Music Core on August 22, 2020, under the name Super Five (다섯장). MJ promoted with Super Five using his real name Kim Myung Jun. The group consists of Pentagon's Lee Hoe-taek, A.cian's Chu Hyeok-jin, Park Hyeong-seok and Ok Jin-wook. The group debuted with the songs "Hello" and "All Eyes on You".

In 2021, he became the only MC for the 2nd season of Fact In Star. On October 14, Fantagio confirmed that MJ will debut as a solo artist with a semi-trot song to be released in November, which features Kim Tae-yeon from Miss Trot. Young Tak was also participating in the production of said song.

On October 18, it was confirmed that MJ was cast to play the role 'Daniel' in the musical 'Jack the Ripper'. MJ will play the role together with Uhm ki joon, F.T. Island's Lee Hong-ki and SF9's Inseong. The musical is slated to open on December 3 at the KEPCO Art Center in Seoul. On October 28, 2021, MJ was announced as part of G-Market's mystery romance thriller web drama called Find Me If You Can. He played the role of a long time friend with the main lead actress. It was premiered on November 9, 2021, via INSSA OPPA G YouTube Channel.

On November 3, MJ debuted as a solo artist with two songs — "Get Set Yo" and "Valet Parking". On November 29, he won in SBS's The Trot Show and is the first idol to ever win first place on The Trot Show. On February 3, 2022, the agency confirmed that MJ would temporarily suspend his activities due to illness.

On November 8, 2023, after being discharged from the military, MJ was cast in the musical Winter Wanderer (as Han Min Woo, alongside Lee Chang Sub (BTOB), Ren, and Inseong (SF9). The musical is based on the classic novel of the same name by the late contemporary writer Choi In-ho (1945–2013). The musical returns after 18 years since its premiere in 1997 to a newly recreated stage to commemorate the 10th anniversary of the late writer. The musical ran from December 15, 2023, to February 25, 2024. On February 23, 2024, MJ successfully finished his last performance.

On May 29, 2024, MJ released the song "One Last Dream" as the 4th OST for the currently airing drama "Dare to Love Me". On August 14, it was confirmed that MJ was cast to play the role legendary hero 'Zorro' in the musical 'Zorro: Actor Musician', which will begin airing on September 11. On September 24, MJ released a single titled "Why so pretty?" through various online music sites. On December 18, MJ had renew his contract with the agency.

On ่July 29, 2025, Fantagio announced that members MJ and Jinjin would form Astro's third sub-unit, Zoonizini. The duo released their debut extended play Dice and its lead single "Some Things Never Change" on August 13, 2025.

== Personal life ==
=== Military service ===
MJ enlisted in the military band as part of his mandatory military service on May 9, 2022. He was discharged from military service on November 8, 2023.

== Discography ==
=== Singles ===
List of singles, showing year released, selected chart positions, and name of the album
Title	Year	Peak chart positions	Album	Ref.
Title	Year	KOR	Album	Ref.
As lead artist
"Don't Do It" (척척 (척척하지 마세요))	2019	—	The 2nd Astroad to Seoul [Star Light]	
"Get Set Yo" (계세요) (featuring Kim Tae-yeon)	2021	103	Happy Virus	
"Valet Parking" (발렛 파킹)	2021	— (Note: "Valet Parking" did not enter the Gaon Digital Chart, but appeared at number 76 on the component Download Chart.)	Happy Virus	
"Story"	2022	— (Note: "Story" did not enter the Gaon Digital Chart, but appeared at number 80 on the component Download Chart.)	Drive to the Starry Road	
"Why So Pretty?" (왜 이렇게 예뻐)	2024	— (Note: "Why So Pretty?" did not enter the Circle Digital Chart, but appeared at number 34 on the component Download Chart.)	Non-album singles	
"Love You" (사랑해요) (with Mew)	2025	164	Non-album singles	
"1-10, 1분 전 (9에서 멈췄어)"	2026	—	Right..?	
Collaborations
"Like Today" (오늘처럼) (featuring Lucy of Weki Meki)	2018	—	FM2018_08Hz	
"Twist King" (with Shin Joo-hyup and Jo Kwon)	2020	—	Immortal Songs: Singing the Legend (Kim Jong-guk x Turbo Part 1)	
Soundtrack appearances
"All of My Life" (내 삶의 전부)	2019	—	My Only One OST	
"Sweet Spring" (봄날애(愛))	2020	—	Eccentric! Chef Moon OST	
"Walking in the Memory" (봄날의 기억)	2022	— (Note: "Walking in the Memory" did not enter the Gaon Digital Chart, but appeared at number 163 on the component Download Chart.)	Crush of Spring OST	
"One Last Dream" (마지막 꿈)	2024	—	Dare to Love Me OST Part 4	
"—" denotes a recording that did not chart or was not released in that territory

=== Songwriting credits ===
All credits are listed under the Korea Music Copyright Association unless otherwise stated.

Year	Title	Artist	Album	Lyricist	Composer	Arranger
2017	"You & Me (Thanks Aroha)"	Astro	Winter Dream	Yes	No	No
2018	"By Your Side" (너의 뒤에서)	Astro	Rise Up	Yes	No	No
2018	"Merry-Go-Round (Christmas Edition)"	Astro	Non-album single	Yes	No	No
2019	"Merry-Go-Round"	Astro	All Light	Yes	No	No
2019	"Bloom" (피어나)	Astro	All Light	Yes	Yes	No
2020	"One & Only"	Astro	Non-album single	Yes	Yes	No
2021	"Gemini" (별비)	Astro	All Yours	Yes	Yes	Yes
2021	"Sunset Sky" (노을그림)	Astro	Switch On	Yes	Yes	No
2022	"Light The Sky" (하늘빛)	Astro	Drive to the Starry Road	Yes	Yes	No
2022	"Story"	Himself	Drive to the Starry Road	Yes	No	No

=== As Kim Myung-jun of Super Five ===
Title	Year	Peak chart positions	Album	Ref.
Title	Year	KOR	Album	Ref.
"Hello" (잘 될 거야)	2020	— (Note: "Hello" did not enter Gaon Digital Chart, but peaked at number 11 on Gaon BGM Chart.)	Non-album single	
"All Eyes on Me" (시선고정)	2020	— (Note: "All Eyes on Me" did not enter Gaon Digital Chart, but peaked at number 20 on Gaon Mobile Chart.)	Non-album single	
"Tearful Rain" (눈물비)	2020	—	Hello Goodbye Concert	
"—" denotes a recording that did not chart or was not released in that territory

== Filmography ==
=== Web series ===
Year	Title	Role	Notes	Ref.
2015	To be Continued	Himself		
2016	My Romantic Some Recipe		Cameo (Episode 6)	
2017	Sweet Revenge	Himself		
2019	Soul Plate	Angel Raoniel		
2021	Find Me If You Can	Seol Yoo Hwan		

=== Television shows ===
Year	Title	Role	Notes	Ref.
2019	Gotta Go to Know	Main cast		
2019	Go Together Travel Alone	Main cast		
2019	King of Mask Singer	Contestant (Chauffeur)	Episode 213–214	
2020	Favorite Entertainment	Regular member	Super Five	
2021	Fact iN Star	MC		
2021	Godiva Show	Panelist		

=== Web shows ===
Year	Title	Role	Notes	Ref.
2019	Insane Quiz Show	Main cast	Season 2	
2019	Blanket Kick at Night	MC		

== Theater ==
Year	Title	Role	Ref.
2020	Everybody's Talking About Jamie	Jamie	
2021–2022	Jack the Ripper	Daniel	
2023–2024	Winter Wanderer	Han Min-woo	
2024	Zorro: Actor Musician	Zorro	

== Awards and nominations ==
Name of the award ceremony, year presented, category, nominee of the award, and the result of the nomination
Award ceremony	Year	Category	Nominee / Work	Result	Ref.
Seoul Music Awards	2022	Trot Award	MJ	Nominated	
Seoul Webfest Film Festival	2022	Best Supporting Actor	Find Me If You Can	Nominated	
Asia Webfest Awards	2022	Best Supporting Actor	Find Me If You Can	Won	
