= Summer Vibes =

EP by Astro
- Released: July 1, 2016
- Recorded: 2016
- Genre: K-pop; dance; ballad
- Language: Korean
- Label: Fantagio Music; Interpark

Astro chronology
Spring Up (2016)	Summer Vibes (2016)	Autumn Story (2016)

Singles from Summer Vibes
- 1. "Breathless" Released: July 1, 2016

Music video
- "Breathless" on YouTube

Summer Vibes is the second extended play by South Korean boy band Astro. It was released by Fantagio Music on July 1, 2016, and distributed by Interpark. The EP contains 6 tracks including the lead single "Breathless".

== Background and release ==
In June 2016, Fantagio Music reveals details for the second EP by rookie boy-group, Astro. The EP is called Summer Vibes, with the lead single titled "Breathless". It was also revealed that Astro collaborated with the same composers who produced the tracks for their debut album.

"Breathless" is a refreshing song with a clear and addictive melody. It is also described as a breezy, synth-pop track that continues the feel-good vibes from their debut single "Hide & Seek".

The music video for "Breathless" was also released on July 1, featuring I.O.I member and label-mate, Choi Yoo-jung. The first half of the music video is filmed in Jeongdongjin Beach Park, while the second half is filmed in a forest in Namyangju. It shows the boys enjoying summer activities, as they appear to be human incarnations of soda bottles of the lead star.

== Track listing ==
No.	Title	Lyrics	Music	Arrangement	Length
1.	"Fireworks" (불꽃놀이)	Seo Young-bae; Park Woo-sang; JinJin; Rocky	Seo Young-bae; Park Woo-sang	Seo Young-bae; Park Woo-sang	3:18
2.	"Breathless" (숨가빠)	Iggy Young-bae; JinJin; Rocky	Iggy Young-bae	Iggy Young-bae	3:19
3.	"Growing Pains" (성장통)	Iggy Young-bae; JinJin; Rocky	Iggy Young-bae	Iggy Young-bae	3:44
4.	"Polaris" (북극성)	Park Woo-sang; JinJin; Rocky	Park Woo-sang	Park Woo-sang	3:21
5.	"My Style" (내 멋대로)	Iggy Young-bae; JinJin; Rocky	Iggy Young-bae	Iggy Young-bae	3:30
6.	"Breathless" (숨가빠) (Acoustic version)	Iggy Young-bae; JinJin; Rocky	Iggy Young-bae	Young	3:25
Total length:					20:37

== Charts ==
=== Weekly ===
Chart (2016)	Peak position
South Korean Albums (Gaon)	4
US World Albums (Billboard)	6

=== Monthly ===
Chart (2016)	Peak position
South Korean Albums (Gaon)	8

=== Year-end ===
Chart (2016)	Peak position
South Korean Albums (Gaon)	81

== Sales and certifications ==
Chart	Amount
Gaon Charts	29,706+

== Release history ==
Region	Date	Format	Label
South Korea	July 1, 2016	CD, digital download, streaming	Fantagio Music, Interpark
Various	July 1, 2016	Digital download, streaming	Fantagio Music, Interpark
