= Autumn Story (EP) =

EP by Astro
- Released: November 10, 2016
- Recorded: 2016
- Genres: K-pop; dance; ballad
- Language: Korean
- Labels: Fantagio Music; Interpark

Astro chronology
Summer Vibes (2016)	Autumn Story (2016)	Winter Dream (2017)

Singles from Autumn Story
- 1. "Confession" Released: October 11, 2016

Music video
- "Confession" on YouTube

Autumn Story is the third extended play by South Korean boy band Astro. It was released by Fantagio Music on November 10, 2016 and distributed by Interpark. The EP contains 5 tracks, including the lead single, "Confession". The hidden track, called "Confession talk (고백 Talk)" is an audio message from the group members. The album is available in two versions: Red and Orange. The Red version of the album features MJ, Moonbin, and Sanha talking on the confession, while the Orange version has JinJin, Cha Eun-woo, and Rocky talking on the confession.

== Track listing ==
No.	Title	Lyrics	Music	Arrangement	Length
1.	"Lonely"	Iggy Young-bae; JinJin; Rocky	Iggy Young-bae	Iggy Young-bae	3:22
2.	"Confession" (고백)	Iggy Young-bae; JinJin; Rocky	Iggy Young-bae	Iggy Young-bae	3:05
3.	"Your Love" (사랑이)	Lee Hoo-sang; Mingki; JinJin; Rocky	Lee Hoo-sang; Mingki	Lee Hoo-sang; Mingki	3:48
4.	"Colored" (물들어)	Park Woo-sang; JinJin; Rocky	Park Woo-sang	Park Woo-sang	3:10
5.	"Star" (별)	Iggy Young-bae; JinJin; Rocky	Iggy Young-bae	Iggy Young-bae	3:15
6.	"Confession Talk" (고백 Talk) (CD Only) [Red Version/Orange Version])
Total length:					20:37

== Charts ==
=== Weekly ===
Chart (2016)	Peak position
South Korean Albums (Gaon Chart)	6
US World Albums (Billboard Chart)	15

=== Monthly ===
Chart (2016)	Peak position
South Korean Albums (Gaon Chart)	12

=== Year-end ===
Chart (2016)	Peak position
South Korean Albums (Gaon Chart)	51

== Sales and certifications ==
Chart	Amount
Gaon Charts	57,524+

== Release history ==
Region	Date	Format	Label
South Korea	November 10, 2016	CD, digital download, streaming	Fantagio Music, Interpark
Various	November 10, 2016	Digital download, streaming	Fantagio Music, Interpark
