= Rocky (singer) =

South Korean rapper and singer (born 1999)

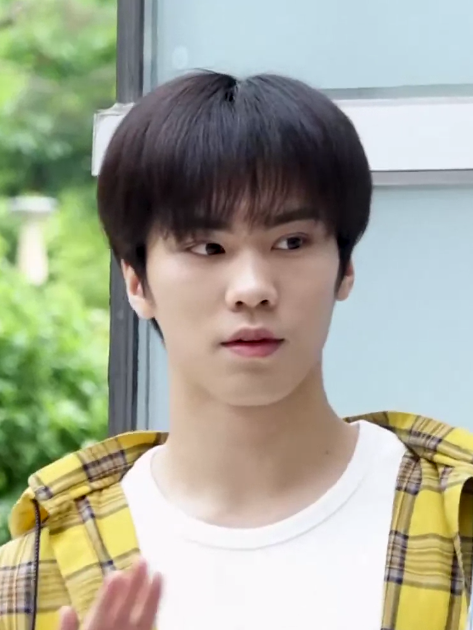
- Rocky in 2018
- Born: Park Min-hyuk; February 25, 1999 (age 27); Jinju, South Gyeongsang, South Korea
- Education: Hanlim Multi Art School
- Occupations: Rapper; singer; songwriter; actor
- Organization: Wonijin
- Musical career
- Genre: K-pop
- Instrument: Vocals
- Years active: 2015–present
- Labels: Fantagio; Wonijin
- Formerly of: Astro; Jinjin & Rocky

Korean name
- Hangul: 박민혁
- RR: Bak Minhyeok
- MR: Pak Minhyŏk

Park Min-hyuk (Korean: 박민혁; born February 25, 1999), known professionally as Rocky (라키), is a South Korean rapper, singer-songwriter, actor and entrepreneur. He is a former member of the South Korean boy group Astro and its sub-unit Jinjin & Rocky. In 2023, he established and became the CEO of his own agency, Wonijin Entertainment, and debuted as a solo artist with the extended play (EP) Rockyst. Park made his acting debut in the web series To Be Continued (2015) and later gained recognition for his role in Broke Rookie Star (2022), for which he received multiple awards. He also starred in the Korean adaptation of the musical The Three Musketeers (2022).

== Early life and education ==
Rocky was born on February 25, 1999, in Jinju, South Gyeongsang Province, South Korea. He attended and graduated from Hanlim Multi Art School with a focus on Practical Music.

He has a younger brother, Jeonggeun, who is a member of the boy group Haww under Biscuit Entertainment.

== Career ==
=== 2010–2015: Pre-debut activities ===
In 2010, in the fifth grade of elementary school, Rocky participated in the audition for the musical Billy Elliot. In the same year, he became a trainee under Fantagio Music.

Rocky was a contestant on Korea's Got Talent in 2011. He was the first trainee introduced in Fantagio's i-Teen project, performing at the Lotte World Rising Star Concert. Before their debut, Rocky along with the other five members of Astro starred in the web series To Be Continued.

=== 2016–2018: Debut with Astro and early solo activities ===
Rocky debuted as part of the six-member boy group Astro on February 23, 2016, as a dancer and rapper of the group. On August 24, 2016, Rocky appeared in an episode of Mnet's Hit the Stage where he portrayed The Mask. Rocky received praise from the judges, noting his expressions and movements as a perfect portrayal of the character.

On November 5, 2018, after four rounds of battle in 1theK's Dance War, Rocky was revealed to be Purple23 and placed second in the dance battle competition. On November 30, 2018, Fantagio Music released the digital single "STAR" which is a collaboration between Rocky and singer-songwriter Chawoo. "STAR" was later included in the FM201.8-11Hz which was released on December 13, 2018.

During Astro's second Astroad to Seoul "Starlight" concert which was held on December 22–23, 2018, Rocky performed his first solo song "Have a Good Day". It was included in the DVD of the concert which was released in June 2019.

=== 2019–2021: Solo activities and acting debut ===
In 2019, Rocky self-composed one of the tracks from Astro's sixth EP, Blue Flame, titled "When the Wind Blows".

Rocky was also one of the composers for the group's special single "No I don’t" which was released in June 2020. On June 24, 2020, Rocky was announced to be the solo MC for the Chinese Korean Wave Program Idol Coming to Work. On September 29, 2020, Rocky's first OST entitled "Shiny Blue" was released for the web series Dok Go Bin Is Updating.

On April 5, 2021, his composition entitled "Our Spring" was released as a track in Astro's second full studio album — All Yours. On May 23, 2021, Rocky's self-produced music video for "Our Spring" was released. Rocky was credited as a lyricist and composer for "7Days Tension" by the girl group Weeekly.

In October 2021, Rocky began his acting career with roles in the web dramas Hyangjeon of Youth (as a modern Lee Mongryong) and Find Me If You Can. On December 27, 2021, it was confirmed that Rocky and Jinjin would debut as Astro's second sub-unit Jinjin & Rocky in January 2022.

=== 2022–2023: Jinjin & Rocky sub-unit, acting and departure from Astro ===
On January 17, Rocky debuted as part of the duo Jinjin & Rocky with the EP Restore. On March 28, it was reported that Rocky would sing the national anthem for the opening games of the 22nd Season of the KBO League happening on April 2, 2022, at the Changwon NC Park.

On May 16, Rocky's solo ballad song "S#1" was released as part of Astro's third full studio album — Drive to the Starry Road. Rocky's second OST entitled "Over That" was released for the web drama Broke Rookie Star in which he also starred as "Whee-yeon", a solo singer who joined a rising idol group called X-PIERS. On May 29, G-Market released a teaser for its new web series called X: SSG where Rocky played the role of "Woo-ju" together with his bandmate Jinjin, Monsta X Hyungwon, Minhyuk, Joohoney, AB6IX Daehwi, Jeon Woong, and Apink Yoon Bo-mi. The web series was released on G-Market's YouTube Channel on June 5, 2022. Rocky played the role of D'Artagnan in the Korean remake of the musical The Three Musketeers. The show's run started on September 16, 2022, at the Universal Art Center in Seoul.

On August 20, Rocky won his first Best Actor award for the web series Broke Rookie Star in the international web festival Seoul Webfest 2022. On November 6, Rocky won his second Best Actor award for the same web series at the LA Webfest 2022, the largest film festival for web dramas in the world. Broke Rookie Star also won Best Web Series of All Genres award. According to the executive chairman of the festival organization committee, this is the first time for a Korean web series to bag the grand prize at the film festival since its launch in 2009. On December 30, 2022, Rocky won his third Best Actor award at the 6th Asia Web Awards 2022 for his lead role in Broke Rookie Star.

Rocky participated in writing, composing, and choreographing his brother's band's debut song called "Wanna Be Love", which was released on February 23, 2023. On February 28, 2023, Fantagio confirmed that Rocky decided not to renew his contract and left both the agency and the group. On October 26, Rocky reportedly set up his own agency called One Fine Day Entertainment in August.

=== 2023–present: Solo career under Wonijin Entertainment ===
On November 22, Rocky released his debut extended play Rockyst alongside its lead single "Lucky Rocky".

On June 14, 2024, it was announced that Rocky will release his second EP Blank on June 27, 2024. On June 18, Rocky released a promotion scheduler for the album. On June 27, Rocky released his second extended play Blank alongside its lead single "Jealousy". On November 22, Rocky released the digital single "On My Mind" to celebrate the first anniversary of his solo debut.

On March 18, 2025, Rocky released the digital single "Ba Ba Bye", a sweet mid-tempo R&B song for which he participated in writing the lyrics and composing the music.

In April 2026, Rocky was appointed general director of Stage OnK, a global K-pop talent development platform operated by KBS Sports World and PH E&M. In this role, he leads educational initiatives and serves as lead instructor for international students.

In June 2026, Rocky performed in Italy for the first time as a guest artist at the Gardaland K-Pop Festival. In an interview with Vanity Fair Italia, he reflected on the challenges of his solo career, explaining that assuming full responsibility for every decision — from music production and concepts to strategic direction — has been the biggest challenge. He stated that although he initially felt fear, he has never regretted the decision and is proud of being able to define his own style and message more clearly. He described Rockyst as the album in which he first presented his true self and pure artistic energy without any externally imposed image. Rocky also expressed his desire to collaborate with Bruno Mars and noted that dance remains his greatest comfort zone, while songwriting is the area where he still feels most vulnerable.

== Personal life ==
On October 31, 2022, the agency confirmed that Rocky is in a relationship with actress Park Bo-yeon. However, Park's agency dismissed the rumors as false earlier the same day, saying, "We confirmed with actor Park that the two are good colleagues ever since working together on Find Me if You Can last year."

== Discography ==
=== Extended plays ===
List of extended plays, showing selected details, selected chart positions, and sales figures
Title	Details	Peak chart positions	Sales
Title	Details	KOR	Sales
Rockyst	Released: November 22, 2023; Label: One Fine Day; Formats: CD, digital download, streaming	18	KOR: 15,222
Blank	Released: June 27, 2024; Label: One Fine Day; Formats: CD, digital download, streaming	14	KOR: 25,952

=== Singles ===
Title	Year	Peak chart positions	Album
Title	Year	KOR	Album
As lead artist
"Have a Good Day" (좋은 하루 되세요)	2019	—	The 2nd Astroad to Seoul DVD
"Complete Me"	2022	— (Note: "Complete Me" did not enter the Gaon Digital Chart, but appeared at number 165 on the component Download Chart.)	Restore
"CPR"	2022	— (Note: "CPR" did not enter the Gaon Digital Chart, but appeared at number 174 on the component Download Chart.)	Restore
"S#1."	2022	— (Note: "S#1." did not enter the Gaon Digital Chart, but appeared at number 67 on the component Download Chart.)	Drive to the Starry Road
"Lucky Rocky"	2023	— (Note: "Lucky Rocky" did not enter the Circle Digital Chart, but appeared at number 16 on the component Download Chart.)	Rockyst
"Jealousy"	2024	— (Note: "Jealousy" did not enter the Circle Digital Chart, but appeared at number 49 on the component Download Chart.)	Blank
"On My Mind"	2024	— (Note: "On My Mind" did not enter the Circle Digital Chart, but appeared at number 40 on the component Download Chart.)	Non-album singles
"Ba Ba Bye"	2025	—	Non-album singles
"Forever And Ever"	2025	—	Non-album singles
"Fake It"	2026	—	Unsaid
Collaborations
"Star" (별) (with Chawoo)	2018	—	FM201.8-11Hz
“Memory of the Moon” (꿈속의 문) (with Astro, Viviz, I.M, Seungkwan, Bang Chan, Moon Sua, Minhyuk, Kihyun, Hoshi, Wonwoo, Mingyu, Chani, DK, Hello Gloom, Choi Yoo Jung, Kim Do Yeon	2025	—	
Soundtrack appearances
"Shiny Blue" (내 마음은 하늘)	2020	—	Dok Go Bin Is Updating OST
"Over That"	2022	—	Broke Rookie Star OST
"—" denotes a recording that did not chart

=== Composition credits ===
All credits are listed under the Korea Music Copyright Association unless otherwise stated.

Title	Year	Artist	Album	Rap-Making	Lyricist	Composer	Arranger
"Hide & Seek"	2016	Astro	Spring Up	Yes	No	No	No
"Innocent love" (고백)	2016	Astro	Spring Up	Yes	No	No	No
"Morning call"	2016	Astro	Spring Up	Yes	No	No	No
"Cat's eye"	2016	Astro	Spring Up	Yes	No	No	No
"Lonely"	2016	Astro	Autumn Story	Yes	No	No	No
"Confession" (고백)	2016	Astro	Autumn Story	Yes	No	No	No
"Your Love" (사랑이)	2016	Astro	Autumn Story	Yes	No	No	No
"Colored" (물들어)	2016	Astro	Autumn Story	Yes	No	No	No
"Star" (별)	2016	Astro	Autumn Story	Yes	No	No	No
"Should've Held On" (붙잡았어야 해)	2017	Astro	Winter Dream	Yes	Yes	No	No
"Cotton Candy"	2017	Astro	Winter Dream	Yes	Yes	No	No
"You & Me"	2017	Astro	Winter Dream	Yes	Yes	No	No
"Dreams Come True"	2017	Astro	Dream Part.01	Yes	No	No	No
"Baby"	2017	Astro	Dream Part.01	Yes	No	No	No
"You Smile" (니가 웃잖아)	2017	Astro	Dream Part.01	Yes	No	No	No
"Because It's You (너라서)	2017	Astro	Dream Part.01	Yes	No	No	No
"Dream Night"	2017	Astro	Dream Part.01	Yes	No	No	No
"I'll Be There"	2017	Astro	Dream Part.01	Yes	No	No	No
"Lie" (다 거짓말)	2017	Astro	Dream Part.01	Yes	No	No	No
"Every Minute"	2017	Astro	Dream Part.01	Yes	No	No	No
"With You"	2017	Astro	Dream Part.02	Yes	No	No	No
"Crazy Sexy Cool" (니가 불어와)	2017	Astro	Dream Part.02	Yes	No	No	No
"Butterfly"	2017	Astro	Dream Part.02	Yes	No	No	No
"Better With You" (어느새 우린)	2017	Astro	Dream Part.02	Yes	No	No	No
"By Your Side"	2018	Astro	Rise Up	Yes	Yes	No	No
"Call Out"	2018	Astro	Rise Up	Yes	No	No	No
"Real Love"	2018	Astro	Rise Up	Yes	No	No	No
"All I Want"	2018	Astro, Hello Venus, Weki Meki	FM201.8-11HZ	Yes	No	No	No
"Star"	2018	Chawoo, Rocky	FM201.8-11HZ	Yes	No	No	No
"Starry Sky"	2019	Astro	All Light	Yes	No	No	No
"All Night" (전화해)	2019	Astro	All Light	Yes	No	No	No
"Moonwalk"	2019	Astro	All Light	Yes	No	No	No
"Treasure"	2019	Astro	All Light	Yes	No	No	No
"1 In A Million"	2019	Astro	All Light	Yes	No	No	No
"Love Wheel"	2019	Astro	All Light	Yes	No	No	No
"Heart Brew Love"	2019	Astro	All Light	Yes	No	No	No
"Merry-Go-Round"	2019	Astro	All Light	Yes	Yes	No	No
"Bloom" (피어나)	2019	Astro	All Light	Yes	No	No	No
"Have A Good Day" (좋은 하루 되세요)	2019	Rocky	ASTRO the 2nd ASTROAD to Seoul [STAR LIGHT]	Yes	Yes	Yes	No
"Blue Flame"	2019	Astro	Blue Flame	Yes	No	No	No
"All About You" {다야}	2019	Astro	Blue Flame	Yes	No	No	No
"When The Wind Blows" (찬바람 불 때면)	2019	Astro	Blue Flame	Yes	Yes	Yes	No
"You're My World"	2019	Astro	Blue Flame	Yes	No	No	No
"One & Only"	2020	Astro	Special single album One & Only	Yes	Yes	Yes	No
"Knock" (널 찾아가)	2020	Astro	Gateway	Yes	No	No	No
"When You Call My Name" (내 이름을 부를 때)	2020	Astro	Gateway	Yes	No	No	No
"Somebody Like"	2020	Astro	Gateway	Yes	No	No	No
"We Still"	2020	Astro	Gateway	Yes	No	No	No
"12 Hours" (12시간)	2020	Astro	Gateway	Yes	No	No	No
"Lights On" (빛이 돼줄게)	2020	Astro	Gateway	Yes	No	No	No
"No, I Don't" (아니 그래)	2020	Astro	Non-album single	Yes	Yes	Yes	Yes
"We Still (Be With U)"	2020	Astro	Non-album single	Yes	No	No	No
"Dear My Universe"	2021	Astro	All Yours	Yes	No	No	No
"One"	2021	Astro	All Yours	Yes	No	No	No
"SNS"	2021	Astro	All Yours	Yes	No	No	No
"All Good"	2021	Astro	All Yours	Yes	No	No	No
"All Stars"	2021	Astro	All Yours	Yes	No	No	No
"Our Spring" (우리의 계절)	2021	Astro	All Yours	Yes	Yes	Yes	Yes
"Stardust"	2021	Astro	All Yours	Yes	No	No	No
"Gemini" (별비)	2021	Astro	All Yours	Yes	No	No	No
"7days Tension" (텐션업)	2021	Weeekly	Non-album single	No	Yes	No	No
"After Midnight"	2021	Astro	Switch On	Yes	No	No	No
"Sunset Sky"	2021	Astro	Switch On	Yes	No	No	No
"My Zone"	2021	Astro	Switch On	Yes	No	No	No
"Don't Worry"	2021	Astro	Switch On	Yes	Yes	Yes	No
"Alive"	2021	Astro	Non-album single	Yes	No	No	No
"Just Breath"	2022	Jinjin & Rocky	Restore	Yes	Yes	Yes	No
"Complete Me"	2022	Jinjin & Rocky	Restore	Yes	Yes	Yes	No
"CPR"	2022	Jinjin & Rocky	Restore	-	Yes	Yes	No
"Candy Sugar Pop"	2022	Astro	Drive to the Starry Road	Yes	No	No	No
"Something Something"	2022	Astro	Drive to the Starry Road	Yes	No	No	No
"More"	2022	Astro	Drive to the Starry Road	Yes	No	No	No
"Light the Sky"	2022	Astro	Drive to the Starry Road	Yes	No	No	No
"S#1"	2022	Rocky	Drive to the Starry Road	Yes	Yes	Yes	No
"Like Stars"	2022	Astro	Drive to the Starry Road	Yes	No	No	No
"U&Iverse"	2022	Astro	Non-album single	Yes	Yes	No	No
"Wanna Be Love"	2023	HAWW	How R U	No	Yes	Yes	No
"Music Is My life"	2023	Rocky	Rockyst	-	Yes	Yes	No
"Lucky Rocky"	2023	Rocky	Rockyst	-	Yes	Yes	No
"Your Halley"	2023	Rocky	Rockyst	-	Yes	Yes	No
"Chameleon"	2023	Rocky	Rockyst	-	Yes	Yes	No
"Yes or No"	2023	Rocky	Rockyst	-	Yes	Yes	No
"Find Me"	2023	Rocky	Rockyst	-	Yes	Yes	No

== Filmography ==
=== Television series ===
Year	Title	Role	Notes	Ref.
2015	Persevere, Goo Hae-Ra		Cameo	

=== Web series ===
Year	Title	Role	Notes	Ref.
2015	To be Continued	Himself		
2016	My Romantic Some Recipe		Cameo (Episode 6)	
2017	Sweet Revenge	Himself	Cameo	
2019	Soul Plate	Angel Rumiel		
2021	Find Me If You Can	Choi Jeong-sang		
2021	Hyangjeon of Youth	Lee Mong-ryong		
2022	Broke Rookie Star	Whee-yeon		

=== Television shows ===
Year	Title	Role	Notes	Ref.
2011	Korea's Got Talent	Contestant		
2016	Hit the Stage	Contestant	Episode 5–6	
2020–2022	Idol Coming to Work	Host		
2021	King of Mask Singer	Contestant	Episode 305–306	

=== Web shows ===
Year	Title	Role	Ref.
2018	Dance War	Contestant	
2021	Work Hard Play Hard	Assistant Manager	
2021	Ready, Set, CAST	Himself	
2021	X: Endline, new beginning	Woo-ju	
2022	X: SSG	Woo-ju	

== Theater ==
Year	Title	Role	Ref.
2022	The Three Musketeers	D'Artagnan	
2026	Romeo and Juliet	Romeo	

== Awards and nominations ==
Name of the award ceremony, year presented, category, nominee of the award, and the result of the nomination
Award ceremony	Year	Category	Nominee / Work	Result	Ref.
Asia Web Awards	2022	Best Actor	Broke Rookie Star	Won	
Immortal Songs	2024	King of 80's	Rocky	Won	
Immortal Songs	2024	King of Trot	Rocky	Won	
Immortal Songs	2024	King of Kings	Rocky	Won	
Los Angeles Web Series Festival	2022	Best Actor	Broke Rookie Star	Won	
Seoul Webfest Film Festival	2022	Best Actor	Broke Rookie Star	Won	
