= All Yours (Astro album) =

- Digital and You version cover

Studio album by Astro
- Released: April 5, 2021
- Recorded: 2021
- Genre: K-pop
- Length: 33:59
- Labels: Fantagio; Kakao
- Producers: Kim Woo-sang; Skinner Box; $UN; Royaldive; Val Del Prete; 153/Joombas; Willie Weeks; Flow Blow; Louis Frick Sveen; Albin Nordqvist; Jomalxne; iHwak; Sam Carter; Nomasgood; Jinjin (Astro); The Proof; Harold Philippon; Obros; Rocky (Astro); X&; Park Sang Min; Samin; MJ (Astro)

Astro chronology
Gateway (2020)	All Yours (2021)	Switch On (2021)

Singles from All Yours
- 1. "One" Released: April 5, 2021

All Yours is the second Korean-language studio album by South Korean boy band Astro. It was released on April 5, 2021, through Fantagio Music and Kakao Entertainment. All Yours was certified platinum by the KMCA for more than 250,000 copies sold of the album.

== Track listing ==
All Yours track listing
No.	Title	Lyrics	Music	Arrangement	Length
1.	"Dear My Universe"	Kim Woo-sang; Jinjin; Rocky; SKINNER BOX	Kim Woo-sang; SKINNER BOX	Kim Woo-sang; SKINNER BOX	3:02
2.	"Butterfly Effect"	Hwang Yu-bin; Jinjin	$UN; ROYAL DIVE		3:34
3.	"One"	Ellie Suh (153/Joombas); Lee Jae Ni (Flying Lab); Val Del Prete; JJ Evans (153/Joombas); Jinjin; Rocky	Val Del Prete; JJ Evans; (153/Joombas); Willie Weeks		3:16
4.	"Someone Else (Sung by Jinjin, Moonbin & MJ)"	Penomeco; Damian	Flow Blow; Louise Frick Sveen; Albin Nordqvist		3:17
5.	"SNS (Sung by Eunwoo, Sanha & Rocky)"	ROYAL DIVE; JOMALXNE; iHwak; Rocky	ROYAL DIVE; JOMALXNE; iHwak		3:03
6.	"All Good"	Kim Chan (Flying Lab); Chaoreuda (Flying Lab); Joo Seo-jin (Flying Lab); Sam Carter; Jinjin; Rocky	Sam Carter; Nomasgood; Jinjin		3:25
7.	"All Stars"	Hwang Eun-bit (Flying Lab); Hwa Im-hyeon (Flying Lab); ZUPITER (Flying Lab); Oh Ye-jin (Flying Lab); Jeong Chae-yeon (Flying Lab); Jinjin; Rocky	The Proof; Harold Philippon		2:59
8.	"Our Spring" (우리의 계절)	OBROS; Nomasgood; Jinjin; Rocky	OBROS; Nomasgood; Rocky		3:47
9.	"Stardust"	Rick Bridges (X&); Kiggen(X&); Jinjin; Rocky	Kiggen (X&); Rick Bridges (X&)		3:26
10.	"Gemini" (별비)	Park Sang-min; SAMIN; MJ; Jinjin; Rocky	Park Sang-min; SAMIN; MJ		4:10
Total length:					33:59

== Charts ==
=== Weekly charts ===
Weekly chart performance for All Yours
Chart (2021)	Peak position
Japanese Albums (Oricon)	1
South Korean Albums (Gaon)	1

=== Year-end charts ===
Year-end chart performance for All Yours
Chart (2021)	Position
South Korean Albums (Gaon)	38

== Accolades ==
Music program awards
Song	Program	Network	Date	Ref.
"One”	The Show	SBS MTV	April 13, 2021	
"One”	Show Champion	MBC M	April 14, 2021	
"One”	M Countdown	Mnet	April 15, 2021	

== See also ==
- List of Gaon Album Chart number ones of 2021

== Release history ==
Release formats for Hot Sauce
Region	Date	Format	Distributor	Ref.
Various	April 5, 2021	Digital download	Fantagio	
South Korea	April 5, 2021	Digital download	Fantagio	
South Korea	April 5, 2021	CD	Fantagio; Kakao Entertainment	
