= Dream Part.01 =

- Digital and "Day" version cover

EP by Astro
- Released: May 29, 2017
- Recorded: 2017
- Genre: K-pop; Dance-pop; R&B
- Length: 27:07
- Label: Fantagio; Interpark

Astro chronology
Winter Dream (2017)	Dream Part.01 (2017)	Dream Part.02 (2017)

Singles from Dream Part.01
- 1. "Baby" Released: May 29, 2017

Music video
- "Baby" on YouTube

Dream Part.01 is the fourth extended play by South Korean boy band Astro. It was released by Fantagio Music on May 29, 2017, and distributed by Interpark. The EP contains eight tracks including the lead single "Baby".

== Track listing ==
No.	Title	Lyrics	Music	Arrangement	Length
1.	"Dreams Come True"	Iggy Young-bae; JinJin; Rocky	Iggy Young-bae	Iggy Young-bae	3:32
2.	"Baby"	Glory Face (Full8loom); Jinri (Full8loom); JinJin; Rocky	CODE 9	CODE 9	3:22
3.	"You Smile (니가 웃잖아)"	Jin-ri (Full8loom); Glory Face (Full8loom); JinJin; Rocky	Glory Face (Full8loom); Jinri (Full8loom)	Glory Face (Full8loom)	3:27
4.	"Because It's You (너라서)"	Jin-ri (Full8loom); JinJin; Rocky	Glory Face (Full8loom); Jinri (Full8loom)	Glory Face (Full8loom)	3:42
5.	"Dream Night"	OBROS; JinJin; Rocky	OBROS; CHKmate	OBROS; CHKmate	3:15
6.	"I'll Be There"	OBROS; OBROS2; mia; JinJin; Rocky	OBROS; OBROS2	OBROS	3:06
7.	"Lie (다 거짓말)"	Iggy Young-bae; JinJin; Rocky	Iggy Young-bae	Iggy Young-bae	3:21
8.	"Every Minute"	Seo Ji-eum; JinJin; Rocky	Stephan Elfgren; Chris Meyer	Stephen Elfgren	3:22
Total length:					27:07

== Charts ==
=== Weekly charts ===
Chart (2017)	Peak position
South Korean Albums (Gaon Chart)	1

=== Monthly charts ===
Chart (2017)	Peak position
South Korean Albums (Gaon Chart)	3

=== Year-end charts ===
Chart (2017)	Peak position
South Korean Albums (Gaon Chart)	41

== Release history ==
Region	Date	Format	Label
South Korea	May 29, 2017	CD, digital download, streaming	Fantagio Music, Interpark
Various	May 29, 2017	Digital download, streaming	Fantagio Music, Interpark
