= Switch On =

- Digital and On version cover

EP by Astro
- Released: August 2, 2021
- Genre: K-pop
- Length: 20:17
- Labels: Fantagio Music; Kakao

Astro chronology
All Yours (2021)	Switch On (2021)	Drive to the Starry Road (2022)

Singles from Switch On
- 1. "After Midnight" Released: August 2, 2021

Switch On is the eighth extended play by South Korean boy group Astro. It was released on August 2, 2021, by Fantagio Music and distributed by Kakao Entertainment. The album contains six songs including the lead single "After Midnight".

== Track listing ==
Switch On track listing
No.	Title	Lyrics	Music	Arrangement	Length
1.	"After Midnight"	Cha Eun-woo (Astro); Kim Yeon-seo; Jinjin (Astro); Rocky (Astro); Kim Young-jin	Alysa; Carlyle Fernandes; Sean Michael Alexander; Sqvare	Carlyle Fernandes; Alysa	3:10
2.	"Footprint" (발자국)	Moonbin (Astro); Su Kyung (Flying Lab)	Nomasgood; Vendors (San); Joliker Leandre	Nomasgood	3:12
3.	"Waterfall"	Mi Seong (Music Cube); Jinjin (Astro); Kim Su-jeong (Music Cube)	Alysa; Phil Schwan; Sean Michael Alexander; Sqvare	Alysa; Phil Schwan	4:02
4.	"Sunset Sky" (노을 그림)	MJ (Astro); Park Sang-min; Rocky (Astro); Jinjin (Astro)	MJ (Astro); Park Sang-min; Park Yong-hyun; Jabong; Moses Sun	Park Yong-hyun	3:20
5.	"My Zone"	Jinjin (Astro); Rocky (Astro); Lee Jae-ni (Flying Lab)	Sam Carter; Nomasgood; Jinjin (Astro); Yoon San-ha (Astro)	Nomasgood	3:21
6.	"Don't Worry"	Cha Eun-woo (Astro); Jinjin (Astro); Rocky (Astro); Obros; Obros2	Rocky (Astro); Obros; Obros2; Cha Eun-woo (Astro); Sean Oh; Yuki	Obros; Sean Oh	3:21
Total length:					20:17

== Charts ==
=== Weekly charts ===
Weekly chart performance for Switch On
Chart (2021)	Peak position
Japanese Albums (Oricon)	2
South Korean Albums (Gaon)	1

=== Year-end charts ===
Year-end chart performance for Switch On
Chart (2021)	Position
South Korean Albums (Gaon)	45

== Accolades ==
2021 music program awards
Song	Program	Network	Date	Ref
"After Midnight"	The Show	SBS MTV	August 10, 2021	
"After Midnight"	Show Champion	MBC M	August 11, 2021	
"After Midnight"	Music Bank	KBS World	August 13, 2021	
"After Midnight"	Show! Music Core	MBC	August 14, 2021	

== Release history ==
Release formats for Switch On
Region	Date	Format	Distributor	Ref.
Various	August 2, 2021	Digital download; streaming	Fantagio	
South Korea	August 2, 2021	CD	Fantagio; Kakao Entertainment	

== See also ==
- List of Gaon Album Chart number ones of 2021
