= Dream Part.02 =

- Digital and "Wish" version cover

EP by Astro
- Released: November 1, 2017
- Recorded: 2017
- Genre: K-pop; Dance-pop; R&B
- Length: 17:28
- Label: Fantagio; Interpark

Astro chronology
Dream Part.01 (2017)	Dream Part.02 (2017)	Rise Up (2018)

Singles from Dream Part.02
- 1. "Crazy Sexy Cool" Released: November 1, 2017

Music video
- "Crazy Sexy Cool" on YouTube

Dream Part.02 is the fifth extended play by South Korean boy band Astro. It was released by Fantagio Music and distributed by Interpark on November 1, 2017. The EP contains five tracks, including the lead single, "Crazy Sexy Cool".

== Background and release ==
On October 16, 2017, Fantagio Music announced that Astro will make a comeback with their fifth EP using the name Dream Part.02 on November 1. On October 18, they released the first set of the concept photos for Dream Part.02. On October 20, the second set of the concept photos was released. On October 23 and 25, they released the album tracklist and preview respectively, revealing "Crazy Sexy Cool" as the title track. Five days later, on October 30, the music video teaser for "Crazy Sexy Cool" was released.

On November 1, they released Dream Part.02 along with the music video for "Crazy Sexy Cool".

== Track listing ==
No.	Title	Lyrics	Music	Arrangement	Length
1.	"With You"	Jin-ri (Full8loom); JinJin; Rocky	Glory Face (Full8loom); Jinri (Full8loom); Jake K	Glory Face (Full8loom); Jake K	3:26
2.	"Crazy Sexy Cool" (니가 불어와)	100% Seo-jeong; JinJin; Rocky	LDN Noise; Adrian McKinnon	LDN Noise; Adrian McKinnon	3:16
3.	"Butterfly"	Jeong Ho-hyeon (e.one); Choi Hyeon-jun (e.one); JinJin; Rocky	Jeong Ho-hyeon (e.one); Choi Hyeon-jun (e.one)	Jeong Ho-hyeon (e.one); Choi Hyeon-jun (e.one)	3:35
4.	"Run"	Jin-ri (Full8loom); JinJin; Rocky	Glory Face (Full8loom); Jinri (Full8loom)	Glory Face (Full8loom)	3:39
5.	"Better With You" (어느새 우린)	Iggy Young-bae; JinJin; Rocky	Iggy Young-bae	Iggy Young-bae	3:30
Total length:					17:26

== Charts ==
Weekly sales chart performance for Dream Part.02
Chart (2017)	Peak position
South Korean Albums (Gaon Chart)	2

Monthly sales chart performance for Dream Part.02
Chart (2017)	Peak position
South Korean Albums (Gaon Chart)	12

Year-end sales chart performance for Dream Part.02
Chart (2017)	Peak position
South Korean Albums (Gaon Chart)	75

== Release history ==
Region	Date	Format	Label
South Korea	November 1, 2017	CD; digital download; streaming	Fantagio Music, Interpark
Various	November 1, 2017	Digital download; streaming	Fantagio Music, Interpark
