= Sweet Revenge (South Korean TV series) =

2017–2018 South Korean web series

- Promotional poster
- Also known as: Revenge Note
- Hangul: 복수노트
- Lit.: Revenge Note
- RR: Boksunoteu
- MR: Poksunot'ŭ
- Genre: Coming of age; Revenge
- Written by: Han Sang-im; Kim Jong-seon
- Directed by: Seo Won-tae
- Starring: Kim Hyang-gi; Lomon; Cha Eun-woo
- Country of origin: South Korea
- Original language: Korean
- No. of seasons: 1
- No. of episodes: 11

Production
- Executive producers: Kang Gyoo-taek; Lee Jae-moon
- Camera setup: Single-camera
- Running time: 10-24 minutes
- Production companies: Blue Panda Mediatainment; Hidden Sequence

Original release
- Network: Oksusu; BTV
- Release: October 27, 2017 – January 5, 2018

Sweet Revenge (Korean: 복수노트; RR: Boksunoteu; lit. Revenge Note) is a South Korean web series starring Kim Hyang-gi, Lomon and Cha Eun-woo. Produced by Blue Panda Mediatainment and Hidden Sequence, it aired on Oksusu's Fridays at 10:00 (KST) from October 27, 2017, to January 5, 2018, and drew 11 million combined views. A sequel Sweet Revenge 2 aired from August 13 to October 9, 2018.

== Synopsis ==
Ho Goo-hee, a high schooler and self-proclaimed pushover, discovers a new application on her phone that offers to take revenge on anyone whose name she writes in it.

== Cast ==
=== Main ===
- Kim Hyang-gi as Ho Goo-hee
- Lomon as Shin Ji-hoon
- Kim Hwan-hee as Jung Deok-hee
- Cha Eun-woo as himself

=== Supporting ===
==== People around Goo-hee ====
- Park Mi-sun as Goo-hee's mother
- Lee Doo-il as Goo-hee's father
- Ji Gun-woo as Ho Goo-joon, Goo-hee's older brother
- Lee Si-woo as Goo-hee's ex-boyfriend

==== People around Deok-hee ====
- Park Kyung-lim as Deok-hee's mother

==== Students ====
- Ham Sung-min as Lee Kang-min
- Jo Ah-young as Goo-hee's friend
- Lee Jin-yi as Han Yu-ra
- Kim Hyun-seo as Yang Ah-joon
- Jo Chae-yoon as Yeo Ga-eun
- Lee Eun-saem as Lee So-eun
- Yoo In-soo as Choi Il-jin
- Cho Yi-hyun as Ye-ri
- Eun Hae-sung
- Oh Yoo-jin
- Mo Nan Hee

==== Teachers ====
- Tae In-ho
- Jeong Jeong-ah as Jeong Jeong-ah
- Hwang Tae-kwang as M. Choi (the Physical Education teacher)
- Kim San-ho as Eum Chi Hoon, the Music teacher

=== Special appearances ===
- Jung Eun-sung
- Astro

== Original soundtrack ==
Sweet Revenge OST

Soundtrack album by Various artists
- Released: 2018
- Genre: Soundtrack
- Languages: Korean; English
- Label: Yehyang Entertainment

Released on July 24, 2018
No.	Title	Lyrics	Music	Artist	Length
1.	"Sweet Revenge" (복수노트)	Ham Ye-chan, Yun A-seong	Yun A-seong, Kim Jin-soo	Chan Chan	2:38
2.	"I Always" (난 항상)	Yun A-seong, Kim Jin-soo	Yun A-seong, Kim Jin-soo	Lee Yoon Jin	3:39
Total length:					6:17
