= Gateway (EP) =

- Digital and Another World version cover

EP by Astro
- Released: May 4, 2020
- Genre: K-pop
- Length: 19:39
- Label: Fantagio Music; Kakao M

Astro chronology
| Blue Flame (2019) | Gateway (2020) | All Yours (2021) |

Singles from Gateway
- 1. "Knock" Released: May 4, 2020

Gateway is the seventh extended play by South Korean boy group Astro. It was released on May 4, 2020, by Fantagio Music and distributed by Kakao M. The album contains six songs including the lead single "Knock". This is their third number one album in South Korea.

== Reception ==
The group re-entered the Emerging Artists chart at number 49. Upon the release of Gateway, Billboard reported that the sextet gained 75,000 new YouTube subscribers, 24,000 new Twitter followers and 6,000 new Facebook page followers. The biggest music move Astro made was with new single "Knock" logging 312,000 on-demand US streams, in its first week available.

== Commercial performance ==
The album debuted atop the Gaon Album Chart for the week ending May 9, 2020. It also debuted at number 38 on Billboard Japan's Hot Albums for the week ending May 18, 2020, and at number 15 on Top Download Albums. It also debuted at number 3 on the Oricon Albums Chart with 11,459 copies sold and peaked at number 3 on the Oricon Combined Albums Chart.

== Track listing ==
Gateway track listing
| No. | Title | Lyrics | Music | Arrangement | Length |
|---|---|---|---|---|---|
| 1. | "Knock" (널 찾아가) | Isran; Giwon (Flying Lab); Summer Moon (Jam Factory); Jinjin (Astro); Rocky (Astro) | Brian U (The Hub); MarkAlong (The HUb); Noerio (The Hub); Charlotte Wilson; Frankie Day (The Hub); Chanti (The Hub); Ayu (The Hub); Makeumine; Rajan Muse | Brian U (The Hub); MarkAlong (The Hub | 3:13 |
| 2. | "When You Call My Name" (내 이름을 부를 때) | Coach & Sendo; Yuki; Jinjin (Astro); Rocky (Astro) | Coach & Sendo | Coach & Sendo | 3:29 |
| 3. | "Somebody Like" | MosPick; Jinjin (Astro); Rocky (South Korean singer); Rocky (Astro) | MosPick | MosPick | 3:07 |
| 4. | "We Still" | Ju Seo-jin (Flying Lab); Erik Lidbom; CR Kim; Kim Su-bin (Aiming); Jinjin (Astro); Rocky (Astro) | Erik Lidbom; CR Kim; Kim Su-bin (Aiming) | Erik Lidbom | 3:16 |
| 5. | "12 Hours" (12시간) | Mirror Boy; D.Ham; Hanmiru Moon; Jinjin (Astro); Rocky (Astro) | Mirror Boy; D.Ham; Hanmiru Moon | Mirror Boy; D.Ham; Hanmiru Moon | 3:10 |
| 6. | "Lights On" (빛이 돼줄게) | Jinjin (Astro); StarB ($mile); Orae; Rocky (Astro) | Jinjin (Astro); StarB ($mile); Orae | Jinjin (Astro); StarB ($mile); Orae | 3:24 |
| Total length: | | | | | 19:39 |

== Charts ==
Chart performance for Gateway
| Chart (2020) | Peak position |
|---|---|
| Japanese Albums (Oricon) | 3 |
| Japan Combined Albums (Oricon) | 3 |
| Japan Hot Albums (Billboard Japan) | 38 |
| Japan Top Download Albums (Billboard Japan) | 15 |
| South Korea (Gaon) | 1 |

== Accolades ==
Music program awards
| Song | Program | Date |
|---|---|---|
| "Knock" | Show Champion (MBC M) | May 13, 2020 |

== See also ==
- List of Gaon Album Chart number ones of 2020
