= Drive to the Starry Road =

- Digital cover

Studio album by Astro
- Released: May 16, 2022
- Genre: K-pop
- Length: 36:23
- Label: Fantagio Music

Astro chronology
Switch On (2021)	Drive to the Starry Road (2022)

Singles from Drive to the Starry Road
- 1. "Candy Sugar Pop" Released: May 16, 2022

Drive to the Starry Road is the third Korean-language studio album by South Korean boy band Astro, released on May 16, 2022, through Fantagio Music. It was released alongside the music video for the lead single "Candy Sugar Pop". The album debuted at number one on the Gaon Album Chart and number 10 on the Oricon Albums Chart. It was the group's last album to feature Rocky, who withdrew from the group on February 28, 2023, and Moonbin, who died on April 19, 2023.

== Commercial performance ==
Drive to the Starry Road topped the Gaon Retail Album Chart in its first week of release, selling 142,379 copies in retail stores across South Korea.

== Track listing ==
Drive to the Starry Road track listing
No.	Title	Lyrics	Music	Length
1.	"Candy Sugar Pop"	JinJin; Moonbin; Rocky; MOONi; Enzo; Owol	Jes Meinertz; Rasmus Gregersen; Daniel Michael Victor; Mahias Neumann	2:49
2.	"Something Something"	PCDC	PCDC	3:09
3.	"More"	JinJin; ORAE; Sam Carter; Dash Guy	JinJin; ORAE; Sam Carter; Dash Guy	3:16
4.	"Light the Sky" (하늘빛)	MJ; Park Sang-min	MJ; Park Sang-min; Park Yong-hyeon	3:26
5.	"Story" (MJ solo)	MJ	Genja; Coup D'Etat; coe	3:04
6.	"All Day" (Jinjin solo)	JinJin; ORAE; Sam Carter; Dash Guy	JinJin; ORAE; Sam Carter; Dash Guy	2:55
7.	"First Love" (Cha Eun-woo solo)	Cha Eunwoo; Enzo; MOONi	Ryan Jeon; Josh McCelland; Josh Gray; James Birt	3:09
8.	"Let's Go Ride" (Moonbin solo)	Jooyoung; Hansy	Jooyoung; $un; Bae Moon-su	3:38
9.	"S#1." (Rocky solo)	Rocky; Seori	Rocky; OBROS	3:59
10.	"24 Hours" (24시간; Yoon San-ha solo)	Genja; Coup D'Etat; IONE	Genja; Coup D'Etat; IONE	3:11
11.	"Like Stars" (밤하늘의 별처럼)	Enzo; MOONi; JinJin; Rocky	Enzo; MOONi; Aaron H	3:47
Total length:				36:23

== Charts ==
=== Weekly charts ===
Weekly chart performance for Drive to the Starry Road
Chart (2022)	Peak position
Japanese Albums (Oricon)	6
Japanese Hot Albums (Billboard Japan)	8
South Korean Albums (Gaon)	1

=== Monthly charts ===
Monthly chart performance for Drive to the Starry Road
Chart (2022)	Peak position
Japanese Albums (Oricon)	13
South Korean Albums (Gaon)	7

=== Year-end charts ===
Year-end chart performance for Drive to the Starry Road
Chart (2022)	Position
South Korean Albums (Circle)	54
