= All Light =

Studio album by Astro
- Released: January 16, 2019
- Recorded: 2018
- Genres: K-pop; electropop; dance
- Length: 33:48
- Label: Fantagio
- Producer: LDN Noise

Astro chronology
Rise Up (2018)	All Light (2019)	Venus (2019)

Singles from All Light
- 1. "All Night" Released: January 16, 2019

All Light is the debut Korean-language studio album by South Korean boy band Astro. It was released on January 16, 2019, through Fantagio Music. The album was released following a hiatus due to internal issues at their label. It debuted atop the Gaon Album Chart and reached the top 10 of the US Billboard World Albums chart.

== Background ==
The lead single from the album, "All Night", was called a "soulful dance track" with a "snapping beat guided by groovy synths", a "dynamic beat drop" and a "rhythmic chorus" by Billboard. It was described as showing a "mature" side to the group. The song's lyrics are about a man wanting to talk on the phone "all night" with his love interest. The rest of the album features ballads, as well as electronic pop and dance songs.

== Promotion ==
The album was teased through concept videos posted by the band's members on social media.

== Track listing ==
No.	Title	Lyrics	Music	Arrangement	Length
1.	"Starry Sky"	Korangi; Moon Hanmiru (220volt); Jinjin; Rocky	Korangi; Moon Hanmiru (220volt)	Korangi; ODD-CAT	2:58
2.	"All Night" (Korean: 전화해; RR: Jeonhwahae)	Jo Yoon-kyung; Jinjin; Rocky	LDN Noise; Kyler Niko	LDN Noise	3:43
3.	"Moonwalk"	Jo Yoon-kyung; Jinjin; Rocky	Choi Jin-seok; Jakob Mihoubi; Rudi Daouk	Choi Jin-seok	3:19
4.	"Treasure"	ZUPITER (Flying Lab); 100% Seo-jeong; Jinjin; Rocky	Lee Ju-hyeong; Inner Child (MonoTree)	Inner Child (MonoTree)	3:29
5.	"Role Play"	Mirror Boy (220volt); D.HAM (220volt); Moon Hanmiru (220volt)	Mirror Boy (220volt); Moon Hanmiru (220volt)	Mirror Boy (220volt); Moon Hanmiru (220volt)	3:13
6.	"1 in a Million"	EastWest; Maxine; Jinjin; Rocky	EastWest; Yeul; Maxine; 91.6	Eastwest; Yeul; 91.6	3:05
7.	"Love Wheel"	Lee Mi-so (Music Cube); ZNEE (Flying Lab); Jinjin; Rocky	David Amber; Andy Love	David Amber	3:29
8.	"Heart Brew Love"	Dr.JO; Jinjin; Rocky	Obi Mhondera; Al Swettenham; Kyler Niko	Geek Boy	3:32
9.	"Merry-Go-Round"	EastWest; Maxine; Astro	EastWest; Yeul; Maxine	Eastwest; Yeul	3:09
10.	"Bloom" (Korean: 피어나; RR: Pieona)	Jinjin; MJ; Rocky	Village	Kim Jin-hwan	3:43
Total length:					33:48

== Charts ==
Chart performance for All Light
Chart (2019)	Peak position
Japanese Albums (Oricon)	11
South Korean Albums (Gaon)	1
US World Albums (Billboard)	6

== Accolades ==
Music program awards
Song	Program	Date
All Night	The Show (SBS MTV)	January 29, 2019

Year-end lists
Critic/Publication	List	Song	Rank	Ref.
Dazed	The 20 best K-pop songs of 2019	"All Light"	12	
Refinery29	The Best K-Pop Songs Of 2019	"Moonwalk"	20	

== Sales ==
Sales figures for All Light
Region	Certification	Certified units/sales
Japan	—	8,797

== See also ==
- List of Gaon Album Chart number ones of 2019
