= One & Only (Astro song) =

Single by Astro
- Released: February 23, 2020
- Genre: K-pop
- Length: 4:11
- Label: Fantagio Music; Interpark
- Songwriters: Astro; Obros; zomay
- Producers: Obros; zomay; BigGun; Erskineville; Rocky (Astro); Jin Jin (Astro); MJ (Astro)

Astro singles chronology
"Blue Flame" (2019)	"One & Only" (2020)	"Knock" (2020)

"One & Only" is a song recorded by South Korean boy group Astro. It was digitally released on February 23, 2020, by Fantagio Music and distributed by Interpark, and physically on March 13, 2020, as a limited edition. It's the group's first single album.

== Composition ==
The song was written by all the members of the group, Obros and zomay. It was produced by Obros, zomay, BigGun, Erskineville, alongside members Rocky, Jin Jin and MJ.

== Release ==
The song was released on February 23, 2020, through several music portals, including MelOn and Apple Music.

It was released as a CD single on March 13, 2020, in South Korea and on March 15 in Japan.

== Commercial performance ==
The song failed to enter the main Gaon Digital Chart, but debuted and peaked at number 138 on the componing Download Chart.

The single album debuted and peaked at number 4 on the Gaon Album Chart, for the week ending March 14, 2020. It was the 9th best-selling album in March 2020 with 30,000 copies sold. The album sold 13,770 copies in its first week.

== Track listing ==
Digital download / CD
No.	Title	Lyrics	Music	Arrangement	Length
1.	"One & Only"	Astro; Obros; zomay	Obros; zomay; BigGun; Erskineville; Rocky (Astro); Jin Jin (Astro); MJ (Astro)	Obros; BigGun	4:11
2.	"One & Only" (Inst.)		Obros; zomay; BigGun; Erskineville; Rocky (Astro); Jin Jin (Astro); MJ (Astro)	Obros; BigGun	4:11
Total length:					8:22

== Charts ==
Chart (2020)	Peak position
South Korea (Gaon)	4

== Release history ==
Region	Date	Format	Label
Various	February 23, 2020	Digital download	Fantagio Music, Interpark
South Korea	March 13, 2020	CD	Fantagio Music
Japan	March 15, 2020	CD	Interpark
