= Jinjin =

South Korean rapper (born 1996)

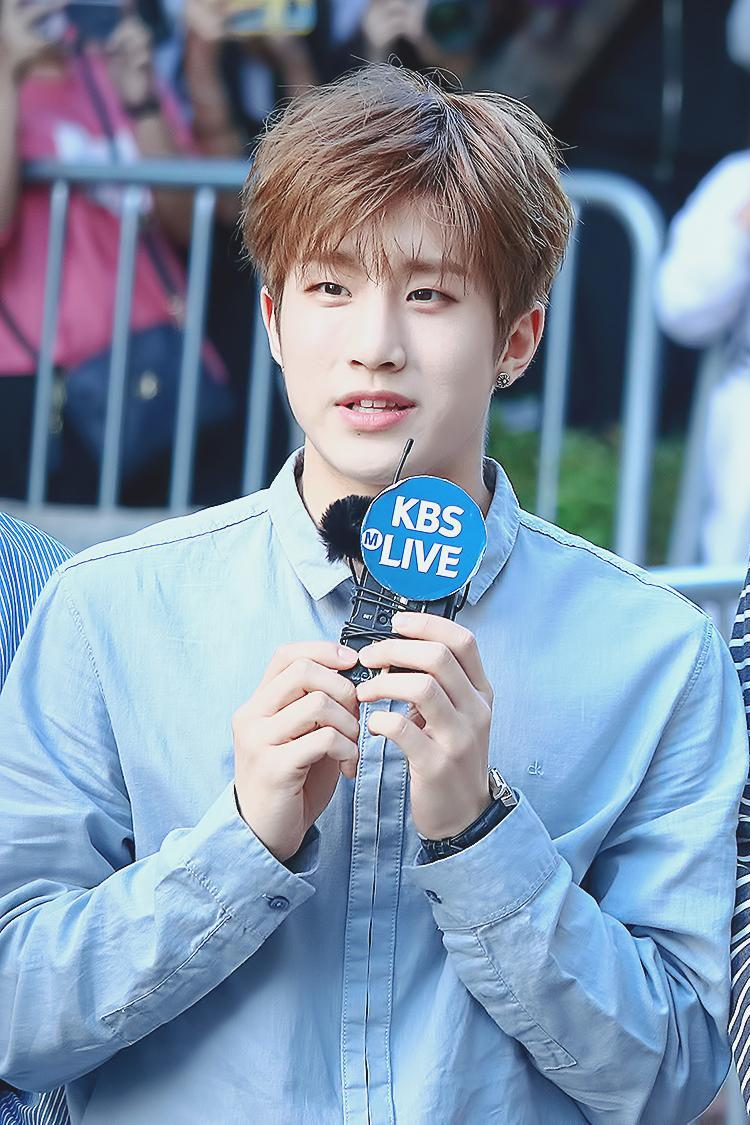
- Jinjin in June 2017
- Born: Park Jin-woo; March 15, 1996 (age 30); Seoul, South Korea
- Education: Hanlim Multi Art School
- Occupations: Rapper; singer; songwriter; dancer; actor
- Musical career
- Genres: K-pop; hip-hop
- Instruments: Vocals; drums
- Years active: 2015–present
- Label: Fantagio
- Member of: Astro; Zoonizini
- Formerly of: Jinjin & Rocky

Korean name
- Hangul: 박진우
- Hanja: 朴真祐
- RR: Bak Jinu
- MR: Pak Chinu

Stage name
- Hangul: 진진
- RR: Jinjin
- MR: Chinjin

Park Jin-woo (Korean: 박진우; born March 15, 1996), known professionally as Jinjin (진진), is a South Korean rapper, singer, songwriter and dancer. He is the leader of South Korean boy group Astro and former member of its sub unit Jinjin & Rocky with ex-member Rocky under the label Fantagio.

== Early life ==
Jinjin was born on March 15, 1996, in Seoul, South Korea. He attended and graduated from Hanlim Multi Art School with a focus on Practical Dance. He attended NY Dance Academy in Ilsan and participated in various dance competitions.

== Career ==
=== 2015: Pre-debut ===
Jinjin was a trainee for 2 years in Fantagio before debuting with Astro. He was the 5th trainee to be officially introduced with the Fantagio iTeen Photo Test Cut. Before their debut, Jinjin along with the other 5 members of Astro had starred in a web-drama To Be Continued.

=== 2016–2021: Debut with Astro and solo activities ===
Jinjin debuted as part of the 6-member boy group Astro on February 23, 2016. Their first EP Spring Up has five songs including the title track "Hide & Seek". In July 2016, Jinjin was featured in Eric Nam's song "Can't Help Myself" performance stages.

In November 2018, Jinjin was featured in tvN Asia's "Wok the World". Jinjin joined the cast in Hong Kong. During Astro's "2nd ASTROAD To Seoul "Starlight"" concert which was last held on December 22–23, 2018, Jinjin performed "Mad Max" which he also composed. It was included in the DVD of the concert which was released in June 2019.

Jinjin alongside fellow Astro member MJ composed "Bloom", which is one of the side tracks in their first full album All Light which was released on January 16, 2019. In March 2019, Jinjin and MJ took part in the travel variety show Go Together, Travel Alone for Celuv TV. The show was filmed in Saipan and includes Tony Ahn, Han Seung-yeon and Kim So-hye. It was later on released in a DVD format. In July 2019, Jinjin and MJ competed in OGN's Game Dolympics.

In May 2020, Jinjin composed one of the side tracks in their seventh EP Gateway, titled "Lights On".

In March 2021, Jinjin began hosting the Dive Studios podcast Unboxing alongside Pentagon's Kino. In December 2021, Jinjin has been credited as a composer, lyricist and arranger of "Villain" — a single included in the first mini album for South Korean boy group Trendz. Fantagio also confirmed in December that Jinjin and bandmate Rocky will form Astro's second sub-unit called Jinjin & Rocky. They will debut with the extended play Restore on January 17, 2022.

=== 2022–present: Sub-unit debut, solo activities, JIN LAB Project and Second sub-unit ===
On January 17, 2022, Jinjin debuted as part of the duo Jinjin & Rocky with the EP Restore. On December 30, Fantagio released an official statement and stated that Jinjin had decided to renew his contract with the agency.

On February 28, 2023, Rocky did not renew his contract and thus left Fantagio and Astro, thereby ending the duo sub-unit. On October 19, Jinjin released the project single 'Wave in my heart featuring Yunhway, with KozyPop through various online music sites.

On March 20, 2024, Jinjin released the first new song of "JIN LAB Project" titled 'Good Enough' through various online music sites. On April 19, Jinjin released new digital single 'Fly' Duet with Moonbin through various online music websites. According to the agency, 'Fly' is a song that Jinjin participated in writing and composing and it's like a gift for fans who miss Moonbin and want to see him. On May 20, Jinjin released the new song of "JIN LAB Project" titled 'For me' featuring MRCH through various online music sites. On June 28, Jinjin released the new song of "JIN LAB Project" titled 'Self-esteem' through various online music sites. On July 29, Jinjin released the new song of "JIN LAB Project" titled 'You' through various online music sites. On August 31, Jinjin released the new song of "JIN LAB Project" titled 'Farewell Letter' through various online music sites. On September 28, Jinjin released the new song of "JIN LAB Project" titled 'Carry On' through various online music sites. On October 25, Jinjin released the new song of "JIN LAB Project" titled 'Here' through various online music sites. On November 30, Jinjin released the new song of "JIN LAB Project" titled 'Runaway' through various online music sites. On December 27, Jinjin released the new song of "JIN LAB Project" titled 'Beat that Drum' through various online music sites.

On January 7, 2025, Fantagio confirms, Jinjin will be holding his first solo concert "JIN LAB Vol1. Find Your Groove". It begins on February 16 in South Korea. On July 29, Fantagio announced that members MJ and Jinjin would form Astro's third sub-unit, Zoonizini. The duo released their debut extended play 'Dice' and its lead single "Some Things Never Change" on August 13, 2025.

== Personal life ==
=== Military service ===
On June 2, 2025, Fantagio announced that JinJin has been exempted from military service duty due to health concerns related to his autoimmune condition.

== Discography ==
Title	Year	Peak chart positions	Album	Ref.
Title	Year	KOR	Album	Ref.
As lead artist
"Like a King" (feat. Superbee, MyunDo) (prod. Dok2)	2018	—	FM2018_12Hz	
"Mad Max"	2018	—	The 2nd ASTROAD to SEOUL DVD	
"Lazy" (feat. Choi Yoo-jung of Weki Meki)	2022	— (Note: "Lazy" did not enter the Gaon Digital Chart, but appeared at number 189 on the component Download Chart.)	Restore	
"All Day"	2022	— (Note: "All Day" did not enter the Gaon Digital Chart, but appeared at number 91 on the component Download Chart.)	Drive to the Starry Road	
"Wave in my heart" (feat. Yunhway)	2023	— (Note: "Wave in my heart" did not enter the Circle Digital Chart, but appeared at number 56 on the component Download Chart.)	Non-album single	
"Good Enough"	2024	— (Note: "Good Enough" did not enter the Circle Digital Chart, but appeared at number 145 on the component Download Chart.)	JIN LAB Project 1.	
"Fly" (with Moonbin)	2024	— (Note: "Fly" did not enter the Circle Digital Chart, but appeared at number 90 on the component Download Chart.)	Non-album single	
"For me" (날 위해) (feat. MRCH)	2024	— (Note: "For me" did not enter the Circle Digital Chart, but appeared at number 193 on the component Download Chart.)	JIN LAB Project 2.	
"Self-esteem" (자존감)	2024	—	JIN LAB Project 3.	
"You"	2024	—	JIN LAB Project 4.	
"Farewell Letter" (이별택배)	2024	—	JIN LAB Project 5.	
"Carry On"	2024	—	JIN LAB Project 6.	
"Here"	2024	—	JIN LAB Project 7.	
"Runaway"	2024	—	JIN LAB Project 8.	
"Beat that Drum"	2024	—	JIN LAB Project 9.	

== Filmography ==
=== Television series ===
Year	Title	Role	Ref.
2024	What Should I Eat Today?	Park Jinwoo	
2025	What Should I Eat Today? 2	Park Jinwoo	

=== Web series ===
Year	Title	Role	Notes	Ref.
2015	To be Continued	Himself		
2016	My Romantic Some Recipe		Guest Role (Episode 6)	
2017	Sweet Revenge	Himself		
2019	Soul Plate	Angel Ariel		

=== Television shows ===
Year	Title	Role	Ref.
2019	Go Together, Travel Alone	Main Cast	

=== Web shows ===
Year	Title	Role	Ref.
2021	X: Endline, New Beginning	Cast Member	
2022	X: New World	Cast Member	

=== Podcast ===
Year	Title	Ref.
2021	Unboxing w/ Jinjin & Kino	

=== Radio shows ===
Year	Title	Role	Notes	Ref.
2023–2025	Idol Korean	DJ	October 2, 2023–February 28, 2025	

== Theater ==
Year	English title	Role	Ref.
2023	Dream High	Jason	
2023	Winter Wanderer	Park Hyuntae	
2024	Crash Landing on You	Goo Seung-joon / Alberto Goo	
2025	Dream High	Song Samdong	

== Accolades ==
=== Awards and nominations ===
Name of the award ceremony, year presented, category, nominee of the award, and the result of the nomination
Award ceremony	Year	Category	Nominee / Work	Result	Ref.
Top Ten Awards	2023	Best Global Artist – Mexico	Jinjin	Won	
