= Spring Up =

2016 extended play by ASTRO

EP by Astro
- Released: February 23, 2016
- Recorded: 2015–2016
- Genre: K-pop; dance; ballad
- Language: Korean
- Label: Fantagio Music; Interpark

Astro chronology
Spring Up (2016)	Summer Vibes (2016)

Singles from Spring Up
- 1. "Hide & Seek" Released: February 23, 2016; 2. "Cat's Eye" Released: February 25, 2016

Music video
- "Hide & Seek" on YouTube "Cat's Eye" on YouTube

Spring Up is the debut extended play by the South Korean boy band Astro. The album was released digitally and physically on February 23, 2016 by Fantagio. The EP contains five tracks, including the singles "Hide & Seek" and "Cat's Eye".

== Background and release ==
In mid-January 2016, Fantagio announced that Astro would release a debut EP on February 23. On February 11, the first teaser video for the album was posted, presenting members of the group. On February 15, a "Highlight Video" was posted, presenting all the songs on the album. On February 18, the first music video teaser was posted. On February 22, the music video for "Hide & Seek" was released and on February 25, the video for "Cat's Eye" was released.

== Promotion ==
Astro held a live showcase on February 22–23, where they performed "Hide & Seek" along with the dance track "Cat's Eye", and ballads "First Love" and "Morning Call".

The group started promoting "Hide & Seek" with the b-side "Cat's Eye" on music shows on February 25. They first performed the songs on MBC M's Show Champion, followed by performances on Mnet's M! Countdown, KBS' Music Bank, MBC's Show! Music Core and SBS's Inkigayo.

The EP debuted on the Billboard World Albums chart at #6, and it lasted for two weeks on the weeks of March 12 and March 19.

== Track listing ==
No.	Title	Lyrics	Music	Arrangement	Length
1.	"Ok! Ready" (Ok! 준비완료)		Iggy Young-bae	Iggy Young-bae	1:13
2.	"Hide & Seek" (숨바꼭질)	Iggy Young-bae	Iggy Young-bae	Iggy Young-bae	3:17
3.	"Innocent Love" (풋사랑)	Iggy Young-bae	Iggy Young-bae	Iggy Young-bae	3:26
4.	"Morning Call" (모닝콜)	Seo Young-bae; Park Woo-sang	Seo Young-bae; Park Woo-sang	Seo Young-bae; Park Woo-sang	3:34
5.	"Cat's Eye" (장화 신은 고양이)	Park Woo-sang	Park Woo-sang	Park Woo-sang	2:45
Total length:					14:16

== Charts ==
=== Weekly ===
Chart	Peak position
South Korean Albums (Gaon)	4
US World Albums (Billboard)	6

=== Monthly ===
Chart	Peak position
South Korean Albums (Gaon)	13

=== Year-end ===
Chart (2016)	Peak position
South Korean Albums (Gaon)	91

== Sales and certifications ==
Chart	Amount
Gaon Charts	24,004+

== Release history ==
Region	Date	Format	Label
South Korea	February 23, 2016	CD, digital download, streaming	Fantagio Music, Interpark
Various	February 23, 2016	Digital download, streaming	Fantagio Music, Interpark
