= Astro (South Korean band) =

South Korean boy band

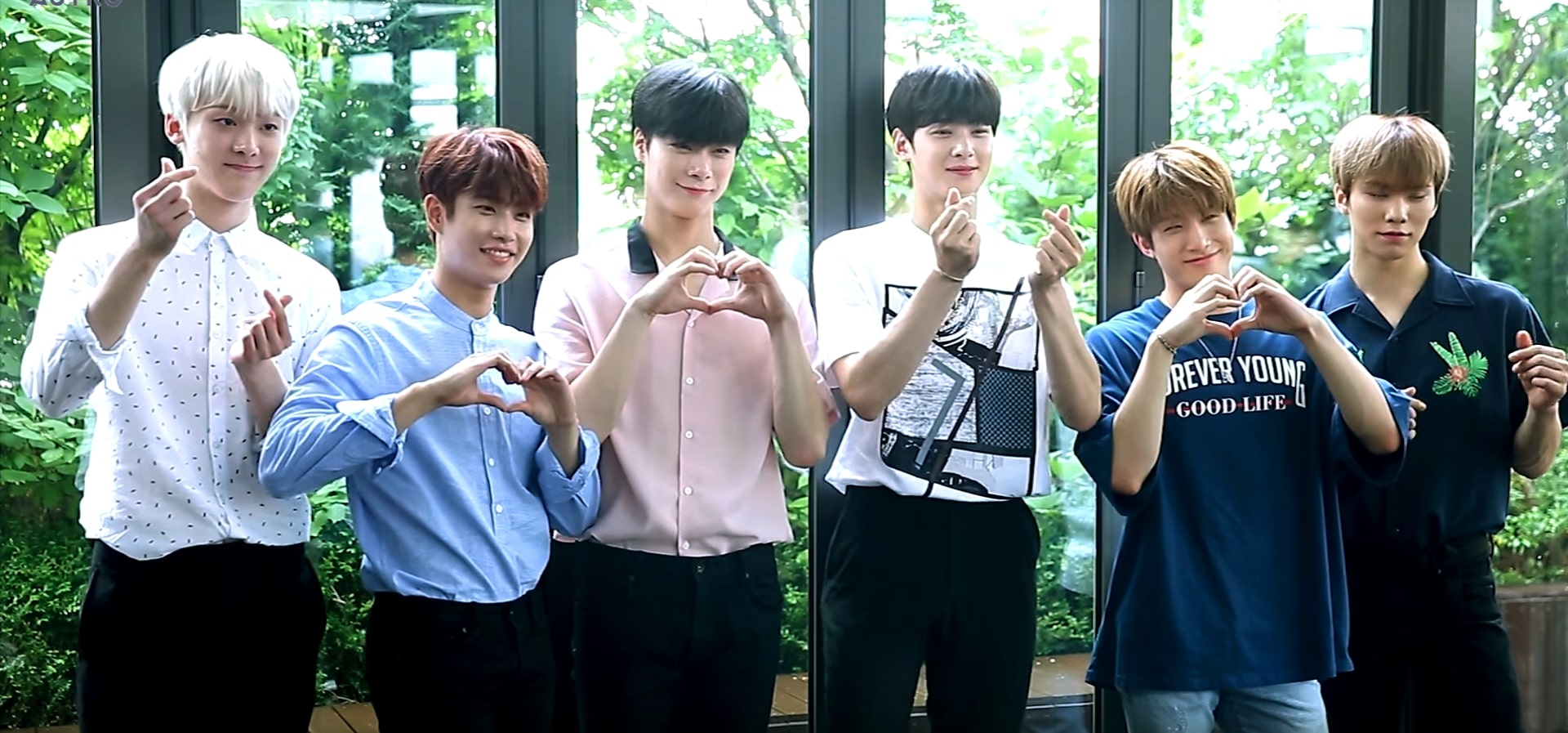
- Astro in September 2017; From left to right: Sanha, MJ, Moonbin, Eunwoo, Jinjin, and Rocky

Background information
- Origin: Seoul, South Korea
- Genres: K-pop; electropop; synth-pop; R&B
- Years active: 2016–present
- Labels: Fantagio; Universal Japan
- Spinoffs: Moonbin & Sanha; Jinjin & Rocky; Zoonizini
- Members: MJ; Jinjin; Eunwoo; Sanha
- Past members: Rocky; Moonbin
- Website: fantagio.kr/musicians/아스트로

Astro (Korean: 아스트로; stylized in all caps) is a South Korean boy band formed by Fantagio. The group is composed of four members: MJ, Jinjin, Cha Eun-woo, and Yoon San-ha. Astro was originally a sextet; Rocky departed from the group on February 28, 2023, and Moonbin died on April 19, 2023. They debuted on February 23, 2016, with the extended play Spring Up and were subsequently named as one of the best new K-pop acts of 2016 by Billboard.

== Career ==
=== Pre-debut ===
Astro was formed through the rookie talent development program "i-Teen", which was created by their agency Fantagio. In August 2015, the final member line-up and group name were announced. The same month, the group starred in a web drama titled To Be Continued, which aimed to introduce them to the public. The drama featured the members as themselves, as well as Kim Sae-ron, Seo Kang-joon, and the girl group Hello Venus.

After their web drama finished airing, the group started the "Meet U" project. As part of the project, Astro traveled through South Korea, covering songs in front of crowds and holding fan meetings. Along with the performances, a KakaoTalk Plus Friends account was set up. Fantagio stated that once the group had gathered 10,000 friends on the app, they would announce their official debut date. The goal was met by December 2015. Their debut showcase, held on January 28, 2016, was sold out in under a minute and far exceeded the original limit of 1,000 attendants. There, they also announced their official fan club name, Aroha.

They also appeared in their own reality TV show titled Astro OK! Ready, which began airing on January 21, 2016, on MBC every1 and concluded on February 18, 2016.

=== 2016: Debut with Spring Up and rising popularity ===
On February 23, 2016, Astro released their debut extended play Spring Up alongside its lead single "Hide & Seek". For two days, starting on February 22, 2016, showcases and press conferences were held at Lotte Card Art Center and Wapop Concert Hall to commemorate the group's first release. Within a week of its release, Spring Up reached number six on the Billboard World Albums Chart in the United States, as well as number four on the Gaon Album Chart. On February 25, the group released the music video for "Cat's Eye" (장화 신은 고양이), containing clips from their web drama To Be Continued. On April 13, Astro was the only Korean act invited to the LeTV Entertainment Awards in China.

Their second extended play Summer Vibes was released on July 1. The album peaked at number six on the Billboard World Albums Chart and at number two on the Gaon Album Chart. Furthermore, the music video for "Breathless" (숨가빠), featuring labelmate Choi Yoo-jung of Weki Meki, surpassed half a million views in just three days. The same month, on July 31, Astro performed in front of more than 20,000 people at Staples Center in Los Angeles for KCON 2016.

Just five months after their debut, Astro held their first solo mini concert titled Astro 2016 Mini Live – Thankx Aroha from August 27 to 28 at the KEPCO Art Center in Seoul. Additional showcases were held in Japan, Indonesia, and Thailand throughout the months of October and November.

The group released their third extended play Autumn Story on November 10. The music video to its lead single "Confession" (고백) featured Sei of Weki Meki. Simultaneously, their reality TV show Astro Project A.S.I.A, which explored the events of their first oversea showcases, began airing. In December, Billboard named Astro one of the best new K-pop groups of 2016.

=== 2017–2018: First tour, group hiatus, and Rise Up ===
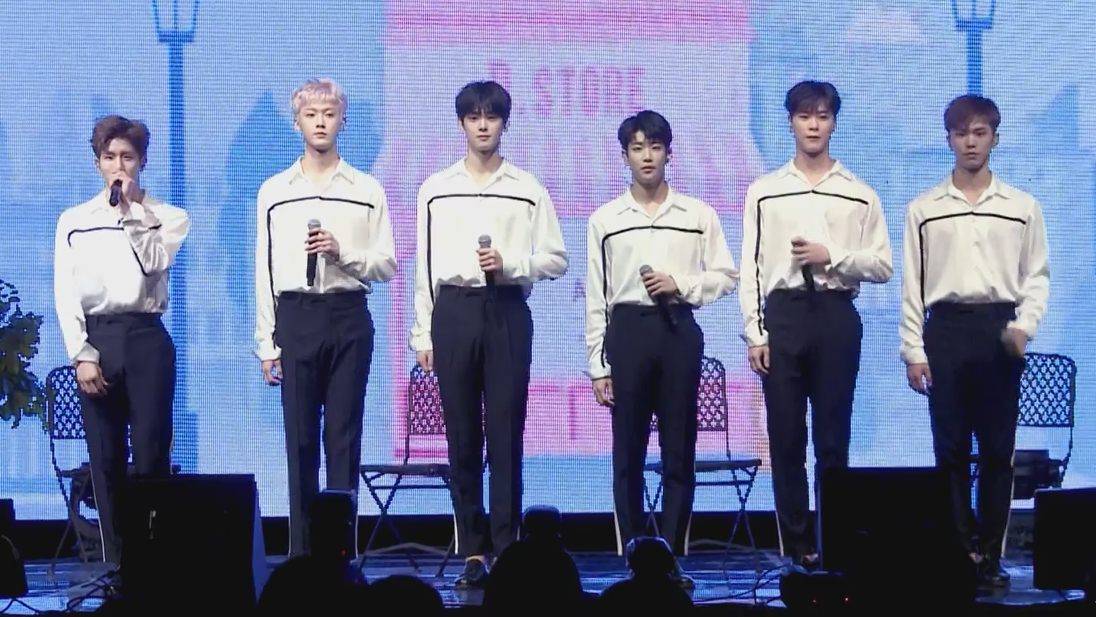
Astro at their showcase for Dream Part.01

On February 22, 2017, one day before their one-year anniversary, Astro's four seasons project came to a close with their special album Winter Dream. The album and its lead single "Again" (붙잡았어야 해) were neither promoted on any music shows nor did they receive a music video. The group did, however, resume their overseas showcases with performances in Thailand, Taiwan, Singapore, and Hong Kong. The group released their fourth extended play Dream Part.01, featuring the lead single "Baby", on May 29. The album placed sixth on the Billboard World Albums Chart. The same month, Astro signed a contract with Avex Taiwan to handle their music distribution in Taiwan, China, Hong Kong, and Southeast Asia. On July 15, 2017, the group started their first tour, titled The 1st Astroad to Seoul, in Seoul at Olympic Hall, later expanding it with stops in Osaka, and Tokyo. On November 1, Astro released their fifth extended play Dream Part.02, featuring the lead single "Crazy Sexy Cool" (니가 불어와). A limited "Wish" edition of the EP was released on January 10, 2018. All 10,000 copies were sold out in pre-orders alone. The edition contains a poem written by member Cha Eun-woo titled "Purple Evening", a hidden "Thanks to", as well as polaroid pictures taken by the members themselves.

The group held a second showcase in Taiwan on January 20, 2018, at the Taipei International Convention Center (TICC). Throughout the months of February and March, Astro held twelve fan meetings across nine cities around the world, visiting the United States, Canada, South Korea, Japan, and Thailand. On July 24, after a prolonged hiatus, Astro released their second special extended play Rise Up alongside its lead single "Always You" (너잖아). Due to internal issues at their label, Fantagio Music, the album was not promoted on music shows. Still, the group proceeded to hold their second Japan tour 2nd Astroad to Japan in August, with performances in Nagoya, Osaka, and Tokyo. Another tour titled The 2nd Astroad to Seoul [Star Light] (Part 1) in South Korea followed, concluding on December 23 with a last performance in Seoul at KBS Hall.

=== 2019: First studio album All Night, Japanese debut with Venus, and Moonbin's hiatus ===
On January 16, 2019, following their 14-month hiatus without any full comeback, Astro released their first studio album All Light. To further promote the album, the group continued their The 2nd Astroad to Seoul [Star Light] tour with shows in Taiwan, the United States, Hong Kong, and Thailand. On January 29, they received their first music show win for "All Night" (전화해) on the SBS MTV music program The Show.

On April 3, Astro made their Japanese debut with the extended play Venus. The EP features three original Japanese tracks along with Japanese versions of their Korean singles "Baby", "Always You", and "All Night". The release was well-received by the general public, ranking third on the Oricon Weekly Album Chart and peaking at number one on the Daily Album Chart.

On November 12, Fantagio announced that Moonbin would be going on a hiatus to recover from health issues and focus on his treatment. Subsequently, Moonbin did not participate in the promotions for the group's sixth extended play Blue Flame, which was released on November 20. His parts were, therefore, temporarily re-distributed amongst the remaining members. Despite this, he still took part in the recording of the EP and appeared in the music video for their lead single "Blue Flame".

=== 2020: One & Only, Gateway, and first sub-unit Moonbin & Sanha ===
On February 14, 2020, Moonbin appeared in a V Live broadcast with the other Astro members, officially ending his hiatus. In celebration of their fourth debut anniversary, Astro released a special digital single album titled One & Only on February 23. A physical edition of the single was released on March 13.

In May 4, Astro released their seventh extended play Gateway. On May 12, the EP's lead single "Knock" earned the group their second win on the MBC M music show Show Champion. On June 28, Astro held their first online live streaming concert 2020 Astro Live on WWW, where they performed the song "No, I Don't" for the first time. On the same day, the single was distributed digitally through various streaming services.

On August 14, Fantagio confirmed that members Moonbin and Yoon San-ha would form Astro's first sub-unit called Moonbin & Sanha and that the recording for the unit's first extended play had already been completed. Their debut EP In-Out, featuring the lead single "Bad Idea", was released on September 14. Eight days later, on September 22, the sub-unit received their first music show award from The Show, making them the fastest K-pop sub-unit to receive their first win on a music show.

On December 31, Astro released the digital single "We Still (Be With U)" as a special year-end gift to their fans. The song is a re-arranged, winter-themed version of the track "We Still" from their seventh extended play Gateway.

=== 2021: Second studio album All Yours and solo activities ===
On April 5, 2021, Astro released their second studio album All Yours. The group received a total of three music show wins for its title track "One": the first one on The Show on April 13; the second on Show Champion on April 14; and finally on M Countdown on April 15, making it their first win on the program. On June 10, All Yours became the first Astro album to be certified platinum by Gaon.

On August 2, the group released their eighth extended play Switch On. The music video for its lead single "After Midnight" garnered 10 million views in 34 hours, breaking the record previously set by "One". On August 10, they earned their first music show win for "After Midnight" on The Show. Just one day after, the group received their second win on Show Champion, followed by their third win on Music Bank on August 13 and their fourth win on Show! Music Core on August 14. This also marked their first win on the latter two music shows and their first win on national TV since their debut. On October 7, Switch On was certified platinum by Gaon, making it their second album to reach platinum.

On September 2, Astro released the promotional single "Alive" for the mobile application Universe, the music video to which was distributed exclusively through the app. The song appeared at number 103 on the Gaon Download Chart.

On October 14, Fantagio confirmed that MJ would be the first member to promote as a solo artist. He made his solo debut with the semi-trot single album Happy Virus on November 3. The song was released digitally and was produced by trot musician Young Tak. The single also features child singer Kim Tae-yeon, who was also a contestant on Miss Trot 2. On November 29, MJ became the first K-pop idol to ever place first on the SBS music program The Trot Show.

=== 2022–2023: Second sub-unit, MJ's enlistment, Rocky's departure, and Moonbin's death ===
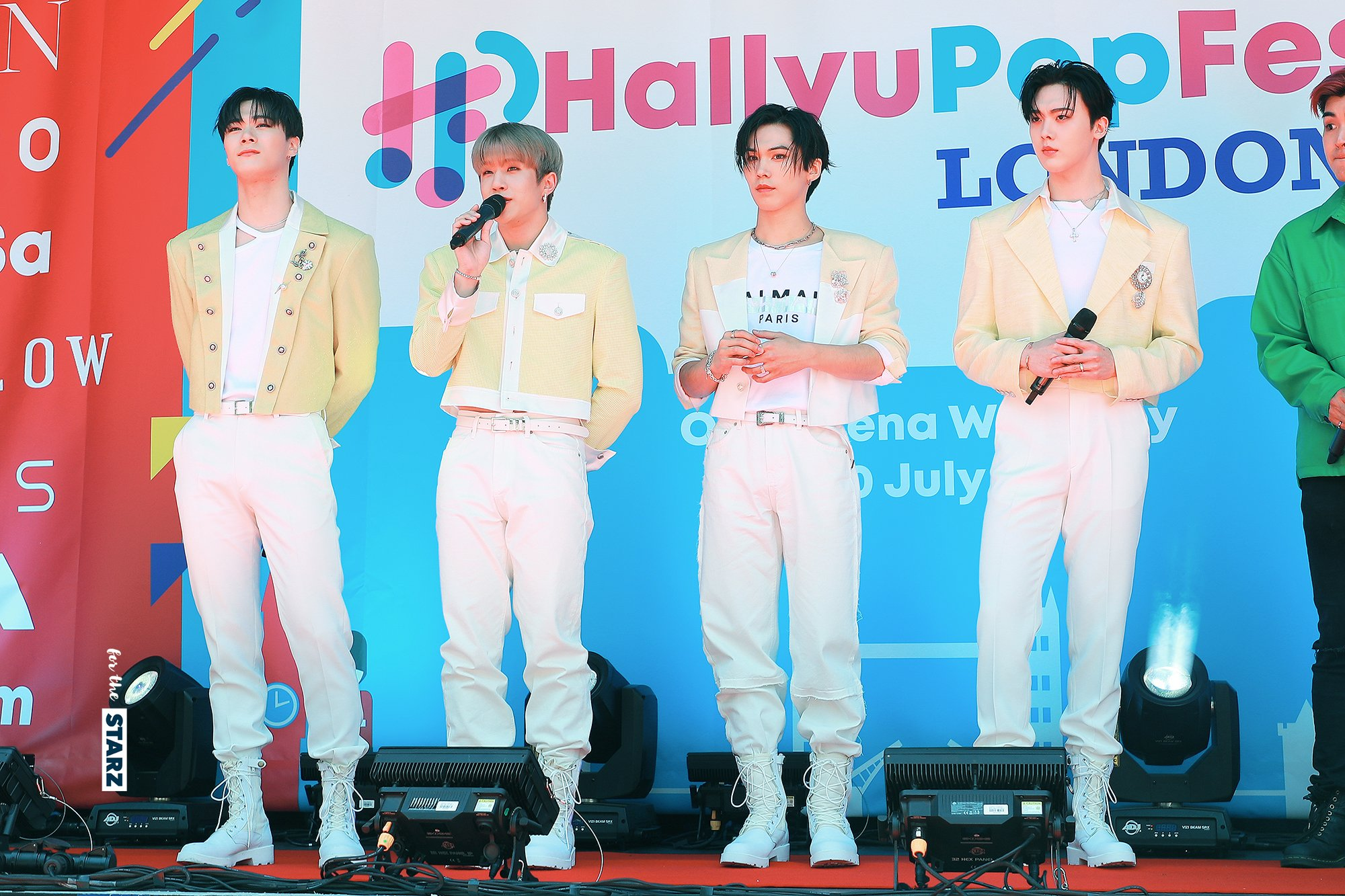
From left to right: Moonbin, Jinjin, Rocky, and Sanha at the HallyuPopFest 2022 in London

On December 28, 2021, Fantagio announced that members Jinjin and Rocky would form Astro's second sub-unit, Jinjin & Rocky. The duo released their debut extended play Restore and its lead single "Just Breath" (숨 좀 쉬자) on January 17, 2022. On January 28, Fantagio announced that MJ would temporarily halt activities due to health issues.

Originally scheduled for March 13, Astro held their annual fan meeting Astro Aroha Festival to commemorate their sixth anniversary on April 9, this time titled 2022 Astro Aroha Festival [Gate 6]. The event was held both online and in person, making it their first fan meeting with a live audience since 2019, prior to the COVID-19 pandemic. During the fan meeting, MJ announced that he would enlist in the military as part of his mandatory military service on May 9, making him the first Astro member to serve. He served in the military band. On May 16, Astro released their third studio album Drive to the Starry Road. The album features solo songs performed by all six members. While he would not be able to partake in promotional activities due to his military enlistment, MJ took part in the music video shooting. The album topped the Gaon Weekly Retail Album Chart in the week from May 15 to May 21, 2022, with 142,380 copies sold. Its lead single "Candy Sugar Pop" won a total of four music show awards: the first one on The Show on May 24, the second on Show Champion on May 25, the third on M Countdown on May 26, and the fourth on Music Bank on May 27. From May 28 to May 29, Astro started their third solo concert tour 3rd Astroad to Seoul [Stargazer] at the Jamsil Indoor Stadium in Seoul. They continued their tour with 3rd Astroad to Japan from June 3 to 4, selling out all 40,000 seats at Makuhari Messe International Exhibition Hall in Chiba near Tokyo. On July 21, Astro released the promotional single "U&Iverse" for the Universe app through Universe Music. "U&Iverse" appeared at number 95 on the Circle Download Chart. On November 30, Astro released the Japanese single "Ichiban sukina hito ni sayonara wo iou" (1番好きな人にサヨナラを言おう; lit. 'Saying goodbye to the person I love most'). The music video features member Cha Eun-woo and Japanese actress and model Airi Matsui and was shot entirely in Japan. In addition, a solo version performed by Cha Eun-woo was recorded for the CD release. On December 30, Fantagio released an official statement reporting that Jinjin, Cha Eun-woo, Moonbin, and Sanha had decided to renew their contracts, while Rocky's renewal was still in discussions and MJ's would be discussed after his discharge from the military.

On February 28, 2023, it was announced that Rocky had ultimately decided to leave the agency and the group. On April 20, Yonhap News reported that Moonbin had died the prior evening, which was later confirmed by Astro's agency Fantagio. The circumstances of his death were investigated by the police.

=== 2024–present: Focus on solo activities, Cha Eun-woo's enlistment and third sub-unit ===
In 2024, Cha Eun-woo embarked on the Just One 10 Minutes "Mystery Elevator", his first solo fan concert. It begin on February 17 in South Korea, and includes visits to Malaysia, Thailand, Philippines, Japan, Singapore, and Indonesia. On January 9, Fantagio confirmed Cha Eun-woo would debut as soloist and was preparing for his solo album which was scheduled to be released by the first half of 2024. On February 8, Fantagio confirmed Yoon San-ha would be having intimate theater concert "SANiGHT Project #1". It began on March 20 in South Korea, and Japan. On February 15, Cha Eun-woo extended play Entity was released, containing the lead single "Stay". The music video features him and American actress India Eisley. On February 23, Astro released the digital single "Circles" as a surprise fan song to commemorate its 8th anniversary of debut. On August 6, Yoon San-ha made his solo debut with the release of the EP Dusk, along with its lead single "Dive". On December 18, MJ renewed his contract with the agency.

On January 7, 2025, Fantagio confirmed Jinjin would be holding his first solo concert "JIN LAB Vol1. Find Your Groove". It began on February 16 in South Korea. On February 21, Fantagio confirmed Yoon San-ha would be having intimate theater concert "SANiGHT Project #2" on his birthday. It began on March 21 in South Korea. On February 23, Astro released the special digital single "Twilight" music video as a surprise fan song to commemorate its 9th anniversary of debut. On March 28, Cha led the organization of a tribute song for Moonbin, which was released on April 19 to mark the second anniversary of his death. He personally contacted all those involved in the project. On April 14, it was announced that the group would collaborate with Rocky for The 4th Astroad [Stargraphy]. On May 9, Cha Eun-woo applied to join the military band of the Republic of Korea Army and attended the required interview, with the official results to be announced on May 29. The Military Manpower Administration announced that was included in the list of successful applicants for the military band. He is confirmed to enlist on July 28. On July 29, Fantagio announced that members MJ and Jinjin would form Astro's third sub-unit, Zoonizini. The duo released their debut extended play Dice and its lead single "Some Things Never Change" on August 13, 2025.

== Members ==
- MJ (엠제이)
- Jinjin (진진)
- Cha Eunwoo (차은우)
- Sanha (윤산하)

=== Former ===
- Moonbin (문빈, died 2023)
- Rocky (라키)

== Discography ==
- All Light (2019)
- All Yours (2021)
- Drive to the Starry Road (2022)

== Filmography ==
=== Film ===
| Year | Title | Notes | Ref. |
|---|---|---|---|
| 2022 | Stargazer: Astroscope | Documentary film | |

=== Web series ===
| Year | Title | Role | Notes | Ref. |
|---|---|---|---|---|
| 2015 | To Be Continued | Themselves | | |
| 2017 | Sweet Revenge | Themselves | Special appearance | |
| 2019 | Soul Plate | Themselves | | |

=== Television shows ===
| Year | Title | Ref. |
|---|---|---|
| 2016 | Astro OK! Ready | |
| 2016 | Astro Project A.S.I.A | |

=== Web shows ===
| Year | Title | Notes | Ref. |
|---|---|---|---|
| 2020 | Astro's 1001 Nights | | |
| 2021 | Astro SSAP-Dance | UNIVERSE Original | |
| 2021 | Astro Chemi-Mate ZZG | UNIVERSE Original | |
| 2021 | Astro Space Force A: Secret Golden Bowl | UNIVERSE Original | |
| 2021 | Astro Zone | | |
| 2021 | Before Midnight | | |
| 2022 | Astro Hostel | | |

== Concerts and tours ==
=== Headlining tours ===
- The 1st Astroad to Seoul (2017)
- The 1st Astroad to Japan (2017)
- The 1st Astroad to Taipei (2018)
- The 2nd Astroad to Japan (2018)
- The 2nd Astroad to Seoul [Star Light] (Part 1) (2018)
- The 2nd Astroad to Seoul [Star Light] (Part 2) (2019)
- The 3rd Astroad to Seoul [Stargazer] (2022)
- The 3rd Astroad to Japan [Stargazer] (2022)
- The 4th Astroad [Stargraphy] (2025)

=== Headlining concerts ===
- Astro 2016 Mini Live – Thankx Aroha (2016)
- The 1st Astro Aroha Festival (2017)
- Astro 1st Mini Concert in Taipei (2017)
- Astro 1st Show in Hong Kong (2017)
- The 2nd Astro Aroha Festival (2018)
- The 3rd Astro Aroha Festival [Black] (2019)
- The 4th Astro Aroha Festival [Campus] (2020)
- 2020 Astro Live on WWW (2020)
- 2022 Astro Aroha Festival [Gate 6] (2022)

== Awards and nominations ==
Name of the award ceremony, year presented, category, nominated work, and the result of the nomination
| Award ceremony | Year | Category | Nominee / Work | Result | Ref. |
|---|---|---|---|---|---|
| Asia Artist Awards | 2016 | Most Popular Artists (Singer) | Astro | Nominated | |
| Asia Artist Awards | 2017 | New Wave Award | Astro | Won | |
| Asia Artist Awards | 2017 | Popularity Award | Astro | Nominated | |
| Asia Artist Awards | 2020 | Male Idol Popularity Award | Astro | Nominated | |
| Asia Artist Awards | 2021 | Male Idol Popularity Award | Astro | Nominated | |
| Asia Artist Awards | 2021 | Best Musician Award | Astro | Won | |
| Asia Artist Awards | 2022 | Popularity Award | Astro | Nominated | |
| Circle Chart Music Awards | 2017 | Rookie of the Year — Album | Spring Up | Nominated | |
| Circle Chart Music Awards | 2017 | Popularity Award | Astro | Nominated | |
| Circle Chart Music Awards | 2020 | Album of the Year — 1st Quarter | All Light | Nominated | |
| Dahsyatnya Awards | 2017 | Outstanding Guest Star | Astro | Won | |
| The Fact Music Awards | 2021 | Artist of the Year (Bonsang) | Astro | Won | |
| Golden Disc Awards | 2017 | Best New Artist | Astro | Nominated | |
| Golden Disc Awards | 2017 | Popularity Award | Astro | Nominated | |
| Golden Disc Awards | 2018 | Disc Bonsang | Dream Part.01 | Nominated | |
| Golden Disc Awards | 2018 | Global Popularity Award | Astro | Nominated | |
| Golden Disc Awards | 2020 | Disc Bonsang | All Light | Nominated | |
| Golden Disc Awards | 2020 | Most Popular Artist | Astro | Nominated | |
| Golden Disc Awards | 2020 | Best Male Performance Award | Astro | Won | |
| Golden Disc Awards | 2022 | Disc Daesang | All Yours | Nominated | |
| Golden Disc Awards | 2022 | Seezn Most Popular Artist Award | Astro | Nominated | |
| Hanteo Music Awards | 2021 | Artist Award — Male Group | Astro | Nominated | |
| Korean Culture Entertainment Awards | 2016 | K-Pop Artist Award | Astro | Won | |
| Korean Culture Entertainment Awards | 2020 | K-Pop Artist Award | Astro | Won | |
| Melon Music Awards | 2016 | Best New Artist | Astro | Nominated | |
| Mnet Asian Music Awards | 2016 | Best New Male Artist | Astro | Nominated | |
| Mnet Asian Music Awards | 2016 | HotelsCombined Artist of the Year | Astro | Nominated | |
| Mnet Asian Music Awards | 2021 | Worldwide Fans' Choice Top 10 | Astro | Nominated | |
| Mnet Asian Music Awards | 2022 | Worldwide Fans' Choice Top 10 | Astro | Nominated | |
| MTV Europe Music Awards | 2020 | Best Korean Act | Astro | Nominated | |
| Seoul Music Awards | 2017 | Best New Artist | Astro | Nominated | |
| Seoul Music Awards | 2017 | Popularity Award | Astro | Nominated | |
| Seoul Music Awards | 2017 | K-Wave Special Award | Astro | Won | |
| Seoul Music Awards | 2020 | Main Prize (Bonsang) | Blue Flame | Nominated | |
| Seoul Music Awards | 2020 | QQ Music Most Popular K-Pop Artist Award | Astro | Nominated | |
| Seoul Music Awards | 2021 | Main Prize (Bonsang) | Astro | Nominated | |
| Seoul Music Awards | 2021 | K-Wave Special Award | Astro | Nominated | |
| Seoul Music Awards | 2022 | Main Prize (Bonsang) | Switch On | Nominated | |
| Seoul Music Awards | 2022 | Popularity Award | Switch On | Nominated | |
| Seoul Music Awards | 2022 | K-Wave Special Award | Switch On | Nominated | |
| Seoul Music Awards | 2022 | U+Idol Live Best Artist Award | Astro | Nominated | |
| Seoul Music Awards | 2023 | Main Prize (Bonsang) | Drive to the Starry Road | Nominated | |
| Seoul Music Awards | 2023 | K-Wave Special Award | Drive to the Starry Road | Nominated | |
| Soribada Best K-Music Awards | 2019 | Global Hot Trend Award | Astro | Won | |
| Soribada Best K-Music Awards | 2020 | Bonsang Award | Astro | Won | |
| Soribada Best K-Music Awards | 2020 | Global Artist Award | Astro | Won | |
| Soribada Best K-Music Awards | 2020 | Male Popularity Award | Astro | Nominated | |
