= 31st Golden Disc Awards =

2017 South Korean music awards ceremony

- Date: January 13–14, 2017
- Location: Korea International Exhibition Center, Ilsan, Gyeonggi Province
- Country: South Korea
- Hosted by: Hwang Chi-yeul; Seohyun; Jung Yong-hwa; Kang So-ra; Sung Si-kyung

Television/radio coverage
- Network: JTBC, JTBC2

The 31st Golden Disc Awards ceremony was held on January 13–14, 2017. The JTBC network broadcast the show from the Korea International Exhibition Center (KINTEX) in Ilsan. Hwang Chi-yeul, Seohyun and Jung Yong-hwa served as hosts on the first day, with Kang So-ra and Sung Si-kyung on the second.

== Criteria ==
Albums and songs released between November 1, 2015, and November 30, 2016, were eligible to be nominated for the 31st Golden Disc Awards. The winners of the digital music, album and rookie categories were determined by music sales (70%), a panel of music experts (20%) and online votes (10%). Music sales were based on data from Gaon Music Chart and were counted until December 31, 2016. The Popularity Award was based entirely on online votes.

== Winners and nominees ==
=== Main awards ===
Winners and nominees are listed in alphabetical order. Winners are listed first and emphasized in bold.

Digital Daesang (Song of the Year)	Disc Daesang (Album of the Year)
**Twice – "Cheer Up"**; GFriend – "Rough"; Im Chang-jung – "The Love I Committed"; Lee Hi – "Breathe"; Mamamoo – "You're the Best"; Suzy & Baekhyun – "Dream"; Taeyeon – "Rain"; Urban Zakapa – "I Don't Love You"; Zico – "I Am You, You Are Me"	**Exo – Ex'Act**; BTS – Wings; Got7 – Flight Log: Turbulence; Infinite – Infinite Only; Monsta X – The Clan Pt. 1 Lost; Seventeen – Love & Letter; Shinee – 1 of 1; Taemin – Press It; VIXX – Chained Up
Digital Song Bonsang	Album Bonsang
**GFriend – "Rough"**; **Im Chang-jung – "The Love I Committed"**; **Lee Hi – "Breathe"**; **Mamamoo – "You're the Best"**; **Suzy & Baekhyun – "Dream"**; **Taeyeon – "Rain"**; **Twice – "Cheer Up"**; **Urban Zakapa – "I Don't Love You"**; **Zico – "I Am You, You Are Me"**; 10cm – "What the Spring?"; Ailee – "If You"; AKMU – "Re-Bye"; Baek A-yeon – "So So"; Blackpink – "Whistle"; Crush – "Don't Forget"; EXID – "L.I.E"; Exo – "Monster"; Gary – "Lonely Night"; I.O.I – "Very Very Very"; Jang Beom-june – "Fallen in Love"; John Park – "Thought of You"; Jung Eun-ji – "Hopefully Sky"; MC the Max – "No Matter Where"; Park Hyo-shin – "Breath"; Park Kyung – "Inferiority Complex"; Red Velvet – "Russian Roulette"; Sistar – "I Like That"; Sechs Kies – "Three Words"; Standing Egg – "Summer Night You and I"; Wonder Girls – "Why So Lonely"	**BTS – Wings**; **Exo – Ex'Act**; **Got7 – Flight Log: Turbulence**; **Infinite – Infinite Only**; **Monsta X – The Clan Pt. 1 Lost**; **Seventeen – Love & Letter**; **Shinee – 1 of 1**; **Taemin – Press It**; **VIXX – Chained Up**; 2PM – Gentlemen's Game; B1A4 – Good Timing; B.A.P – Carnival; GFriend – LOL; Beast – Highlight; BtoB – Remember That; F.T. Island – Where's the Truth?; I.O.I – Chrysalis; Jessica – With Love, J; Jonghyun – She Is; Jun. K – Mr. No; Kim Jae-joong – No.X; Nam Woo-hyun – Write..; NCT 127 – NCT #127; Red Velvet – Russian Roulette; Taeyeon – Why; Teen Top – Red Point; Tiffany – I Just Wanna Dance; Twice – Twicecoaster: Lane 1; Up10tion – Spotlight; Yesung – Here I Am
Rookie Artist of the Year	Popularity Award
**Blackpink (digital)**; **Bolbbalgan4 (digital)**; **I.O.I (album)**; **NCT 127 (album)**; Astro; Gugudan; Imfact; Jung Seung-hwan; KNK; Pentagon; Snuper; WJSN	**Shinee**

=== Special awards ===
Award	Winner
Best R&B/Soul Award	Crush
Best OST Award	Gummy
Best Male Performance	Sechs Kies
Best Female Performance	Sistar
Ceci Asia Icon Award	Exo
Ceci Asia Icon Award	Red Velvet
Producer Award	Bang Si-hyuk
Best K-pop Band	CNBLUE
Asia Popularity Award	Kim Jae-joong
Global K-pop Artist Award	BTS

== Gallery ==
Partial award ceremony gallery

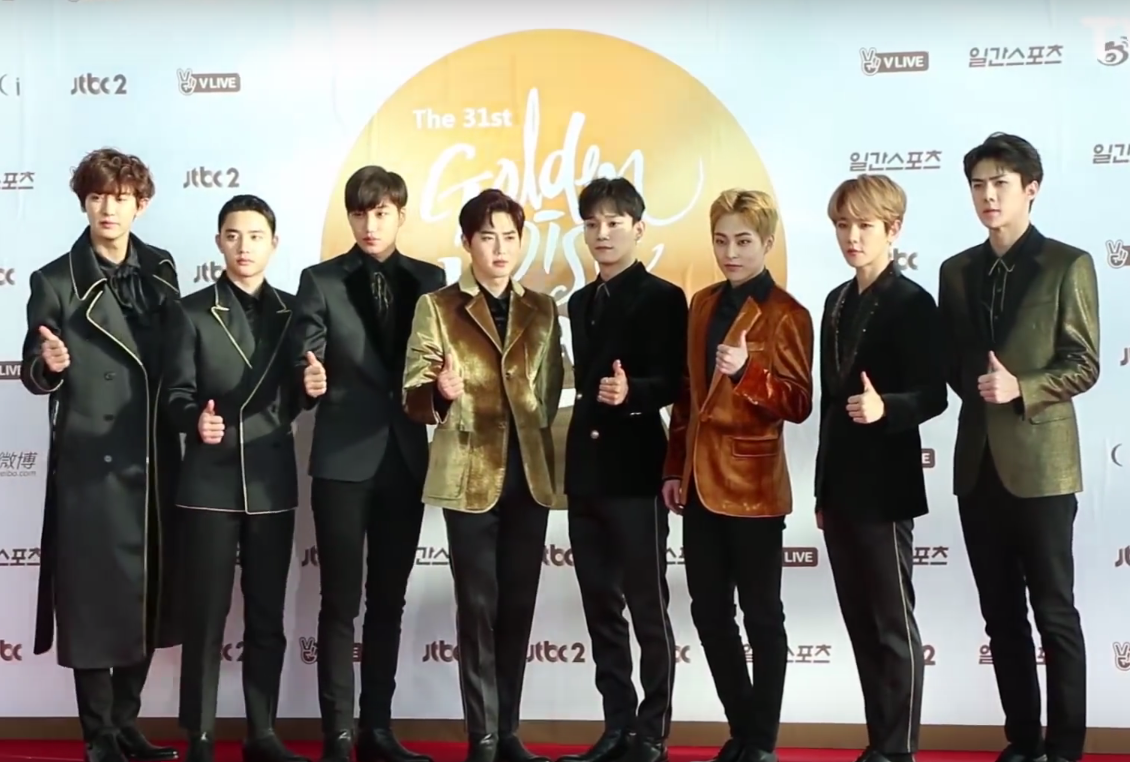
Exo

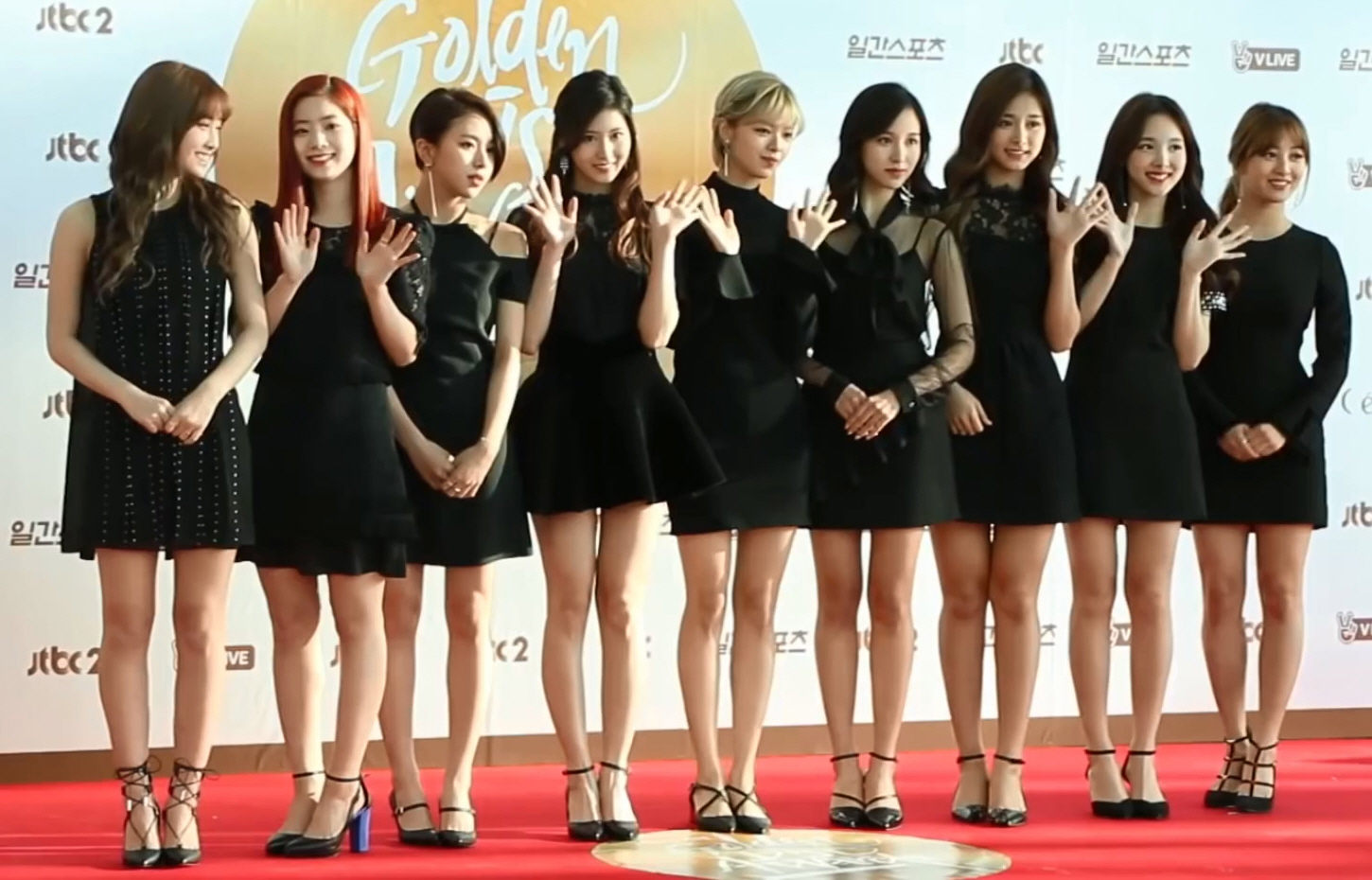
Twice

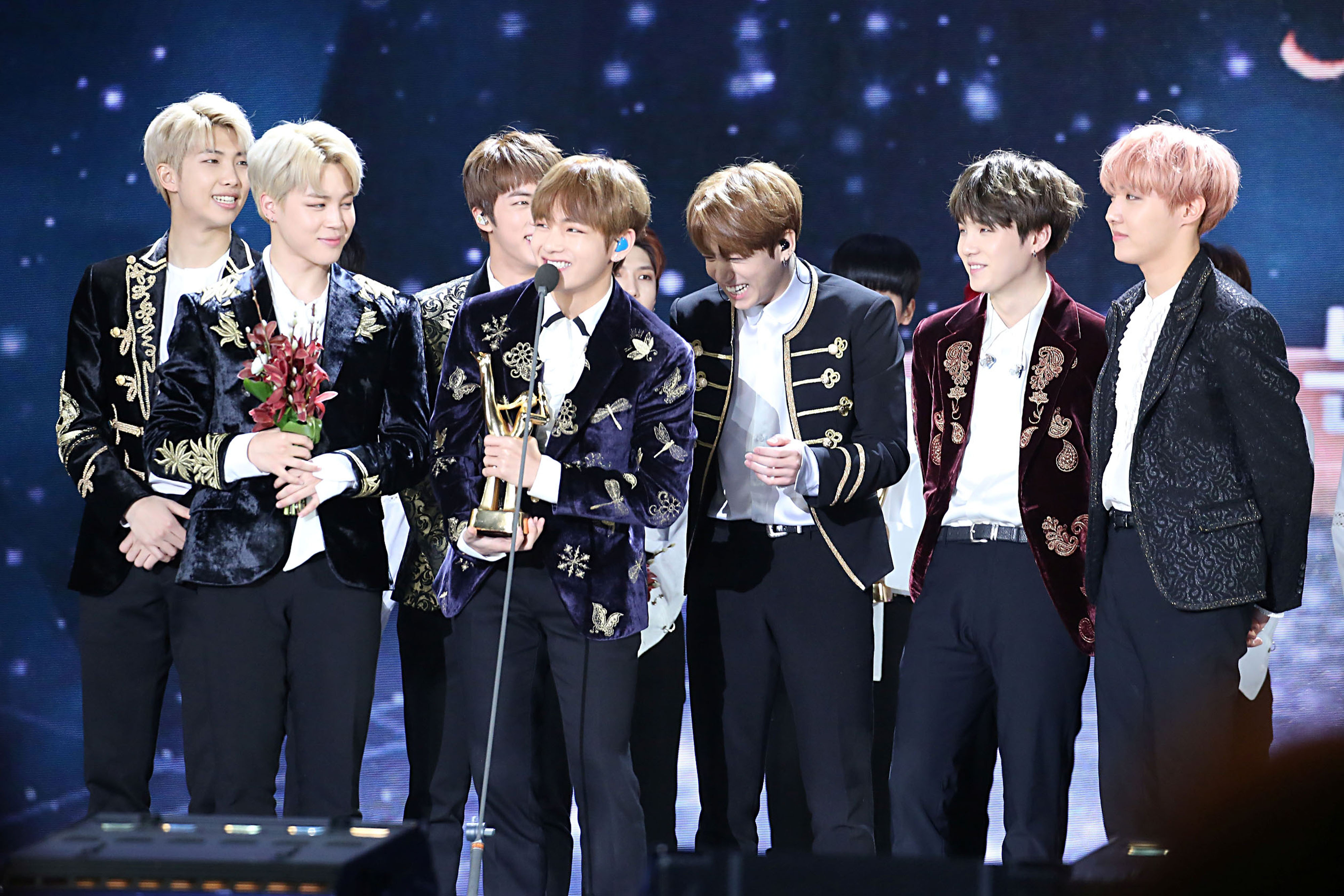
BTS

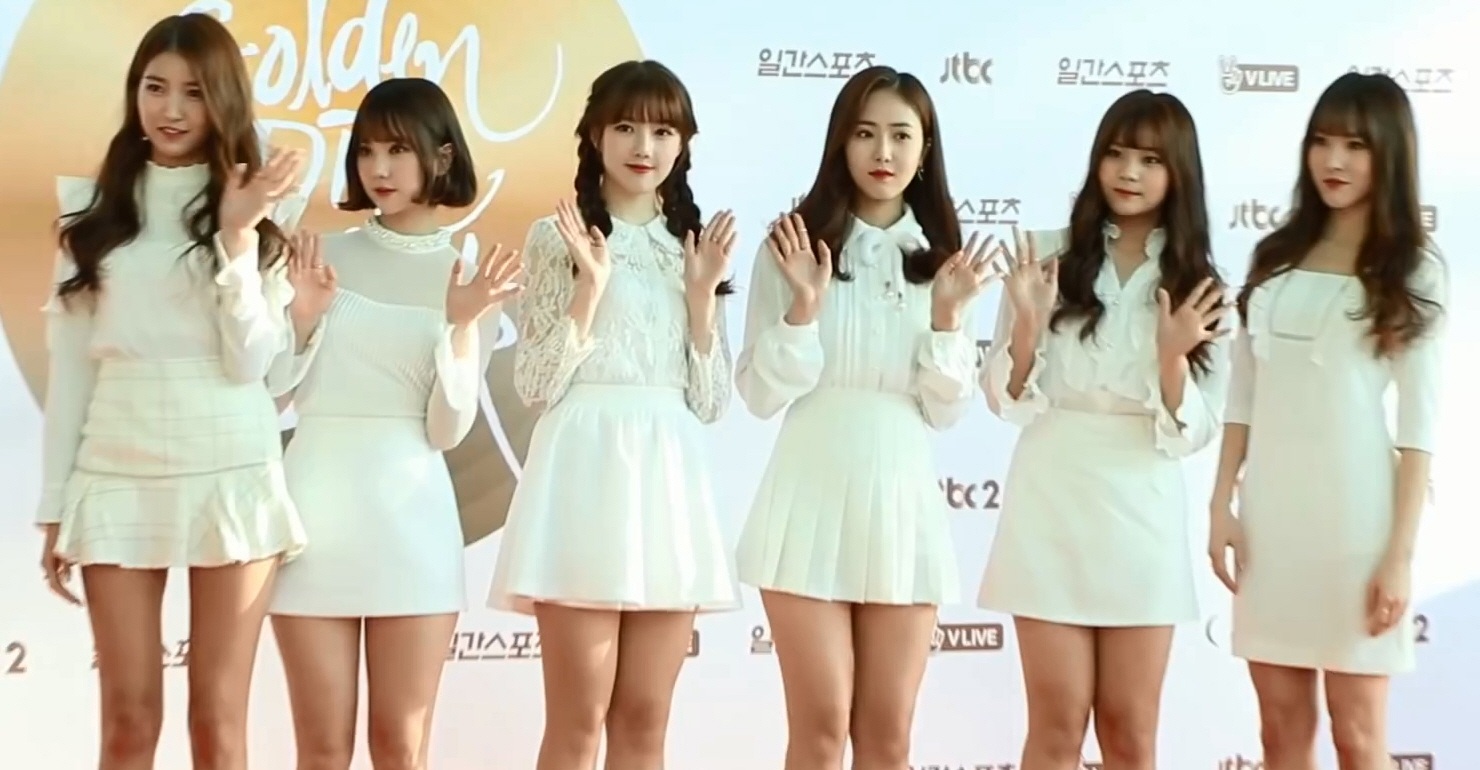
GFriend

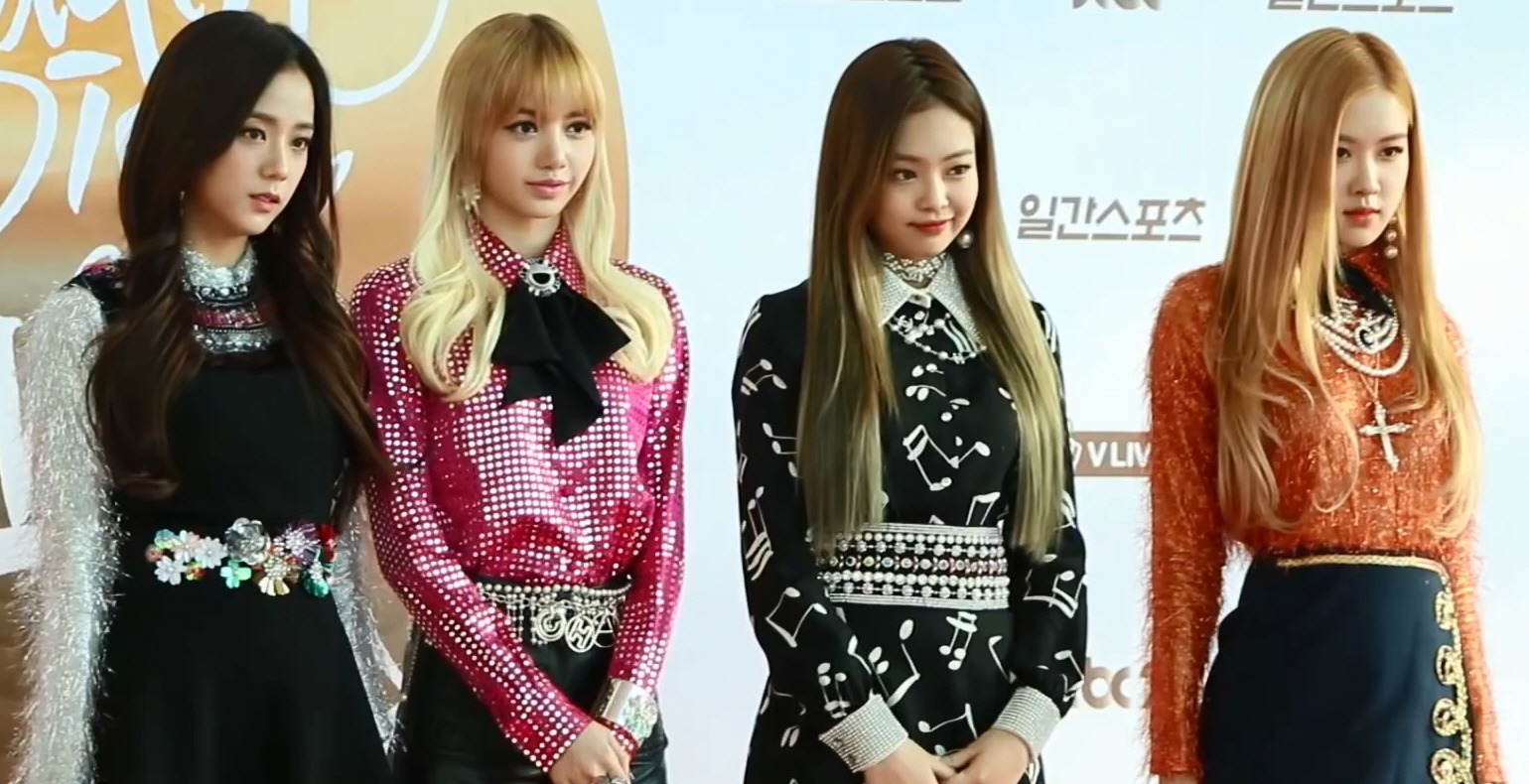
Blackpink

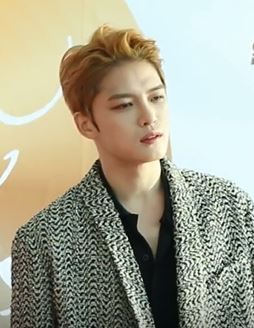
Kim Jae-joong

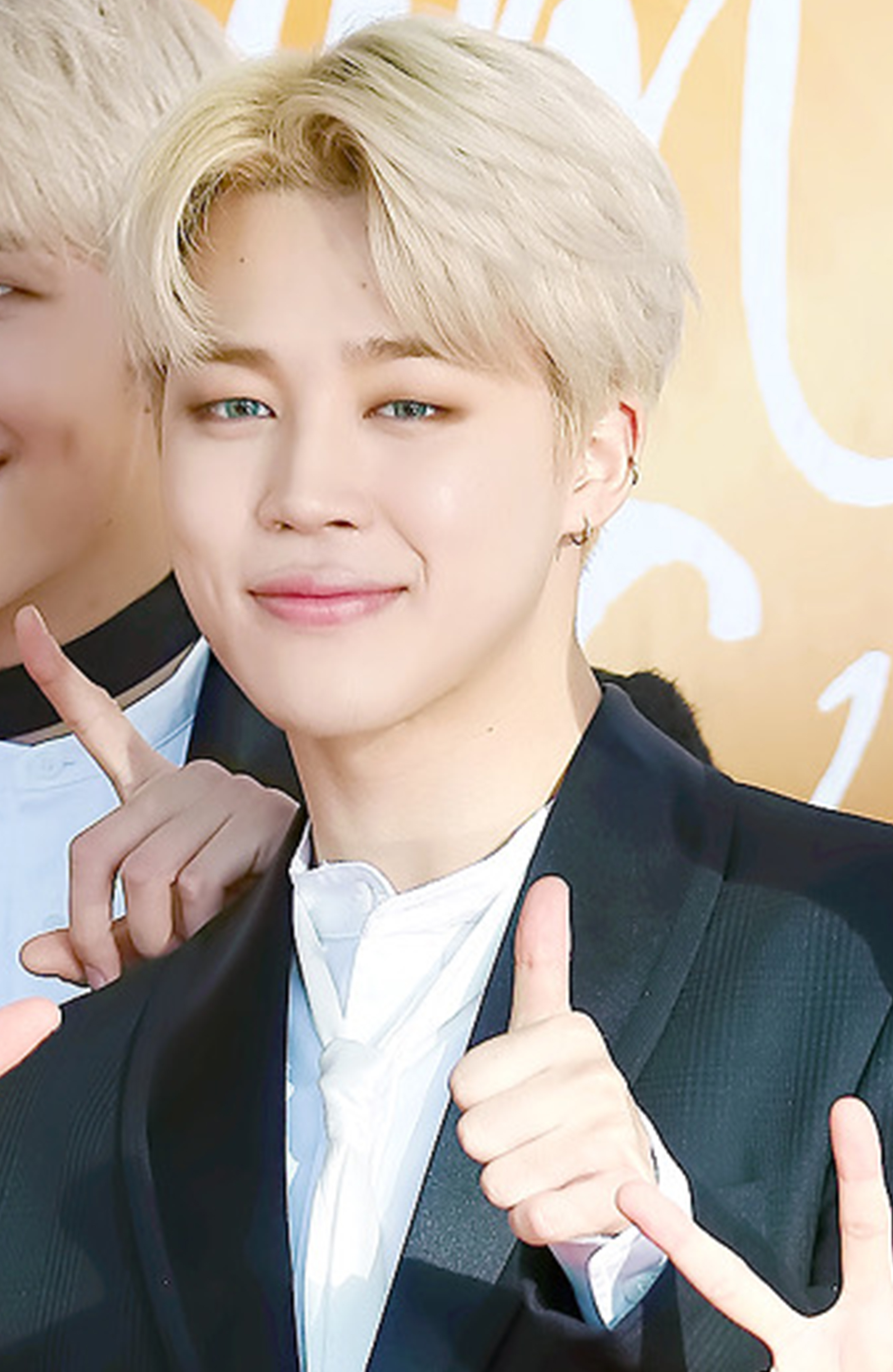
BTS's Jimin

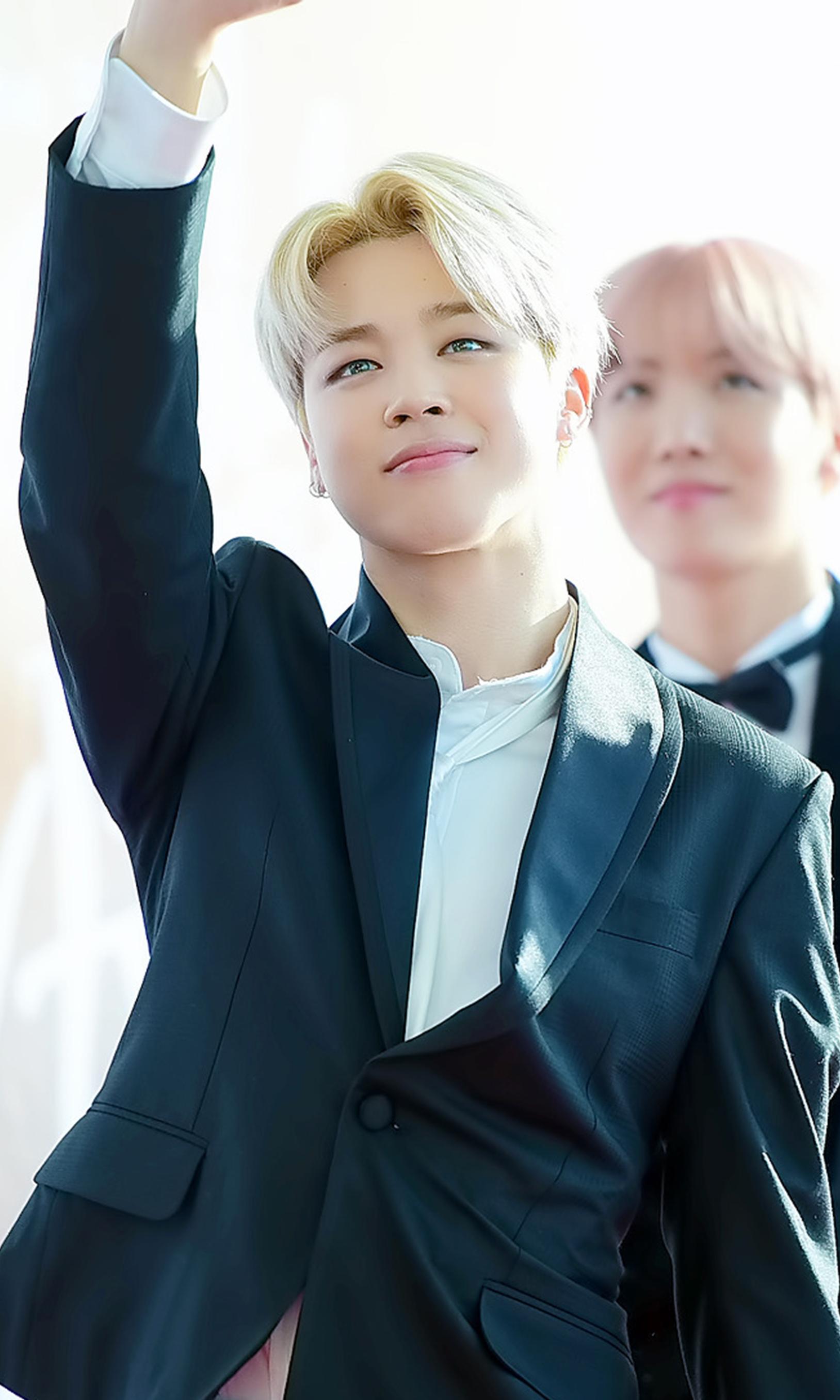
BTS's Jimin

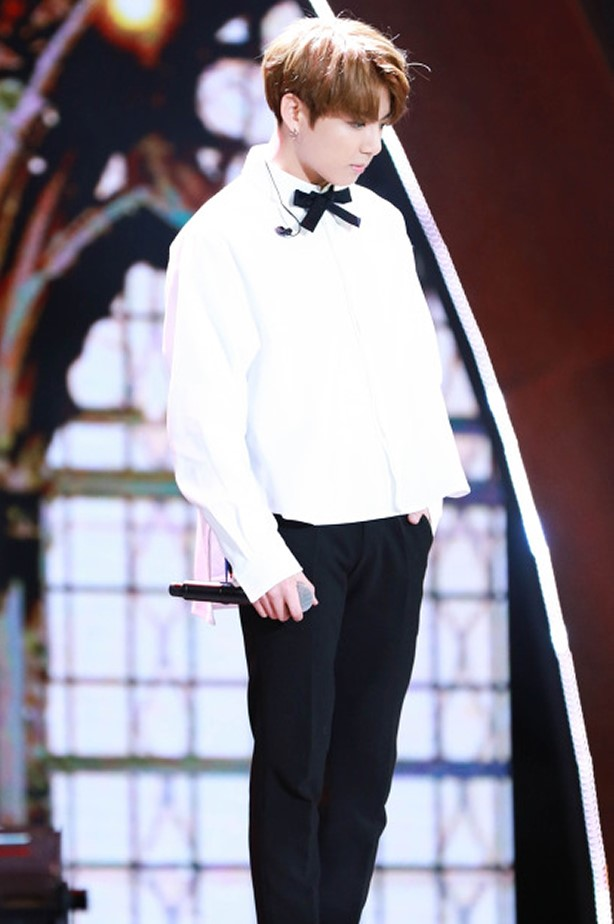
BTS's Jungkook

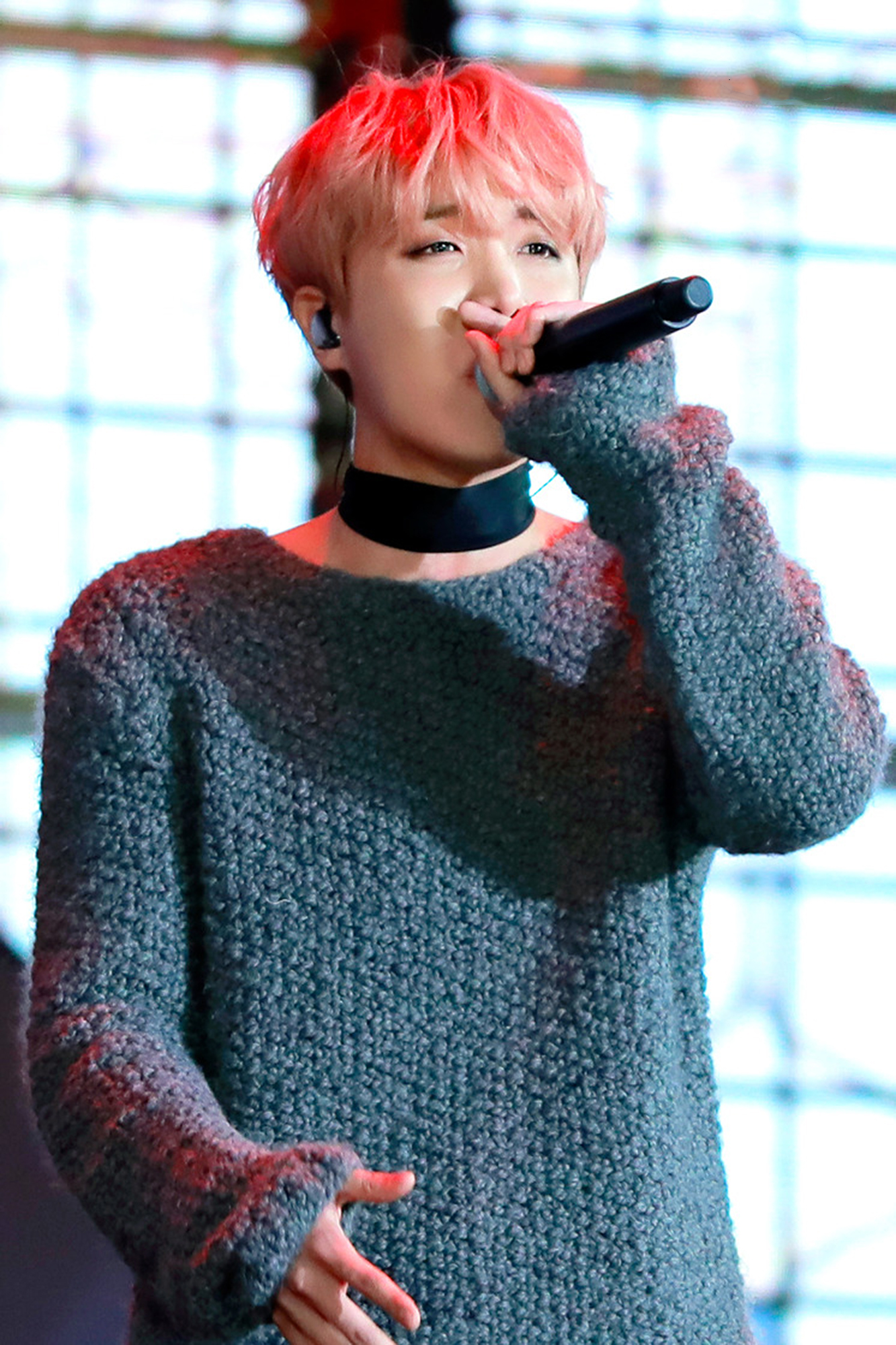
BTS's J-Hope

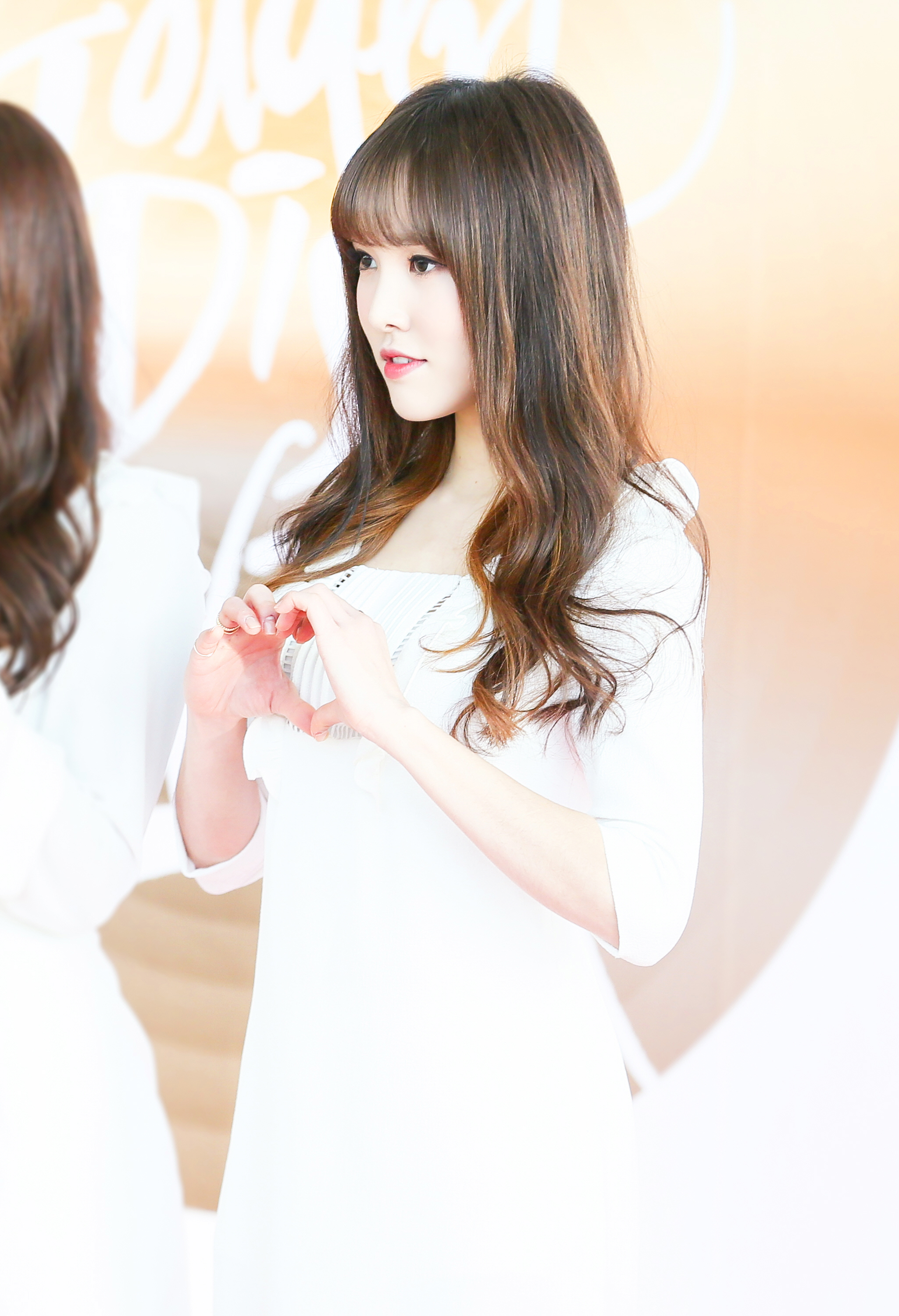
GFriend's Yuju

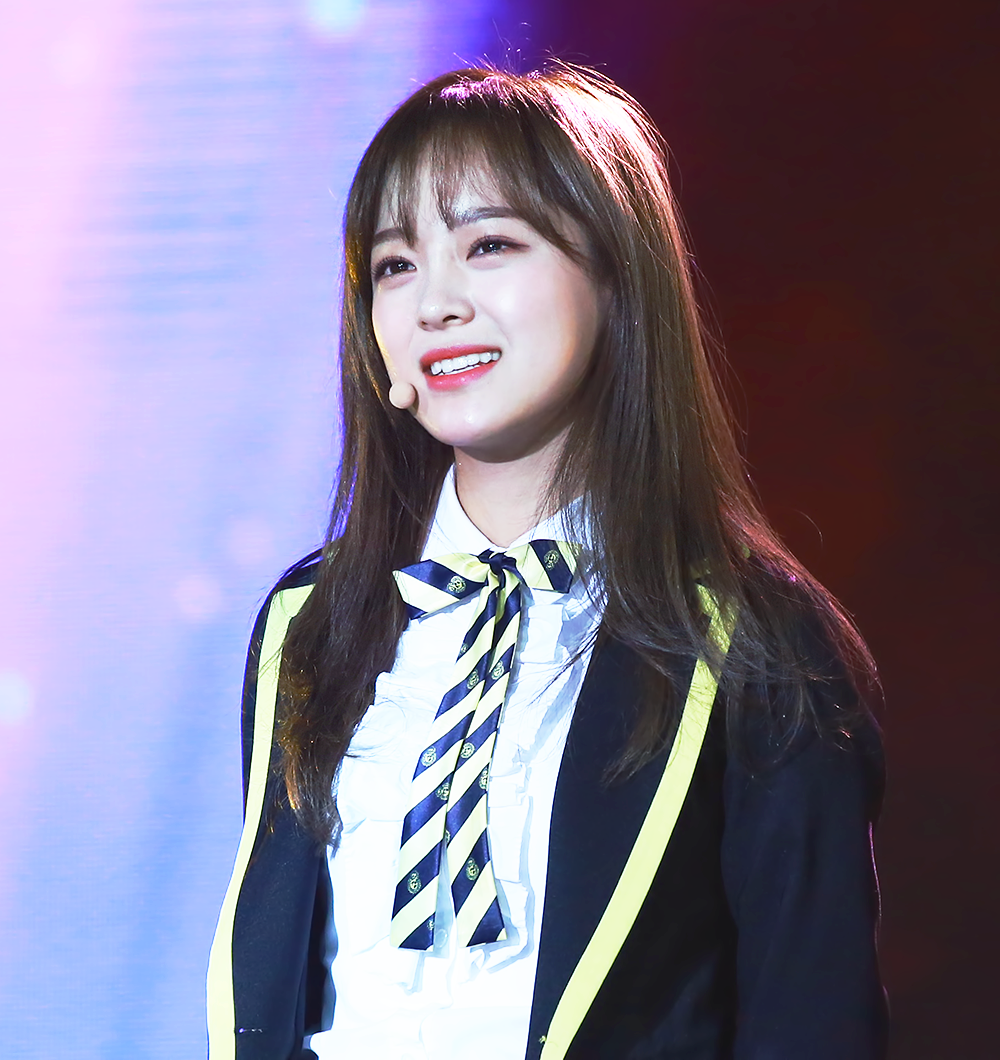
I.O.I's Kim Se-jeong

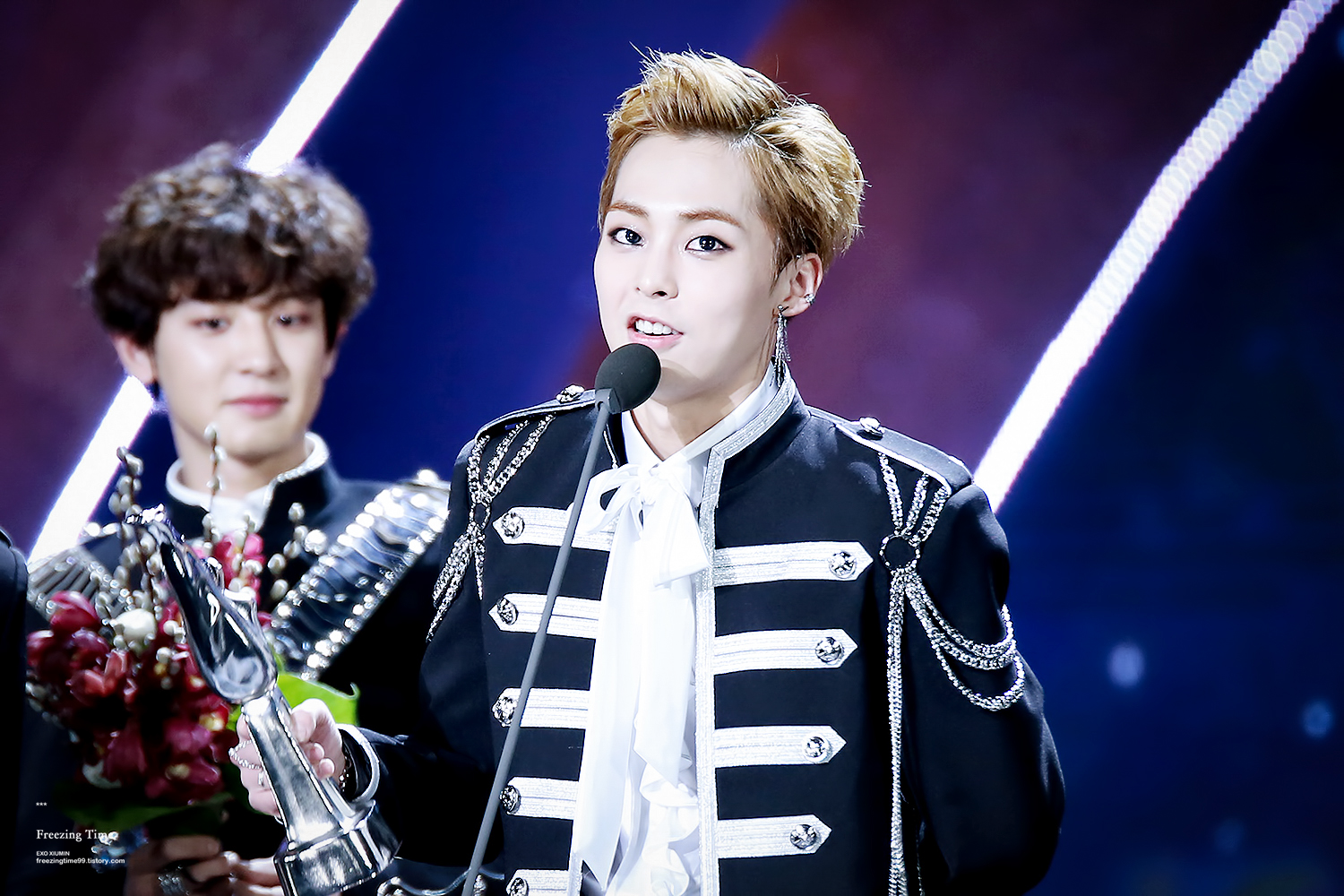
Exo's Xiumin
