= I.O.I =

South Korean girl group

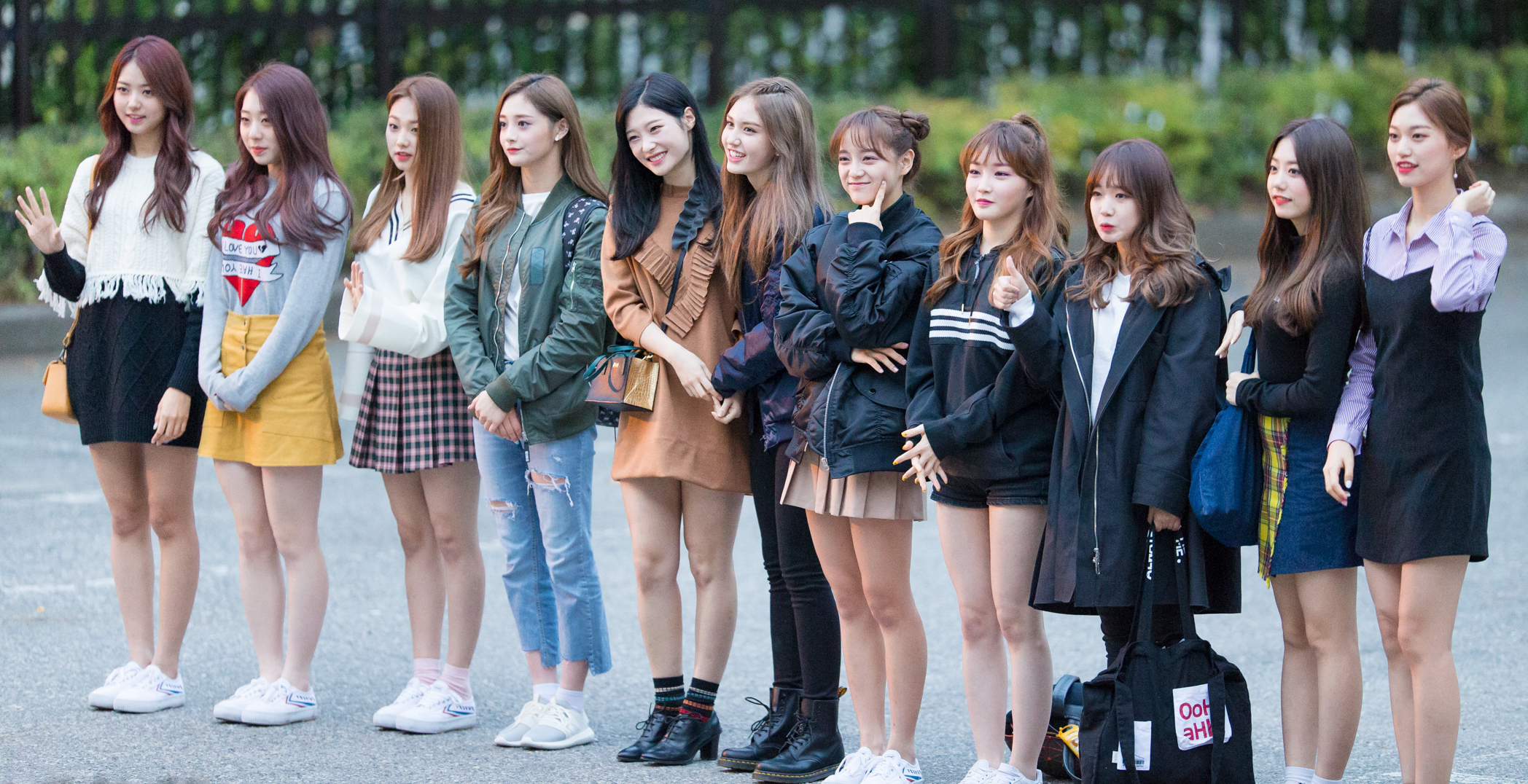
- I.O.I in October 2016; L–R: Nayoung, Yeonjung, Mina, Jieqiong, Chaeyeon, Somi, Sejeong, Chungha, Yoojung, Sohye, and Doyeon

Background information
- Origin: Seoul, South Korea
- Genre: K-pop
- Years active: 2016–2017; 2026–present
- Labels: YMC; CJ E&M; Swing; Studio Blu
- Members: Lim Na-young; Kim Chung-ha; Kim Se-jeong; Jung Chae-yeon; Zhou Jieqiong; Kim So-hye; Yoo Yeon-jung; Choi Yoo-jung; Kang Mi-na; Kim Do-yeon; Jeon So-mi
- Website: Official website

I.O.I (Korean: 아이오아이; also known as IOI or Ideal of Idol) is a South Korean girl group formed by CJ E&M through the 2016 reality show Produce 101 on Mnet. The group was composed of eleven members chosen from a pool of 101 trainees from various entertainment companies: Jeon So-mi, Kim Se-jeong, Choi Yoo-jung, Kim Chung-ha, Kim So-hye, Zhou Jieqiong, Jung Chae-yeon, Kim Do-yeon, Kang Mi-na, Lim Na-young, and Yoo Yeon-jung.

I.O.I debuted on May 4, 2016, with the extended play (EP) Chrysalis and its single "Dream Girls", their first top-ten entry on South Korea's Circle Digital Chart. They followed it with the sub-unit single "Whatta Man" in August, which peaked at number two on the chart. The group released their second EP Miss Me? in October, which spawned the number-one hit "Very Very Very".

In less than one year, I.O.I promoted as a whole of 11 members and a sub-unit of 7 members. Their instant success earned them the Rookie Artist of the Year title at the Golden Disc Awards and the Mnet Asian Music Awards. In January 2017, the group released their single "Downpour" and held the three-day concert Time Slip – I.O.I. They officially disbanded at the end of January as part of their contract and returned to their respective agencies.

In May 2026, I.O.I reunited after nine years in commemoration of their tenth debut anniversary. The group released their third EP I.O.I: Loop and its single "Suddenly", which became their second number-one hit on the Circle Digital Chart. The group embarked on the Asia tour 2026 I.O.I Concert Tour: Loop and earned two awards at the 2026 Melon Music Awards.

== History ==
=== Pre-debut: Produce 101 and "Crush" ===
In November 2015, Mnet announced their new survival show that would bring together 101 trainees from 46 entertainment companies to form a unit girl group with eleven members chosen by the viewers. The show premiered on January 21, 2016, and ended on April 1, 2016.

Prior to Produce 101, some of the members of I.O.I gained recognition after appearing on other television shows: Kim Se-jeong was a contestant on competition show K-pop Star 2 in 2012, Jeon So-mi was a member of the 2015 reality survival show Sixteen, and Choi Yoo-jung appeared in the web drama To Be Continued. In September 2015, Jung Chae-yeon debuted as a member of DIA but temporarily withdrew from the group to join Produce 101. She also had a cameo appearance in the 2015 web drama Sweet Temptation.

It was initially planned for the group to debut on April 1, 2016, with the song "Crush," which they performed as part of the finale of the show, but YMC Entertainment and Mnet decided to postpone the debut to better prepare the group's concept and choreography with a new song as I.O.I's debut single. Its genre was referred to as "Trapical Dutch Funk" (트래피컬 더치 펑크).

On April 3, 2016, a representative gave details of the plans for the debut of the group. Instead of releasing a digital single as initially planned, I.O.I would be releasing an EP with various songs. It was also reported that the group would have their own reality show on Mnet. On the same day, the members greeted the fans for the first time as I.O.I via their official Naver V app channel.

=== Debut with Chrysalis ===
I.O.I officially debuted on May 4, 2016, through the release of their first album, Chrysalis, accompanied with a music video for the title track "Dream Girls". The song is a trap pop dance track co-written by Eru and Paul with rap lyrics written by members Lim Na-young and Choi Yoo-jung. On May 5, the group held their debut stage on Mnet's M Countdown, performing the title track and "Knock Knock Knock". On the same day, the group held their debut showcase and fan meeting at Jangchung Gymnasium in Seoul.

=== "Whatta Man" and "Hand in Hand" ===
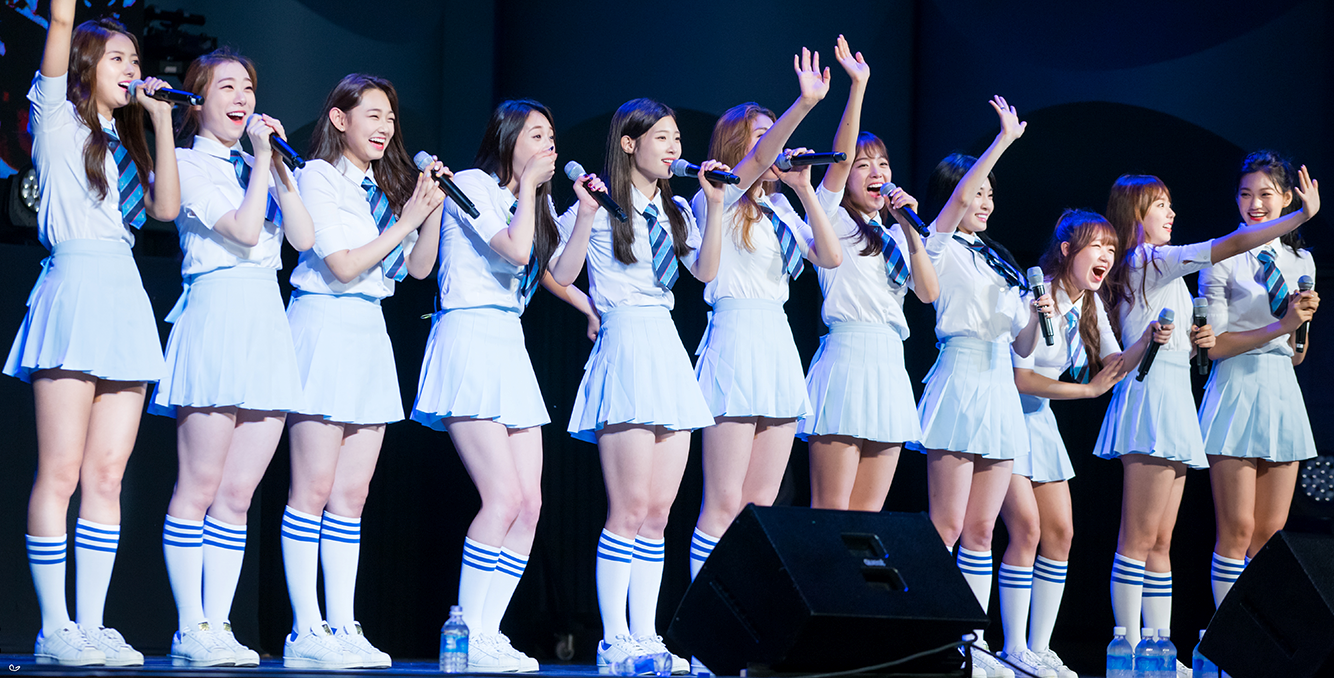
I.O.I on July 16, 2016

On June 10, 2016, YMC Entertainment revealed Lim Na-young, Chungha, Zhou Jieqiong, Kim So-hye, Choi Yoo-jung, Kim Do-yeon and Jeon So-mi as members of I.O.I's unit group, slated to promote the group's second album during the summer of 2016. Jung Chae-yeon joined her MBK Entertainment group DIA for a comeback, Kim Se-jeong and Kang Mi-na were preparing for their debut as members of Jellyfish Entertainment's girl group Gugudan at the time, and Yoo Yeon-jung was added into Starship Entertainment's girl group WJSN for their second comeback.

On August 9, 2016, the sub-unit released a single titled "Whatta Man (Good Man)". The song was inspired by Linda Lyndell's "What a Man" and was produced by Ryan S. Jhun who also composed I.O.I's song "Crush". The choreography for "Whatta Man" was arranged by member Chungha.

On August 15, 2016, I.O.I released the digital single "Hand in Hand", a remake of the Seoul 1988 Summer Olympics theme song originally sung by Koreana.

=== Miss Me? ===
On October 17, 2016, I.O.I released their extended play titled Miss Me?. The title track, "Very Very Very", was written, composed and arranged by Park Jin-young, founder of Jeon So-mi's agency JYP Entertainment. With a rhythm of 206 bpm, the upbeat and energetic song is one of the fastest that Park has ever made. The group's special comeback show titled I Miss You Very Very Very Much Show was aired live through Mnet on October 16, 2016, followed by the release of Miss Me? and the title track's music video at midnight.

I.O.I received their first music program trophy as a whole group with "Very Very Very" on Show Champion on October 26.

=== Final activities, concert and disbandment ===
On November 5, 2016, YMC Entertainment confirmed that I.O.I would be disbanding on January 31, 2017. The group would still be actively promoting until the end of their contracts; including guest appearance on variety shows such as Immortal Songs: Singing the Legend, Yang and Nam Show and Knowing Bros. From January 20 to 22, 2017, I.O.I held their final concert titled Time Slip – I.O.I. The three-day concert was held in Jangchung Gymnasium, where the group held their debut showcase.

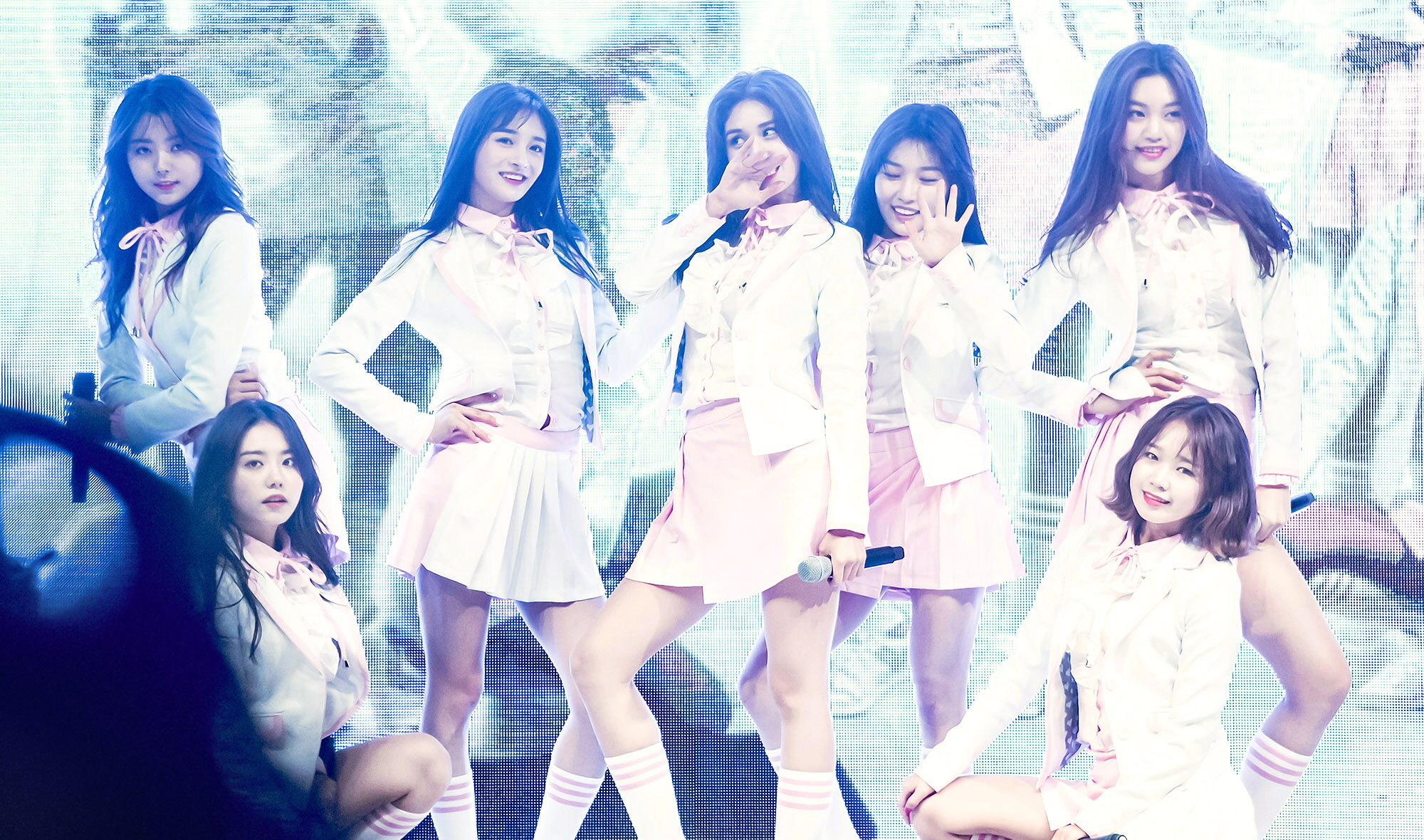
I.O.I's unit group in December 2016

On January 10, 2017, it was revealed that I.O.I had received songs from various producers and songwriters as potential songs for their final release, including B1A4's Jinyoung. On January 17, YMC Entertainment announced that the group's final track before official disbandment would be "Downpour", written and co-produced by Seventeen's Woozi. The ballad was personally chosen and recorded by all eleven members of the group. The digital single and its music video was released the next day at midnight.

I.O.I's last schedule as a group was on January 25, 2017. They filmed a new CF for school uniform brand Elite along with boy group Pentagon. The band officially disbanded on January 29, with the members' last television show appearance on MBC's Section TV and the fan cafe closing down on the 31st. It was also announced on January 31 that I.O.I's song "Downpour" won Inkigayo's final January 2017 trophy with no live broadcast due to Lunar New Year's Day.

=== Subsequent reunions and I.O.I: Loop ===
On July 1, 2019, Studio Blu confirmed that the group would return in October 2019 with nine members, excluding Yoo Yeon-jung and Jeon So-mi. On September 6, the planned comeback was postponed to December. On October 29, the comeback was canceled due to scheduling conflicts between the members and the ongoing Mnet vote manipulation investigation. On May 4, 2021, the 5th anniversary of the group's debut, the group held a reunion livestream. Mina was absent from the stream, while Jieqiong joined via video call.

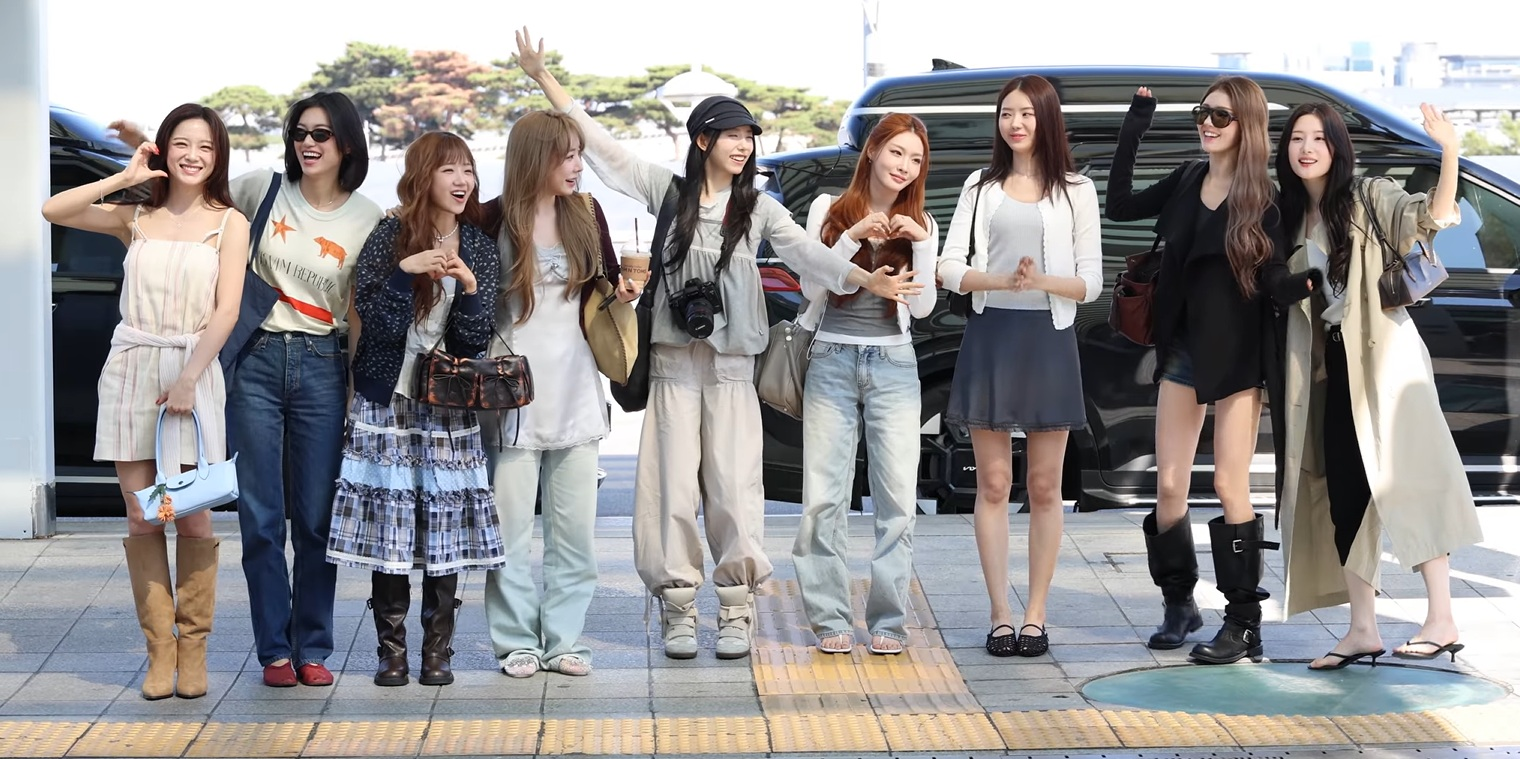
I.O.I leaving Incheon Airport in June 2026

On February 23, 2026, Swing Entertainment announced that the group will reunite for a new album release in May, without Mina, due to pre-scheduled acting commitments, and Jieqiong. Swing also confirmed that they will manage the group's promotional activities for the album and their 10th anniversary. On April 21, Swing Entertainment announced that I.O.I's third extended play I.O.I: Loop would be released on May 19. The pre-release single "Goodbye with a Smile", produced by singer-songwriter Jinyoung and recorded in 2016, was released on May 4. In May and June, I.O.I embarked on their Asia tour 2026 I.O.I Concert Tour: Loop, which had stops in Seoul, Bangkok, and Hong Kong.

== Members ==
- Lim Na-young (임나영) – leader
- Kim Chung-ha (김청하)
- Kim Se-jeong (김세정)
- Jung Chae-yeon (정채연)
- Zhou Jieqiong (주결경)
- Kim So-hye (김소혜)
- Yoo Yeon-jung (유연정)
- Choi Yoo-jung (최유정)
- Kang Mi-na (강미나)
- Kim Do-yeon (김도연)
- Jeon So-mi (전소미)

=== Sub-unit ===
- I.O.I sub-unit – Nayoung, Chungha, Jieqiong, Sohye, Yoojung, Doyeon, and Somi

== Discography ==
=== Extended plays ===
List of extended plays, with selected chart positions and sales
| Title | Details | Peak chart positions | | | Sales |
| Title | Details | KOR | JPN DL | US World | Sales |
|---|---|---|---|---|---|
| Chrysalis | Released: May 4, 2016; Label: YMC Entertainment; Formats: CD, digital download, streaming | 4 | — | — | KOR: 87,026; JPN: 303; US: 1,000 |
| Miss Me? | Released: October 17, 2016; Label: YMC Entertainment; Formats: CD, digital download, streaming | 2 | — | 11 | KOR: 106,439; JPN: 1,322 |
| I.O.I: Loop | Released: May 19, 2026; Label: Swing Entertainment; Formats: CD, digital download, streaming | 15 | 70 | — | KOR: 38,943 |
"—" denotes releases that did not chart or were not released in that region.

=== Singles ===
List of singles, with selected chart positions, showing year released and album name
| Title | Year | Peak chart positions | | | | | | | | | | Sales | Album |
| Title | Year | KOR | KOR Album | KOR Hot | HK | JPN Hot | NZ Hot | SGP | TWN | US World | WW | Sales | Album |
|---|---|---|---|---|---|---|---|---|---|---|---|---|---|
| "Crush" | 2016 | 12 | — | — | — | — | — | — | — | — | — | KOR: 344,126 | Chrysalis |
| "Dream Girls" | 2016 | 7 | — | — | — | — | — | — | — | — | — | KOR: 652,321 | Chrysalis |
| "Whatta Man (Good Man)" | 2016 | 2 | 2 | — | — | — | — | — | — | 9 | — | KOR: 78,535 (Phy.); KOR: 371,336 | Non-album singles |
| "Hand in Hand" (손에 손잡고) | 2016 | 139 | 6 | — | — | — | — | — | — | — | — | KOR: 4,039 (Phy.) | Non-album singles |
| "Very Very Very" (너무너무너무) | 2016 | 1 | — | 98 | — | 80 | — | — | — | 4 | — | KOR: 1,319,944 | Miss Me? |
| "Downpour" (소나기) | 2017 | 3 | — | 39 | — | — | — | — | — | — | — | KOR: 1,112,589; US: 2,000 | Non-album single |
| "Goodbye with a Smile" (웃으며 안녕) | 2026 | — (Note: "Goodbye with a Smile" did not enter the Circle Digital Chart, but peaked at number 10 on the component Circle Download Chart.) | — | * | — | — | — | — | — | — | — | —N/a | I.O.I: Loop |
| "Suddenly" (갑자기) | 2026 | 1 | — | * | 19 | — | 22 | 23 | 17 | — | 136 | —N/a | I.O.I: Loop |
"—" denotes releases that did not chart or were not released in that region. "*" denotes that chart did not exist at that time.

=== Promotional singles ===
| Title | Year | Album |
|---|---|---|
| "Together as One" (with various artists) | 2016 | Hooxi, The Beginning |

=== Soundtrack appearances ===
| Title | Year | Peak chart position | Sales | Album |
| Title | Year | KOR | Sales | Album |
|---|---|---|---|---|
| "I Love You, I Remember You" (사랑해 기억해) | 2016 | 30 | KOR: 133,463 | Moon Lovers: Scarlet Heart Ryeo OST Part 3 |

=== Other charted songs ===
| Title | Year | Peak chart positions | Sales | Album |
| Title | Year | KOR | Sales | Album |
|---|---|---|---|---|
| "When the Cherry Blossoms Fade" (벚꽃이 지면) | 2016 | 16 | KOR: 448,325 | Chrysalis |
| "Knock Knock Knock" (똑 똑 똑) | 2016 | 31 | KOR: 154,934 | Chrysalis |
| "Doo Wap" | 2016 | 45 | KOR: 82,081 | Chrysalis |
| "Pick Me" | 2016 | 93 | KOR: 33,968 | Chrysalis |
| "Hold On" (잠깐만) | 2016 | 10 | KOR: 221,111 | Miss Me? |
| "More More" (내 말대로 해줘) | 2016 | 61 | KOR: 38,268 | Miss Me? |
| "Ping Pong" | 2016 | 77 | KOR: 33,131 | Miss Me? |
| "M-Maybe" (음 어쩌면) | 2016 | 86 | KOR: 31,583 | Miss Me? |
| "IOI (Where My Girls At)" | 2026 | — (Note: "IOI (Where My Girls At)" did not enter the Circle Digital Chart, but peaked at number 28 on the component Circle Download Chart.) | —N/a | I.O.I: Loop |
| "SPF 100+ (Summer Pop Fantasy)" | 2026 | — (Note: "SPF 100+ (Summer Pop Fantasy)" did not enter the Circle Digital Chart, but peaked at number 32 on the component Circle Download Chart.) | —N/a | I.O.I: Loop |
| "If I" | 2026 | — (Note: "If I" did not enter the Circle Digital Chart, but peaked at number 30 on the component Circle Download Chart.) | —N/a | I.O.I: Loop |
| "Then, Now, and Forever" (그떄 우리 지금) | 2026 | — (Note: "Then, Now, and Forever" did not enter the Circle Digital Chart, but peaked at number 29 on the component Circle Download Chart.) | —N/a | I.O.I: Loop |

=== Compilation appearances ===
| Title | Year | Album | Track No. |
|---|---|---|---|
| "It's Fire Play" (불놀이야) | 2016 | Immortal Song 2: Singing the Legend (Hong Seo-bum) | 4 |
| "All That Time" (그럴 땐) | 2016 | Immortal Song 2: Singing the Legend (Poets' Songs Special) | 2 |
| "Together as One" | 2016 | Hooxi, The Beginning | 1 |

== Videography ==
=== Music videos ===
| Title | Year | Director(s) | Ref. |
|---|---|---|---|
| "Crush" | 2016 | Unknown | |
| "Dream Girls" | 2016 | Hong Won-ki | |
| "Whatta Man (Good Man)" | 2016 | Hong Won-ki | |
| "Very Very Very" | 2016 | Digipedi | |
| "Together as One" | 2016 | Unknown | |
| "Downpour" | 2017 | Unknown | |
| "Suddenly" | 2026 | Soobin Park | |

== Concert ==
- Time Slip – I.O.I (2017)
- I.O.I Concert Tour: LOOP (2026)

== Filmography ==
=== Reality shows ===
- Produce 101 (2016)
- Standby I.O.I (2016)
- LAN Cable Friends I.O.I (2016)
- I Miss You Very Very Very Much Show (2016)

== Endorsements ==
It was reported on March 24, 2016, that even before the finale of Produce 101, the group already confirmed seven CF deals for different companies with an estimated profit of ₩1.4 billion.

On April 4, 2016, I.O.I was appointed as new model for Etude House, Mom's Touch Chicken and Burger, Woongjin Foods' Haneul Bori Ice Sparkling Water and HiteJinro's Chamisul. However, due to the legal drinking age in South Korea, only three members, Lim Na-young, Chungha and Kim Se-jeong, were involved in filming of the ad for a new alcoholic beverage by distiller HiteJinro.

On April 11, 2016, I.O.I was chosen as the advertising model for mobile games from Netmarble, 100 Shots 100 Hits and StoneAge. They also sang the OST of the games. The next day, the group was confirmed as the new endorser for SK Telecom, South Korea's largest wireless carrier.

I.O.I also endorsed CJ CheilJedang's dessert brand Petitzel Eclairs and Korean fashion brand Pancoat.

On May 25, 2016, I.O.I was appointed as the promotional models for KB Kookmin Bank, one of the largest banks in South Korea. On June 7, 2016, the group was chosen as the exclusive models of online marketplace Auction.

On August 18, 2016, school uniform brand Elite announced their collaboration with I.O.I and Pentagon as their new models.

== Accolades ==
=== Awards and nominations ===
Name of the award ceremony, year presented, category, nominee of the award, and the result of the nomination
| Award ceremony | Year | Category | Nominee / work | Result | Ref. |
|---|---|---|---|---|---|
| Asia Artist Awards | 2016 | Most Popular Artists (Singer) – Top 50 | I.O.I | 13th | |
| Asia Model Awards | 2016 | New Star Award | I.O.I | Won | |
| Gaon Chart Music Awards | 2017 | Song of the Year (October) | "Very Very Very" | Nominated | |
| Gaon Chart Music Awards | 2018 | Song of the Year (January) | "Downpour" | Nominated | |
| Golden Disc Awards | 2017 | Rookie Artist Award | I.O.I | Won | |
| Golden Disc Awards | 2017 | Popularity Award | I.O.I | Nominated | |
| Golden Disc Awards | 2017 | Asian Choice Popularity Award | I.O.I | Nominated | |
| Golden Disc Awards | 2017 | Digital Bonsang | "Very Very Very" | Nominated | |
| Golden Disc Awards | 2017 | Disc Bonsang | Chrysalis | Nominated | |
| Korean Culture Entertainment Awards | 2016 | K-pop Singer Award | I.O.I | Won | |
| Melon Music Awards | 2016 | Top 10 Artists | I.O.I | Nominated | |
| Melon Music Awards | 2016 | Best New Artist | I.O.I | Nominated | |
| Melon Music Awards | 2016 | Netizen Popularity Award | I.O.I | Nominated | |
| Melon Music Awards | 2016 | Kakao Hot Star Award | I.O.I | Nominated | |
| Melon Music Awards | 2017 | Top 10 Artists | I.O.I | Nominated | |
| Melon Music Awards | 2017 | Hot Trend Award | "Downpour" | Nominated | |
| Melon Music Awards | 2026 | Top 10 Artists | I.O.I | Won | |
| Melon Music Awards | 2026 | Best Music Style | I.O.I | Won | |
| Melon Music Awards | 2026 | Artist of the Year | I.O.I | Nominated | |
| Melon Music Awards | 2026 | Album of the Year | I.O.I: Loop | Nominated | |
| Melon Music Awards | 2026 | Song of the Year | "Suddenly" | Nominated | |
| Mnet Asian Music Awards | 2016 | Best New Artist – Female Group | I.O.I | Won | |
| Mnet Asian Music Awards | 2016 | Artist of the Year | I.O.I | Longlisted | |
| Mnet Asian Music Awards | 2016 | Worldwide Favorite Artist | I.O.I | Nominated | |
| Seoul Music Awards | 2017 | Bonsang Award | I.O.I | Nominated | |
| Seoul Music Awards | 2017 | New Artist Award | I.O.I | Won | |
| Seoul Music Awards | 2017 | Popularity Award | I.O.I | Nominated | |
| Seoul Music Awards | 2017 | Hallyu Special Award | I.O.I | Nominated | |
| V Live Awards | 2017 | Global Rookie Top 5 | I.O.I | Won | |

=== Listicles ===
Name of publisher, year listed, name of listicle, and placement
| Publisher | Year | Listicle | Placement | Ref. |
|---|---|---|---|---|
| Forbes | 2017 | Korea Power Celebrity 40 | 11th | |
