= Whatta Man (I.O.I song) =

Single by I.O.I
- Released: August 9, 2016
- Length: 3:13
- Label: YMC; LOEN
- Composers: Emile Ghantous; Steve Daly; Keith Hetrick; Ryan S. Jhun; Michel Schulz; Fritz Michallik
- Lyricists: Nikki Flores; Philip Bentley; Seo Jeonga
- Producers: Ryan S. Jhun; Emile Ghantous; Steve Daly; Keith Hetrick; Fritz Michallik; Michel Sebastian Maximilian Schulz

I.O.I singles chronology
"Dream Girls" (2016)	"Whatta Man" (2016)	"Very Very Very" (2016)

Music videos
- "Whatta Man (YMC)" on YouTube
- "Whatta Man (Stone)" on YouTube

"Whatta Man" (also known as "Whatta Man (Good Man)") is a 2016 song recorded by South Korean girl group project I.O.I. The song was released as a single album by the first sub-unit of the group, with members Nayoung, Chungha, Kyulkyung, Sohye, Yoojung, Doyeon and Somi. It was released as a digital download by YMC Entertainment and distributed by LOEN Entertainment on August 9, 2016 and as a physical single on August 11. The lyrics were written by Nikki Flores, Phillip Bentley, and Seo Jeonga and the music was composed by Emile Ghantous, Steve Daly, Keith Hetrick, Ryan S. Jhun, Michel Schulz, and Fritz Michallik, with additional background vocals from Nikki Flores and Melanie Fontana. The song samples the 1968 song "What a Man" by Linda Lyndell. Choreography for the song was created by member Chungha. To promote the single album, I.O.I's unit performed the song on several South Korean music programs, including M Countdown and Music Bank. A music video for the title track was also released on August 9.

The single album was a commercial success peaking at number 2 on the Gaon Digital Chart and on the Gaon Album Chart, for its digital (downloads and streaming) and physical sales respectively. It sold over 64,922 physical copies and 368,469 digital downloads by September 2016. The single album sold 69,076 physical copies in 2016.

== Background and release ==
On May 27, 2016, YMC Entertainment revealed the upcoming I.O.I promotions plans, stating that the group will be starting solo and unit group promotions in the summer with no further details. On June 4 more information about the unit was released. YMC stated "We are in the final stage of deciding on the unit group members. We will announce the unit group members on the official site this week." Later, on June 7 it was revealed that a release was expected to late July or the first week of August and that I.O.I's members Yoo Yeonjung, Jung Chaeyeon, Kim Sejeong and Kang Mina will not be part of the unit. It was also stated that the first creative process begun, choosing songs as the potential title track. On June 9 it was officially announced that the unit will be composed of seven members: Kim Doyeon, Kim Sohye, Kim Chungha, Lim Nayoung, Jeon Somi, Zhou Jieqiong and Choi Yoojung. It was also stated that member Yoo Yeonjung will return to her agency to continue her training process. On June 24 the agency announced that the song will be released in August, stating "They are [I.O.I's unit] engrossed in lessons and choreography practice. There is a lot of time for them to rest in between practice. Because we don't have the two main vocals, the members are putting a lot of effort into their singing practice as well."

On July 29 the release date was set to August 9 at midnight KST, revealing the first teaser image with the words "WXAXTX X XAN" on August 1. On August 3, the first music video teaser was released. On August 5 the second teaser images were released in two groups, the first with members Nayoung, Somi, Jieqiong and Doyeon and the second with members Sohye, Chungha and Yoojung, dressed in black leather outfits with a dark background. Three days later, on August 8 the third and final teaser image was released, with the full unit in a white background, as the single album cover.

"Whatta Man (Good man)" was released as a digital download on August 9, 2016 at midnight KST through several music portals in conjunction with the music video. Two days later, on August 11, a physical single was released.

== Music video ==
On August 3, 2016 the first and only music video teaser was released, showing close-ups of each member from the unit with the chorus being played. On August 9, the official music video was released through the 1theK YouTube channel and also on the label's official channel. The music video centers on member Yoojung and how the others members encourage her to leave her boyfriend, changing her look and attitude.

The video features Younghoon of The Boyz as Yoojung's boyfriend.

The music video for "Whatta Man" was the third and second most viewed video in the United States and Worldwide respectively, according to Billboard for the month of August 2016.

== Promotion ==
In order to promote the single album, I.O.I's unit had their first comeback stage on Mnet's M Countdown on August 11, 2016 where they perform the song. They continued the performances on KBS's Music Bank on August 12, on SBS MTV's The Show on August 16 and for the very first time as a group and unit on MBC Music's Show Champion on August 17.

I.O.I received their first-ever win on a music show as a group and sub-group on The Show on August 16, followed by Show Champion on August 17, M Countdown on August 18, Music Bank on August 19 and again on The Show on August 30 for "Whatta Man", for a total of five trophies.

== Commercial performance ==
Whatta Man entered and peaked at number 2 on the Gaon Album Chart on the chart issue dated August 7–13, 2016 for the physical sales of the single album. In its second week, the album placed at number 4 on the chart. In its third week, the album fell to number 9, staying in the Top 10 of the chart. In its fourth week, the album fell to number 33, the lowest place since the debut.

The album entered at number 4 on the Gaon Album Chart for the month of August 2016 with 61,632 physical copies sold.

The single album placed at number 41 on the Gaon Album Chart for the year-end 2016 with 69,076 physical copies sold.

"Whatta Man" entered and peaked at number 2 on the Gaon Digital Chart on the chart issue dated August 7–13, 2016 with 128,760 downloads sold and 2,752,097 streams. In its second week, the song fell to number 5 with 67,712 downloads sold and 2,516,434 streams. In its third week, the song fell to number 16 with 45,357 downloads sold and 2,516,434 streams. In its fourth week, the song fell to number 24, being for the first time since release out of the Top 20.

The song entered at number 9 on the Gaon Digital Chart for the month of August 2016 with 261,320 downloads sold and 1,744,207 streams.

== Awards and nominations ==
=== Music program awards ===
Song	Program	Date
"Whatta Man"	The Show (SBS MTV)	August 16, 2016
"Whatta Man"	The Show (SBS MTV)	August 30, 2016
"Whatta Man"	Show Champion (MBC Music)	August 17, 2016
"Whatta Man"	M! Countdown (Mnet)	August 18, 2016
"Whatta Man"	Music Bank (KBS)	August 19, 2016

== Charts ==
=== Weekly charts ===
Chart (2016)	Peak position
South Korea (Gaon Digital Chart)	2
South Korea (Gaon Album Chart)	2

=== Monthly charts ===
Chart (2016)	Peak position
South Korea (Gaon Digital Chart)	9
South Korea (Gaon Album Chart)	4

== Release history ==
Region	Date	Format	Label
South Korea	August 9, 2016	Digital download	YMC Entertainment, LOEN Entertainment
South Korea	August 11, 2016	CD	YMC Entertainment, LOEN Entertainment
