= Studio Blu =

South Korean record label

- Founded: 2018
- Founder: Stone Music Entertainment
- Defunct: August 2021
- Distributor: Stone Music Entertainment
- Genre: K-pop; R&B; Indie; Hip hop
- Country of origin: South Korea

Studio Blu (Korean: 스튜디오블루) was an in-house label founded in 2018 by Stone Music Entertainment. In August 2021, the label was integrated with other CJ ENM labels as Wake One.

== History ==
Studio Blu was founded in 2018, and houses artists such as Heize, Mia, DAVII and Truedy$. ammy joined the company in 2019.

It was announced that 3 years after their disbandment, I.O.I was set to return in December 2019, potentially with all 11 original members, and will be co-managed by Swing Entertainment and Studio Blu. However, the comeback has been virtually canceled due to scheduling conflicts between the members and the ongoing Produce investigations.

== Former artists ==
- I.O.I (2019) (co-managed with Swing Entertainment)
  - Lim Na-young (2019)
  - Kim Chung-ha (2019)
  - Kim Se-jeong (2019)
  - Jung Chae-yeon (2019)
  - Zhou Jieqiong (2019)
  - Kim So-hye (2019)
  - Choi Yoo-jung (2019)
  - Kang Mi-na (2019)
  - Kim Do-yeon (2019)
- Heize (2018–2020)
- DAVII
- Mia
- Truedy
- $ammy
