= Hand in Hand (Olympic theme song) =

1988 Summer Olympics theme song

Single by Koreana

from the album Hand in Hand
- Released: 1988
- Length: 4:13
- Label: Polydor
- Composer: Giorgio Moroder
- Lyricists: Tom Whitlock (English lyrics); Kim Moon-hwan (Korean lyrics)
- Producer: Giorgio Moroder

"Hand in Hand" (Korean: 손에 손 잡고; RR: Sone son japgo) is a song by South Korean band Koreana that was the official theme song of the 1988 Summer Olympics held in Seoul, South Korea. It is sung in both Korean and English and was produced by Giorgio Moroder. Its English lyrics were written by Tom Whitlock while its Korean lyrics were penned by Kim Moon-hwan.

"Hand in Hand" topped the music charts of several European countries, including Norway, Sweden, Switzerland, and West Germany. It has since been translated and covered several times. In 2013, Moroder said that the original singer of the demo recording that he presented to PolyGram was Joe Pizzulo, not Koreana.

== Charts ==
=== Weekly charts ===
Chart (1988)	Peak position
Australia (Kent Music Report)	98
Austria (Ö3 Austria Top 40)	7
Denmark (IFPI)	3
Europe (Eurochart Hot 100)	4
Finland (Suomen virallinen lista)	21
Italy Airplay (Music & Media)	4
Norway (VG-lista)	1
Portugal (AFP)	3
Sweden (Sverigetopplistan)	1
Switzerland (Schweizer Hitparade)	1
West Germany (GfK)	1

=== Year-end charts ===
Chart (1988)	Position
Europe (Eurochart Hot 100)	4
Switzerland (Schweizer Hitparade)	3
West Germany (Media Control)	21

== Certifications ==
Region	Certification	Certified units/sales
Germany (BVMI)	Gold	250,000^{^}
Switzerland (IFPI Switzerland)	Gold	25,000^{^}
^{^} Shipments figures based on certification alone.

== Cover versions and cultural references ==
- A Mandarin version of the song, called 心手相連 (xin shou xiang lian, hearts and hands join), performed by Alan Tam.
- A Cantonese version of the song, called 一呼百應 (Yat hu bat ying, many people respond to one call), performed by Hong Kong singers Timothy Wong and Pearl Lee.
- A Finnish version, called "Käy mun vierelläin" (Eng. "Walk by my side"), with lyrics by Juha "Junnu" Vainio, was released by Tauski Peltonen and Meiju Suvas in 1989.
- A Swedish version, called "Jul i vinterland" (Eng. "Christmas in Winterland"), with lyrics by Keith Almgren, has been recorded by Wizex in 1988 on Christmas compilation albums and on single in 1991.
- On August 14, 2016, South Korean girl group I.O.I released a digital single and remake of the song.
- On March 20, 2026, the South Korean boy group BTS released the song "Body To Body" as part of their 14-track album Arirang, which was stated to have been directly inspired by the song "Hand in Hand" in interviews, most recently from Hot Ones.

== In popular culture ==
- The ending part of the song was featured in the original version of the Pingu episode "Ice Hockey", whereas the redubbed version has an original piece of instrumental music in its place.
- The song was also featured in an episode of the Chinese drama series Blossoms Shanghai.
