= Lim Na-young =

South Korean actress (born 1995)

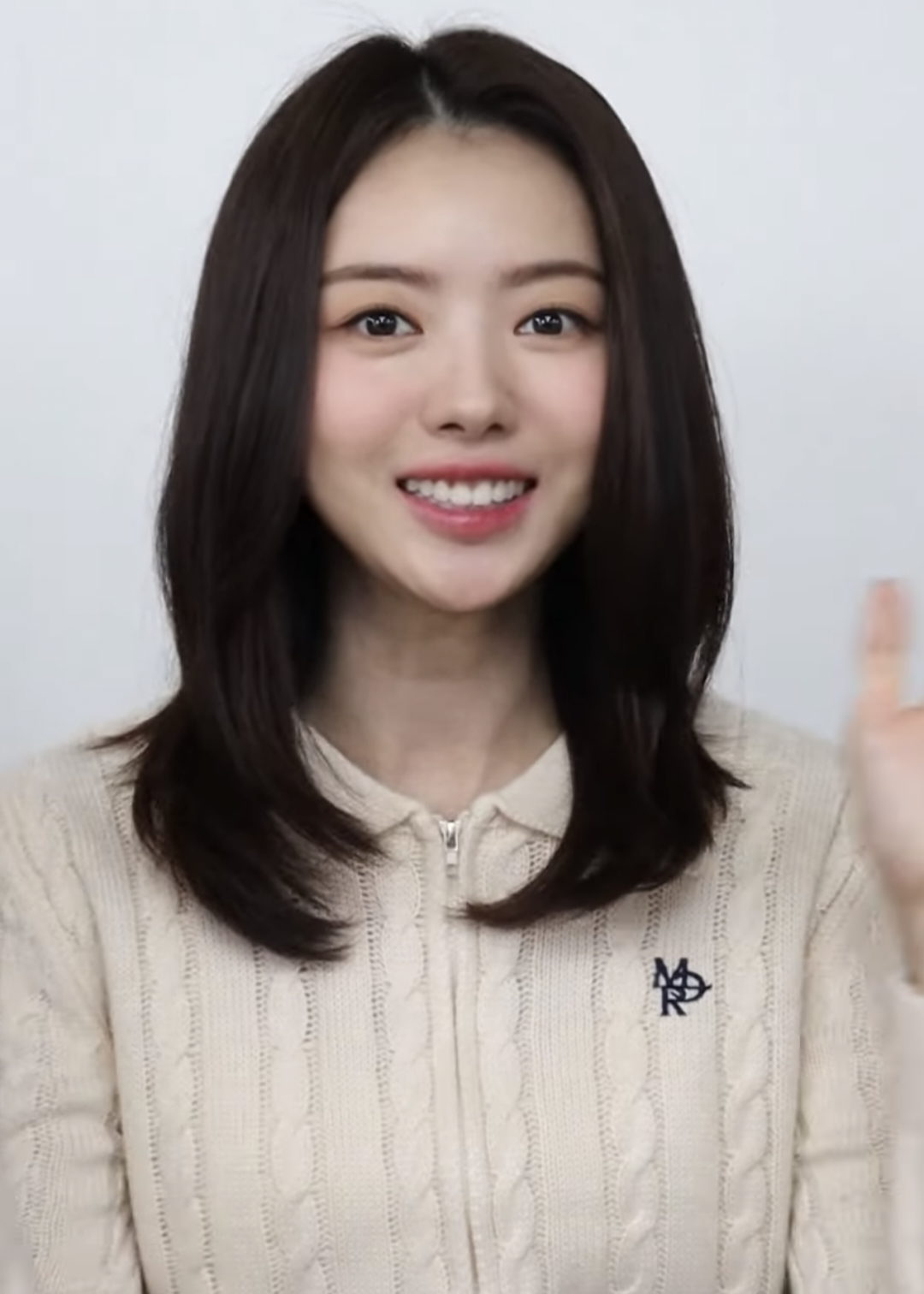
- Lim in October 2024
- Born: December 18, 1995 (age 30); South Korea
- Education: Dongduk Women's University
- Occupations: Actress; singer; rapper
- Years active: 2016–present
- Musical career
- Genre: K-pop
- Instrument: Vocals
- Years active: 2016–2021; 2026–present
- Labels: Pledis; YMC (Note: As a member of I.O.I only.); Swing; Studio Blu
- Member of: I.O.I
- Formerly of: I.O.I sub-unit; Pristin; Pristin V; Happy Pledis

Korean name
- Hangul: 임나영
- Hanja: 林娜榮
- RR: Im Nayeong
- MR: Im Nayŏng

Lim Na-young (Korean: 임나영; born December 18, 1995) is a South Korean actress, singer and rapper. She was best known for finishing tenth in Mnet's reality survival show Produce 101 and subsequently became a member and leader of the South Korean girl group I.O.I. She was also a member of Pristin from 2016 to 2019.

== Early life and education ==
Lim was born on December 18, 1995. She attended the Muhak Girls' High School and graduated from Dongduk Women's University.

== Career ==
=== 2016: Produce 101 and debut with I.O.I ===
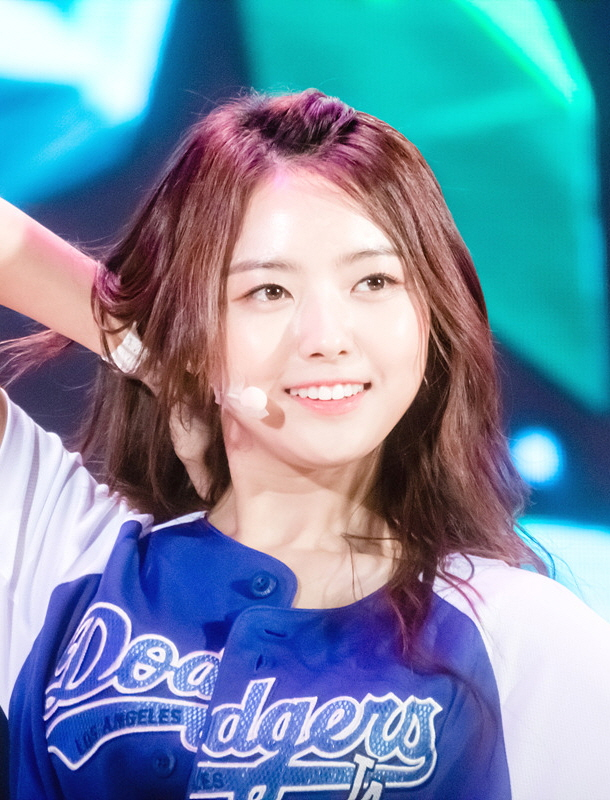
Lim performing in 2016

From January 22 to April 1, 2016, Lim participated in Mnet's survival television show, Produce 101, which consisted of 101 female trainees from different agencies in South Korea. Five participants from Pledis Entertainment were eliminated and only Lim and Kyulkyung made it to the final line up of I.O.I. She ranked tenth with a total of 138,726 votes. On May 4, I.O.I made their debut with the extended play, Chrysalis, and its lead single, "Dream Girls".

=== 2017–2019: Disbandment of I.O.I and Pristin ===
After the disbandment of I.O.I on January 29, 2017, Pledis Entertainment announced that Lim and Kyulkyung would debut as members of Pristin on March 21. On the same day, Pristin released their debut EP, Hi! Pristin, accompanied by the lead single, "Wee Woo".

On May 17, 2018, Pledis Entertainment formed Pristin's subgroup, Pristin V, with Lim being one of its members. They debuted on May 28 with the single album, Like a V.

On May 24, 2019, Pristin was officially disbanded and Pledis Entertainment announced that Lim would be departing from the label. On August 22, she signed an exclusive contract with Sublime Artist Agency. Four days later, she was appointed promotional ambassador for tourist destination Insadong.

=== 2020–present: Solo beginnings ===
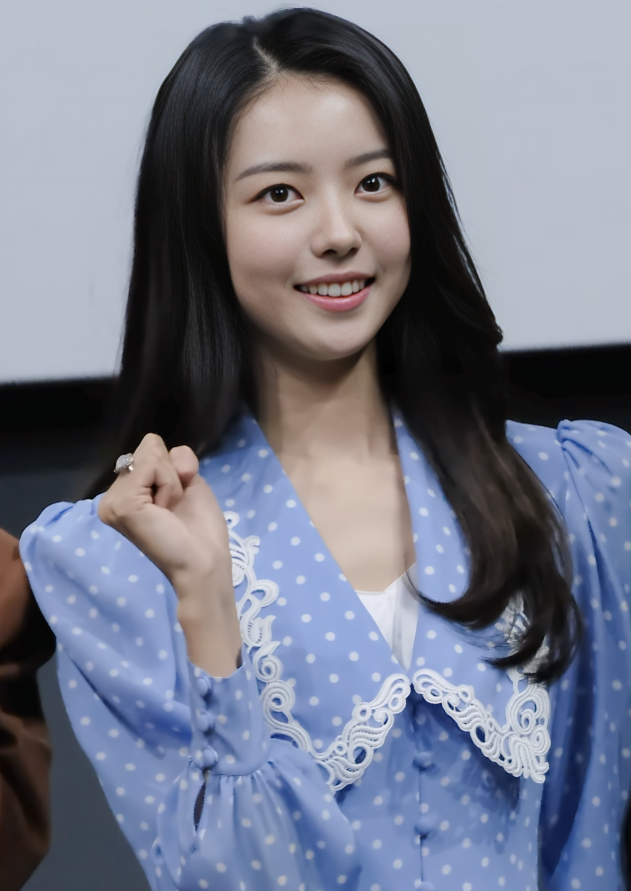
Lim in 2021

On January 28, 2021, Lim made her acting debut in the mystery drama Flower of Evil, playing the role of young Do Hae-soo. The same year, she played her first main role in the web drama Summer Guys alongside fellow former I.O.I member Kang Mi-na. On April 1, it was confirmed that Lim was selected as campaign artist for Levi's Red alongside Got7's Choi Young-jae. Lim made a soundtrack appearance on Summer Guys with "So So" (그냥 그렇다고), released on April 7. She made her film debut in Twenty Hacker and sang the soundtrack, "Not Just Friends", for the film. Lim also released two tracks as part of part 4 of Twenty Hackers soundtrack with "With All My Heart" (온맘다해) as the title track as well as "Like The Two Of Us" (우리 둘처럼) on April 15. She played a supporting role for KBS2 drama Imitation, released on May 7. She was also set to play the main role of Hyun-ah in KBS1 drama Over To You. On June 29, Lim was confirmed to make her debut in the musical I Loved You which premiered on August 14. On December 1, Lim was cast in the short-form horror film 4:44 Seconds which was released on November 1, 2024.

On July 7, 2023, it was announced that Lim had signed a contract with Ascendio. The same year, she was cast in family drama Unpredictable Family. On February 19, 2024, she signed an exclusive contract with Mask Studio following their new establishment. On September 26, she was cast in the Korean–Japanese joint musical series Nebula. On November 8, it was announced that Lim would release her first CCM single album as part of a donation for underprivileged children and the next generation.

On November 19, 2025, Lim decided to end her contract with Mask Studio to participate for the 10th anniversary of I.O.I reunion activities. On September 17, 2026, Lim returned to acting in the CJ ENM short form drama One Day, a New Employee Gained 7 Seniors?! (lit.), portraying protagonist, who thought applied for a dating reality show and meet seniors from seven affiliates.

== Discography ==
=== Singles ===
Title	Year	Album
"Hardship is beneficial" (고난은 유익이라)	2024	Non-album single

=== Soundtrack appearances ===
Title	Year	Album
"Not Just Friends"	2021	Twenty Hacker OST Part 1
"So So" (그냥 그렇다고)	2021	Summer Guys OST Part 2
"With All My Heart" (온맘다해)	2021	Twenty Hacker OST Part 4
"Like The Two Of Us" (우리둘처럼)	2021	Twenty Hacker OST Part 4

=== Songwriting credits ===
All song credits are adapted from the Korea Music Copyright Association's database, unless otherwise noted.

List of songs, showing year released, artist name, and name of the album
Title	Year	Artist	Album	Notes
"I.O.I" (intro)	2016	I.O.I	Chrysalis	As lyricist
"Dream Girls"	2016	I.O.I	Chrysalis	As lyricist
"More More"	2016	I.O.I	Miss Me?	As lyricist
"Be the Star"	2017	Pristin	Hi! Pristin	As lyricist
"You're My Boy"	2017	Pristin	Schxxl Out	As lyricist
"Not Just Friends"	2021	Herself	Twenty Hacker OST Part 4	As lyricist

== Filmography ==
=== Film ===
Year	Title	Role	Notes	Ref.
2021	Twenty Hacker	Park Joo-hee		
2022	The Distributors	Kim Da-eun	Film Television	
2024	4:44 Seconds	Kim Sun-young	Episode 6: "Share House"	

=== Television series ===
Year	Title	Role	Notes	Ref.
2016	Entourage	Herself	Episode 1 with Chungha	
2020	Flower of Evil	young Do Hae-soo		
2021	Over To You	Hyun-ah	One act-drama	
2021	Imitation	Shim Hyun-ji		
2022	KBS Drama Special – "The Distributors"	Kim Da-eun	One act-drama	
2023–2024	Unpredictable Family	Kang Seon-joo		

=== Web series ===
Year	Title	Role	Notes	Ref.
2021	Summer Guys	Yeom Ah-ran		
2021	Exciting Broadcast Accident	Yoon Yi-seo		
2022	Beauty/Woman: Rising Destiny	Han Da-bit		
2025	Nebula	Kokomi	Korean–Japanese series	
2026	One Day, a New Employee Gained 7 Seniors?! (lit.)	Protagonist	Short-form drama	

=== Television shows ===
Year	Title	Role	Notes	Ref.
2016	Produce 101	Contestant	Survival show that determined I.O.I members Finished 10th	
2018	Can Love Be Translated?	Regular cast		
2019	Beauty Time	Host		
2021	We Became a Family	Cast Member		
2024	My Way Package Season 2: Pick Me Trip in Bali	Cast Member		
2024	Beauty Live in Saigon	Cast Member		
2025	I Am the Best	Cast Member		

=== Music video appearances ===
Year	Song Title	Artist	Ref.
2014	"Game Over"	Bumzu	
2014	"Why are We?"	TROY	
2015	"Man Of The Year"	Hanhae feat. D.meanor	
2016	"If You"	Ailee	
2024	"There Goes Santa Claus! "	Chung Ha	

== Theatre ==
Year	Title		Role	Ref.
Year	English	Korean	Role	Ref.
2021	I Loved You	사랑했어요	Kim Eun-joo	
2023–2024	Hello the Hell: Othello	헬: 오델로	Desdemona	

== Ambassadorship ==
- Public Relations Ambassador of Asan Police Station (2021)
