= What a Man (song) =

1968 single by Linda Lyndell

- 2002 UK vinyl re-release

Single by Linda Lyndell
- B-side: "I Don't Know"
- Released: July 1968 (US)
- Genre: Soul
- Label: Volt (VOA-4001)
- Songwriter: Dave Crawford
- Producer: Dave Crawford

Linda Lyndell singles chronology
"Bring Your Love Back to Me" (1967)	"What a Man" (1968)

"What a Man" is a song written by Dave Crawford, and originally recorded for Stax Records' Volt imprint by American soul singer Linda Lyndell, whose recording reached number 50 on the US Billboard R&B chart in 1968. The song was sampled and reinterpreted as "Whatta Man" in 1993 by the trio Salt-N-Pepa with En Vogue, which became a commercial success; reaching the top ten in Australia, New Zealand, the United Kingdom, and the United States. It was also sampled and reinterpreted by the Korean pop girl group I.O.I in a popular variant released in 2016, again using the name "Whatta Man".

== Linda Lyndell version ==
Linda Lyndell, a white singer who had been a supporting act with James Brown and Ike & Tina Turner and then recommended to Stax Records by Otis Redding, recorded "What a Man". The song was essentially improvised by Lyndell, record producer Dave Crawford, and the Stax studio musicians in Memphis, Tennessee. It was released as a single in 1968 with the B-side track "I Don't Know"; both songs were credited to and produced by Dave Crawford. The single entered the Billboard Hot Rhythm & Blues Singles chart on August 24, 1968, and then peaked at number 50. The record came to the attention of white supremacists in the Ku Klux Klan, who threatened Lyndell for associating with black musicians; as a result, she largely withdrew from the music business for the next 25 years.

== Cover versions ==
Laura Lee covered the song, released in 1970 as a single by the Cotillion Records with "Separation Line" as the B-side track. Lee's version earned poor sales.

"What a Man" was covered by German singer Lena Meyer-Landrut as the theme song to the 2011 German film What a Man. It is featured on the Platinum edition her second studio album Good News and on the film soundtrack album. It was released on 2 September 2011 as CD single and Digital download in Germany, reaching number 21 on the German Singles Chart. A music video for the Lena version was released.

Both the American hip hop band Salt-N-Pepa and the Korean pop girl group I.O.I sampled the song in their hit songs entitled "Whatta Man", released in 1993 and 2016, respectively.

Jessica Mauboy recorded a version of "What a Man" for the soundtrack of the 2012 film The Sapphires.
