= Downpour (song) =

Song by South Korean girl group I.O.I

Single by I.O.I
- Released: January 17, 2017
- Recorded: December 2016
- Length: 4:02
- Label: YMC; Stone
- Songwriter: Woozi
- Producer: Woozi

I.O.I singles chronology
"Very Very Very" (2016)	"Downpour" (2017)	"Goodbye with a Smile" (2026)

Music video
- "Downpour (YMC)" on YouTube "Downpour (Stone)" on YouTube

"Downpour" (Korean: 소나기) is a song recorded by South Korean girl group project I.O.I released just for fans by YMC Entertainment and distributed by Stone Music Entertainment on January 17, 2017. The single is the act's final project together after rising to fame in 2016 and becoming one of Korea's most popular acts of the year.

== Music video ==
The song's accompanying music video featured documentary-style footage of the I.O.I members throughout their year together. The group was formed through the Korean television program Produce 101 in 2016, and the 11 members were picked from 101 trainees aiming to be K-pop stars. The group's name I.O.I is an acronym for "Ideal of Idol," which emphasizes the member's expertise and potential as some of the top K-pop idol trainees of 2016.

== Awards and nominations ==
=== Music programs awards ===
Song	Program	Date
"Downpour"	Inkigayo (SBS)	January 31, 2017

== Charts ==
Chart (2019)	Peak position
South Korea (Gaon)	3
South Korea (Kpop Hot 100)	39
