= Dream Girls (song) =

2016 single by I.O.I

Single by I.O.I

from the album Chrysalis
- Released: May 4, 2016
- Recorded: 2016
- Genre: K-pop
- Length: 3:38
- Label: YMC; LOEN
- Songwriters: Famous Bro; Lim Nayoung; Choi Yoojung
- Producers: Famous Bro; Paul

I.O.I singles chronology
"Crush" (2016)	"Dream Girls" (2016)	"Whatta Man" (2016)

Music video
- "Dream Girls (YMC)" on YouTube "Dream Girls (Stone)" on YouTube

"Dream Girls" is the official debut single by South Korean girl group project I.O.I for their first EP Chrysalis (2016). It was released as the title track from the EP by YMC Entertainment and distributed by LOEN Entertainment on May 4, 2016, in conjunction with the mini-album. The lyrics were written by Famous Bro and I.O.I's members Lim Nayoung and Choi Yoojung and the music was composed by Famous Bro and Paul. To promote the song and the mini-album, I.O.I performed "Dream Girls" on several South Korean music programs, including M Countdown, The Show and Music Bank. A music video for the song was also released on May 4.

The song was a commercial success peaking at number 7 on the Gaon Digital Chart. It has sold over 530,153 digital copies as of July 2016.

== Composition ==
"Dream Girls" was described as trap pop dance track co-written by famous producer Famousbro and composer Paul with rap lyrics written by Lim Na Young and Choi Yoo Jung. Lyrically, the song tells an encouraging message of going towards your dream and not giving up.

== Music video ==
The music video was released on May 3, 2016. The music video narrates a different story for each member of I.O.I in which they pursue a different dream, showing their effort to achieve it. The choreography for the song was created by Bae Yoon Jung, one of the mentors of Produce 101.

== Commercial performance ==
"Dream Girls" entered at number at 9 on the Gaon Digital Chart on the chart issue dated May 1–7, 2016 with 142,106 downloads sold and 1,741,763 streams. In its second week, the song peaked at number 7 on the chart issue dated May 8–14, 2016 with 81,376 downloads sold and 2,453,059 streams.

The song entered and peaked at number 7 on the Gaon Digital Chart for the month of May 2016. For the month of June the song placed at number 44 and for the month of July at number 94, charting for three consecutive months.

== Charts ==
=== Weekly charts ===
Chart (2016)	Peak position
South Korea (Gaon Digital Chart)	7

=== Monthly charts ===
Chart (2016)	Peak position
South Korea (Gaon Digital Chart)	7
