= Crush (I.O.I song) =

Music single by South Korean girl group I.O.I

Single by I.O.I

from the album Chrysalis
- Released: April 5, 2016
- Recorded: 2016
- Genre: K-pop; dance-pop; electropop
- Length: 3:32
- Label: CJ E&M
- Songwriters: Seo Ji-eum; Seo Jung-ah; Nermin Harmabasic; August Rigo; Justin Davey; Ryan S. Jhun; iDR; Melanie Fontana; Michel Schulz; Courtney Jenaé Stahl
- Producers: Michel Schulz; August Rigo; Justin Davey; Nermin Harmabasic; Ryan S. Jhun; Melanie Fontana; iDR; Courtney Jenaé Stahl

I.O.I singles chronology
"Pick Me" (2015)	"Crush" (2016)	"Dream Girls" (2016)

Music video
- "Crush" on YouTube

"Crush" is the pre-debut single by South Korean girl group I.O.I. It was released online as a digital single on April 5, 2016 through CJ E&M.

== Background ==
CJ E&M formed I.O.I through the reality competition series Produce 101 on Mnet. The song "Crush" was announced to be the debut song for the winners of the series. However, shortly before the end of the series, YMC Entertainment and Mnet decided to postpone the debut of I.O.I until May to give the group more time to prepare. They decided that "Crush" would be released as a pre-debut single by I.O.I after the conclusion of Produce 101.

In the final episode, which was broadcast live on April 1, 2016, the remaining 22 contestants performed the song as their final assessment, after which viewers voted for their favorite contestant. After the voting period, the top 11 contestants were announced and became the members of the new group I.O.I. The members of I.O.I then recorded "Crush", which was released as a pre-debut single on April 5. The music video for the song was released the same day.

== Commercial performance ==
"Crush" entered and peaked at number 12 on South Korea's Gaon Digital Chart, on the week ending April 9. On the following week ending April 16, the song fell eighteen places, charting at number 30. In its third and fourth consecutive week in the chart, the song stayed at number 39. In its seventh week, ending May 21, the song charted at number 81, the lowest since the debut.

== Track listing ==
No.	Title	Lyrics	Music	Length
1.	"Crush"	Seo Ji-eum, Seo Jung-ah	August Rigo, Justin Davey, Nermin Harmabasic, Ryan S. Jhun, iDR, Melanie Fontana, Michel Schulz, Courtney Jenaé Stahl	3:35
Total length:				3:35

== Charts ==
Chart	Peak position
South Korea (Gaon Digital Chart)	12

== Sales ==
Region	Sales
South Korea (Gaon)	323,707+
