= I.O.I: Loop =

EP by I.O.I
- Released: May 19, 2026
- Length: 20:28
- Languages: Korean; English
- Labels: Swing; Stone; KT Genie
- Producers: Dominsuk; VVN; Ido; Big Sancho; Tommy Rush; Hey Farmer; MinGtion; Jung Jinyoung; Kim Yongshin

I.O.I chronology
Miss Me? (2016)	I.O.I: Loop (2026)

Singles from I.O.I: Loop
- 1. "Goodbye with a Smile" Released: May 4, 2026; 2. "Suddenly" Released: May 19, 2026

Professional ratings
Review scores
Source	Rating
IZM	2/5 stars

I.O.I: Loop (Korean: 아이오아이 : 루프; stylized in all caps) is the third extended play (EP) by South Korean girl group I.O.I. Produced by Swing Entertainment and distributed by Stone Music Entertainment and KT Genie Music, the EP was released on May 19, 2026. The EP marked the group's reunion to celebrate their tenth debut anniversary.

Formed as a temporary project group from the television program Produce 101 (2016), I.O.I found success but only actively promoted for less than a year before disbanding in January 2017 as part of their contract. While the members pursued solo or group careers in their respective agencies, attempted reunions never materialized until it was announced in December 2025 that nine of the eleven members would reunite to release new music for their tenth anniversary.

The EP features a total of six tracks, carried by its singles "Goodbye with a Smile" and "Suddenly". The physical version of I.O.I: Loop features one version, including a photo book, a CD, two random photo cards, a poster, a special printed photo, a mini accordion booklet and a photo taken with a Polaroid camera. I.O.I promoted the EP through their Loop Tour around Asia.

== Background ==
On July 1, 2019, Studio Blu confirmed that the group would return in October 2019 with nine members, excluding Yoo Yeon-jung and Jeon So-mi. On September 6, the planned comeback was postponed to December. On October 29, the comeback was canceled due to scheduling conflicts between the members and the Mnet vote manipulation investigation.

On December 25, 2025, the members revealed that I.O.I would reunite for a comeback in May 2026; with the exception of Zhou Jieqiong and Kang Mi-na—who were unable to participate due to commitments to acting—the remaining nine members joined forces for this reunion project. On February 23, 2026, Swing Entertainment announced that the group will reunite for a new album release in May, without Mina and Jieqiong. Swing also confirmed that they will manage the group's promotional activities for the album and their 10th anniversary. On March 9, 2026, I.O.I launched official social media accounts to mark their 10th anniversary.

== Release and promotion ==
On April 20, the group announced that their album would be titled I.O.I: Loop and scheduled its release for May 19. The following day, the album's promotional schedule was unveiled. On April 22, a concept film was released. On April 23, the first set of concept photos was revealed. Four days later, the EP's tracklist was released. On April 28, the second set of concept photos was unveiled. On May 4, the pre-release single "Goodbye With A Smile" was released. The single, recorded in 2016 and produced by Jung Jinyoung, features Mina and Jieqiong who were unable to join the comeback activities. The following day, the first music video teaser for the title track, "Suddenly" (Korean: 갑자기), was released.

== Track listing ==
I.O.I: Loop track listing
No.	Title	Lyrics	Music	Length
1.	"IOI (Where My Girls At)"	Jeon Somi	Jeon Somi; Dominsuk	3:02
2.	"Suddenly" (갑자기)	Jeon Somi; VVN	VVN; Kush; Ido	3:15
3.	"SPF 100+ (Summer Pop Fantasy)"	Emily Yeonseo Kim; Jung-yoon	Big Sancho; Thomas Mikailin; Emily Yeonseo Kim; Rachel Kanner; K-Mega	3:34
4.	"If I"	Shannon Bae; Yoo Yeon-jung; Hey Farmer	Hey Farmer; Shannon Bae; Yoo Yeon-jung	2:47
5.	"Then, Now, and Forever" (그때 우리 지금)	Chung Ha	MinGtion; Chung Ha	3:50
6.	"Goodbye with a Smile" (웃으며 안녕; recorded in 2016; prod. Jinyoung)	Jinyoung	Jinyoung	4:00
Total length:				20:28

== Charts ==
Chart performance for I.O.I: Loop
Chart (2026)	Peak position
Japanese Download Albums (Billboard Japan)	70
South Korean Albums (Circle)	33

== Release history ==
Release history for I.O.I: Loop
Region	Date	Format	Label
South Korea	May 19, 2026	CD	Swing; Stone; KT Genie
Various	May 19, 2026	Digital download; streaming	Swing; Stone; KT Genie
