= Miss Me? =

Extended play by South Korean girl group I.O.I

EP by I.O.I
- Released: October 17, 2016
- Recorded: September – October 2016
- Genres: K-pop; pop; dance; ballad
- Length: 16:52
- Language: Korean
- Labels: YMC; LOEN
- Producers: J. Y. Park "The Asiansoul"; Jinyoung; Rhymer

I.O.I chronology
| Chrysalis (2016) | Miss Me? (2016) | I.O.I: Loop (2026) |

Singles from Miss Me?
- 1. "Very Very Very" Released: October 17, 2016

Music video
- "Very Very Very" on YouTube

Miss Me? is the second extended play (EP) by South Korean girl group I.O.I, a project group created through the 2016 Mnet survival show, Produce 101, composed of eleven trainees from different entertainment companies that promoted until January 2017 under YMC Entertainment. It contains five tracks, including the lead single, "Very Very Very" produced by Park Jin-young.

The EP was a commercial success peaking at number 2 on the Gaon Album Chart. The album sold 93,593 physical copies in 2016.

== Background and release ==
After I.O.I's promotion as a unit group, YMC Entertainment announced the comeback of the whole group with eleven members slated for an October release. It was also revealed that the new album would be the last activity before their disbandment.

In September 2016, it was announced that the October release would be an extended play, with a title track composed by Park Jin-young, founder of Jeon So-mi's agency JYP Entertainment and b-side tracks produced by Brand New Music's Rhymer and Jinyoung of B1A4, who also produced I.O.I's song "When the Cherry Blossoms Fade". The photo shoot for the album took place in a studio in Seoul on September 27. The next day, it was confirmed that the new EP is scheduled for release on October 17 at midnight. I.O.I filmed the title track's music video in Gyeonggi Province on October 3 and 4.

The group's special comeback show titled I Miss You Very Very Very Much Show (Hangul: 너무너무너무 보고싶었SHOW) was aired live through Mnet on October 16 at 23:30 KST, followed by the release of Miss Me? and the title track's music video at midnight.

== Promotion ==
I.O.I held the showcase for Miss Me? on October 17, 2016, at Yes24 Live Hall located in Seoul. The group then made their music program comeback on The Show: Busan One Asia Festival on the next day, performing "Hold On" and "Very Very Very". It was followed by comeback stages on the October 19th episode of Show Champion, M! Countdown on the 20th and Music Bank on the 21st.

The group received their first music program trophy as a whole group with "Very Very Very" on the October 26th episode of Show Champion.

== Commercial performance ==
Miss Me? entered and peaked at number 2 on the Gaon Album Chart dated October 16–22, 2016 for the physical sales of the EP. In its second week, it fell to number 4, staying in the Top 10 of the chart. It also entered at number 7 on the Gaon Album Chart for the month of October 2016 with 75,047 physical copies sold. The following month, the EP charted at number 19 with 15,551 physical copies sold for a total of 90,598 physical copies sold since the release.

The EP charted at number 28 on the Gaon Album Chart for the year-end 2016 with 93,593 physical copies sold.

All the songs from the EP also charted on the Gaon Digital Chart: "Very Very Very" at number 1, "Hold On" at number 10, "More More" at number 61, "Ping Pong" at number 77 and "M-Maybe" at number 86.

== Track listing ==
| No. | Title | Lyrics | Music | Arrangement | Length |
|---|---|---|---|---|---|
| 1. | "Very Very Very" (너무너무너무; Neomu Neomu Neomu) | J. Y. Park "The Asiansoul" | J. Y. Park "The Asiansoul" | J. Y. Park "The Asiansoul"; Kim Seung-soom; Armadillo | 3:23 |
| 2. | "Hold On" (잠깐만; Jamkkanman) | Jinyoung | Jinyoung | Jinyoung; Kang Myung-shin | 3:04 |
| 3. | "More More" (내 말대로 해줘; Nae Maldaero Haejwo) | Rhymer; Lim Na-young; Choi Yoo-jung | Assbrass; Kiggen | Assbrass | 3:44 |
| 4. | "Ping Pong" | ESBEE; 9999; Last.P | 9999; ESBEE | 9999; ESBEE | 3:29 |
| 5. | "M-Maybe" (음 어쩌면; Eum Eojjeomyeon) | Jung Chang-wook; BOYTOY | Jung Chang-wook; BOYTOY | Jung Chang-wook; BOYTOY | 3:12 |
| Total length: | | | | | 16:52 |

== Awards and nominations ==
=== Music program awards ===
| Song | Program | Date |
|---|---|---|
| "Very Very Very" | Show Champion (MBC Music) | October 26, 2016 |
| "Very Very Very" | M Countdown (Mnet) | October 27, 2016 |
| "Very Very Very" | Inkigayo (SBS) | October 30, 2016 |

== Charts ==
=== Weekly charts ===
| Chart (2016) | Peak position |
|---|---|
| South Korea (Gaon Album Chart) | 2 |

=== Monthly charts ===
| Chart (2016) | Peak position |
|---|---|
| South Korea (Gaon Album Chart) | 7 |

=== Yearly-end charts ===
| Chart (2016) | Peak position |
|---|---|
| South Korea (Gaon Album Chart) | 28 |

== Release history ==
| Region | Date | Format | Distributor |
|---|---|---|---|
| South Korea, Worldwide | October 17, 2016 | digital download | YMC Entertainment, LOEN Entertainment |
| South Korea | October 17, 2016 | CD | YMC Entertainment, LOEN Entertainment |
