= The Sapphires (soundtrack) =

The Sapphires: Original Motion Picture Soundtrack

Soundtrack album by Various Artists
- Released: 27 July 2012
- Genres: Pop; soul; R&B
- Length: 45:50
- Languages: English; Yorta Yorta
- Label: Sony
- Producer: Bry Jones

Jessica Mauboy albums chronology
Get 'Em Girls (2010)	The Sapphires: Original Motion Picture Soundtrack (2012)	Beautiful (2013)

Singles from The Sapphires: Original Motion Picture Soundtrack
- 1. "Gotcha" Released: 13 July 2012

The Sapphires: Original Motion Picture Soundtrack is a soundtrack album for the film The Sapphires (2012), released on 27 July 2012 by Sony Music Australia. It features the vocals of Jessica Mauboy, Jade MacRae, Lou Bennett, Juanita Tippens and Darren Percival, with Mauboy singing in ten of the sixteen songs. Produced by Bry Jones, the soundtrack contains songs from the 1960s, including "Land of a Thousand Dances", "I Can't Help Myself (Sugar Pie Honey Bunch)", "I Heard It Through the Grapevine" and "What a Man". The track "Ngarra Burra Ferra" is a song based on the traditional Aboriginal hymn "Bura Fera" in the Yorta Yorta language of Victoria, Australia, the language spoken by the indigenous Yorta Yorta people of the Goulburn Valley and Murray River valley centred on modern-day Echuca.

"Gotcha", an original song co-written by Mauboy, Ilan Kidron and Louis Schoorl, was released as a single and peaked at number 43 on the ARIA Singles Chart. The album was well received by critics, who praised the vocals and songs chosen to appear on the soundtrack. The Sapphires – Original Motion Picture Soundtrack peaked at number one on the ARIA Album Chart and was certified double platinum by the Australian Recording Industry Association (ARIA). It also reached number 15 on the New Zealand Albums Chart. A deluxe edition, featuring an additional five songs, was released on 16 November 2012.

== Reception ==
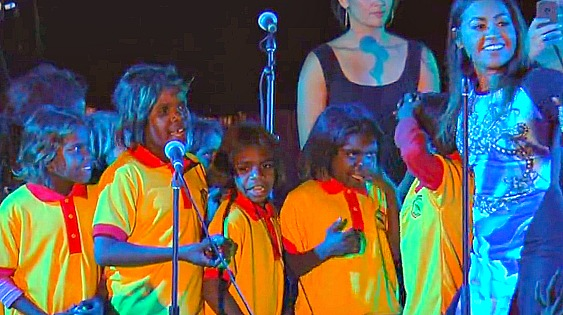
Mauboy performing "Ngarra Burra Ferra" at the 2013 Mbantua Festival in Alice Springs, Northern Territory with Aboriginal Australian students from Yipirinya State Primary School, of which Mauboy is the official ambassador.

=== Critical response ===
Professional ratings
Review scores
Source	Rating
News.com.au	3.5/5 stars
The Age	4/5 stars
The Music	Positive

The soundtrack received mostly positive reviews from critics, who praised Mauboy's vocals. Cameron Adams of News.com.au was pleased to hear Mauboy sing "old-school soul and R&B", and the songs "Land of a Thousand Dances", "I Can't Help Myself (Sugar Pie Honey Bunch)" and "I Heard It Through the Grapevine" showcased her "pure voice". Warwick McFadyen of The Age called the soundtrack a "gem" and noted that "Land of a Thousand Dances", "I Can't Help Myself (Sugar Pie Honey Bunch)", "I Heard It Through the Grapevine" and "What a Man", "set the standard, both in selection and execution, for the soundtrack". He also praised Mauboy's singing, and commented that the vocals of Jade MacRae, Lou Bennett and Juanita Tippens on some of the tracks added "more vocal lustre". Lynne McDonnell of TheMusic.com.au described the Yorta Yorta language song "Ngarra Burra Ferra" as "one of the many musical pillars in the album that draw you in". She ended her review saying: "If there's anything keeping this soundtrack from dominating other chart releases it is the sheer length, but the balance of modern and old makes for a great listen and a more than decent driving album." The Sapphires – Original Motion Picture Soundtrack was nominated for Best Original Soundtrack, Cast or Show Album at the ARIA Music Awards of 2012.

=== Chart performance ===
In Australia, The Sapphires – Original Motion Picture Soundtrack debuted at number 17 on the ARIA Albums Chart. Two weeks later it reached number one, where it remained for two consecutive weeks, and became the first Australian soundtrack since Moulin Rouge! (2001) to top the chart. It is the forty-first soundtrack in Australian record chart history to peak at number one. Additionally, the album is the 651st (since music data collection began in Australia in 1965), and the 510th (when the Australian Recording Industry Association (ARIA) took over data collection in 1983) to peak at number one in Australia. The Sapphires – Original Motion Picture Soundtrack was certified double platinum by the Australian Recording Industry Association (ARIA), denoting 140,000 copies shipped in Australia. On 15 October 2012, the album debuted at number 21 on the New Zealand Albums Chart, and peaked at number 15 on 29 October 2012.

== Singles ==
An original song, "Gotcha", was released as the soundtrack's lead single on 13 July 2012. Co-written by Mauboy, Ilan Kidron and Louis Schoorl, it was praised for "deftly manag[ing] to be modern and retro all at once", and peaked at number 43 on the ARIA Singles Chart.

== Track listing ==
No.	Title	Performer(s)	Length
1.	"Land of a Thousand Dances"	Jessica Mauboy	2:40
2.	"I Heard It Through the Grapevine"	Jessica Mauboy	3:30
3.	"What a Man"	Jessica Mauboy	3:03
4.	"I Can't Help Myself (Sugar Pie Honey Bunch)"	Jessica Mauboy	2:44
5.	"Who's Lovin' You"	Jessica Mauboy	4:05
6.	"I'll Take You There"	Jessica Mauboy	2:45
7.	"Gotcha"	Jessica Mauboy	3:08
8.	"Soul Man"	Sam & Dave	2:38
9.	"Hold On, I'm A Comin'"	Sam & Dave	2:31
10.	"Run Through the Jungle"	Creedence Clearwater Revival	3:06
11.	"Today I Started Loving You Again"	Jessica Mauboy; Juanita Tippens; Jade MacRae	3:02
12.	"People Make the World a Better Place"	Juanita Tippens	3:13
13.	"Yellow Bird"	Jessica Mauboy and Lou Bennett	2:11
14.	"Ngarra Burra Ferra"	Jessica Mauboy; Lou Bennett; Juanita Tippens; Jade MacRae	1:31
15.	"Shouting Out Love"	The Emotions	3:12
16.	"In the Sweet Bye and Bye"	Darren Percival	2:31

Deluxe Edition bonus tracks
No.	Title	Performer(s)	Length
17.	"Tracks of My Tears"	Jessica Mauboy
18.	"Just My Imagination (Running Away with Me)"	Jessica Mauboy
19.	"Where Did Our Love Go"	Jessica Mauboy
20.	"Misty Blue"	Jessica Mauboy
21.	"Get Used to Me"	Jessica Mauboy

Notes

- The deluxe edition bonus track "Get Used to Me" is an original song written by Diane Warren.

== Charts ==
=== Weekly charts ===
Chart (2012)	Peak position
Australian Albums (ARIA)	1
New Zealand Albums (RMNZ)	15

=== Year-end charts ===
Chart (2012)	Position
Australian Albums (ARIA)	15
Australian Artist Albums (ARIA)	4

Chart (2013)	Position
Australian Albums (ARIA)	71

=== Decade-end charts ===
Chart (2010–2019)	Position
Australian Albums (ARIA)	83
Australian Artist Albums (ARIA)	15

== Certifications ==
Region	Certification	Certified units/sales
Australia (ARIA)	2× Platinum	140,000^{^}
^{^} Shipments figures based on certification alone.

== Release history ==
Region	Date	Version	Format	Label
Australia	27 July 2012	Standard edition	CD, digital download	Sony Music Australia
Australia	16 November 2012	Deluxe edition	CD, digital download	Sony Music Australia
