= Chrysalis (EP) =

2016 extended play by girl group I.O.I

- From left to right: Doyeon, Chaeyeon, Sohye, Yoojung, Sejeong, Chungha, Somi, Mina, Kyulkyung, Yeonjung, and Nayoung.

EP by I.O.I
- Released: May 4, 2016
- Recorded: April 2016
- Genre: K-pop; trap; dance-pop; ballad
- Length: 22:18
- Language: Korean
- Label: YMC; LOEN
- Producer: Famousbro; Paul; Duble Sidekick; earattack; SEION

I.O.I chronology
Chrysalis (2016)	Miss Me? (2016)

Singles from Chrysalis
- 1. "Crush" Released: April 5, 2016; 2. "Dream Girls" Released: May 4, 2016

Music video
- "Crush" on YouTube "Dream Girls" on YouTube

Chrysalis is the debut extended play by the South Korean girl group I.O.I, a special group created through the 2016 Mnet survival show Produce 101, composed of eleven trainees from different entertainment companies that will promote for a year under YMC Entertainment. The album was released digitally on May 4, 2016, and physically on May 9 with the single "Dream Girls" in two versions, a standard edition and a special edition.

The mini-album was a commercial success peaking at number 4 on the Gaon Album Chart. The EP sold 74,554 physical copies in 2016.

== Background ==
In November 2015, Mnet announced a new survival show where 101 girl group trainees will compete to be in the Top 11 that would eventually form the group I.O.I. Produce 101 ended on April 1, 2016 and the group immediately started preparations for their debut, starting with recording their own version of the song "Crush", a song produced by Ryan S. Jhun and was performed by the Top 22 of Produce 101 on the show's finale, initially intended to be the group's debut song before YMC Entertainment postponed their debut and announced that they will be recording a different song as the title track of their debut album.

On April 11, YMC Entertainment announced that the group will release the album on May 4 and will hold a debut showcase and a fan meeting on the following day at Jangchung Gymnasium. On April 27, the mini-album title was revealed to be Chrysalis. The group's 2-episode reality show Standby I.O.I showed the group's preparations for the album, from recording their songs including the title track "Dream Girls", to practicing the choreography for the songs and filming the music video. During the group's debut media showcase held on May 5, it was revealed that member Kim Se-jeong came up with the album title.

== Promotion ==
On May 5, the group held their first media showcase where the girls discussed their album and performed their new songs for the first time including the title track "Dream Girls". They also performed songs from Produce 101 such as "24 Hours" and "Yum-Yum". The group also performed their own version of "Pick Me", "Crush", and "When the Cherry Blossoms Fade", all of which are included in their new album. On the same day, they made their official debut on M! Countdown, performing both "Knock Knock Knock" and "Dream Girls". On May 10, they appeared on The Show performing both "When the Cherry Blossoms Fade" and "Dream Girls". Due to conflict of interest, the group did not perform on the music shows of the three major Korean networks KBS, MBC, and SBS. On May 20, the group made their first appearance on a non-cable television music show Music Bank. Its producer, Won Seung Yeon, stated that the group "is always a hot topic and does well in whatever they do" and that "there was no real reason to exclude them". Previously, the girls had also been excluded from being nominated on the three channels' music shows.

== Composition ==
The title track "Dream Girls" is a trap pop dance track produced by Famousbro and Paul, who also composed the album intro "I.O.I". "Dream Girls" was penned by Famousbro with rap parts written by members Lim Na-young and Choi Yoo-jung, both members also wrote the lyrics of "I.O.I". The song was chosen by the members themselves through a blind voting, where the members picked their album's title track by listening to over 30 songs from famous producers. YMC Entertainment affiliates stated that the members chose their title track and other tracks included in the album without knowing the producers and were told to pick songs that 'match the team'.

"똑똑똑 (Knock Knock Knock)" is an R&B/Pop track co-composed by Duble Sidekick, SEION, and David Kim, with lyrics by Duble Sidekick, David Kim, and Long Candy. "Doo-Wap" was produced and penned by earattack. "Crush" is a trapical Dutch funk track produced by Ryan S. Jhun and was pre-released on April 5, 2016, along with its music video. The song was featured in the finale of Produce 101, intended to be the group's debut single. "벚꽃이 지면 (When The Cherry Blossoms Fade)", produced by Jung Jin-young, is another song that was featured in the finale. I.O.I recorded their versions of both songs along with their version of "Pick Me" which is the final track in the album.

== Commercial performance ==
Chrysalis debuted at number 4 on the Gaon Album Chart while the title track "Dream Girls" debuted at number eight on the Gaon Digital Chart and rose to number 7 a week later. All the other tracks from the album also charted.

"Dream Girls" became the 7th most viewed K-Pop video in America and 4th worldwide in May.

The EP placed at number 38 on the Gaon Album Chart for the year-end 2016 with 74,554 physical copies sold.

== Track listing ==
Digital download
No.	Title	Lyrics	Music	Arrangement	Length
1.	"I.O.I" (Intro)	Lim Na-young; Choi Yoo-jung	Famousbro (Note: Eru (birth name Cho Sung-hyun) is the brother of YMC Entertainment founder and chief executive officer Cho Yoo-myung, their father being trot singer Tae Jin-ah (birth name Cho Bang-hoon). Since 2015, he uses the pen name Famousbro for composing songs for other artists.); Paul; Shin Hyun-jin; Hong Hye-jin	Famousbro; Paul	0:44
2.	"Dream Girls"	Famousbro; Lim Na-young; Choi Yoo-jung	Famousbro; Paul	Famousbro; Paul	3:38
3.	"Knock Knock Knock" (똑똑똑; Ttok Ttok Ttok)	Park Jang-geun (Duble Sidekick); David Kim; Long Candy	Park Jang-geun (Duble Sidekick); SEION; David Kim	SEION	3:50
4.	"Doo-Wap"	earattack	earattack	earattack; OBros; NeverEnd	3:21
5.	"Crush (Note: Re-recorded under license from CJ E&M)"	Seo Ji-eum; Seo Jung-ah	Nermin Harambasic; August Rigo; Justin Davey; Ryan S. Jhun; Denzil "DR" Remedios; Melanie Fontana; Michel Schulz; Courtney Jenaé Stahl	Justin Davey; Michel Schulz; Space One (Note: Space One is the pen name of Kim Jang-hyun, former member of Sunny Hill.); Ryan S. Jhun	3:32
6.	"When the Cherry Blossoms Fade" (벚꽃이 지면; Beotkkochi Jimyeon)	Jung Jin-young	Jung Jin-young	ZigZag Note; Kang Young-shin	3:23
7.	"Pick Me"	Midas-T	Midas-T	DJ KOO; Maximite	3:46
Total length:					22:18

== Charts ==
=== Weekly charts ===
Chart (2016)	Peak position
South Korea (Gaon Album Chart)	4

=== Monthly charts ===
Chart (May 2016)	Peak position
South Korean Albums (Gaon)	4

== Release history ==
Region	Date	Format	Distributor
South Korea, Worldwide	May 4, 2016	digital download	YMC Entertainment, LOEN Entertainment
South Korea	May 9, 2016	CD	YMC Entertainment, LOEN Entertainment
