= Very Very Very =

Song by South Korean girl group I.O.I

Single by I.O.I

from the album Miss Me?
- Released: October 17, 2016
- Recorded: September–October 2016
- Genre: Electropop; bubblegum pop; drum and bass
- Length: 3:23
- Label: YMC; LOEN
- Songwriter: Park Jin-young
- Producer: Park Jin-young

I.O.I singles chronology
"Whatta Man" (2016)	"Very Very Very" (2016)	"Downpour" (2017)

Music video
- "Very Very Very" on YouTube

"Very Very Very" (Korean: 너무너무너무; RR: Neomuneomuneomu) is a song recorded by South Korean girl group project I.O.I for their second mini-album Miss Me? (2016). It was released as the title track from the mini-album by YMC Entertainment and distributed by LOEN Entertainment on October 17, 2016. The lyrics were written by Park Jin-young, who also composed the music. In order to promote the song and mini-album, the group performed on several South Korean music programs, including M Countdown and Music Bank. A music video for the title track was also released on October 17.

The song was a commercial success topping the Gaon Digital Chart. It has sold over 423,491 downloads as of October 2016. The music video was the third most-viewed video on YouTube in America and Worldwide for the month of October 2016 according to Billboard.

== Background and release ==
On September 22, 2016 it was reported that Park Jin-young will be producing the title track of the upcoming release from the group and was also reported that all 11 members will be part of. Later, on October 13, a music video teaser was released revealing the name of the song as "Very Very Very".

The song was released in conjunction with the mini-album on October 17 through several music portals, including iTunes for the global market.

== Promotion ==
The group performed "Very Very Very" for the first time on Mnet's I.O.I x JYP and also on the showcase held for the release of the mini-album, Miss Me?.

I.O.I had their first comeback stage on SBS MTV's The Show, where they performed "Hold Up" and "Very Very Very" on October 18. It was followed by MBC Music's Show Champion on October 19, Mnet's M Countdown on October 20 and KBS's Music Bank on October 21.

On October 26, 2016 the group won their first music show trophy as a full group on MBC Music's Show Champion and on October 27 their second trophy on Mnet's M Countdown.

The music video for "Very Very Very" was the third most-viewed music video on YouTube in America and Worldwide for the month of October 2016 according to Billboard.

== Commercial performance ==
"Very Very Very" topped the Gaon Digital Chart on the chart issue dated October 16–22, 2016 with 266,203 downloads sold and 5,859,795 streams. This marks the first number one single by the group. In its second week, the song charted at number 2 on the chart issue dated October 23–29, 2016 with 129,179 downloads sold and 5,721,836 streams. In its third week, the song fell to number 6 staying in the Top 10 for three consecutive weeks with 82,608 downloads sold and 4,957,083 streams.

The song entered at number at number 5 on the Gaon Digital Chart for the month of October 2016 with 423,491 downloads sold and 13,046,034 streams.

== Awards and nominations ==
=== Music programs awards ===
Song	Program	Date
"Very Very Very"	Show Champion (MBC Music)	October 26, 2016
"Very Very Very"	M Countdown (Mnet)	October 27, 2016
"Very Very Very"	Inkigayo (SBS)	October 30, 2016

== Charts ==
=== Weekly charts ===
Chart (2016)	Peak position
South Korea (Gaon Digital Chart)	1

=== Monthly charts ===
Chart (2016)	Peak position
South Korea (Gaon Digital Chart)	5
