= Koreana (band) =

South Korean band

- Also known as: Arirang Singers (former)
- Origin: Seoul, South Korea
- Genres: Pop; pop rock; electronic; europop
- Years active: 1962-1995
- Labels: Polydor Records; Jigu Record
- Members: Hong Hwa-ja; Lee Seung-kyu; Lee Yong-kyu; Lee Ae-sook

Koreana, formerly known as Arirang Singers, were a South Korean band. They were formed in 1962 and started being popular internationally after they released their debut album DisCorea on Polydor label in 1979. The single "Dark Eyes" from the eponymous album was a big hit (cover of famous russian song). After the great success, they continued to release more albums: Burning Fantasy (1980) and Highlights (Too Much Love) (1983). They are best known for playing "Hand In Hand", the official song of the Seoul 1988 Summer Olympics, sung in both Korean and English. The song was released as a single with "Victory" as its B-side, and became a hit. The band followed up with another charting single, "Living For Love", with B-side "One In A Million".

Long-time group member Jerry Lee Yong-Gyu died in early 2021 of cancer.

== Members ==
=== Classic Lineup ===
- Cathy Lee Oea-Sook - vocals, keyboard, piano, electronic drums, tambourine, guitar
- Marie Hong Hwa-Ja - vocals, bass guitar, keyboard, keytar, electronic drums
- Tom Lee Seung-Kyu - vocals, guitar, saxophone, flute, trumpet, trombone
- Jerry Lee Yong-Gyu - vocals, electronic drums, percussion, trumpet (deceased 2021)

=== Past Members ===
- Sam Hong Sin-Yun
- Michel Hong Yun-Shik
- Annie Hong Young-Hee

== Discography ==
=== Albums ===
- 1979: DisCorea
- 1980: Burning Fantasy
- 1983: Highlights (Too Much Love)
- 1988: Hand In Hand
- 1990: Living For Love
- 1993: Expo '93
- 1996: We Are One

=== Singles ===
- 1978: "I Love Rock'n Roll Music" b/w "Song Of Arirang"
- 1979: "Dark Eyes" b/w "Troubles"
- 1986: "Hey Daydreamer/Don't Make Me Cry" b/w "Midnight Lover" (12" Maxi)
- 1988: "Hand In Hand"
- 1988: "Loving You, Loving Me"
- 1990: "Living For Love"
- 1992: "Sail Into The Sunset"
