= Linda Lyndell =

American singer (born 1946)

Linda Lyndell (born as Linda Rowland, November 22, 1946) is an American soul singer from Gainesville, Florida.

Lyndell sang in gospel churches as a child; though she was white, she sang in both white and black churches, and eventually began singing with R&B groups as a teenager. In the 1960s she sang as a support act with James Brown and Ike & Tina Turner, and in 1967 Atlanta disc jockey Dave Crawford introduced her to Stax Records producers Isaac Hayes and David Porter. They recorded her first single, "Bring Your Love Back to Me", in December 1967 and released it on Volt Records, but the song did not become a hit. In 1968 she did a second session, cutting the tune "What a Man"; this song reached No. 50 on the Billboard R&B charts. In response to the release of her single, she received threats from white supremacist groups such as the Ku Klux Klan, and retired from performance soon after. She remained out of music and lived in Gainesville for the next 25 years. Linda recorded songs at Fuller Studios in Tampa, Florida, in the sixties with Gene Middleton and the Sole Survivors.

In 1993, rap group Salt-n-Pepa sampled "What a Man" for their hit single "Whatta Man", which was a massive hit. In the wake of the single's success, Lyndell began performing again, and in 2003, at the opening of the Stax Museum, she performed "What a Man" live for the first time ever. In a 2024 interview with WUFT-FM, Lyndell said, "It turned out to be a wonderful thing that [Salt-n-Pepa] sampled the song. We made friends that we would've never met."

== Discography ==
- "Bring Your Love Back to Me"/"Here Am I" (1967)
- "What a Man"/"I Don't Know" (1968)
