= Weme =

Weme may refer to:

- Weme language, Fon language
- Weme Province, old English name of Ouémé Department, Benin
- Weme, old spelling of Weem, Perthshire
- Weme, Minnesota
- Weme (EP), by Korean girl group Weki Meki, 2017
