= Restore (EP) =

- Digital cover

EP by Jinjin & Rocky
- Released: January 17, 2022
- Genre: K-pop
- Length: 16:06
- Languages: Korean; English
- Labels: Fantagio; Kakao

Singles from Restore
- 1. "Just Breath" Released: January 17, 2022

Restore is the debut and only extended play by South Korean duo Jinjin & Rocky, a sub-unit of the boy band Astro. It was released on January 17, 2022, through Fantagio and Kakao Entertainment. The EP was promoted by the lead single "Just Breath", (Note: Although the word "breathe" is sung in the song, the song's English title is given in official sources (the artwork, label paraphernalia and on music platforms) as "Just Breath".) released the same day along with its music video.

== Promotion ==
Throughout December 2021 and January 2022, Fantagio released video teasers and concept posters for the EP on their social media, including imagery of "humanoid blobs" and references to social distancing in the wake of the COVID-19 pandemic. The EP more broadly has a vacation theme and a "summer vibe".

== Track listing ==
Restore track listing
No.	Title	Lyrics	Music	Arrangement	Length
1.	"Just Breath" (숨 좀 쉬자)	Jinjin; Rocky; OBROS	Jinjin; Rocky; OBROS; Nomasgood	OBROS; Nomasgood	3:23
2.	"Lazy" (Jinjin featuring Choi Yoo-jung of Weki Meki)	Jinjin; Orae; Sam Carter; Dash Guy	Jinjin; Orae; Sam Carter; Dash Guy	Jinjin; Orae; Sam Carter; Dash Guy	3:10
3.	"Lock Down"	Jinjin; Orae; Sam Carter; Dash Guy	Jinjin; Orae; Sam Carter; Dash Guy	Jinjin; Orae; Sam Carter; Dash Guy	3:02
4.	"Complete Me" (Rocky solo)	Rocky; Enzo; OBROS	Rocky; OBROS	OBROS	2:32
5.	"CPR" (Rocky solo)	Rocky; OBROS	Rocky; OBROS	OBROS	3:59
Total length:					16:06

== Charts ==
=== Weekly charts ===
Chart performance for Restore
Chart (2022)	Peak position
Japan Hot Albums (Billboard Japan)	31
Japanese Albums (Oricon)	12
South Korean Albums (Gaon)	7

=== Monthly charts ===
Monthly chart performance for Restore
Chart (2022)	Peak position
Japanese Albums (Oricon)	46
South Korean Albums (Gaon)	11
