= Lucky (Weki Meki EP) =

EP by Weki Meki
- Released: February 21, 2018
- Genre: K-pop; House; Nu-disco; R&B
- Length: 18:13
- Label: Fantagio Music

Weki Meki chronology
Weme (2017)	Lucky (2018)	Kiss, Kicks (2018)

Singles from Lucky
- 1. "La La La" Released: February 21, 2018

Lucky is the second extended play by South Korean girl group Weki Meki. It was released on February 21, 2018, by Fantagio Music and distributed by Interpark. It consists of six songs, including the title track "La La La".

The EP peaked at number 2 on the Gaon Album Chart. It has sold over 31,609 physical copies as of May 2018.

== Background and release ==
On January 4, 2018, Fantagio revealed that the group's comeback was being delayed indefinitely due to "the timing of the comeback, problems with the album preparation process, and the company's internal affairs". On January 11, the group released "Butterfly" as a digital single in support of the 2018 PyeongChang Winter Olympics. On February 1, after initial reports of "indefinite delay" in their comeback plans, the group confirmed in a press release for their reality show, Weki Meki, What’s Up?, that they were preparing to release an album in late-February, continuing with their "girl crush" concept from their debut album.

On February 6, Fantagio released a schedule for their new album, revealing the name as Lucky. From February 6 to February 11, image teaser were revealed with pre-orders for the album starting on February 7. On February 12, the full track list was posted, revealing that the album will include 5 songs, including "Butterfly", previously released, and the title track "La La La". A day later, an album medley was released through the group's official YouTube channel.

The EP was released through several music portals, including MelOn in South Korea and iTunes globally.

== Commercial performance ==
Lucky debuted at number 2 on the Gaon Album Chart, on the chart issue dated February 18–24, 2018, marking a new peak for the group, as Weme peaked at number 7. Also, a Smart Music Card edition of the album debuted at number 31.

The album placed at number 8 for the month of February 2018, with 20,539 physical copies sold in its standard edition and at number 79 with 1,089 copies in its SMC edition. The album sold 21,628 combined sales in February. It has sold over 31,609 physical copies as of May 2018.

== Track listing ==
No.	Title	Lyrics	Music	Arrangement	Length
1.	"Lucky"	Seo Ji-eum	Shin Hyuk; M Rey; Rodnae 'Chikk' Bell; Ashley Alisha	Shin Hyuk; M Rey	1:12
2.	"La La La"	Seo Ji-eum	Shin Hyuk; Royal Dive; Rodnae 'Chikk' Bell	Royal Dive	2:50
3.	"Iron Boy"	Jinri (Full8loom)	Glory Face (Full8loom); Jake K (Full8loom); Jinri (Full8loom)	Glory Face (Full8loom); Jake K (Full8loom)	3:18
4.	"Metronome"	Le'mon	Trippy; Le'mon	Trippy; Minshikyi	3:22
5.	"Color Me"	Jinli (Full8loom)	Glory Face (Full8loom); Jake K (Full8loom); Jinri (Full8loom)	Glory Face (Full8loom); Jake K (Full8loom)	3:40
6.	"Butterfly (Note: The song is a cover of the 2008 song "butterfly" by South Korean band Loveholics, which also was the original sound track for the 2009 movie Take off, a movie about the South korean ski jumping team for the winter olympics.)" (2018 PyeongChang Winter Olympics Special)	Kang Hyun-min; Lee Jae-hak	Lee Jae-hak	Glory Face (Full8loom); Jake K (Full8loom)	3:47
Total length:					18:19

== Charts ==
Chart (2018)	Peak position
South Korean Albums (Gaon)	2
