= Kiss, Kicks =

2018 K-pop album by Weki Meki

Single album by Weki Meki
- Released: October 11, 2018
- Genre: K-pop; moombahton; hip hop
- Label: Fantagio Music; Interpark

Weki Meki chronology
Lucky (2018)	Kiss, Kicks (2018)	Lock End LOL (2019)

Music video
- "Crush" on YouTube

Kiss, Kicks is the first single album by South Korean girl group Weki Meki. It was released on October 11, 2018, by Fantagio Music and distributed by Interpark. It consists of three songs, including the title track "Crush".

== Background ==
On September 22, 2018, it was announced that the group would release their first single album, Kiss, Kicks, on October 11 with a teen crush concept. On October 5, a 'highlight medley' was released, revealing snippets for the three songs.

== Track listing ==
No.	Title	Lyrics	Music	Arrangement	Length
1.	"Crush"	TENTEN; Choi Yoo-jung	TENTEN	TENTEN	3:16
2.	"True Valentine"	JQ; Son Ji-ah; Choi Yoo-jung	Steven Lee; Nanna Larsen; Jow Lawrence	Joe Lawrence	4:17
3.	"Dear."	Jinri (Full8loom)	Glory Face (Full8oom); Jake K (Full8loom); Jinri (Full8loom)	Glory Face (Full8oom); Jake K (Full8loom)	3:03
Total length:					10:36

== Charts ==
Chart (2018)	Peak position
South Korean Albums (Gaon)	5
