= New Rules (Weki Meki EP) =

EP by Weki Meki
- Released: October 8, 2020
- Genre: K-pop; hip-hop; R&B
- Length: 16:59
- Label: Fantagio Music; Kakao M
- Producer: Jake K; Jere Särkkä; Ylva Dimberg; RHeaT; Tysha Tiar; Audi Mok; Ciara Muscat; Kim Mong-yi; Village; real-fantasy; Ji Suyeon

Weki Meki chronology
| Hide and Seek (2020) | New Rules (2020) | I Am Me. (2021) |

Singles from New Rules
- 1. "Cool" Released: October 8, 2020

New Rules (stylized as NEW RULES) is the fourth extended play by South Korean girl group Weki Meki. It was released on October 8, 2020, by Fantagio Music and distributed by Kakao M. It consists of five tracks, including the title track "Cool" and its English version "100 Facts".

== Release ==
The EP was released on October 8, 2020, through several music portals, including MelOn, Spotify and Apple Music. Music video for the title track was released on the same day.

== Commercial performance ==
The EP debuted and peaked at number 13 on the Gaon Album Chart for the week ending October 11, 2020, and placed within the Top 100 for five consecutive weeks.

New Rules was the 34th best-selling album in October 2020 with 9,421 copies sold. It has sold 12,207 copies as of November 2020.

== Track listing ==
| No. | Title | Lyrics | Music | Arrangement | Length |
|---|---|---|---|---|---|
| 1. | "Cool" | Lee Ji-Eun; Miseong; Iseulan; Ieyum; Dalli; ZNEE | Jake K (ARTiffect); Ylva Dimberg; Jere Särkkä | Jake K (ARTiffect) | 3:29 |
| 2. | "Sweet Dreams" | Jo Yoon-kyung; Audi Mok; Tysha Tiar | RHeaT (CODE 9); Audi Mok; Tysha Tiar | RHeaT (CODE 9) | 3:32 |
| 3. | "D-Day" | HotSauce | Kim Mong-yi; Ciara Muscat | Kim Mong-yi | 2:49 |
| 4. | "Just Us" | Rina; Lucy; Choi Yoojung | Ji Suyeon; Village | real-fantasy | 3:23 |
| 5. | "100 Facts (Cool Eng. Ver.)" | Ylva Dimberg | Jake K (ARTiffect); Ylva Dimberg; Jere Särkkä | Jake K (ARTiffect) | 3:45 |
| Total length: | | | | | 16:59 |

== Charts ==
| Chart (2020) | Peak position |
|---|---|
| South Korean Albums (Gaon) | 13 |
