= I Am Me. =

EP by Weki Meki
- Released: November 18, 2021
- Genre: K-pop; Hip hop; R&B
- Length: 20:04
- Label: Fantagio; Kakao M

Weki Meki chronology
| New Rules (2020) | I Am Me. (2021) |

Singles from I Am Me.
- 1. "Siesta" Released: November 18, 2021

I Am Me. is the fifth and final extended play by South Korean girl group Weki Meki. It was released on November 18, 2021, by Fantagio and distributed by Kakao Entertainment. It consists of six tracks, including the title track "Siesta", it was their last EP prior to the disbandment was announced on 2024.

== Pre-release ==
The album was announced on November 8, 2021, with a "coming soon" poster. On the same day, Fantagio posted the release scheduler. Leading up to the album, a mood film for posted for each member, with lines that the members wrote themselves. Accompanying the mood films, two sets of promotional images were released for each member.

On November 12, the track list for the mini album was announced. It was also revealed that there is going to be only one version of the physical album. The album comes with a 136-page photo book.

On November 15, the first teaser for the Siesta music video was released.

== Release ==
The EP was released on November 18, 2021, through several music portals, including MelOn, Spotify and Apple Music. Music video for the title track was released on the same day. Fantagio organized an album showcase event that was broadcast through the streaming service VLIVE.

== Commercial performance ==
The EP debuted and peaked at number 12 on the Gaon Album Chart for the week ending October 20, 2021, and placed within the Top 100 for six consecutive weeks.

I Am Me. was the 53rd best-selling album in November 2021 with 11,377 copies sold. It has sold 17,366 copies as of December 2021.

== Track listing ==
| No. | Title | Lyrics | Music | Arrangement | Length |
|---|---|---|---|---|---|
| 1. | "Siesta" | Lee Na Yoon; Jeong Joo Yeon; Im Ga In; Sophiya; Anna Timgren; Alawn; Musikality | Anna Timgren; Alawn; Musikality | Alawn | 3:54 |
| 2. | "Who Am I" | ROBBIN; C'SA | ROBBIN; C'SA; Jun Joon; Lee Gwang Sun; Shin Yong Hee; Lee Joohyun | Lee Joohyun; Shin Yong Hee; Lee Gwang Sun; Jun Joon; ROBBIN | 2:57 |
| 3. | "Luminous" | J14; Ji In; SUNPEACH | Anna Timgren; SAN; ZENUR; Fascinador | ZENUR; Fascinador | 3:17 |
| 4. | "Sweet Winter" | Ji Suyeon; Kim Su Jeong; Eun Jong Tae; Ryu Min Kyung | Ralz; Daniel Michael Victor; Amanda Thomsen | Ralz; Daniel Michael Victor | 2:58 |
| 5. | "First Dream" | Jo Yoon-kyung | J-Hype; JJean | J-Hype | 3:29 |
| 6. | "One Day" | Ji Suyeon; Su Kyung | Ji Suyeon; Le'mon; Su Kyung; RAMI NU; Sam Carter; NOMASGOOD | NOMASGOOD; Jabong | 3:26 |
| Total length: | | | | | 20:04 |

== Charts ==
| Chart (2021) | Peak position |
|---|---|
| South Korean Albums (Gaon) | 12 |
