= Hide and Seek (Weki Meki EP) =

EP by Weki Meki
- Released: June 18, 2020
- Genre: Dance-pop; Hip hop; moombahton; retro; R&B
- Length: 16:25
- Label: Fantagio Music; Kakao M
- Producer: Stainboys; Jonas Mengler; CR Kim; Aiming; Cho Se-hee; Lee Joo-heon; The Far Eastern Division; Jeong Tae-ho

Weki Meki chronology
Lock End LOL (2019)	Hide and Seek (2020)	New Rules (2020)

Singles from Hide and Seek
- 1. "Dazzle Dazzle" Released: February 20, 2020; 2. "Oopsy" Released: June 18, 2020

Hide and Seek (stylized as HIDE and SEEK) is the third extended play by South Korean girl group Weki Meki. It was released on June 18, 2020, by Fantagio Music and distributed by Kakao M. It consists of five tracks, including the previously released singles "Dazzle Dazzle" and "Oopsy".

== Release ==
The EP was released on June 18, 2020, through several music portals, including MelOn and Apple Music.

== Commercial performance ==
The EP debuted and peaked at number 13 on the Gaon Album Chart for the week ending June 20, 2020. In its second week, the album fell to number 53 and climb to number 41 in its third week and to number 28 in its fourth week. The EP placed within the Top 100 for five consecutive weeks.

Hide and Seek was the 41st best-selling album in June 2020 with 12,759 copies sold. It has sold 16,848 copies as of July 2020.

== Track listing ==
No.	Title	Lyrics	Music	Arrangement	Length
1.	"Oopsy"	Jung Yoon (153/Joombas)	Moon Kim; Jarry Potter (Yummy Tone); Stainboys	Stainboys	3:14
2.	"Moya Moya"	Hwang Hyun (MonoTree)	Lee Joo-hyung (MonoTree); Onestar (MonoTree); Jonas Mengler	Jonas Mengler	3:27
3.	"The Paradise"	Ji Su-yeon (Weki Meki); Kim Soo-bin (Aiming); Lee Joo-heon	Ji Su-yeon (Weki Meki); CR Kim; Kim Soo-bin (Aiming); Cho Se-hee; Lee Joo-heon	CR Kim; Kim Soo-bin (Aiming); Cho Se-hee; Lee Joo-heon	2:56
4.	"Youniverse"	Jung Young-ah	The Far Eastern Division; Jeong Tae-ho	The Far Eastern Division; Jeong Tae-ho	3:39
5.	"Dazzle Dazzle"	Danke (Lalala Studio); Stainboys; Anna Timgren	Stainboys; Anna Timgren	Stainboys	3:09
Total length:					16:25

== Charts ==
Chart (2020)	Peak position
South Korean Albums (Gaon)	13
