= Sunflower (single album) =

Single album by Yoojung
- Released: September 14, 2022
- Recorded: 2022
- Genre: K-pop
- Language: Korean
- Label: Fantagio

Yoojung chronology
Sunflower (2022)	Perfect Target (2026)

Singles from Sunflower
- 1. "Sunflower (P.E.L)" Released: September 14, 2022

Sunflower is the debut single album by South Korean singer Yoojung. It was released by Fantagio on September 14, 2022, and contains three tracks, including the lead single of the same name.

== Background and release ==
On August 23, it was reported that Choi would make her solo debut in September. It was confirmed by Fantagio that Choi will make her solo debut with the single album Sunflower which will be released on September 14, 2022. On August 29, the prologue film was released with the scheduler being released on August 30. The track list consisting of 3 tracks was released on August 31. The first and second concept photos were released on September 1 and 2 respectively. Choi released the album preview on September 5. The third and fourth concept photos were released on September 6 and 7 respectively. The highlight medley was released on September 8. The music video teaser was released on September 13. The album, along with the music video for the title track, was released on September 14.

== Track listing ==
Sunflower track listing
No.	Title	Lyrics	Music	Arrangement	Length
1.	"Sunflower (P.E.L)"	Ellie Suh (153/Joombas); Yoojung	Alina Smith (153/Joombas); Gino Barletta; Scott Bruzenak; Annalise Morelli	Lyre; Gino Barletta; Scott Bruzenak; Annalise Morelli	3:01
2.	"Tip Tip Toes"	Jo Yoon-kyung; Yoojung	Alysa; Avenue 52; Anna Timgren	Alysa	3:27
3.	"Owl"	Seo Ji-eun; Moon Kim	Moon Kim; Seo Ji-eun	Seo Ji-eun; Moon Kim	3:39
Total length:					10:09

== Charts ==
=== Weekly charts ===
Weekly chart performance for Sunflower
Chart (2022)	Peak position
South Korean Albums (Circle)	14

=== Monthly charts ===
Monthly chart performance for Sunflower
Chart (2022)	Peak position
South Korean Albums (Circle)	54

== Release history ==
Release dates and formats for Sunflower
Region	Date	Format	Label	Ref.
Various	September 14, 2022	CD; digital download; streaming	Fantagio	
South Korea	September 14, 2022	CD; digital download; streaming	Fantagio	
