= Jinjin & Rocky =

South Korean duo

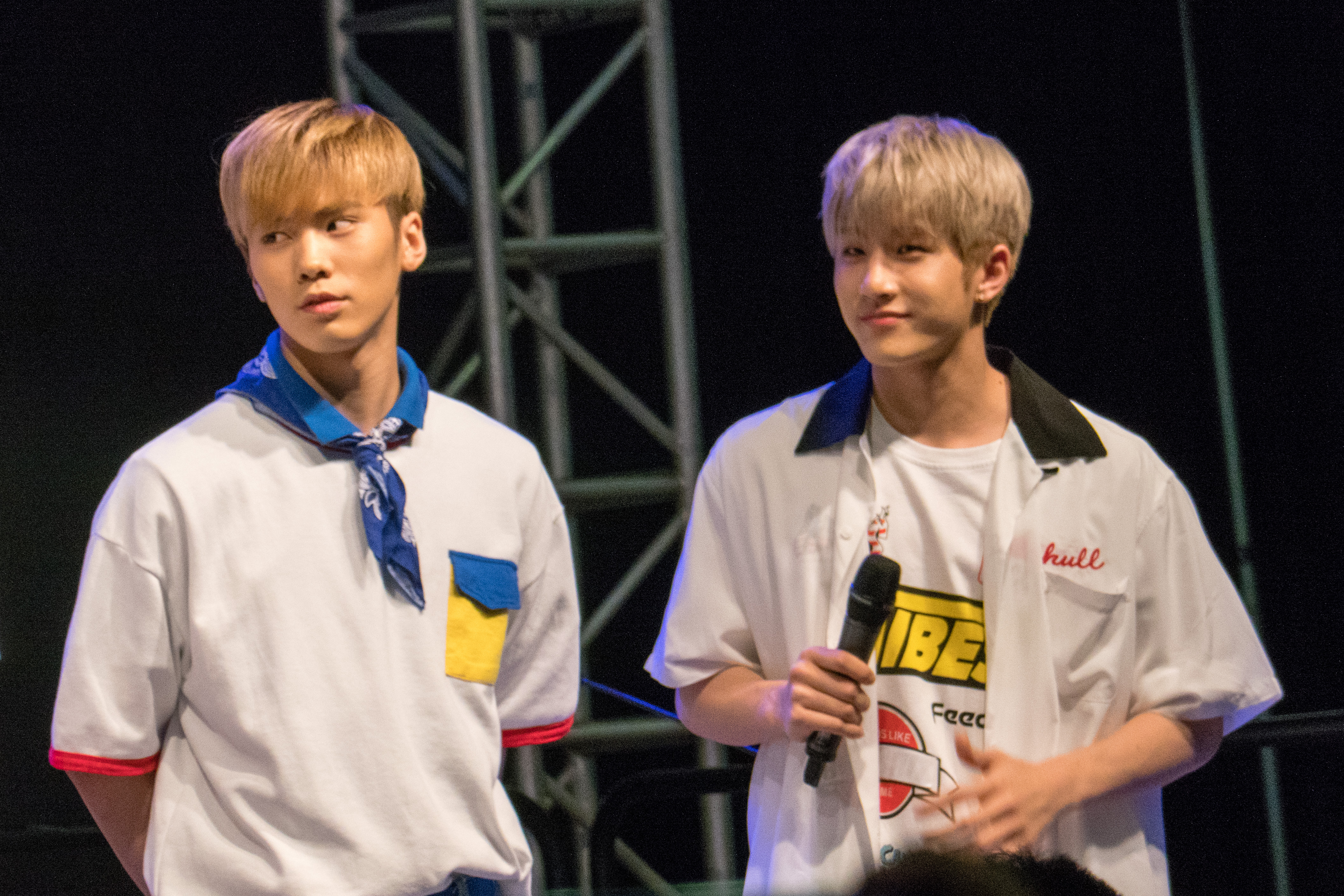
- Rocky and Jinjin in 2016

Background information
- Origin: Seoul, South Korea
- Genres: K-pop; Hip hop
- Years active: 2022–2023
- Labels: Fantagio
- Spinoff of: Astro
- Past members: Jinjin; Rocky
- Website: www.fantagio.kr/musicians/진진&라키/

Jinjin & Rocky (Korean: 진진&라키) was the second official sub-unit of South Korean boy band Astro. The duo was formed by Fantagio in 2022, and was composed of two members: Jinjin and Rocky. Their debut extended play, Restore, was released on January 17, 2022.

== Career ==
=== Pre-debut ===
On December 27, 2021, Fantagio released a surprise image teaser announcing that Jinjin and Rocky would form a duo and release their EP Restore the next month. It was revealed that the EP title means Recovery and the duo planned to deliver healing in their own way from the COVID-19 situation. Both Jinjin & Rocky were active as the main rappers and dancers of Astro.

=== 2022–2023: Debut with Restore and disbandment ===
On January 17, Jinjin & Rocky officially debuted with the EP Restore and its lead single, "Just Breath" (Note: Although the word "breathe" is sung in the song, the song's official English title is written as "Just Breath".) (숨좀쉬자). The EP contains five songs of various genres—two songs sung by Jinjin & Rocky, two solo songs sung by Rocky and one song sung by Jinjin that features Weki Meki's Choi Yoo-jung. Jinjin and Rocky were actively involved in the production of all songs.

On February 28, 2023, Rocky did not renew his contract and thus left Fantagio and Astro, thereby ending the duo sub-unit.

== Discography ==
=== Extended plays ===
List of EPs, with selected details
Title	Details	Peak chart positions		Sales
Title	Details	KOR	JPN	Sales
Restore	Released: January 17, 2022; Label: Fantagio; Formats: CD, music download, streaming	7	12	KOR: 72,015; JPN: 6,883

=== Singles ===
List of singles, showing year released, selected chart positions, and name of the album
Title	Year	Peak chart positions	Album
Title	Year	KOR	Album
"Just Breath" (숨 좀 쉬자)	2022	77	Restore
