= Dusk (Yoon San-ha EP) =

- Digital cover

EP by Yoon San-ha
- Released: August 6, 2024
- Genre: K-pop
- Length: 19:24
- Languages: Korean; English
- Label: Fantagio Music

Singles from Dusk
- 1. "Dive" Released: August 6, 2024

Dusk is the debut extended play (EP) by South Korean singer Yoon San-ha of the boy band Astro. It was released on August 6, 2024, by Fantagio. The EP contains six tracks, including the lead single "Dive".

== Commercial performance ==
The EP sold 54,413+ copies in South Korea and 4,392 in Japan. It peaked at number 2 on the South Korean Circle Album Chart and number 13 on Japanese Oricon Albums Chart.

== Track listing ==
Dusk track listing
No.	Title	Length
1.	"Yeowoobyul"	4:33
2.	"Losing My Mind"	3:35
3.	"Bittersweet Mistake"	2:50
4.	"Dive"	2:49
5.	"Bleeding"	3:00
6.	"Rain Down on Me"	3:17
Total length:		19:24

== Charts ==
=== Weekly charts ===
Weekly chart performance for Dusk
Chart (2024)	Peak position
Japanese Albums (Oricon)	13
South Korean Albums (Circle)	2

=== Monthly charts ===
Monthly chart performance for Dusk
Chart (2024)	Peak position
South Korean Albums (Circle)	18
