= Yogobara =

Television program

- Promotional poster
- Genre: Variety
- Presented by: Umji; Yoon Sanha
- Country of origin: South Korea
- Original language: Korean
- No. of seasons: 1
- No. of episodes: 10

Production
- Production location: South Korea
- Running time: 30 minutes

Original release
- Network: SBS MTV
- Release: July 29 – September 30, 2018

Yogobara (Korean: 요고바라; acronym in Korean for 요즘 고딩들의 바깥 라이프; lit. Social Life of High Schoolers Nowadays) is a South Korean television program which aired on SBS MTV every Sunday at 10:30 (KST). It was also simulcasted through Naver V Live. The show began on July 29, 2018. The show aired for 10 episodes for its first season.

Yogobara is hosted by Umji and Yoon Sanha. It is a program that empathises with teenagers, especially those in the range of 13 and 18 years old, by listening to their concerns and worries, and providing tips to ease difficulties they face in their social life.

== Format ==
Teenagers are recommended to share their concerns through social media (10jam app and Yogobara official Twitter account). The hosts would then read some of these concerns that were shared during the episodes and personally take turns to share tips (Umji's Tips and Sanha's Tips) for them. Some of the tips include beauty tips, exercise tips, diet tips and life hacks.

Each episode would focus on different keywords or topics that is related to teenagers. The concerns read and the tips provided for each episode will be matched to the keyword of that episode. For the first 4 episodes, at the end of the episode, one or two music videos of Kpop songs that are related to the keyword would be played as an ending to the show.

During the filming of the last episode (Episode 10), they did a live broadcast entitled Yogobara Live Talk on Naver V Live app where the hosts had an interactive session with the viewers and also played some games. An edited version of the live broadcast was included in the last episode of the show.

== Episodes ==
In each episode, the program will focus on a keyword or a topic.

Episode	Broadcast Date	Keyword(s)	Note(s)	Ref.
1	Jul 29, 2018	Great Appetite of Teenagers	—	
2	Aug 05, 2018	Vacation	—	
3	Aug 12, 2018	Full of Excitement/Fun	Moonbin and SinB appeared as guests	
4	Aug 19, 2018	Boys and Girls with Dreams	—	
5	Aug 26, 2018	Little but Certain Happiness	—	
6	Sep 2, 2018	After School Activities	—	
7	Sep 9, 2018	Good Tip If You Know It, Doomed If You Don't	—	
8	Sep 16, 2018	A Very Small Generation Gap (Part 1)	Hyemi and Ravi appeared as guests	
9	Sep 23, 2018	A Very Small Generation Gap (Part 2)	Hyemi and Ravi appeared as guests	
10	Sep 30, 2018	(I Am Not Able to Do This, so) Please Do This in My Place!	—	
