= Kim Do-yeon (singer) =

South Korean singer and actress (born 1999)

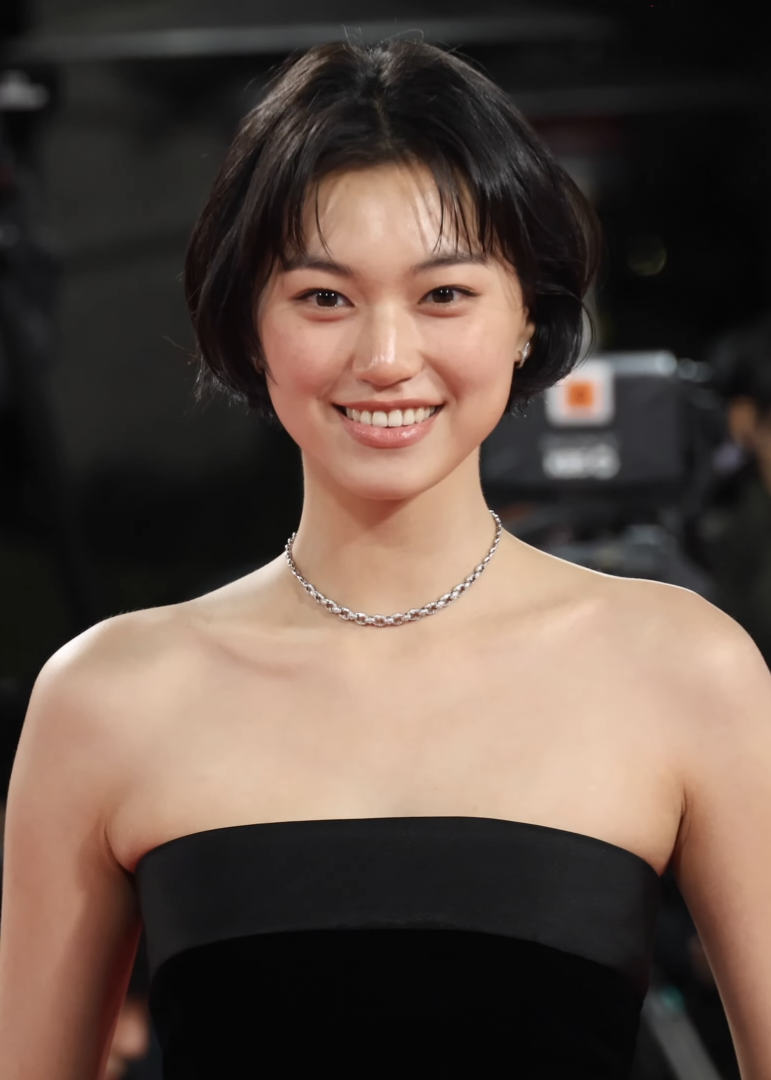
- Kim in November 2025
- Born: December 4, 1999 (age 26); Incheon, South Korea
- Education: School of Performing Arts Seoul
- Occupations: Singer; actress
- Musical career
- Genre: K-pop
- Instrument: Vocals
- Years active: 2016–present
- Labels: Fantagio; YMC (Note: As a member of I.O.I only.); Swing; Studio Blu
- Formerly of: I.O.I; I.O.I sub-unit; WJMK; Weki Meki

Korean name
- Hangul: 김도연
- Hanja: 金度延
- RR: Gim Doyeon
- MR: Kim Toyŏn

Kim Do-yeon (Korean: 김도연; Hanja: 金度延; born December 4, 1999), known mononymously as Doyeon, is a South Korean singer and actress signed under Fantagio. She is best known as a contestant on the Mnet reality show Produce 101, as a member of the resulting group I.O.I, and subsequently as a member of Weki Meki. In 2018, she appeared on Law of the Jungle and made her acting debut in the drama Short (2018).

== Early life and education ==
Kim Do-yeon was born on December 4, 1999. She attended Sangji Girls' High School where she was captain of the cheerleading team but eventually transferred to School of Performing Arts Seoul with fellow I.O.I and Weki Meki member Choi Yoo-jung after debuting as singers due to their promotional activities.

== Career ==
=== 2016–2017: Produce 101 and I.O.I ===
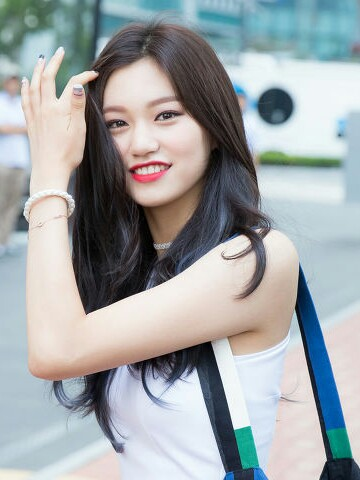
Kim in 2016

In January 2016, Kim participated in the Mnet reality-survival program Produce 101, which aimed to form an eleven-member girl group that would promote for a year under YMC Entertainment. She represented Fantagio along with Choi Yoo-jung and three other trainees from their company, eventually ranking eight in the show's finale on April 1, 2016. As a result, she debuted as a member of I.O.I alongside Choi. On May 4, 2016, I.O.I made their official debut with the single "Dream Girls".

=== 2017–2021: Weki Meki and WJMK ===
After the official disbandment of I.O.I on January 29, 2017, Choi and Kim traveled to the United States to film their reality show, Dodaeng's Diary in LA which aired on TVING. Doyeon was cast in the web series, Idol Fever. Doyeon made her debut as a member of Weki Meki on August 8, 2017, with the release of the single "I Don't Like Your Girlfriend" and the six-track EP Weme. Doyeon was featured in LONG:D's single, "All Night", released on December 14, 2017.

In February 2018, Kim made her acting debut after getting cast in a drama titled Short in which she played a supporting role. On May 2, 2018, Starship Entertainment and Fantagio collaborated to form a special four-member unit named WJMK, consisting of members of their respective girl groups Cosmic Girls and Weki Meki. Choi and Kim, together with Seola and Luda of Cosmic Girls, released the single "Strong" on June 1, 2018, along with its accompanying music video. Kim was part of the cast of Shoot-out Mart War alongside Cha Eun-woo, Park Soo-ah and many more. In July, Kim joined the cast of the SBS reality show Law of the Jungle in Last Indian Ocean. Doyeon made a cameo appearance on the JTBC romantic comedy drama, Be Melodramatic. Kim starred in the web drama Pop Out Boy! in 2020. The same year, she starred in Single and Ready to Mingle alongside Choi Yoo-jung.

On May 4, 2021, Kim Do-yeon and the members of I.O.I celebrated their 5th debut anniversary with a reunion live stream show called "Yes, I Love It!". The same year, Kim participated in the drama My Roommate Is a Gumiho which aired on tvN. Kim appeared in the tvN drama Jirisan as the teenager version of Jun Ji-hyun's character. Kim also appeared in the SBS drama One the Woman as the younger counterpart of Lee Hanee.

=== 2022–present: Solo career ===
On March 1, 2022, Doyeon was chosen by global makeup brand Bobbi Brown and launched a new campaign "The Radiant Power Fair", in partnership with Lachica's Shimizu. On August 10, 2023, Kim was cast in the film 18 Youth alongside Jeon So-min, in which she plays an 18-year-old high school student who is annoyed by her eccentric homeroom teacher.

On February 1, 2024, Kim was cast in the film Idiot Girls and School Ghost: School Anniversary, in which she plays Ji-Yeon a president of the broadcasting club at Seogwang Girls' High School and a cinephile who dreams of becoming a film director, and she will display an abundance of energy. On August 16, Fantagio announced that Weki Meki had effectively disbanded on August 8 after five members left the agency. However, Kim was still in discussions of renewing her contract with the agency. On November 18, Fantagio announced that Kim had renewed her exclusive contract with the agency.

On January 6, 2025, it was confirmed that Kim was cast to play the role 'Anna' in the musical Anna X, which will begin airing on January 28, 2025. On March 28, The series Heesu In Class 2, which Kim filmed in 2022, has been released.

Kim at the Dora Outdoor Stage Greeting during the 31st Busan International Film Festival

In 2026, Kim starred as the titular character in the film Dora, directed by July Jung. It premiered at the 79th Cannes Film Festival and is set to be released in the second half of 2026 in South Korea.

== Discography ==
=== Singles ===
Title	Year	Album
As featured artist
"All Night" (Long:D feat. Kim Do-yeon)	2017	The Girl from Back Then
Soundtrack appearances
"Again and Again" (자꾸만) (Note: Credited as a song by Weki Meki, but sung by Yoojung and Doyeon.)	2021	Single & Ready to Mingle OST Part 1

== Videography ==
=== Music videos ===
Title	Year	Album
"All Night" (Long:D featuring Kim Do-yeon)	2017	The Girl from Back Then

== Filmography ==
=== Film ===
Year	Title	Role	Ref.
2024	Idiot Girls and School Ghost: "School Anniversary"	Ji-yeon	
2026	Eighteen Youth	Lee Sun-jung	
2026	Dora	Dora	

=== Television series ===
Year	Title	Role	Notes	Ref.
2018	Short	Yoo Ji-na		
2019	Be Melodramatic	Actress	Cameo (Episode 2–3)	
2021	My Roommate Is a Gumiho	Gye Seo-woo		
2021	One the Woman	Cho Yeon-joo / Kang Mi-na (young)	Cameo	
2021	Jirisan	Seo Yi-kang (teenager)	Cameo	

=== Web series ===
Year	Title	Role	Notes	Ref.
2015	To Be Continued	Student	Cameo	
2017	Idol Fever	Doyeon		
2020	Pop Out Boy!	Han Sun-nyeo		
2020	Single & Ready to Mingle	Ji Yeon-seo		
2025	Heesu in Class 2	Choi Ji-yu		

=== Television shows ===
Year	Title	Role	Notes	Ref.
2016	Produce 101	Contestant	Survival show that determined I.O.I members Finished 8th	
2018	Law of the Jungle in Last Indian Ocean	Cast member	Episode 338–339	

=== Web shows ===
Year	Title	Role	Notes	Ref.
2017	Dodaeng's Diary in LA (도댕 다이어리)	Cast member	with Yoojung	
2018	Shoot-out Mart War (찍히면 죽는다)	Cast member		

=== Hosting ===
Year	Title	Notes	Ref.
2021	Dream Concert	with Cha Eun-woo and Leeteuk	

== Theater ==
Year	Title	Role	Ref.
2025	Anna X	Anna	

== Awards and nominations ==
Name of the award ceremony, year presented, category, nominee of the award, and the result of the nomination
Award ceremony	Year	Category	Nominee / Work	Result	Ref.
Blue Dragon Film Awards	2025	Best New Actress	Idiot Girls and School Ghost: School Anniversary	Won	
