= Dazzle Dazzle =

2020 K-pop album by Weki Meki

Single by Weki Meki

from the EP Hide and Seek
- Released: February 20, 2020
- Genre: K-pop; hip hop; moombahton
- Length: 3:09
- Label: Fantagio Music; Kakao M
- Songwriters: Danke; STAINBOYS; Anna Timgren
- Producers: STAINBOYS; Anna Timgren

Weki Meki singles chronology
"Tiki-Taka (99%)" (2019)	"Dazzle Dazzle" (2020)	"Oopsy" (2020)

Music video
- "Dazzle Dazzle" on YouTube

"Dazzle Dazzle" (stylized as "DAZZLE DAZZLE") is a song by South Korean girl group Weki Meki. It was released as their first digital single on February 20, 2020, by Fantagio Music and distributed by Kakao M.

It was later included in their third extended play Hide and Seek (2020).

== Composition ==
"Dazzle Dazzle" is a pop dance song with a mix of hip-hop and moombahton. The addictive bass line and the cheerful, cool brass sound further enhance the dynamic atmosphere of the song. It was written by Danke, STAINBOYS and Anna Timgren, and produced by the later two.

== Background and release ==
On February 6, 2020, Fantagio Music confirmed that the group will have a comeback with digital single album Dazzle Dazzle on February 20, and confirmed that member Yoojung will join after her hiatus from October 2019. Concept photos were released on February 13 and 14 and a MV teaser on February 16. On February 18, a performance film was uploaded on the group's YouTube channel.

The single was released on February 20, 2020, through several music portals including iTunes and Melon.

== Commercial performance ==
"Dazzle Dazzle" failed to enter the Gaon Digital Chart, but debuted at number 141 on the componing Download Chart after three days of sales.

== Promotions ==
Weki Meki began promotions for their comeback on February 20, 2020, on M Countdown.

== Release history ==
Region	Date	Format	Labels
Various	February 20, 2020	Digital download, streaming	Fantagio Music, Kakao M
