= Yoon San-ha =

South Korean singer and actor (born 2000)

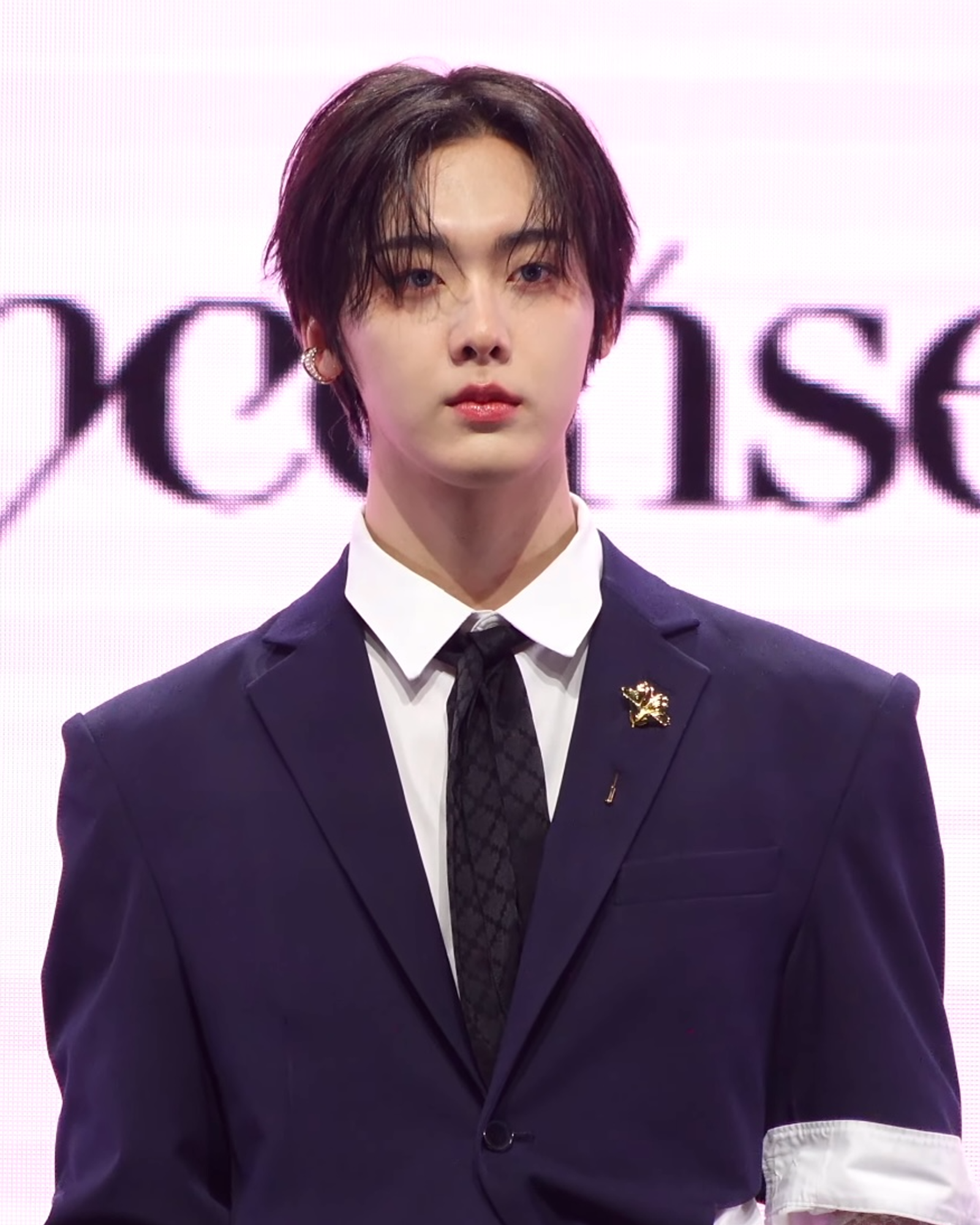
- Yoon in January 2023
- Born: March 21, 2000 (age 26); Seoul, South Korea
- Education: Hanlim Multi Art School
- Occupations: Singer; actor
- Height: 185 cm (6 ft 1 in)
- Musical career
- Genre: K-pop
- Instrument: Vocals
- Years active: 2015–present
- Label: Fantagio
- Member of: Astro
- Formerly of: Moonbin & Sanha

Korean name
- Hangul: 윤산하
- Hanja: 尹產賀
- RR: Yun Sanha
- MR: Yun Sanha

Yoon San-ha (Korean: 윤산하; born March 21, 2000), known mononymously as Sanha, is a South Korean singer and actor. He is a member of the South Korean boy group Astro and a former member of its sub-unit Moonbin & Sanha. Yoon made his acting debut in the web series To Be Continued in 2015. He later debuted as a solo artist with the extended play (EP) Dusk in 2024.

== Early life ==
Yoon San-ha was born on March 21, 2000. He graduated from Hanlim Multi Art School in 2019.

He is the youngest in his family and has 2 older brothers: Jun-ha and Je-ha.

== Career ==
=== 2013–2015: Career beginnings ===
Yoon was accepted as a Fantagio iTeen trainee on December 16, 2012. He was the third trainee to be officially introduced with the Fantagio iTeen Photo Test Cut. In August 2015, Yoon along with the other of his group participated in the web-drama To Be Continued.

=== 2016–2023: Debut with Astro, unit debut and solo activities ===
Yoon debuted as part of the six-member group Astro on February 23, 2016, with the mini album Spring Up.

In July 2018, Yoon was chosen as a host for the teenager-focused talk show Yogobara. He hosted alongside GFriend's Umji.

In July 2019, Yoon and MJ were confirmed to be the MCs of the TVN D's variety talk show Blanket Kick at Night.

On March 4, 2020, Yoon was announced to be a new host for Show Champion along with bandmate Moonbin and Verivery's Kangmin. On August 14, 2020, Fantagio confirmed that Yoon and Moonbin would form Astro's first sub-unit, called Moonbin & Sanha. On September 14, 2020, they released their first extended play called In-Out, with the title track "Bad Idea". They received their first win from SBS MTV's The Show marking their first win as a sub-unit and third win as Astro.

On September 16, 2021, Fantagio confirmed that Yoon would be starring in a web drama titled Your Playlist alongside DreamNote's Sumin. The web drama premiered on October 15, 2021. On November 19, 2021, It was revealed that Yoon has been cast in the South Korean production of hit Off-Broadway musical Altar Boyz. Yoon would play the role of Abraham and star alongside Golden Child's Y and Joochan, NU'EST's Baekho and SF9's Taeyang.

In 2022, Yoon joined the KBS drama Crazy Love which was his debut television drama. On December 30, 2022, Fantagio released an official statement and stated that Yoon had decided to renew his contract with the agency.

On April 19, 2023, after Moonbin's death, Yoon's sub-unit with him disbanded. On August 25, it was announced that Yoon would star in the Drama Special – Joseon Chefs, which was set to premiere on December 16.

=== 2024–present: Solo debut and rising popularity ===
On February 8, 2024, according to Fantagio, Yoon will be having intimate theater concert "SANiGHT Project #1". It began on March 20 in South Korea, and Japan. On July 8, Yoon was cast in a supporting role in the JTBC drama Romance in the House. On July 16, it was announced that Yoon would be making his solo debut with his first mini-album Dusk, which was released on August 6. On July 17, Yoon released a promotion scheduler for the album. On August 2, it was announced that Yoon would be starring in a webtoon based romance drama My Girlfriend Is the Man!. 4 days later, Dusk was released alongside its lead single "Dive".

== Other ventures ==
=== Fashion and endorsements ===
In December 2024, Yoon became a global ambassador for the American luxury brand Barneys New York Beauty.

== Discography ==
=== Extended plays ===
List of EPs, with selected details, chart positions and sales
Title	Details	Peak chart positions		Sales
Title	Details	KOR	JPN	Sales
Dusk	Released: August 6, 2024; Label: Fantagio Music; Formats: CD, download, streaming	2	13	KOR: 72,128; JPN: 4,392
Chameleon	Released: July 15, 2025; Label: Fantagio Music; Formats: CD, download, streaming	11	—	KOR: 64,036; JPN: 264 (dig.)
No Reason	Released: May 20, 2026; Label: Fantagio Music; Formats: CD, download, streaming	13	—	KOR: 46,287
"—" denotes a recording that did not chart or was not released in that territory.

=== Singles ===
==== As lead artist ====
Title	Year	Peak chart positions	Album
Title	Year	KOR	Album
"24 Hours" (24시간)	2022	— (Note: "24 Hours" did not enter the Gaon Digital Chart, but appeared at number 90 on the component Download Chart.)	Drive to the Starry Road
"Wish" (바람)	2023	— (Note: "Wish" did not enter the Circle Digital Chart, but appeared at number 17 on the component Download Chart.)	Incense
"Dive"	2024	122	Dusk
"Extra Virgin"	2025	—	Chameleon
"Idk Me"	2026	—	No Reason
"—" denotes releases that did not chart or were not released in that region.

==== Collaborations ====
Title	Year	Album
"Because I’m a Fool" (with Bily Acoustie)	2018	FM2018_12Hz

=== Soundtrack appearances ===
Title	Year	Album
"One More Chance" (with Chanmi of AOA)	2019	Love Formula 11M Original Soundtrack
"Break"	2020	Kkindae Original Soundtrack
"Lovey Dovey" (with Arin)	2025	My Girlfriend Is the Man! Original Soundtrack

=== Songwriting credits ===
All credits are listed under the Korea Music Copyright Association unless otherwise stated.

Year	Title	Artist	Album	Lyricist	Composer
"You & Me (Thanks Aroha)"	2017	Astro	Winter Dream	Yes	No
"By Your Side" (너의 뒤에서)	2018	Astro	Rise Up	Yes	No
"Merry-Go-Round (Christmas Edition)"	2018	Astro	Non-album single	Yes	No
"Merry-Go-Round"	2019	Astro	All Light	Yes	No
"My Zone"	2021	Astro	Switch On	No	Yes
"Wish" (바람)	2023	Himself	Incense	Yes	Yes

== Filmography ==
=== Television series ===
Year	Title	Role	Notes	Ref.
2022	Crazy Love	Lee Su-ho		
2023	Drama Special: "Choseon Chef"	Kim Yu	Season 14	
2024	Romance in the House	Byeon Hyun-jae		
2025	My Girlfriend Is the Man!	Park Yoon-jae		

=== Web series ===
Year	Title	Role	Ref.
2015	To Be Continued	Himself	
2019	Soul Plate	Angel Mirel	
2019–2020	Love Formula 11M	Tae-oh	
2021	Your Playlist	Big Daddy	

=== Television shows ===
Year	Title	Role	Notes	Ref.
2018	King of Mask Singer	Contestant (Autumn Boy)	Episode 171	
2018	Yogobara	MC	with Umji	
2019	Law of the Jungle – Myanmar	Cast member		
2020–2022	Show Champion	Host	with Moonbin and Kangmin	

=== Web shows ===
Year	Title	Role	Notes	Ref.
2021	Inssa Oppa	Cast		
2022	Challenge	Host	TikTok Stage On Air; with Moonbin	

== Theater ==
Year	Title	Role	Ref.
2021–2022	Altar Boyz	Abraham	
2024	Crash Landing on You	Ri Jeong-hyeok	

== Awards and nominations ==
Name of the award ceremony, year presented, category, nominee of the award, and the result of the nomination
Award ceremony	Year	Category	Nominee / Work	Result	Ref.
Fn New Trend Awards	2026	Multi-Entertainer Award	Yoon San-ha	Won	
KBS Drama Awards	2023	Best Actor in Drama Special/TV Cinema Award	Choseon Chefs	Nominated	
KM Chart Awards	2026	Best Popular Solo Male Award	Yoon San-ha	Nominated	
Seoul International Drama Awards	2026	Outstanding Korean Drama OST Award	"Lovey Dovey"	Nominated	
Seoul Music Awards	2026	Best Original Soundtrack Award	"Lovey Dovey"	Nominated	
Show Champion	2026	Best Solo Award	"No Reason"	Won	
