= Flower, Wind and You =

2016 single by Huihyeon, Chung Ha, Yoojung, Somi

Single by Ki Hui-hyeon, Jeon Somi, Choi Yoo-jung and Chung Ha
- Released: August 29, 2016
- Recorded: 2016
- Genre: K-pop
- Length: 3:41
- Label: MBK Entertainment
- Songwriters: 똘아이박; Peterpan; Ki Hui-hyeon
- Producer: Boi B

Ki Hui-hyeon singles chronology
"Flower, Wind and You" (2016)

Jeon Somi singles chronology
"Flower, Wind and You" (2016)	"You, Who?" (2017)

Choi Yoo-jung singles chronology
"Flower, Wind and You" (2016)	"Rise and Fall" (2017)

Chung Ha singles chronology
"Flower, Wind and You" (2016)	"Week" (2017)

Music video
- "Flower, Wind and You" on YouTube

"Flower, Wind and You" (Korean: 꽃, 바람 그리고 너; RR: Kkot, baram geurigo neo) is a song by South Korean singers, Ki Hui-hyeon, Jeon Somi, Choi Yoo-jung and Chung Ha. The single was released on 29 August 2016, by MBK Entertainment.

== Background ==
After the finale of Produce 101, it was announced that eliminated contestant Ki Hui-hyeon, would collaborate with I.O.I members, Chung Ha, Choi Yoo-jung and Jeon So-mi.

== Composition ==
"Flower, Wind and You" was written by 똘아이박, Peterpan and singer Ki Hui-hyeon.

== Release ==
The single was released on August 29, 2016, through several music portals.

== Music video ==
The music video was released on 29 August 2016, on MBK Entertainment's YouTube channel. Teasers were released prior to the date, and it stars DIA and I.O.I member Jung Chae-yeon.

== Charts ==
Chart (2019)	Peak position
South Korea (Gaon Digital)	42

== Sales ==
=== Download ===
Region	Certification	Certified units/sales
South Korea	—	38,862
