= Moonbin & Sanha =

South Korean duo

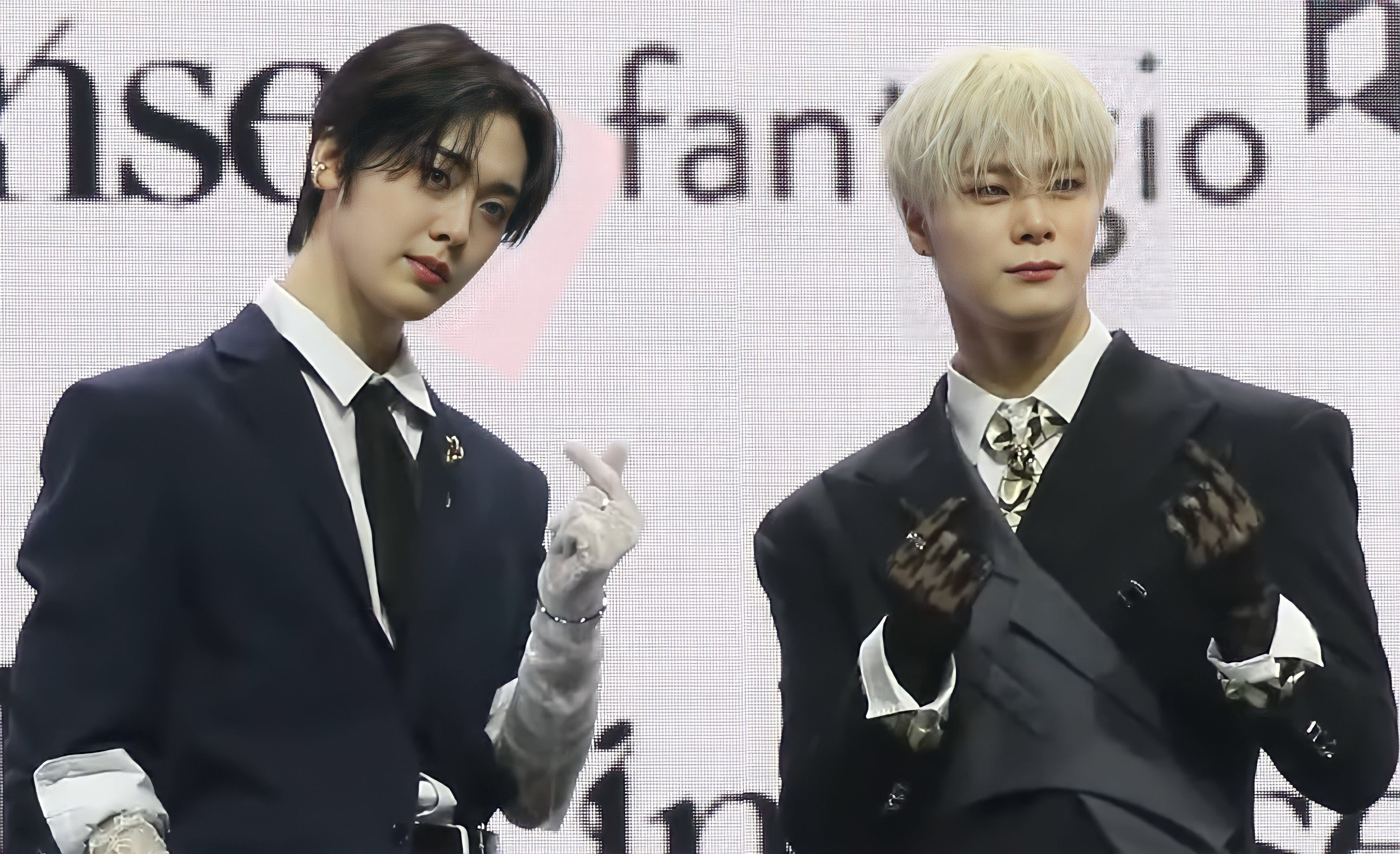
- From left to right: Yoon San-ha, Moonbin

Background information
- Origin: Seoul, South Korea
- Genre: K-pop
- Years active: 2020–2023
- Label: Fantagio
- Spinoff of: Astro
- Past members: Moonbin; Yoon San-ha
- Website: www.fantagio.kr/musicians/문빈&산하

Moonbin & Sanha (Korean: 문빈 & 산하) was the first official sub-unit of South Korean boy band Astro. Formed by Fantagio in 2020, the group was composed of two Astro members: Moonbin and Yoon San-ha. Their debut extended play, In-Out was released on September 14, 2020.

== Career ==
=== Pre-debut ===
On August 21, 2020, Fantagio Music released an image teaser with a logo and a date confirming that Moonbin and Sanha would form a sub-unit and release an EP in the next month. Before debut, both Moonbin and Sanha co-hosted the music show Show Champion since March 2020 along with Verivery's Kangmin. In a press Q&A, Moonbin and Sanha stated that their chemistry while co-hosting inspired them to form a sub-unit.

=== 2020–2023: Debut with In-Out, Refuge, and disbandment ===
On September 14, 2020, Moonbin & Sanha officially debuted with the EP In-Out and its title track, "Bad Idea". A week later, on September 22, they gained their first music show trophy with the single on SBS MTV The Show. A week after its release, In-Out debuted at number 9 on the weekly overseas album chart of Oricon and at number 2 on the weekly album chart of Gaon.

On February 11, 2022, Moonbin & Sanha released the pre-release single "Ghost Town", before the release of their second EP Refuge on March 15, featuring the title track "Who".

On December 3, 2022, Fantagio announced that Moonbin & Sanha would make a comeback on January 4, 2023, and scheduled to return with their third EP Incense.

Moonbin died on April 19, 2023, thus resulting in the sub-unit's disbandment. On April 27, Fantagio confirmed the unit's Weverse community would be shut down on April 30, nearly 2 weeks after its initial creation.

== Discography ==
=== Extended plays ===
| Title | Details | Peak chart positions | | Sales |
| Title | Details | KOR | JPN | Sales |
|---|---|---|---|---|
| In-Out | Released: September 14, 2020; Label: Fantagio; Formats: CD, digital download, streaming; Track listing: 1. "Eyez On U"; 2. "Bad Idea"; 3. "Alone" (섬); 4. "All I Wanna Do"; 5. "Dream Catcher" | 2 | 9 | KOR: 72,414; JPN: 14,382 |
| Refuge | Released: March 15, 2022; Label: Fantagio; Formats: CD, digital download, streaming; Track listing: 1. "Who"; 2. "Boo"; 3. "Dia"; 4. "Distance"; 5. "Ghost Town" | 4 | 11 | KOR: 147,530; JPN: 10,325 |
| Incense | Released: January 4, 2023; Label: Fantagio; Formats: CD, digital download, streaming; Track listing: 1. "Perfumer"; 2. "Madness"; 3. "Desire" (이끌려); 4. "Wish" (바람); 5. "Chup Chup"; 6. "Your Day" | 5 | 2 | KOR: 143,582; JPN: 14,081 |

=== Singles ===
| Title | Year | Peak chart position | Album |
| Title | Year | KOR | Album |
|---|---|---|---|
| "Bad Idea" | 2020 | 191 | In-Out |
| "Ghost Town" | 2022 | — (Note: "Ghost Town" did not enter the Gaon Digital Chart, but appeared at number 73 on the component Download Chart.) | Refuge |
| "Who" | 2022 | 29 | Refuge |
| "Madness" | 2023 | 90 | Incense |
"—" denotes a recording that did not chart or was not released in that territory

=== Other charted songs ===
| Title | Year | Peak chart position | Album |
| Title | Year | KOR | Album |
|---|---|---|---|
| "Perfumer" | 2023 | — (Note: "Perfumer" did not enter the Circle Digital Chart, but peaked at number 14 on the component Download Chart.) | Incense |
| "Desire" (이끌려) | 2023 | — (Note: "이끌려" did not enter the Circle Digital Chart, but peaked at number 15 on the component Download Chart.) | Incense |
| "Wish" (바람) | 2023 | — (Note: "Wind" (바람) did not enter the Circle Digital Chart, but peaked at number 17 on the component Download Chart.) | Incense |
| "Chup Chup" | 2023 | — (Note: "Chup Chup" did not enter the Circle Digital Chart, but peaked at number 13 on the component Download Chart.) | Incense |
| "Your Day" | 2023 | — (Note: "Your Day" did not enter the Circle Digital Chart, but peaked at number 19 on the component Download Chart.) | Incense |
"—" denotes a recording that did not chart or was not released in that territory

== Fan-con tours ==
- DIFFUSION (2023)
