= Choi Yoo-jung (singer) =

South Korean singer and actress (born 1999)

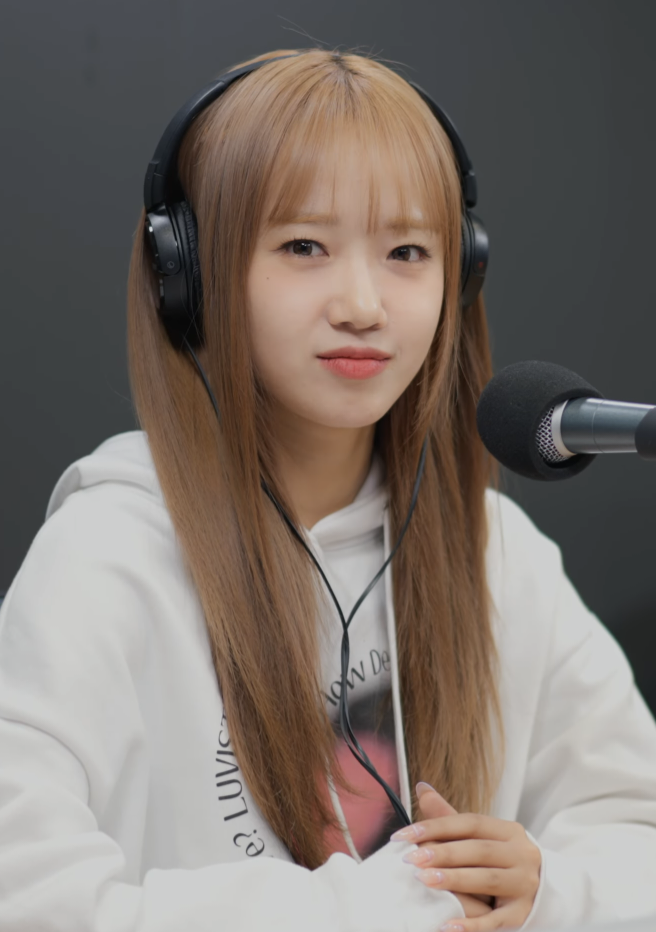
- Choi in October 2022
- Born: November 12, 1999 (age 26); Guri, South Korea
- Education: School of Performing Arts Seoul
- Occupations: Singer; actress
- Musical career
- Genres: K-pop
- Instrument: Vocals
- Years active: 2016–present
- Labels: Fantagio; YMC (Note: As a member of I.O.I only.); Swing; Studio Blu
- Formerly of: I.O.I; I.O.I sub-unit; WJMK; Weki Meki

Korean name
- Hangul: 최유정
- Hanja: 磪有情
- RR: Choe Yujeong
- MR: Ch'oe Yujŏng

Choi Yoo-jung (Korean: 최유정; born November 12, 1999), known mononymously as Yoojung, is a South Korean singer and actress signed under Fantagio. She debuted as a member of I.O.I in May 2016 after achieving third place in the 2016 survival program Produce 101. In January 2017, I.O.I officially disbanded after eleven months of promotion. I.O.I briefly returned for a 10 year comeback in 2026. Following disbandment, she returned to her respective agency and eventually debuted with Weki Meki in August 2017. Choi debuted as a solo artist with the single album Sunflower in September 2022.

== Early life and education ==
Choi Yoo-jung was born in Guri, South Korea on November 12, 1999 as an only child. When she was younger, she wanted to become either a teacher or police officer but started to take an interest in performing. She joined Fantagio and trained for four years and seven months under the company before joining Mnet's girl group survival show Produce 101 in 2016 wherein she ended up debuting as a member of I.O.I. She attended Guri Girls' High School but eventually transferred to School of Performing Arts Seoul along with fellow I.O.I and Weki Meki member Kim Do-yeon after debuting due to their promotional activities.

== Career ==
=== 2016: Produce 101 and I.O.I ===
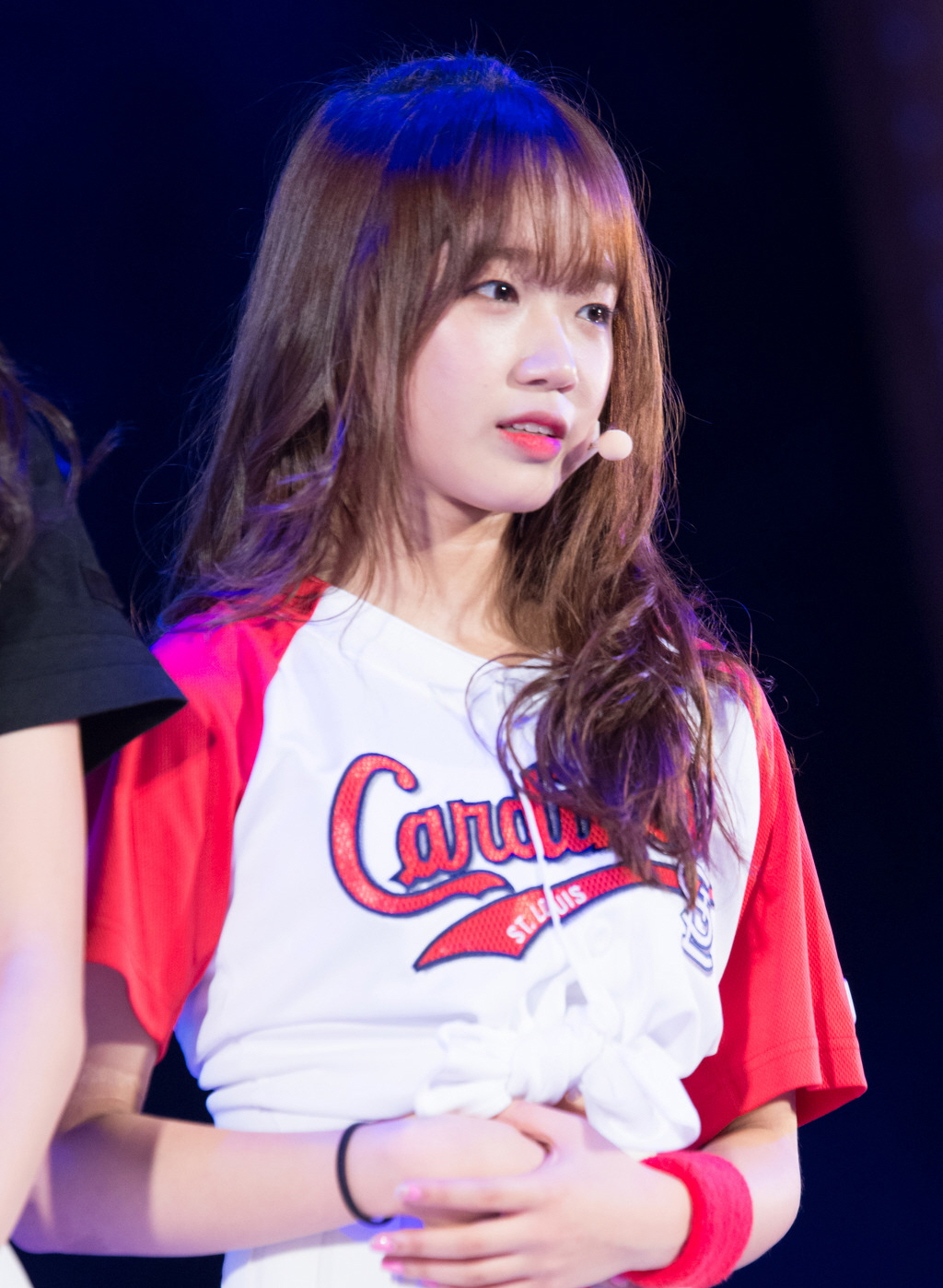
Choi at Lotte World Festival in April 2016

In January 2016, Choi joined Produce 101 along with Kim Do-yeon and three other Fantagio trainees with the hopes of debuting in an eleven-member girl group which would promote for a year under YMC Entertainment. Choi initially gained popularity for being chosen by vote as the center for the show's theme song "Pick Me", which had its music video premiere a month before the first show aired on the December 17, 2015 episode of M Countdown. Both Choi and Kim rose to high ranks during the program and eventually placed 3rd and 8th respectively in the show's finale on April 1, 2016, which allowed them to debut as members of I.O.I. On May 4, 2016, I.O.I released their debut single "Dream Girls" which had its rap parts penned by Choi and Im Na-young. Both members also wrote the lyrics for the EP's intro track "I.O.I". The group also promoted as a seven-member unit which Choi was also a part of with Kim, releasing the single "Whatta Man" on August 9, 2016. As part of I.O.I, Choi also released an OST with the unit and also collaborated with fellow members Chungha, Jeon Somi and fellow Produce 101 contestant Ki Hui-hyeon for the digital single "Flower, Wind and You". The song charted at number 42 on the Gaon Digital Chart. She also appeared in the music video of her label-mate ASTRO's song "Breathless" which was released on July 1, 2016. In November 2016, Choi joined the cast of Mnet's music variety show Golden Tambourine. She then released the single "Rise and Fall" together with Yoo Se-yoon, Shim Hyung-tak and Jo Kwon as part of the show's official soundtrack.

=== 2017–2019: Debut with Weki Meki and WJMK ===
After I.O.I parted ways on January 29, 2017, and ended their contract with YMC Entertainment, Choi and Kim Do-yeon filmed a reality show in the United States titled Dodaeng's Diary in LA which aired on TVING. Months later, Fantagio announced their plans to debut a new girl group, which they later revealed would be called Weki Meki. Both Choi and Kim made their official debut with the group on August 8, 2017, with the release of the single "I Don't Like Your Girlfriend" and the six-track EP Weme which had some of its lyrics written by Choi.

On May 2, 2018, Starship Entertainment and Fantagio revealed their plans to form a special four-member unit with members of their respective girl groups Cosmic Girls and Weki Meki, which they eventually revealed will be called WJMK. Weki Meki's Choi and Kim and Cosmic Girls' Seola and Luda released the single "Strong" on June 1, 2018, along with its accompanying music video. On August 8, she joined the JTBC reality program Secret Unnie with EXID's Hani.

Choi was part of My Mad Beauty 3 alongside Park Na-rae, Mijoo and Han Hye-jin. She was also part of the variety show The Gashinas. In September 2019, Choi participated in the survival program show, V-1, to select the Vocal Queen among the various girl group members, where only the top twelve girl group members in votes would progress and perform on the show. However, she was eliminated in the first episode, after losing out to bandmate Suyeon.

=== 2020–present: Acting career and solo debut ===
In 2020, Choi starred in the web drama Cast: The Golden Age of Insiders. Later that year, she starred in the web drama Single and Ready to Mingle alongside Kim Doyeon. On May 4, 2021, Choi and the members of I.O.I celebrated their fifth debut anniversary with a reunion live stream show titled "Yes, I Love It!". On September 17, Choi featured on Dotoli's "With a Summer Night". On October 11, Choi featured on Raiden's song "It Wasn't Me" from his debut extended play Love Right Back.

On January 17, 2022, Choi featured on Jinjin's "Lazy" from Jinjin & Rocky's debut EP Restore. On August 13, Choi released the digital single "Uh-ra?" along with rapper Ahn Byung-woong. On August 23, it was reported that Choi would make her solo debut in September. On August 26, it was confirmed that her debut single album Sunflower would be released on September 14, 2022.

On July 10, 2023, Choi starred in the web drama Sound Candy alongside Kim Jong-hyeon. On August 17, Choi starred her first solo web show Yoodaeng's Work Work. Later that year, she was part of the web show Blossom with Love. In November 2023, Choi would cast in her film debut The Noisy Mansion, where she played the role as Saet-byeol. The full-scale filming will begin in December.

In April 2024, Choi starred in a KBS1 series A Bicycle Runs on Two Wheels as part of the short promotional video for Movement to Put People with Disabilities First, which premiered on April 19. On August 16, 2024, Fantagio announced that Weki Meki had effectively disbanded on August 8 after five members left the agency. However, Choi was still in discussions of renewing her contract with the agency. On November 18, Fantagio announced that Choi had renewed her exclusive contract with the agency. On the same day, Choi was selected as a special DJ for KBS Cool FM radio show Volume Up.

== Discography ==
=== Single albums ===
List of single albums, with selected chart positions and sales
Title	Details	Peak chart position	Sales
Title	Details	KOR	Sales
Sunflower	Released: September 14, 2022; Label: Fantagio; Formats: CD, digital download, streaming	14	KOR: 13,700
Perfect Target	Released: June 30, 2026; Label: Fantagio; Formats: CD, digital download, streaming	18	KOR: 11,951

=== Singles ===
Title	Year	Peak chart position	Sales	Album
Title	Year	KOR	Sales	Album
As lead artist
"Sunflower (P.E.L)"	2022	— (Note: "Sunflower (P.E.L)" did not enter the Circle Digital Chart, but debuted and peaked at number 33 on the component Download Chart.)	—N/a	Sunflower
"Perfect Target"	2026	—	—N/a	Perfect Target
Collaborations
"Flower, Wind and You" (꽃, 바람 그리고 너) (with Ki Hui-hyeon, Jeon Somi and Chungha)	2016	42	KOR: 38,862+	Non-album singles
"UH-RA?" (어라?) (with Ahn Byeong-woong)	2022	—	—N/a	Non-album singles
As featured artist
"With a Summer Night" (여름밤과 함께였지) (DOTOLI featuring Yoojung)	2021	—	—N/a	Non-album single
"It Wasn't Me" (Raiden featuring Yoojung)	2021	—	—N/a	Love Right Back
"Lazy" (Jinjin featuring Yoojung)	2022	— (Note: "Lazy" did not enter the Gaon Digital Chart, but debuted and peaked at position 189 on the component Download Chart.)	—N/a	Restore
"Ssook Ddoong" (쑥맥) (Bookku Ddoong featuring Yoojung)	2022	— (Note: "Ssook Ddoong" did not enter the Gaon Digital Chart, but debuted and peaked at position 52 on the component Download Chart.)	—N/a	Non-album single
Promotional singles
"Rise and Fall" (흥망성쇠) (with Yoo Se-yoon, Shim Hyung-tak and Jo Kwon)	2017	—	—N/a	Golden Tambourine
Soundtrack appearances
"Again and Again" (자꾸만) (Note: Credited as a song by Weki Meki, but sung by Yoojung and Doyeon.)	2021	—	—N/a	Single & Ready to Mingle OST Part 1
"Break It Down"	2023	—	—N/a	Cold Blooded Intern OST Part 1
"I hope"	2024	—	—N/a	Dare to Love Me OST Part 2
"—" denotes releases that did not chart or were not released in that region.

=== Songwriting credits ===
All song credits are adapted from the Korea Music Copyright Association's database, unless otherwise noted.

List of songs, showing year released, artist name, and name of the album
Title	Year	Album	Artist	With
"I.O.I" (intro)	2016	Chrysalis	I.O.I	Lim Na-young
"Dream Girls"	2016	Chrysalis	I.O.I	Famousbro, Lim Na-young
"More More"	2016	Miss Me?	I.O.I	Lim Na-young, Rhymer
"Stay with Me"	2017	Weme	Weki Meki	Seo Jieum, Zaydro, Hwang Jaewoong, RHeaT
"Pretty Boy (iTeen Girls Special)"	2017	Weme	Weki Meki	Song Sooyun, Lee Hyungsuk, Han Jaeho, Kim Seungsoo
"Crush"	2018	Kiss, Kicks	Weki Meki	TENTEN
"True Valentine"	2018	Kiss, Kicks	Weki Meki	JQ, Song Jia
"Whatever U Want"	2019	Lock End LOL	Weki Meki	Chakun
"Just Us"	2020	New Rules	Weki Meki	Ji Su-yeon, Lucy
"Sunflower (P.E.L)"	2022	Sunflower	Herself	Ellie Suh (153/Joombas)
"Tip Tip Toes"	2022	Sunflower	Herself	Jo Yoon-kyung
"Perfect Target"	2026	Perfect Target	Herself	BuildingOwner
"Still Cute?"	2026	Perfect Target	Herself	BuildingOwner, Shorelle

== Videography ==
=== Music videos ===
Title	Year	Director(s)	Ref.
"Sunflower (P.E.L)"	2022	Lee Kwang-Bok (STUDIO SAPIENS)	
"Perfect Target"	2026	Sehee Kim	

== Filmography ==
=== Film ===
Year	Title	Role	Ref.
2025	The Noisy Mansion	Saet-byeol	

=== Television series ===
Year	Title	Role	Notes	Ref.
2019	Be Melodramatic	Choi Yoo-jung	Cameo (episode 3)	
2024	A Bicycle Runs on Two Wheels	Eun-ae	One act-drama	

=== Web series ===
Year	Title	Role	Notes	Ref.
2015	To Be Continued	Student	Cameo	
2017	Idol Fever	Yoojung		
2020	Cast: The Golden Age of Insiders	Lim Yoo-kyung		
2020	Single and Ready to Mingle	Bong Joo-yi		
2023	Sound Candy	Go Chae-rin		

=== Television shows ===
Year	Title	Role	Notes	Ref.
2016	Produce 101	Contestant	Survival show that determined I.O.I members Finished 3rd	
2016–2017	Golden Tambourine	Host		
2017	Dodaeng's Diary in LA	Cast member	with Doyeon	
2018	Secret Unnie	Cast member	with Hani	
2019	My Mad Beauty 3	Host		
2019	The Gashinas	Cast member		
2019	V-1	Contestant		
2020	My Dream Is Ryan	Student teacher		
2021	Spicy Girls	Cast Member		
2021	Off the Record	Host	with Lee Juck and Kim Sook	
2021	Rule the Next 2021	Host		
2022	Master Vs Master	Cast Member		
2022–2023	Korea After School: Field Trip	Host	Season 1	

=== Web shows ===
Year	Title	Role	Ref.
2023	Yoodaeng's Work Work	Host	
2023	Blossom with Love	Panelist	

=== Radio shows ===
Year	Title	Role	Notes	Ref.
2024	Volume Up	Special DJ	November 18–24	

== Theater ==
Year	Title	Role	Ref.
2024	Hero	Lingling	
2025	Broadway 42nd Street	Peggy Sawyer	
