= Lock End LOL =

2019 K-pop album by Weki Meki

Single album by Weki Meki
- Released: May 14, 2019
- Genre: Dance-pop; funk; ballad
- Length: 10:50
- Language: Korean; English
- Label: Fantagio Music; Interpark

Weki Meki chronology
Kiss, Kicks (2018)	Lock End LOL (2019)	Hide and Seek (2020)

Music videos
- "Picky Picky" on YouTube
- "Tiki-Taka (99%)" on YouTube

Lock End LOL (stylized as LOCK END LOL) is the second and final single album by South Korean girl group Weki Meki. It was released by Fantagio Music and distributed by Interpark on May 14, 2019. It consists of three songs, including the lead single, "Picky Picky".

The single album was later re-released as Week End LOL on August 8, 2019, with "Tiki-Taka (99%)" as lead single.

== Release ==
Lock End LOL was released as a digital download on May 14, 2019, through several music portals, including MelOn and iTunes. It was also released as a CD single on May 17.

== Chart performance ==
=== Lock End LOL ===
The single album debuted at number 6 on the Gaon Album Chart for the week ending May 18. In its second week, the single fell to number 40. In its third week, the single rose to number 18 and fell to number 27 in its fourth week.

The album placed at number 24 for the month of May with 12,373 physical copies sold. It also placed at number 56 for the month of June with 3,254 additional copies sold. It has sold 20,051 copies as of July 2019.

=== Week End LOL ===
The reissue debuted at number 7 on the Gaon Album Chart for the week ending August 17. In its second week, the reissue fell to number to number 25, and in a third week to number 32. The album placed at number 26 for the month of August with 9,149 physical copies sold.

== Track listing ==
Digital download / CD
No.	Title	Lyrics	Music	Arrangement	Length
1.	"Picky Picky"	Chakun	Leonalion; Karl "KP" Powell (The Colleagues); Chakun; Otha "Vakseen" Davis III; G.Bliz	The Colleagues; Leonalion; Grvvity; G.Bliz	3:16
2.	"Whatever U Want" (너 하고 싶은 거 다 해 (너.하.다))	Chakun; Choi Yoo-jung	Albin Nordqvist; Malin Johansson; Brad.K; Chakun	Albin Nordqvist	3:57
3.	"Petal Fortune" (좋아한다 안 한다 (꽃잎점))	Chungyoon; Moon Kim	Moon Kim; Kyum Lyk; Chungyoon	Chungyoon; Kyum Lyk; Moon Kim	3:37
Total length:					10:50

Week End LOL reissue track listing
No.	Title	Lyrics	Music	Arrangement	Length
1.	"Tiki-Taka (99%)"	JQ; Amelie; Kim Yeon-seo; MinGtion	Andrew Choi; Kim Yeon-seo; MinGtion	MinGtion	2:59
2.	"Picky Picky"	Chakun	Leonalion; Karl "KP" Powell (The Colleagues); Chakun; Otha "Vakseen" Davis III; G.Bliz	The Colleagues; Leonalion; Grvvity; G.Bliz	3:16
3.	"Whatever U Want" (너 하고 싶은 거 다 해 (너.하.다))	Chakun; Choi Yoo-jung	Albin Nordqvist; Malin Johansson; Brad.K; Chakun	Albin Nordqvist	3:57
4.	"Petal Fortune" (좋아한다 안 한다 (꽃잎점))	Chungyoon; Moon Kim	Moon Kim; Kyum Lyk; Chungyoon	Chungyoon; Kyum Lyk; Moon Kim	3:37
Total length:					13:49

== Charts ==
Chart (2019)	Peak position
South Korean Albums (Gaon)	6

== Release history ==
Region	Date	Format	Labels
Various	May 14, 2019	Digital download, streaming	Fantagio Music, Interpark
South Korea	May 17, 2019	CD	Fantagio Music, Interpark
