= Moonbin =

South Korean singer and actor (1998–2023)

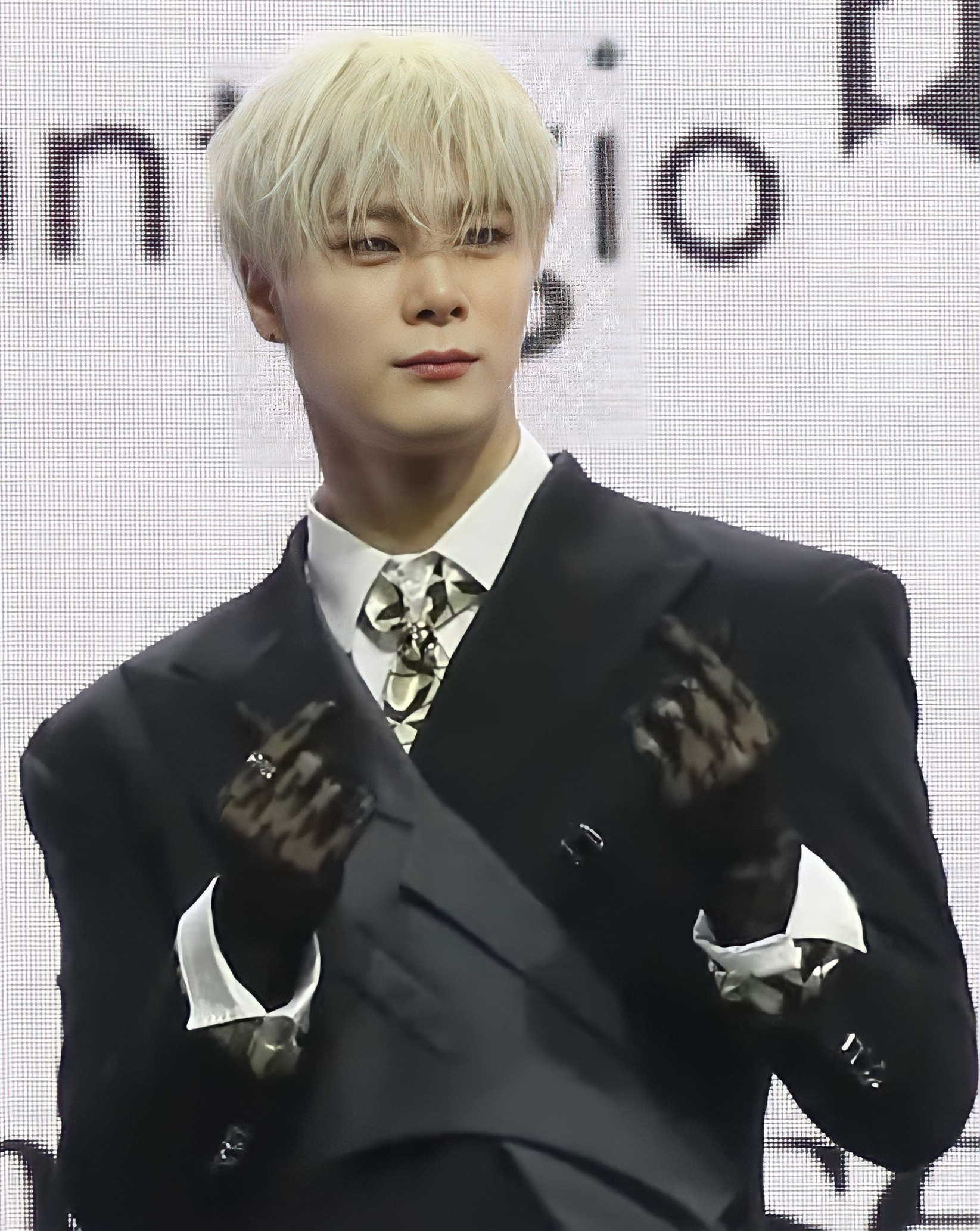
- Moonbin in 2023
- Born: Moon Bin; January 26, 1998; Cheongju, South Korea
- Died: April 19, 2023 (aged 25); Seoul, South Korea
- Education: Hanlim Multi Art School
- Occupations: Singer; actor; dancer
- Relatives: Moon Sua (sister)
- Musical career
- Genre: K-pop
- Instrument: Vocals
- Years active: 2009–2023
- Label: Fantagio
- Formerly of: Astro; Moonbin & Sanha

Korean name
- Hangul: 문빈
- Hanja: 文彬
- RR: Mun Bin
- MR: Mun Pin

Moon Bin (Korean: 문빈; January 26, 1998 – April 19, 2023), also known professionally as Moonbin, was a South Korean singer, actor, and dancer under the label Fantagio. He was a member of the South Korean boy group Astro and its sub-unit Moonbin & Sanha.

== Early life ==
Moonbin was born on January 26, 1998, in Cheongju, Chungbuk Province. He attended and graduated from Hanlim Multi Art School, focusing in Practical Music.

He was one of two siblings in his family, with a younger sister named Moon Sua, who is a member of the South Korean girl group Billlie.

== Career ==
=== 2006–2015: Pre-debut ===
Under the influence of his mother, Moonbin debuted as a child model and ulzzang in 2004. His first known appearance was in 2006, where he appeared in TVXQ's music video for their song "Balloons" portraying a mini U-Know Yunho. In 2009, he had his first acting role in the Korean drama Boys over Flowers where he played the younger version of Kim Bum's character.

Moonbin began his journey with Fantagio as a trainee in fifth grade, eventually transitioning to a full-fledged trainee during his middle school years. He actively took part in the company's boy group project iTeen, and he was introduced through the Fantagio iTeen Photo Test Cut. Before his official debut with Astro, Moonbin and his fellow group members starred in a web-drama titled "To Be Continued".

=== 2016–2022: Debut with Astro, solo activities, and unit debut ===
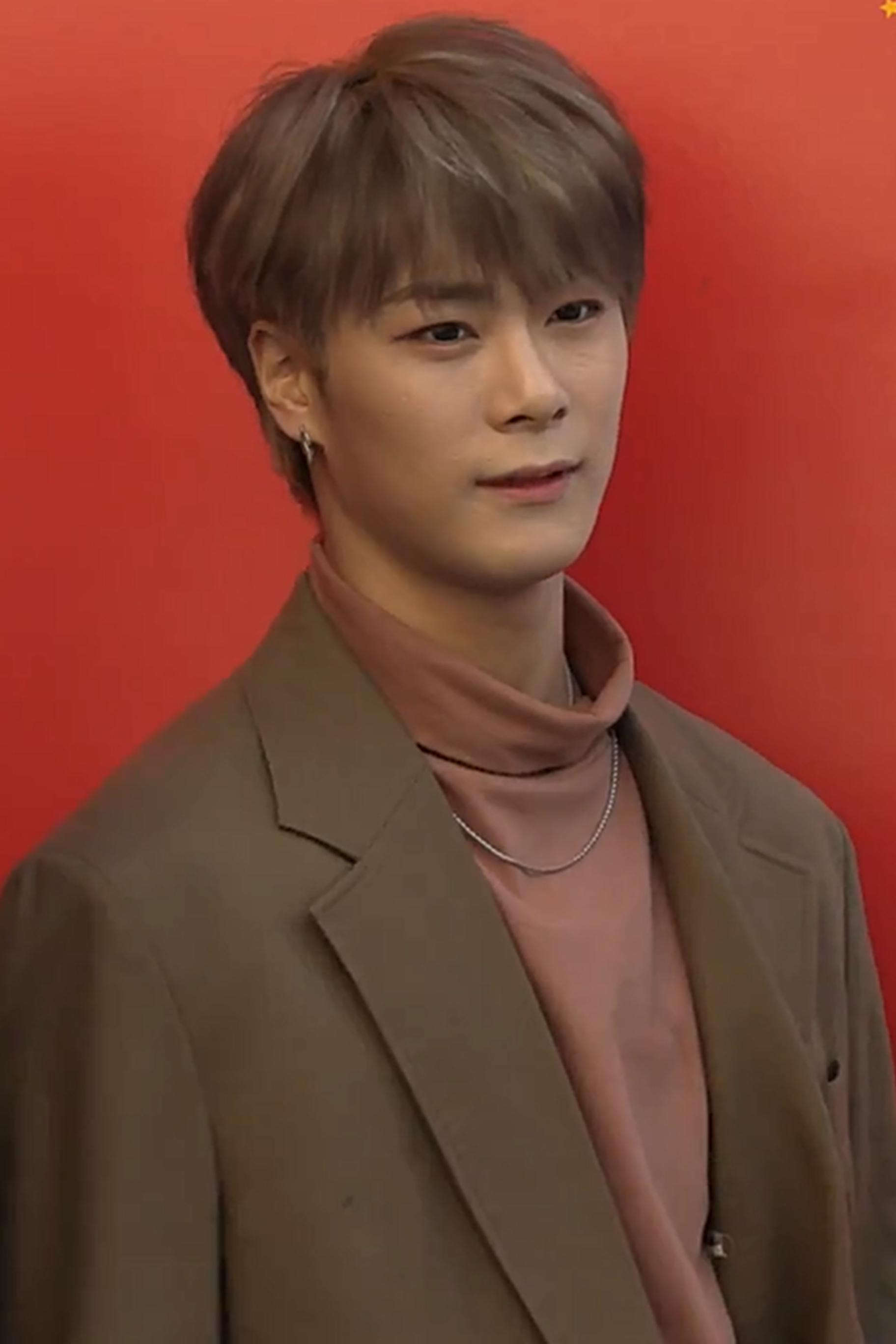
Moonbin during the 2019 S/S Hera Seoul Fashion Week on October 19, 2018

Moonbin debuted as part of the six-member boy group Astro on February 23, 2016. Their debut extended play, Spring Up, contained five songs, including the lead single "Hide & Seek". In 2018, Moonbin joined the cast of The Ultimate Watchlist of Latest Trends, participating in the first two seasons. The following year, he was cast in Moments of Eighteen, where he played the character of Jung Oh-je.

On November 12, 2019, Fantagio reported that for health reasons, Moonbin would be absent from Astro's upcoming promotions for their Blue Flame EP release. He ended his hiatus in February 2020 after appearing in a V Live broadcast with the other Astro members. He was announced as one of the new hosts of the South Korean music show Show Champion, alongside his bandmate Yoon San-ha and Verivery's Kangmin. He was confirmed to play the lead role in the web-drama The Mermaid Prince, a role which he reprised for a second season, and joined the eco-friendly cooking program Food Avengers.

In September 2020, Moonbin was announced as one of the fashion models for the brand Nerdy Cafe. He and band-mate Sanha (Yoon San-ha) debuted as Astro's first sub-unit Moonbin & Sanha with the release of their debut EP, In-Out, along with its lead single, "Bad Idea", on September 14. The unit received their first music show win from The Show eight days later.

Later that year, Moonbin was added as a cast member for the second season of Coupang Play's Saturday Night Live Korea. On December 30, 2022, Fantagio released an official statement confirming that Moonbin had decided to renew his contract with the agency.

== Death ==
On the evening of April 19, 2023, Moonbin was found dead at his home in the Gangnam District of Seoul at the age of 25. He was found by his manager after he failed to attend rehearsals. Yonhap News shared a statement released by the Seoul Gangnam Police who were investigating his death and described it as a suspected suicide, but were "discussing the possibility of an autopsy to determine the precise cause of death". On April 20, Gangnam Police told CNN that "no signs of foul play have been found related to this case."

According to an official statement released by Fantagio on April 21, Moonbin was to be buried on April 22, 2023. The funeral procession and the burial site was kept private per the request of his family.

== Discography ==
Title	Year	Peak chart positions	Album
Title	Year	KOR Down.	Album
As lead artist
"Let's Go Ride"	2022	59	Drive to the Starry Road
"Desire" (이끌려)	2023	15	Incense
"Fly" (with Jinjin)	2024	90	Non-album single
Collaborations
"Language Test" (with Weki Meki Ji Su-yeon)	2018	—	FM201.8

=== Songwriting credits ===
All credits are listed under the Korea Music Copyright Association unless otherwise stated.

Year	Title	Artist	Album	Lyricist	Composer
2017	"You & Me (Thanks Aroha)"	Astro	Winter Dream	Yes	No
2018	"By Your Side" (너의 뒤에서)	Astro	Rise Up	Yes	No
2018	"Merry-Go-Round (Christmas Edition)"	Astro	Non-album single	Yes	No
2019	"Merry-Go-Round"	Astro	All Light	Yes	No
2021	"Footprint" (발자국)	Astro	Switch On	Yes	No
2022	"Candy Sugar Pop"	Astro	Drive to the Starry Road	Yes	No
2023	"Madness"	Moonbin & Sanha	Incense	Yes	No
2023	"Desire" (이끌려)	Himself	Incense	Yes	Yes

== Filmography ==
=== Television series ===
Year	Title	Role	Ref.
2009	Boys Over Flowers	So Yi-jung (young)	
2019	At Eighteen	Jung Oh-je	

=== Web series ===
Year	Title	Role	Notes	Ref.
2015	To be Continued	Himself		
2017	Idol Fever		Cameo	
2019	Soul Plate	Angel Muriel		
2020	The Mermaid Prince	Woo Hyuk	Lifetime Korea	
2020	The Mermaid Prince: The Beginning	Choi Woo-hyuk	Lifetime Korea	
2021	No Going Back Romance		Cameo	
2021	Find Me If You Can		Cameo; episode 6	

=== Television shows ===
Year	Title	Role	Notes	Ref.
2018–2019	The Ultimate Watchlist of Latest Trend	Cast member	Season 1–2	
2020	Food Avengers	Cast member		
2020–2022	Show Champion	Host	with Yoon San-ha and Kangmin	

=== Web shows ===
Year	Title	Role	Notes	Ref.
2021	Insa Oppa	Cast		
2021–2022	Saturday Night Live Korea	Cast member	Season 2	
2022	Challenge	Host	TikTok Stage on Air; with Yoon San-ha	

== Awards and nominations ==
Name of the award ceremony, year presented, category, nominee of the award, and the result of the nomination
Award ceremony	Year	Category	Nominee / Work	Result	Ref.
APAN Music Awards	2020	Entertainer of the Year – Male Award	Moonbin	Nominated	
Brand Customer Loyalty Awards (Note: Co-organized by the Korean Customers Council and Brand Keys, this event recognizes the most influential brands in society and culture, as determined through consumer research.)	2020	Male Actor Idol of the Year Award	The Mermaid Prince	Nominated	
Korea First Brand Awards	2021	Best Idol Unit Award (with Yoon San-ha)	Moonbin & Sanha	Nominated	
Seoul Webfest Film Festival	2022	Best Supporting Actor Award	Find Me If You Can	Nominated	
