= Weme, Minnesota =

Unincorporated community in Minnesota, United States

Weme
- Unincorporated community
- Location within Minnesota Location within the United States
- Coordinates: 47°38′39″N 95°32′17″W
- Country: United States
- State: Minnesota
- County: Clearwater
- Elevation: 1,329 ft (405 m)
- Time zone: UTC-6 (Central (CST))
  - Summer (DST): UTC-5 (CDT)
- Area code: 218
- GNIS feature ID: 655001

Weme is an unincorporated community in Clearwater County, in the U.S. state of Minnesota.

== History ==
A post office was established at Weme in 1902, and remained in operation until it was discontinued in 1912. Hans Weme, the first postmaster, gave the community its name.
