= Chu Ye-jin =

South Korean actress (born 2001)

- Born: October 11, 2001 (age 25); Bucheon, South Korea
- Occupation: Actress
- Years active: 2012–present
- Agent: Fantagio

Korean name
- Hangul: 추예진
- RR: Chu Yejin
- MR: Ch'u Yejin

Chu Ye-jin (Korean: 추예진; born October 11, 2001) is a South Korean actress. She was a contestant on Mnet's girl group survival program Produce 101.

== Filmography ==
=== Film ===
Year	Title	Role	Note	Ref.
2012	A Day Worth Dying For	Hyemi	short	
2013	My Dear Girl, Jin-young	Middle school student Kim Ja-young		
2014	Dad for Rent	Bad girl 1		
2020	Boys Be!	Yeon-jeong		
2024	Spring Garden	Hyun Ju		

=== Television series ===
Year	Title	Role	Note	Ref.
2012	Just Like Today	Young Yoon In-sook		
2012	Golden Time	Young Kang Jae-in		
2013	7th Grade Civil Servant	young Kim Seo-won		
2013	The Queen's Classroom	Han Sun-young		
2013	A Little Love Never Hurts	Jang Seo-young		
2014	The Three Musketeers	Tan-yi		
2015	Divorce Lawyer in Love	young Go Mi-hee		
2018	A Pledge to God	Na Hye-ji		
2019	He Is Psychometric	young Eun Ji-soo		
2020	When the Weather Is Fine	Kwon Hyun-ji		
2020	Tale of the Nine Tailed	Jung Soo-young	Cameo (Episode 1)	
2021	Revolutionary Sisters	Na Pyun-seung's girlfriend	Cameo	
2024	Nothing Uncovered	young Mo Soo-rin		

=== Web series ===
Year	Title	Role	Notes	Ref.
2015	To Be Continued	Herself		
2017	Sweet Revenge	Na Ban-jang		
2021	Would You Like a Cup of Coffee?	Jung Ga-won		
2025	Friendly Rivalry	Yoo Je-na	ep 8 and ongoing	

=== Television shows ===
Year	Title	Role	Network	Note
2014	The Kim's Show	herself	Tooniverse	Cast
2016	Produce 101	herself	Mnet	Contestant representing Fantagio; Eliminated in Episode 8
