= Weme (EP) =

EP by Weki Meki
- Released: August 8, 2017
- Genre: Hip hop; R&B; Nu-disco; tropical house
- Label: Fantagio Music; Interpark
- Producer: Im Kwanguk; Ryan Kim; Chase; Amanda Moseley; Zaydro; Hwang Jaewoong; RHeaT; Han Jaeho; Kim Seungsoo; Lee Hyungsuk; Glory Face; Jake K; Jinli; East4A; David Park

Weki Meki chronology
Weme (2017)	Lucky (2018)

Alternative covers
- CD B version

Singles from Weme
- 1. "I Don't Like Your Girlfriend" Released: August 8, 2017

Weme (위미 "we-me") is the debut extended play by South Korean girl group Weki Meki. It was released on August 8, 2017, by Fantagio Music and distributed by Interpark. The EP consists of six songs, including the title track "I Don't Like Your Girlfriend".

The EP peaked at number 7 on the Gaon Album Chart. It has sold over 47,000 physical copies, making it the highest selling album by a girl group that debuted in 2017.

== Background and release ==
On August 3, 2017, a highlight medley of the album was released. On August 6, a video teaser was released, showing the group transforming from white outfits to colorful ones. The video also showed each member's name.

The EP was released through several music portals, including MelOn in South Korea, and iTunes globally. On September 12, a limited "B Version" of the album was released physically in South Korea.

== Promotion ==
=== Single ===
"I Don't Like Your Girlfriend" was released as the title track in conjunction with the EP on August 8. On August 1, the first music video teaser was released. On August 4, the second and final music video teaser was released. The full music video was released on August 8 through the group's official YouTube channel. The song debuted and peaked at number 95 on the Gaon Digital Chart, on the chart issue dated August 6–12, 2017, with 21,447 downloads sold.

== Commercial performance ==
WEME debuted at number 7 on the Gaon Album Chart, on the chart issue dated August 6–12, 2017. In its second week, the EP continued at number 7 and after a week off the chart, the EP re-entered at number 13 in its fourth week.

The EP also placed at number 14 on the album chart for the month of August 2017, with 28,087 physical copies sold. Also with the release of the B version packaging, the EP placed at number 16 on the album chart for the month of September 2017, with 12,017 physical copies sold. This brought the total amount sold in the first two months to 40,104 physical copies. In its third month of release the EP sold 6,968 physical copies, bringing its total to 47,072.

According to Gaon, the EP sold 47,000 copies since its release, marking the highest selling album by a girl group that debuted in 2017.

== Track listing ==
Digital download
No.	Title	Lyrics	Music	Arrangement	Length
1.	"I Don't Like Your Girlfriend"	Seo Ji-eum	Im Kwang-uk; Ryan Kim; Chase; Amanda Moseley	Devine Channel	3:19
2.	"Stay with Me"	Seo Jieum; Zaydro; Hwang Jaewoong; RHeaT; Choi Yoo-jung	Zaydro; Hwang Jae-woong; RHeaT	Zaydro; RHeaT	3:35
3.	"Pretty Boy (iTeen Girls Special)" (너란 사람; Neolan Salam)	Song Soo-yun; Lee Hyung-suk; Han Jae-ho; Kim Seung-soo; Choi Yoo-jung	Han Jae-ho; Kim Seung-soo; Lee Hyung-suk	Lee Hyung-suk; Hong Seung-hyun	3:21
4.	"Neverland"	Jinli (Full8loom); GloryFace (Full8loom)	Glory Face (Full8loom); Jake K (Full8loom); Jinli (Full8loom)	Glory Face (Full8loom); Jake K (Full8loom)	3:31
5.	"My World"	Jinli (Full8loom)	Glory Face (Full8loom)	Glory Face (Full8loom); Jinli (Full8loom)	3:29
6.	"Fantastic"	East4A; David Park	East4A; David Park	East4A; David Park	3:43
Total length:					20:58

== Charts ==
Chart (2017)	Peak position
South Korean Albums (Gaon)	7
