= Weki Meki =

South Korean girl group (2017–2024)

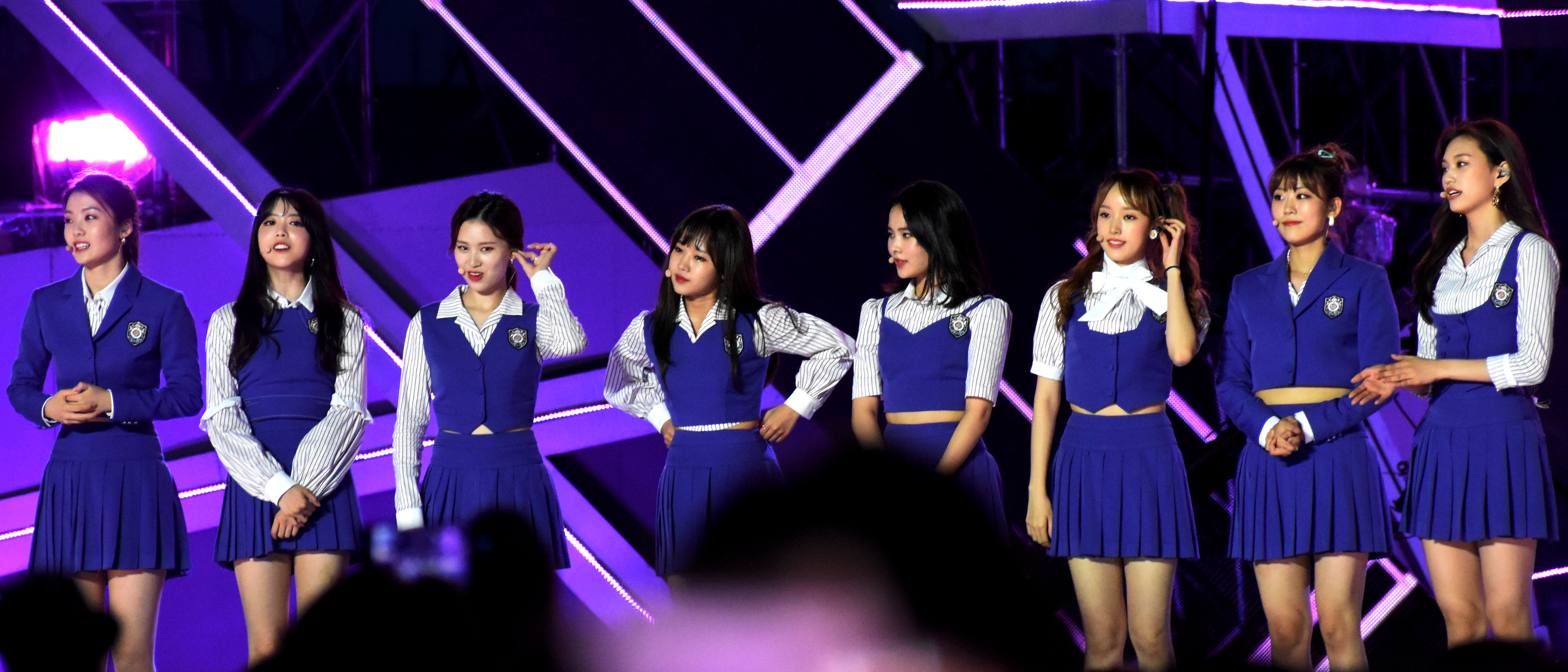
- Weki Meki in September 2018; L-R: Lucy, Suyeon, Elly, Yoojung, Rina, Sei, Lua, Doyeon

Background information
- Origin: Seoul, South Korea
- Genres: K-pop; moombahton; Funk; R&B; pop rap
- Years active: 2017–2024
- Label: Fantagio
- Past members: Suyeon; Elly; Yoojung; Doyeon; Sei; Lua; Rina; Lucy
- Website: fantagio.kr/musicians/위키미키/

Weki Meki (Korean: 위키미키; abbreviated as WEME or WKMK) was a South Korean girl group formed by Fantagio in 2017. The group consisted of eight members: Suyeon, Elly, Yoojung, Doyeon, Sei, Lua, Rina, and Lucy. During the group's career, they released five EPs, two single albums and one re-issue single album. The group finished their seven year career with the release of their final single "CoinciDestiny" on June 12, 2024. On August 16, 2024, it was announced the group had officially disbanded.

== History ==
The official logo of Weki Meki

=== Pre-debut ===
The members started out as trainees under Fantagio i-Teen, a rookie talent development program under Fantagio Entertainment, and were known as i-Teen Girls.

In 2015, i-Teen Girls members Kim Do-yeon, Choi Yoo-jung, Lua, Lucy and Elly (as well as former trainees Chu Ye-jin and Lee Soo-min) had numerous cameos in label mates Astro's predebut online web drama To Be Continued.

Elly (as Jung Hae-rim), Choi Yoo-jung, Kim Do-yeon, and Sei (as Lee Seo-jeong, then under LOUDers Entertainment) competed in the Mnet survival television program Produce 101, which aired from January 22 to April 1, 2016. Choi Yoo-jung and Kim Do-yeon were ranked in the final top 11 contestants and debuted in the project girl group I.O.I.

On July 6, 2017, Fantagio revealed that their new girl group would be called Weki Meki.

=== 2017–2018: Debut with Weme, Lucky, and Kiss, Kicks ===
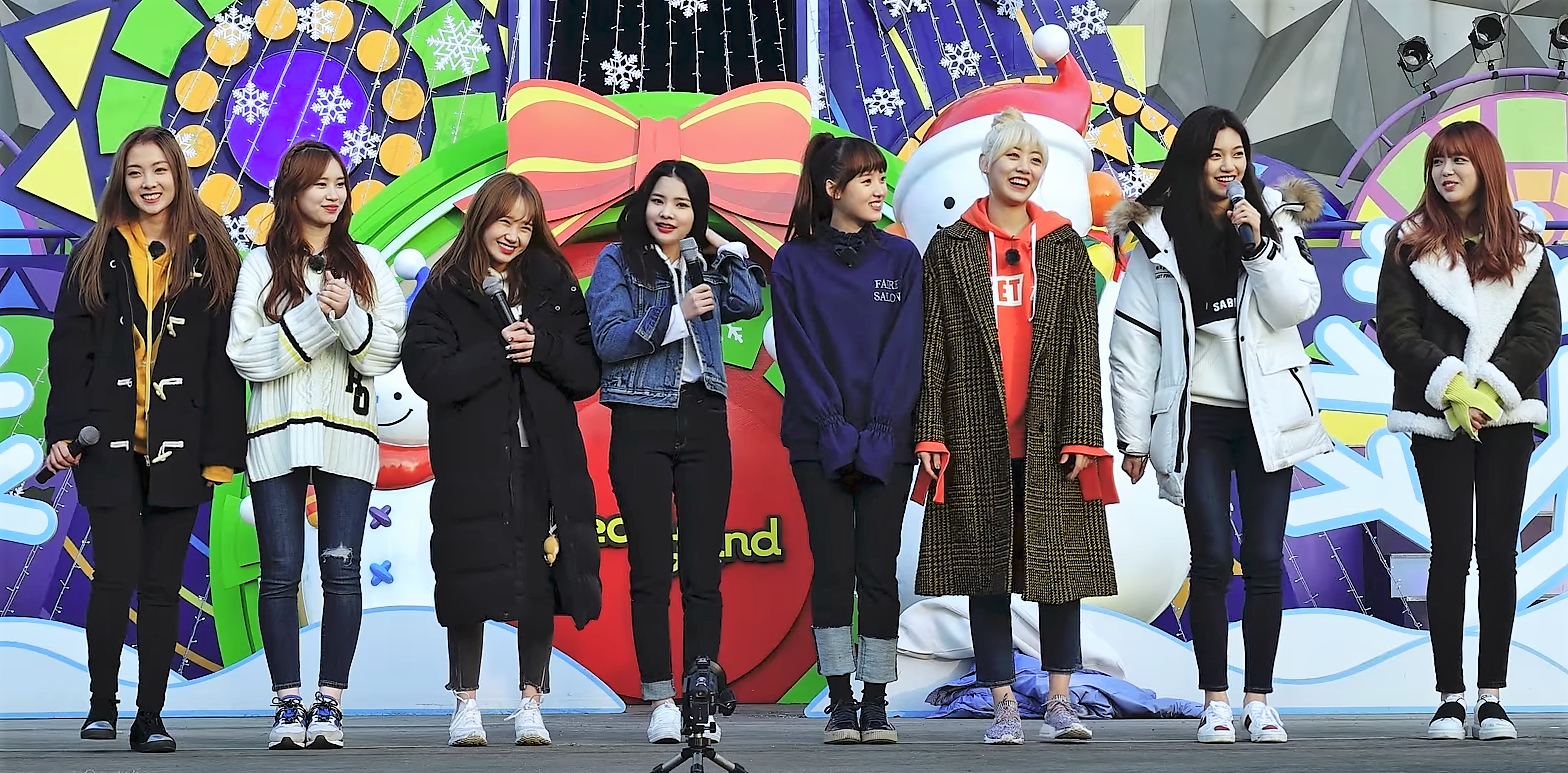
Weki Meki in December 2017

On August 8, 2017, Weki Meki released their debut extended play, Weme. The EP contains six tracks, with the lead single titled "I Don't Like Your Girlfriend." The album also features lyrics written by Choi Yoo-jung. A month later, a limited "B Version" of their debut EP was physically released. In November, according to Gaon Music Chart, the EP sold over 47,000 physical copies since its release, marking the highest-selling album by a girl group that debuted in 2017.

On February 1, 2018, a reality show called "Weki Meki, mohae?" premiered on YouTube. The show had a total of 60 episodes, and lasted until April 1, 2018. The show followed the girls on their 60-day campaign to become an all-around idol. On February 21, Weki Meki released their second extended play titled Lucky. The album features a total of six songs including lead single "La La La" and "Butterfly," the latter being a remake of an original soundtrack from the 2009 sports film Take Off which the group released in support of the 2018 Winter Olympics. Weki Meki released their first single album Kiss, Kicks on October 11. The album features a total of three tracks including lead single "Crush" with rap portions on the album written by member Yoo-jung.

=== 2019–2023: Hide and Seek, New Rules, I Am Me. and Elly's solo activities ===
On May 14, 2019, The group released their second single album Lock End LOL, including the lead single "Picky Picky." A repackage version of the single album titled Week End LOL, featuring the lead single "Tiki-Taka (99%)," released on August 8.

On February 6, 2020, Fantagio Music confirmed that the group will have a comeback with digital single album Dazzle Dazzle on February 20, and confirmed that member Yoojung will join after her hiatus from October 2019. On May 29, Fantagio released a teaser image for the group's third EP, Hide and Seek, which was released on June 18, 2020. It consists of five songs, including the title track "Oopsy" and the previously released single "Dazzle Dazzle." On October 8, Weki Meki released their fourth EP, New Rules, featuring five songs, including the title track "Cool" and its English version "100 Facts," their first song in English.

On November 18, 2021, Weki Meki released their fifth EP, I Am Me., featuring six songs, including the title track "Siesta". In addition, Kim Do-yeon will not present for performance-related activities as she was recovering from a wrist injury. On November 26, 2022, Elly participated as a contestant in the virtual reality competition show Girls Reverse as Watchiswatch. Elly was eliminated in the first elimination round. On June 13, 2023, Elly participated as a contestant in Mnet's reality competition show Queendom Puzzle. Elly was eliminated in the final episode placing 11th with 292,486 votes.

=== 2024: "CoinciDestiny" and disbandment ===
On June 7, 2024, Fantagio released a teaser image for Weki Meki's second and final digital single, "CoinciDestiny", which would be released on June 12. In addition, it was announced that Weki Meki would be disbanding after releasing their final single. On June 12, the music video for "CoinciDestiny" was released. On August 16, Fantagio announced that Weki Meki had ended their activities on August 8, and that members Elly, Sei, Lua, Rina and Lucy also departed from the agency following the expiration of their contracts while Ji Su-yeon, Choi Yoo-jung and Kim Do-yeon were still in discussions regarding a renewal of their contracts. On November 18, after discussions, Ji Su-yeon has chosen to part ways with Fantagio, while Choi Yoo-jung and Kim Do-yeon renewed their contracts with the agency.

== Members ==
- Suyeon (지수연) — leader
- Elly (엘리)
- Yoojung (최유정)
- Doyeon (김도연)
- Sei (세이)
- Lua (루아)
- Rina (리나)
- Lucy (루시)

== Discography ==
=== Extended plays ===
List of extended plays, showing selected details, selected chart positions, and sales figures
Title	Details	Peak chart positions		Sales
Title	Details	KOR	JPN	Sales
Weme	Released: August 8, 2017; Label: Fantagio Music; Formats: CD, digital download	7	—	KOR: 49,476
Lucky	Released: February 21, 2018; Label: Fantagio Music; Formats: CD, digital download, SMC	2	36	KOR: 34,395; JPN: 2,225
Hide and Seek	Released: June 18, 2020; Label: Fantagio Music; Formats: CD, digital download	13	—	KOR: 16,848
New Rules	Released: October 8, 2020; Label: Fantagio Music; Formats: CD, digital download	13	—	KOR: 12,207
I Am Me.	Released: November 18, 2021; Label: Fantagio Music; Formats: CD, digital download	12	—	KOR: 17,366
"—" denotes items that did not chart or were not released.

=== Single albums ===
List of single albums, showing selected details, selected chart positions, and sales figures
Title	Details	Peak chart positions		Sales
Title	Details	KOR	JPN	Sales
Kiss, Kicks	Released: October 11, 2018; Label: Fantagio Music; Formats: CD, digital download	5	—	KOR: 22,281
Lock End LOL	Released: May 14, 2019; Label: Fantagio Music; Formats: CD, digital download	6	91	KOR: 20,051
"—" denotes items that did not chart or were not released.

=== Reissues ===
List of reissues, showing selected details, selected chart positions, and sales figures
Title	Details	Peak chart positions	Sales
Title	Details	KOR	Sales
Week End LOL	Released: August 8, 2019; Label: Fantagio Music; Formats: CD, digital download	7	KOR: 9,149

=== Singles ===
List of singles, showing year released, selected chart positions, sales figures, and name of the album
Title	Year	Peak chart positions		Sales	Album
Title	Year	KOR Circle	US World	Sales	Album
"I Don't Like Your Girlfriend"	2017	95	—	KOR: 21,447	Weme
"La La La"	2018	— (Note: "La La La" did not enter the Gaon Digital Chart, but peaked at number 97 on the component Download Chart.)	—	—N/a	Lucky
"Crush"	2018	—	14	—N/a	Kiss, Kicks
"Picky Picky"	2019	— (Note: "Picky Picky" did not enter the Gaon Digital Chart, but peaked at number 94 on the component Download Chart.)	—	—N/a	Lock End LOL
"Tiki Taka (99%)"	2019	— (Note: "Tiki Taka (99%)" did not enter the Gaon Digital Chart, but peaked at number 191 on the component Download Chart.)	—	—N/a	Week End LOL
"Dazzle Dazzle"	2020	— (Note: "Dazzle Dazzle" did not enter the Gaon Digital Chart, but peaked at number 141 on the component Download Chart.)	—	—N/a	Hide and Seek
"Oopsy"	2020	— (Note: "Oopsy" did not enter the Gaon Digital Chart, but peaked at number 79 on the component Download Chart.)	—	—N/a	Hide and Seek
"Cool"	2020	— (Note: "Cool" did not enter the Gaon Digital Chart, but peaked at number 109 on the component Download Chart.)	25	—N/a	New Rules
"Siesta"	2021	— (Note: "Siesta" did not enter the Gaon Digital Chart, but peaked at number 31 on the component Download Chart.)	—	—N/a	I Am Me.
"CoinciDestiny"	2024	— (Note: "CoinciDestiny" did not enter the Circle Digital Chart, but peaked at number 45 on the component Download Chart.)	—	—N/a	Non-album single
"—" denotes items that did not chart or were not released.

=== Promotional singles ===
Title	Year	Album
"Butterfly"	2018	Lucky
"The Girls Running on the Sanmagiyet-gil" (산막이옛길을 달리는 소녀)	2020	Non-album single

=== Collaborations ===
Title	Year	Album
"All I Want" (with ASTRO, Hello Venus)	2018	FM2018_12Hz

=== Soundtrack appearances ===
Title	Year	Album
"Love Diamond" (Note: Credited as a song by Weki Meki, but sung by Ji Su-yeon and Elly)	2018	Gangnam Beauty OST Part 1
"A Rose Smile" (장미의 미소) (Note: Credited as a song by Weki Meki, but sung by Elly)	2018	My Only One OST Part 7
"Again and Again" (자꾸만) (Note: Credited as a song by Weki Meki, but sung by Yoojung and Doyeon)	2020	Melo, Not Solo OST
"Luv"	2021	Pumpkin Time OST
"Between Us Two" (우리 둘 사이에)	2022	Miracle OST
"Now or Never"	2022	Becoming Witch OST

=== Compilation appearances ===
Title	Year	Album
"One More Time"	2018	Two You Project-Sugar Man 2 Part.12
"Sweety"	2018	Immortal Songs: Singing the Legend (Let's Sing Spring)
"Sunset Glow" (붉은 노을)	2018	tvN 300 x NC Fever Music 2018
"Shinsa-dong and the Man" (신사동 그 사람) (Note: Credited as a song by Weki Meki, but sung by Yoojung and Doyeon)	2020	Immortal Songs: Singing the Legend (Joo Hyun-mi Part 2)
"Stupid Love (6:00 pm)"	2022	Listen-Up Episode 4

== Videography ==
=== Music videos ===
Title	Year	Director(s)	Ref.
"I Don't Like Your Girlfriend"	2017	Seo Hyun-seung (GIGANT)	
"Butterfly"	2018	Unknown	
"La La La"	2018	Seo Hyun-seung (GIGANT)	
"Crush"	2018	Hong Won Ki (Zanybros)	
"Picky Picky"	2019	Jimmy (VIA)	
"Tiki Taka (99%)"	2019	Hong Won Ki (Zanybros)	
"Dazzle Dazzle"	2020	Kim Seung Hoon (IDIWORKS)	
"Oopsy"	2020	Subin Kong (OVJ)	
"Cool"	2020	Choi Eun Hee (zo_oa)	
"The Girls Running on the Sanmagiyet-gil" (산막이옛길을 달리는 소녀)	2020	Unknown	
"Siesta"	2021	Sunny Visual	
"CoinciDestiny"	2024	Unknown	

== Filmography ==
=== Reality shows ===
Year	Title	Channel	Episodes
2018	Weki Meki, What's Up?	Mohae	60
2022	GGULlog.zam: Homecoming Party Weki Meki	Universe	8

=== Dramas ===
Year	Title	Channel	Role
2019	Be Melodramatic	JTBC	Themselves

== Awards and nominations ==
=== Brand of the Year Awards ===
Year	Nominee / work	Award	Result
2017	Weki Meki	Most Anticipated Female Artist – 2018	Nominated
2018	Weki Meki	Most Anticipated Rising Star – 2019	Won

=== Gaon Chart Music Awards ===
Year	Nominee / work	Award	Result
2018	Weki Meki	New Artist of the Year (Album)	Nominated

=== Golden Disc Awards ===
Year	Nominee / work	Award	Result
2018	Weme	Album Main Award	Nominated
2018	Weki Meki	New Artist of the Year	Nominated
2018	Weki Meki	Global Popularity Award	Nominated

=== Korean Culture Entertainment Awards ===
Year	Nominee / work	Award	Result
2018	Weki Meki	K-Pop Singer Award	Won
2020	Weki Meki	K-Pop Artist Award	Won

=== Melon Music Awards ===
Year	Nominee / work	Award	Result
2017	Weki Meki	Best New Artist	Nominated

=== Mnet Asian Music Awards ===
Year	Nominee / work	Award	Result
2017	Weki Meki	Qoo10 Artist of the Year	Nominated
2017	Weki Meki	Best New Female Artist	Nominated

=== Seoul Music Awards ===
Year	Nominee / work	Award	Result
2018	Weki Meki	New Artist Award	Nominated
2018	Weki Meki	Popularity Award	Nominated
2018	Weki Meki	Hallyu Special Award	Nominated
2022	Weki Meki	U+Idol Live Best Artist Award	Nominated

=== Soribada Best K-Music Awards ===
Year	Nominee / work	Award	Result
2019	Weki Meki	Art-tainer Award	Won
