= Fantagio =

South Korean entertainment management company

Fantagio Corp.
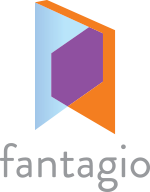
- Native name: 주식회사 판타지오
- Type: Public
- Traded as: KRX: 032800
- Industry: Entertainment; Music; Production
- Genre: K-pop
- Founded: September 16, 2008 (as N.O.A Entertainment Co., Ltd.)
- Founder: Na Byeong-jun
- Headquarters: Fantagio Building, 648 Samseong-ro, Samseong-dong, Gangnam-gu, Seoul, South Korea
- Key people: Shin Youngjin (CEO)
- Services: Talent agency Production company
- Operating income: KR₩14.1 billion (2012); KR₩14.1 billion (2012)
- Net income: KR₩1.6 billion (2012); KR₩1.6 billion (2012)
- Owner: Mirae ING Co., Ltd. (2021–present)
- Subsidiaries: Fantagio Hong Kong; Studio Invictus; Metagio
- Website: fantagio.kr

Fantagio (Korean: 판타지오) is a South Korean entertainment company that operates as a record label, talent training and management agency, as well as movie and K-drama production company. The company was founded in September 2008 as N.O.A. Entertainment (standing for "Network of Asia"), before changing its name to Fantagio in June 2011. In 2012, the company had a reported operating income of KR₩14.1 billion with a net income of KR₩1.8 billion (approximately US$1.6 million).

== History ==
=== 2008–2013: Company creation and initial goals ===
The company was founded on September 16, 2008, as N.O.A. Entertainment by Na Byeong-jun, who previously worked for SidusHQ. From the start, the company focused on talent training and management, with goals of expanding to other ventures like music and movie production. During this time, the company held regular auditions, where they discovered many talented rookies, some of which became representative domestic actors, such as Ha Jung-woo, Jung Il-woo, and Kim Sae-ron.

In June 2011, the company changed its name to Fantagio (compound word of "Fantasy" and "Origin"). The company started its research and development program, with the goal of training and debuting their own K-pop idol groups. The project soon became known as "i-Teen", and was split into i-Teen Boys (which became Astro) and i-Teen Girls (which became Weki Meki). Fantagio also started its actor training program, "Actors League".

In November 2011, Fantagio Corp. created subsidiaries Fantagio Pictures, for film and TV drama production, Fantagio Music, for music production, and Solid C&M, for other ventures.

=== 2012–2015: First groups and actors ===
In May 2012, Fantagio and Pledis Entertainment started a joint venture, and together debuted their first girl group, Hello Venus. On July 31, 2014, the joint venture was terminated due to a conflict between companies, and Fantagio took charge of the group. In the process of termination, 2 members left the group and 2 new members were added. Hello Venus disbanded in May 2019, after their contract expired.

In 2014, in order to improve their stock market status, Fantagio merged with Edu Company, a KOSDAQ listed company. Although Edu Company was the surviving company in the merger, the name was quickly changed back to Fantagio, with Na Byeong-jun becoming the CEO once again. (Note: Edu Company was founded on January 8, 1991.)

On February 23, 2016, the company debuted its first male idol group, ASTRO, with the release of Spring Up. Within a week of its release, it reached number 6 on the Billboard World Albums Chart. It entered the 10th place on the Japanese Tower Records K-Pop chart. It also ranked 4th in the album section of the Gaon Chart, an official domestic music chart. Since their debut, ASTRO has sold over 1.5 million albums.

In 2015, Choi Yoo-jung and Kim Do-yeon competed in the survival show Produce 101, as representatives of Fantagio. They made it into the top 11 and debuted into I.O.I, a temporary girl group under CJ E&M. The group debuted on May 4, 2016, and promoted until the end of January 2017, when the girls returned to their company. Due to group's immense popularity, the fans were curious about the girls' future activities. It was eventually revealed that "i-Teen Girls" would debut on August 8, 2017, under their official name, Weki Meki. Since their debut, the group has sold over 180,000 albums.

=== 2016–present: Controversies regarding ownership and management ===
In 2016, Fantagio sold part of its shares to Gold Finance Korea, the Korean branch of JC Group, a Chinese real estate and investment company. In 2017, through a paid-in capital increase, JC Group became the majority shareholder, holding over 50% of the shares. JC Group then dismissed founder and CEO Na Byung-joon and appointed Wei Jie as CEO. The changes triggered significant internal turmoil, with several actors and key staff members leaving the agency.

In January 2018, employees formed an emergency response committee and threatened a general strike, protesting what they described as the Chinese majority shareholder's illegal and unusual intervention in management.

In April 2019, CEO Wei Jie was arrested in China on charges of illegal financing and fraud related to JC Group's activities. JC Group faced suspension and eventual bankruptcy. Fantagio issued statements assuring stability for its artists.

Ownership later transitioned: in 2020, Gold Finance Korea sold its stake to L&A Holdings. On February 24, 2021, Mirae ING Co., Ltd. (Mirae I&G) became the largest shareholder and remains the majority owner as of 2026. Mirae ING's chairman and major shareholder, businessman Namgoong Kyun (also linked to Humasis and other firms), has faced separate criticism. As of early 2026, Namgoong Kyun is under investigation by South Korean authorities for tax evasion, with probes extending to multiple companies under his control.

These repeated ownership changes and executive turnover have been cited as contributing to ongoing operational and financial instability at the agency.

Fantagio has also faced criticism regarding artist management and protection. On December 3, 2019, actor Cha In-ha (real name Lee Jae-ho), who was under contract with Fantagio, was found dead at his home at age 27. Police ruled the cause of death a suicide due to depression. Fantagio issued a statement expressing grief and asking the public and media to refrain from speculation.

On April 19, 2023, ASTRO member Moonbin died at age 25. Police stated that he appeared to have taken his own life. Following his death, online communities raised questions about workload and mental health support in the highly competitive K-pop industry. Fantagio denied negligence and announced it would take legal action against the spread of malicious rumors.

In April 2025, following a surge in malicious online rumors and defamation against Cha Eun-woo (including accusations related to a tribute song for the late Moonbin), fans organized protests demanding better protection from the agency. On April 21, 2025, fans sent LED protest trucks to Fantagio's headquarters in Gangnam, Seoul, criticizing the agency for allegedly standing by without taking sufficient action against slander despite years of attacks. Additional wreath protests were held on April 23. Fans demanded stronger legal measures and support for the artist's individual activities and long-term growth.

In February 2026, the Korea Exchange (KRX) identified Fantagio as a high-risk entity for potential delisting from KOSDAQ amid tighter delisting rules targeting penny stocks and low market capitalization companies.

In late 2025 and early 2026, Fantagio and several of its artists faced scrutiny from the National Tax Service (NTS) regarding family-run corporations and tax invoices. Fantagio itself received an additional tax assessment of approximately ₩8.2 billion for processing tax invoices that authorities viewed as irregular. In relation to artist Cha Eun-woo, the NTS issued a notification of additional taxes and penalties exceeding ₩20 billion related to a company established by his mother, which authorities considered a "paper company". Both the agency and the artist expressed regret, cooperated with authorities, hired major law firms, and settled the additional dues. On April 8, 2026, Fantagio acknowledged the incidents as "a failure of the company's management responsibility" and promised internal reviews and strengthened oversight.

Similar allegations emerged in February 2026 regarding a one-person family corporation linked to Kim Seon-ho. Fantagio denied tax evasion, stating the entity was established for theatrical productions, had been inactive, and was in the process of dissolution. Kim Seon-ho issued a public apology; the agency confirmed that all due taxes were paid.

== Subsidiaries ==
The company currently has 3 subsidiaries:

- Fantagio Hong Kong is an entertainment company based in Hong Kong
- Studio Invictus is a drama production company based in South Korea
- Metagio is an entertainment company based in Singapore

== Defunct subsidiaries ==
=== Madin Entertainment ===
In January 2011, Fantagio founded its acting management division, Madin Entertainment (Korean: 메이딘엔터테인먼트). As of 2015, Fantagio managed over 50 actors and actresses. On December 31, 2015, all stocks of Madin Entertainment owned by Fantagio were sold to yarn manufacturing company, Kahi.

=== Fantagio Music ===
Fantagio Music was the record label and music production division. It operated as a subsidiary of Fantagio from November 12, 2011, until November 9, 2021, but has since merged with the parent company. In May 2012, Fantagio launched the girl group Hello Venus as part of Tricell Media, a joint venture with Pledis Entertainment; this was dissolved in 2014 and Hello Venus continued under Fantagio Music. Hello Venus disbanded in May 2019. In September 2013 it debuted 5URPRISE, a project boy group whose members are primarily in Fantagio's acting division. The six-member boy group Astro debuted in February 2016; the group also starred in their own drama, To Be Continued. In August 2017, the eight-member girl group Weki Meki debuted, with two members from former group I.O.I, Kim Do-yeon and Choi Yoo-jung. Aside from his acting activities, former Wanna One member Ong Seong-wu released his first mini album, Layers, marking his solo music debut.

=== Fantagio Pictures ===
Fantagio Pictures is credited with production or co-production of the following works:

- Finding Mr. Destiny (2010)
- Silenced (also known as Dogani or The Crucible) (2011)
- Love Fiction (2012)
- Adrenalin (XTM serial) (2012)
- 577 Project (2012)
- Bokbulbok after school (mobile drama; also known as After School: Lucky or Not) (2012)
- Fasten Your Seatbelt (2013)
- Cunning Single Lady (MBC serial) (2014, with IOK Media)
- Liar Game (tvN serial) (2014, with Apollo Pictures)
- To Be Continued (2015)
- Idol Fever (2017)
- Money Flower (2017)
- Dr. Prisoner (2019)
- My Lawyer Mr.Joe 2: Crime and Punishment (2019)
- I Hate You Juliet (2019)
- Born Again (2020)
- Mouse (2021)
- A Good Day to Be a Dog (2023, with Group 8)
- Dare to Love Me (2024)
- Love Song for Illusion (2024, with Monster Union)
- The Wonderfools (2026, with Kakao Entertainment)
- Agent Kim Reactivated (2026, with Studio S)
- Mission: Mompossible (2026, with Monster Union)

=== Solid C&M ===
Solid C&M was Fantagio's division for broadcast program production and content distribution rights. When the subsidiary was created, it was listed as the division for restaurant franchises, education, distribution, and other ventures. Cafe Fantagio was launched in September 2012, but has since been closed. In the past, Fantagio also had investments in dessert restaurant franchise Mango Six.

On March 4, 2013, founder Na Byeong-jun established Fantagio's Manager Training Academy, aiming to train future celebrity managers through a curriculum including classes in film and media relations.

In 2021, Fantagio sold their subsidiaries Fantagio Pictures, Solid C&M, Fantagio China and Fantagio Japan.

== Artists ==
=== Actors and actresses ===
- Ahn Se-min
- Bae Jee-wan
- Baek Seo-bin
- Baek Yoon-sik (2021–present)
- Byun Woo-min
- Cha Eun-woo
- Cha Jun-hwan
- Cho Ye-rim
- Choi Jun-young
- Choi Yoo-jung
- Choi Yun-la
- Choi Ye-jin
- Gong Min-jeung (2024–present)
- Han Gi-chan (2020–present)
- Hyun Jae-yeon
- Jeon Yeo-jin (2025–present)
- Jin Su-hyun
- Jung Eui-jae
- Jung Da-bin (2025–present)
- Kang Ye-won
- Kim Do-yeon
- Kim Hyun (2021–present)
- Kim Jae-young (2026–present)
- Kim Mi-hwa
- Kim Nu-rim
- Kim Seon-ho (2025–present)
- Kim Si-hyun
- Lee Je-yeon
- Lee Se-young (2025–present)
- Lee Sung-kyung (2025–present)
- Lim Ji-sub
- Moon Ga-young (2026–present)
- Ong Seong-wu
- Park Ha-eun
- Park Ye-rin (2021–present)
- Seo Jun
- Yoon San-ha
- Yu Ji-ahn

=== Recording artists ===
Groups

- Astro
- Lun8

Soloists

- Ong Seong-wu
- MJ
- Choi Yoo-jung
- Lee Chang-sub
- Cha Eun-woo
- Yoon San-ha

== Former artists ==
- 5urprise (2013–2020)
- Astro
  - Jinjin & Rocky (2022–2023)
    - Rocky (2016–2023)
  - Moonbin & Sanha (2020–2023)
    - Moonbin (2016–2023)
- Cha In-ha (2017–2019)
- Chu Ye-jin
- Gong Hyo-jin
- Gong Myung (2013–2020)
- Gong Yoo
- Ha Jung-woo (2002–2016)
- Hello Venus (2012–2019)
  - Alice/Song Joo-hee (2012–2019)
  - Nara (2012–2019)
  - Lime/Chae Ju-hwa (2012–2021)
  - Yooyoung/Lee Hwa-kyum (2012–2021)
  - Lee Seo-young (2014–2022)
  - Yu Na-gyeol/Yeoreum (2014–2022)
- Hwang Bo-ra (2014–2016)
- Im Soo-jung (until 2011)
- Ji Jin-hee (2009–2013)
- Jin Geon-woo (2017–2026)
- Joo Jin-mo (until 2016)
- Jo Yoon-hee (2008-2014)
- Jung Chan-woo (2010–2013)
- Jung Gyu-woon (2008–2016)
- Jung Il-woo (2010–2012)
- Jung Kyung-ho (2008–2015)
- Jung Min-gyu (2023–2026)
- Kang Chan-hee (2009–2013)
- Kang Han-na (2013–2020)
- Kang Tae-oh (2013–2020)
- Kim Da-hyun (1999–2014)
- Kim Jun-Hyeong
- Kim Sae-ron (2009–2016)
- Kim So-eun (2008–2016)
- Kim Seo-hyung (until 2015)
- Kim Sun-a (2014–2015)
- Kim Sung-kyun (2012–2018)
- Kim Sung-soo (2008–2015)
- Kim Young-ae (2008–2016)
- Lee Chun-hee
- Lee Jong-uk
- Lee So-yeon (2014–2017)
- Lee Tae-hwan (2013–2020)
- Moon Yoon-bin
- Park Hae-in
- Park Sol-mi
- Seo Kang-joon (2013–2020)
- Seo Min-ji (2011–2013)
- Sung Yu-ri (2014–2015)
- Yoo Il (2013–2020)
- Yoon Seung-ah (2010–2016)
- Yum Jung-ah (2004–2017)
- Weki Meki (2017–2024)
  - Ji Su-yeon (2017–2024)
  - Elly (2017–2024)
  - Sei (2017–2024)
  - Lua (2017–2024)
  - Rina (2017–2024)
  - Lucy (2017–2024)
