= AOA discography =

South Korean-based girl group discography

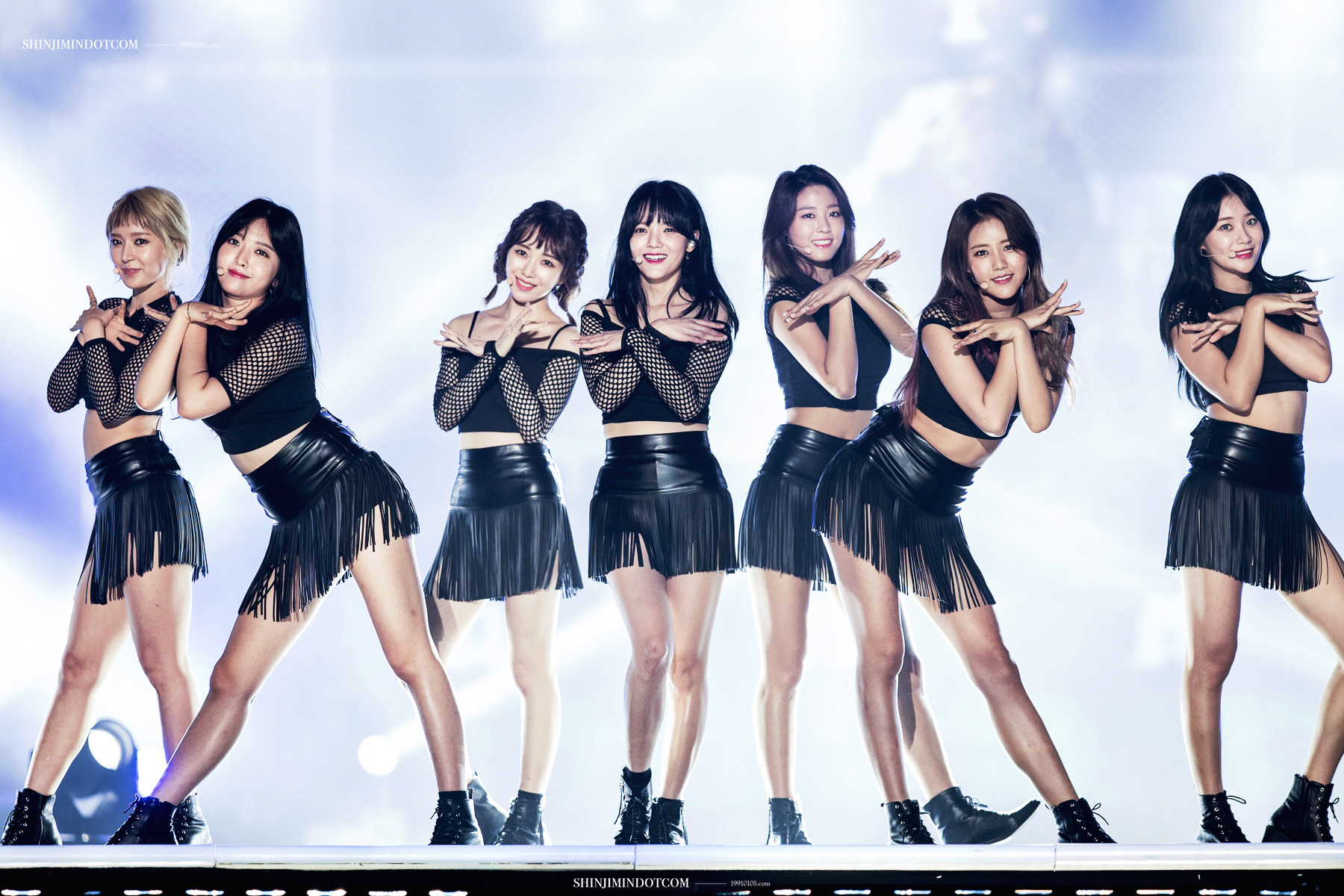
- AOA in 2016
- Studio albums: 3
- EPs: 6
- Compilation albums: 1
- Singles: 19
- Music videos: 21
- Promotional singles: 4

South Korean-based girl group AOA have released three studio albums, one compilation album, six extended plays, five single albums, nineteen singles (including 14 digital singles in Korean and five physical singles in Japan), and four promotional singles.

Formed by FNC Entertainment, AOA debuted in July 2012 with the release of their first single album, Angels' Story, and its single Elvis. Three months later, they released a second single album, Wanna Be, in October 2012. In 2013, they released two more single albums, Moya (as a sub-unit AOA Black) and Red Motion, in July and October respectively. A fifth single album titled Miniskirt was released in January 2014, which spawned the first Top 20 single on the Gaon Singles Chart for the group. In 2014, AOA returned twice more times with the release their first and second EPs, Short Hair and Like a Cat, in June and November respectively. The third EP, Heart Attack (2015), becomes the group's best-selling album in Korean with total sales of more than 47,000 physical copies. AOA's fourth EP titled Good Luck, which was released in May 2016, sold more than 40,000 physical copies as of December 2016. In January 2017, AOA released their debut Korean studio album titled Angel's Knock. One year hiatus after the member Choa's departure, the group returned with their fifth EP, Bingle Bangle, released on May 28, 2018. AOA returned with their sixth EP, New Moon, released on November 26, 2019.

A Japanese version of AOA's breakout hit, "Miniskirt," was released as their debut Japanese-language single in October 2014 and peaked at number 13 on the Oricon Singles Chart. AOA then released their debut Japanese studio album titled Ace of Angels one year later in October 2015. The Japanese versions of "Like a Cat" and "Heart Attack" were also released as singles, reaching number four and number six respectively on the Oricon Singles Chart. Their fourth and first original Japanese single, "Give Me the Love," featuring vocals of Takanori Nishikawa was released in April 2016. AOA's fifth Japanese single, "Good Luck," was released in August 2016. In November 2016, AOA released their second Japanese studio album titled Runway.

== Albums ==
=== Studio albums ===
List of studio albums, with selected details, chart positions, and sales
Title	Album details	Peak chart positions			Sales
Title	Album details	KOR	JPN	US World	Sales
Ace of Angels	Released: October 14, 2015 (JPN); Label: Delicious Deli, Universal Music; Formats: CD, digital download, streaming	—	2	—	—
Runway	Released: November 30, 2016 (JPN); Label: Virgin Music, Universal Music; Format: CD, digital download, streaming	—	5	—	—
Angel's Knock	Released: January 2, 2017 (KOR); Label: FNC Entertainment; Formats: CD, digital download, streaming	3	39	5	KOR: 35,013
"—" denotes releases that did not chart or were not released in that region.

=== Compilation albums ===
List of compilation albums, with selected details
Title	Album details
AOA Best Songs for Asia	Released: September 26, 2014 (TWN); Label: FNC Entertainment; Formats: CD, digital download

=== Single albums ===
List of single albums, with selected details, chart positions, and sales
Title	Album details	Peak chart positions	Sales
Title	Album details	KOR	Sales
Angels' Story	Released: July 30, 2012; Label: FNC Entertainment; Formats: CD, digital download, streaming	8	KOR: 2,987
Wanna Be	Released: October 10, 2012; Label: FNC Entertainment; Formats: CD, digital download, streaming	5	KOR: 4,406
Red Motion	Released: October 14, 2013; Label: FNC Entertainment; Formats: CD, digital download, streaming	12	KOR: 7,378
Miniskirt	Released: January 16, 2014; Label: FNC Entertainment; Formats: CD, digital download, streaming	9	KOR: 14,653

== Extended plays ==
List of extended plays, with selected details, chart positions, and sales
Title	EP details	Peak chart positions			Sales
Title	EP details	KOR	JPN	US World	Sales
Short Hair	Released: June 19, 2014; Label: FNC Entertainment; Formats: CD, digital download, streaming	4	—	—	KOR: 16,196
Like a Cat	Released: November 11, 2014; Label: FNC Entertainment; Formats: CD, digital download, streaming	3	—	—	KOR: 22,259
Heart Attack	Released: June 22, 2015; Label: FNC Entertainment; Formats: CD, digital download, streaming	2	—	5	KOR: 47,094
Good Luck	Released: May 16, 2016; Label: FNC Entertainment; Formats: CD, digital download, streaming	2	48	7	KOR: 40,282
Bingle Bangle	Released: May 28, 2018; Label: FNC Entertainment; Formats: CD, digital download, streaming	3	—	10	KOR: 21,872
New Moon	Released: November 26, 2019; Label: FNC Entertainment; Formats: CD, digital download, streaming	3	—	—	KOR: 15,553
"—" denotes releases that did not chart or were not released in that region.

== Singles ==
=== As lead artist ===
List of singles as lead artist, with selected chart positions, sales figures, and certifications, showing year released and album name
Title	Year	Peak chart positions				Sales (Note: Sales figures for tracks are based on digital downloads, except noted.)	Album
Title	Year	KOR	KOR Hot	JPN	US World	Sales	Album
Korean
"Elvis"	2012	69	87	—	—	—	Angels' Story
"Get Out"	2012	77	88	—	—	—	Wanna Be
"Confused" (흔들려)	2013	40	38	—	—	—	Red Motion
"Miniskirt" (짧은치마)	2014	11	8	—	—	KOR: 1,104,681	Miniskirt
"Short Hair" (단발머리)	2014	5	4	—	—	KOR: 954,508	Short Hair
"Like a Cat" (사뿐사뿐)	2014	5	(Note: The Korea K-Pop Hot 100 chart was launched in 2011 by Billboard and was discontinued in 2014.)	—	7	KOR: 1,135,544	Like a Cat
"Heart Attack" (심쿵해)	2015	2	(Note: The Korea K-Pop Hot 100 chart was launched in 2011 by Billboard and was discontinued in 2014.)	—	7	KOR: 1,604,763	Heart Attack
"Good Luck"	2016	2	(Note: The Korea K-Pop Hot 100 chart was launched in 2011 by Billboard and was discontinued in 2014.)	—	5	KOR: 672,022	Good Luck
"Excuse Me"	2017	22	(Note: The Korea K-Pop Hot 100 chart was launched in 2011 by Billboard and was discontinued in 2014.)	—	6	KOR: 570,632	Angel's Knock
"Bing Bing" (빙빙)	2017	47	(Note: The Korea K-Pop Hot 100 chart was launched in 2011 by Billboard and was discontinued in 2014.)	—	15	KOR: 90,215	Angel's Knock
"Bingle Bangle" (빙글뱅글)	2018	4	3	—	—	—N/a	Bingle Bangle
"Sorry"	2019	—	—	—	—	—N/a	Queendom Final Comeback and New Moon
"Come See Me" (날 보러 와요)	2019	51	29	—	8	—N/a	New Moon
Japanese
"Miniskirt" (ミニスカート)	2014	—	—	13	—	—	Ace of Angels
"Like a Cat"	2015	—	—	4	—	—	Ace of Angels
"Heart Attack" (胸キュン)	2015	—	—	6	—	—	Ace of Angels
"Give Me the Love" (featuring Takanori Nishikawa)	2016	—	—	3	—	—	Runway
"Good Luck"	2016	—	—	3	—	—	Runway
"—" denotes releases that did not chart or were not released in that region.

=== Promotional singles ===
List of promotional singles, showing year released and album name
Title	Year	Album
"Oh Boy"	2015	Ace of Angels
"Wow War Tonight: Toki ni wa Okose yo Movement" (Girls version) (WOW WAR TONIGHT ～時には起こせよムーヴメント)	2016	Runway
"—" denotes releases that did not chart or were not released in that region.

== Other charted songs ==
List of other charted songs, with selected chart positions and sales figures, showing year released and album name
Title	Year	Peak chart positions			Album
Title	Year	KOR	KOR Hot	US World	Album
"Luv Me"	2015	99	—	—	Heart Attack
"Egotistic" (너 나해)	2019	108	92	14	Queendom: Cover Contest Part 1
"—" denotes releases that did not chart or were not released in that region.

== Videography ==
=== DVDs ===
- 2014: AOA's Hot Summer Photobook
- 2015: 1st Concert in Japan "ANGELS WORLD 2015 ~Oh BOY ACADEMY~" Digest
- 2016: AOA Summer Concert in Japan 〜Angels World 2016〜 at Tokyo Dome City Hall

=== Music videos ===
List of music videos, with other versions, showing year released
Title	Year	Director	Other version(s)	Ref.
Korean
"Elvis"	2012	Hong Won-ki (Zanybros)	Band Version	—N/a
"Get Out"	2012	Hong Won-ki (Zanybros)		—N/a
"Moya" (as AOA Black)	2013	Hong Won-ki (Zanybros)		—N/a
"Confused"	2013	Hong Won-ki (Zanybros)		—N/a
"Miniskirt"	2014	Hong Won-ki (Zanybros)	Extended Cut Version	
"Short Hair"	2014	Hong Won-ki (Zanybros)		—N/a
"Like a Cat"	2014	Hong Won-ki (Zanybros)		—N/a
"Heart Attack	2015	Hong Won-ki (Zanybros)	Choreography Version	
"I'm Jelly Baby" (as AOA Cream)	2016	Hong Won-ki (Zanybros)		—N/a
"Good Luck"	2016	Hong Won-ki (Zanybros)		—N/a
"Excuse Me"	2017	Hong Won-ki (Zanybros)		
"Bing Bing"	2017	Hong Won-ki (Zanybros)		—N/a
"Bingle Bangle"	2018	Ziyong Kim (FantazyLab)		
"Come See Me"	2019	Kim Ja-Kyoung (Flexible Pictures)		—N/a
Japanese
"Miniskirt"	2014	Hong Won-ki (Zanybros)		—N/a
"Like a Cat"	2015	Hong Won-ki (Zanybros)	Dance Version	—N/a
"Heart Attack"	2015	Hong Won-ki (Zanybros)	Dance Version	—N/a
"Oh Boy"	2015	Hong Won-ki (Zanybros)	Dance Version	—N/a
"Give Me the Love" (feat. Takanori Nishikawa)	2016	Hong Won-ki (Zanybros)	Dance Version	—N/a
"Good Luck"	2016	Hong Won-ki (Zanybros)		—N/a
"Wow War Tonight 〜Get On Up Join Our Movement (Girls Version)"	2016	Hong Won-ki (Zanybros)	Dance Version	—N/a
