= FNC Entertainment discography =

This is a complete list of album releases in chronological order by FNC Entertainment.

== 2007 ==
Released	Title	Artist	Format	Language
June 7	Cheerful Sensibility	F.T. Island	CD, digital download	Korean
December 3	The Refreshment	F.T. Island	CD, digital download	Korean

== 2008 ==
Released	Title	Artist	Format	Language
April 3	"2008 Yeonga FTIsland"	F.T. Island	Digital download	Korean
June 7	Prologue of F.T. Island: Soyogi	F.T. Island	CD, digital download	Japanese
August 22	Colorful Sensibility	F.T. Island	CD, digital download	Korean
October 17	Colorful Sensibility Part 2	F.T. Island	CD, digital download	Korean
December 3	The One	F.T. Island	CD, digital download	Japanese

== 2009 ==
Released	Title	Artist	Format	Language
February 11	Jump Up	F.T. Island	CD, digital download	Korean
April 22	"I Believe Myself"	F.T. Island	CD, digital download	Japanese
July 16	Cross & Change	F.T. Island	CD, digital download	Korean
August 19	Now or Never	CNBLUE	CD, digital download	English
October 19	"Love Letter"	F.T. Triple	Digital download	Korean
October 26	Double Date	F.T. Island	CD, digital download	Korean
November 25	Voice	CNBLUE	CD, digital download	English
December 16	So Long, Au Revoir	F.T. Island	CD, digital download	Japanese

== 2010 ==
Released	Title	Artist	Format	Language
January 14	Bluetory	CNBLUE	CD, digital download	Korean
January 23	"The Way"	CNBLUE	CD, digital download	Japanese
March 20	Thank U	CNBLUE	CD, digital download	Japanese
April 15	Japan Special Album Vol. 1	F.T. Island	CD, digital download	Japanese
May 19	"Flower Rock"	F.T. Island	CD, digital download	Japanese
May 19	Bluelove	CNBLUE	CD, digital download	Korean
July 14	"Brand-new Days"	F.T. Island	CD, digital download	Japanese
August 25	Beautiful Journey	F.T. Island	CD, digital download	Korean
August 26	"I Don't Know Why"	CNBLUE	CD, digital download	Japanese
October 20	"TWENTYth Urban"	F.T. Island	Digital download	Korean
November 11	"I Love You and I Love You"	Oh Won-bin	Digital download	Korean
November 17	"So Today..."	F.T. Island	CD, digital download	Japanese

== 2011 ==
Released	Title	Artist	Format	Language
January 9	"Re-maintenance"	CNBLUE	CD, digital download	Japanese
January 14	"For First Time Lovers"	Jung Yong-hwa	Digital download	Korean
January 19	Oh Won Bin 1st Mini Album	Oh Won-bin	CD, digital download	Taiwanese
March 14	C'mon Girl	Oh Won-bin	CD, digital download	Japanese
March 21	First Step	CNBLUE	CD, digital download	Korean
April 20	"Satisfaction"	F.T. Island	CD, digital download	Japanese
April 26	First Step +1 Thank You	CNBLUE	CD, digital download	Korean
April 29	Ready Go	Juniel	CD, digital download	Japanese
May 18	Five Treasure Island	F.T. Island	CD, digital download	Japanese
May 24	Return	F.T. Island	CD, digital download	Korean
June 21	Good For You	Oh Won Bin	CD, digital download	Japanese
July 12	Dream & Hope	Juniel	CD, digital download	Japanese
July 27	"Let It Go!"	F.T. Island	CD, digital download	Japanese
September 1	392	CNBLUE	CD, digital download	Japanese
September 28	Best Recommendation for Japan – Our Favorite Korean Songs	F.T. Island	CD, digital download	Japanese
September 29	"To the Star"	Oh Won Bin	CD, digital download	Japanese
October 10	Memory in FTIsland	F.T. Island	CD, digital download	Korean
October 19	"In My Head"	CNBLUE	CD, digital download	Japanese
November 2	"Forever"	Juniel	CD, digital download	Japanese
November 30	"Distance"	F.T. Island	CD, digital download	Japanese
December 1	Threads of Your Clothes	M Signal	CD, digital download	Korean

== 2012 ==
Released	Title	Artist	Format	Language
January 19	Two of Us	M Signal	Digital download	Korean
January 31	Grown Up	F.T. Island	CD, digital download	Korean
February 1	"Where You Are"	CNBLUE	CD, digital download	Japanese
February 15	"Sakura ~Todokanu Omoi~"	Juniel	CD, digital download	Japanese
March 14	Voice (re-released)	CNBLUE	CD, digital download	Japanese
March 26	Ear Fun	CNBLUE	CD, digital download	Korean
April 18	"Neverland"	F.T. Island	CD, digital download	Japanese
May 16	20 (Twenty)	F.T. Island	CD, digital download	Japanese
June 7	My First June	Juniel	CD, digital download	Korean
July 30	Angels' Story	AOA	CD, digital download	Korean
July 31	"Friday"	CNBLUE	Digital download	Korean
August 1	"Come On"	CNBLUE	CD, digital download	Japanese
August 8	"Top Secret"	F.T. Island	CD, digital download	Japanese
August 29	Code Name Blue	CNBLUE	CD, digital download	Japanese
September 10	Five Treasure Box	F.T. Island	CD, digital download	Korean
October 10	Wanna Be	AOA	CD, digital download	Korean
November 20	1&1	Juniel	CD, digital download	Korean
November 28	"Polar Star"	F.T. Island	CD, digital download	Japanese
December 19	"Robot"	CNBLUE	CD, digital download	Japanese

== 2013 ==
Released	Title	Artist	Format	Language
January 14	Re:Blue	CNBLUE	CD, digital download	Korean
March 6	Juni	Juniel	CD, digital download	Japanese
March 18	Now or Never (re-released)	CNBLUE	CD, digital download	English
March 27	"You Are My Life"	F.T. Island	CD, digital download	Japanese
April 24	"Blind Love"	CNBLUE	CD, digital download	Japanese
April 25	Fall in L	Juniel	CD, digital download	Korean
June 5	Rated-FT	F.T. Island	CD, digital download	Japanese
July 24	"Shiawase Theory"	F.T. Island	CD, digital download	Japanese
July 26	Moya	AOA Black	CD, digital download	Korean
July 31	"Lady"	CNBLUE	CD, digital download	Japanese
August 28	What Turns You On?	CNBLUE	CD, digital download	Japanese
September 18	The Singles Collection	F.T. Island	CD, digital download	Japanese
September 23	Thanks To	F.T. Island	CD, digital download	Korean
October 1	"Basket"	N.Flying	CD, digital download	Japanese
October 14	Red Motion	AOA	CD, digital download	Korean
November 18	The Mood	F.T. Island	CD, digital download	Korean
November 26	Present	CNBLUE	CD, digital download	Korean

== 2014 ==
Released	Title	Artist	Format	Language
January 1	"One and Only"	N.Flying	CD, digital download	Japanese
January 16	Miniskirt	AOA	CD, digital download	Korean
January 22	"Beautiful"	F.T. Island	CD, digital download	Japanese
February 5	Korea Best Album 'Present'	CNBLUE	CD, digital download	Japanese
February 24	Can't Stop	CNBLUE	CD, digital download	Korean
April 2	"Mitaiken Future"	F.T. Island	CD, digital download	Japanese
April 16	"The Next Day"	Juniel	Digital download	Korean
April 23	"Truth"	CNBLUE	CD, digital download	Japanese
May 28	New Page	F.T. Island	CD, digital download	Japanese
June 19	Short Hair	AOA	CD, digital download	Korean
August 20	"Go Your Way"	CNBLUE	CD, digital download	Japanese
September 17	Wave	CNBLUE	CD, digital download	Japanese
September 29	"I Think I'm In Love"	Juniel	Digital download	Korean
October 1	"Miniskirt"	AOA	CD, digital download	Japanese
October 2	Japan Best - All About	F.T. Island	CD, digital download	Korean
October 15	"To the Light"	F.T. Island	CD, digital download	Japanese
November 11	Like a Cat	AOA	CD, digital download	Korean
December 23	"You, My Star"	Jung Yong-hwa	Digital download	Korean

== 2015 ==
Released	Title	Artist	Format	Language
January 20	One Fine Day	Jung Yong-hwa	CD, digital download	Korean
February 25	"Like a Cat"	AOA	CD, digital download	Japanese
March 23	I Will	F.T. Island	CD, digital download	Korean
April 8	"White"	CNBLUE	CD, digital download	Japanese
April 28	"God"	JNJ	Digital download	Korean
May 13	5.....Go	F.T. Island	CD, digital download	Japanese
May 20	Awesome	N.Flying	CD, digital download	Korean
June 22	Heart Attack	AOA	CD, digital download	Korean, Chinese
July 29	"Heart Attack"	AOA	CD, digital download	Japanese
August 21	"Sorry"	Juniel	Digital download	Korean
September 14	2gether	CNBLUE	CD, digital download	Korean
September 16	"Puppy"	F.T. Island	CD, digital download	Japanese
September 30	Colors	CNBLUE	CD, digital download	Japanese, English
October 22	Lonely	N.Flying	CD, digital download	Korean
October 26	Ace of Angels	AOA	CD, digital download	Japanese
November 12	"Cinderella Remix"	CNBLUE	Digital download	Japanese
November 18	FM302	Lee Hong-gi	CD, digital download	Korean
December 9	AM302	Lee Hong-gi	CD, digital download	Japanese
December 17	"Flame"	Choa	Digital download	Korean

== 2016 ==
Released	Title	Artist	Format	Language
January 15	"Empathy"	Jung Yong-hwa & Sunwoo Jung-a	Digital download	Korean
January 29	"I Remember"	Innovator (featuring Esna)	Digital download	Korean
February 10	"Knock Knock"	N.Flying	CD, digital download	Japanese
February 12	"I'm Jelly Baby"	AOA Cream	Digital download	Korean
March 3	"Call You Bae"	Jimin (featuring Xiumin)	Digital download	Korean
April 4	Blueming	CNBLUE	CD, digital download	Korean, English
April 6	N.W.U	F.T. Island	CD, digital download	Japanese
April 20	"Give Me the Love"	AOA	CD, digital download	Japanese
May 11	"Puzzle"	CNBLUE	CD, digital download	Japanese
May 16	Good Luck	AOA	CD, digital download	Korean
July 6	"Endless Summer"	N.Flying	CD, digital download	Japanese
July 18	Where's the Truth?	F.T. Island	CD, digital download	Korean
July 27	Sparkling Night	Lee Jong-hyun	CD, digital download	Japanese
August 3	"Good Luck"	AOA	CD, digital download	Japanese
August 17	"Just Do It"	F.T. Island	CD, digital download	Japanese
September 6	"Mom's Favorite"	Innovator (featuring Basick)	Digital download	Korean
October 5	Feeling Sensation	SF9	CD, digital download	Korean
October 19	Euphoria	CNBLUE	CD, digital download	Japanese, English
November 30	Runway	AOA	CD, digital download	Japanese
December 22	"So Beautiful"	SF9	Digital download	Korean

== 2017 ==
Released	Title	Artist	Format	Language
January 2	Angel's Knock	AOA	CD, digital download	Korean
February 6	Burning Sensation	SF9	CD, digital download	Korean
March 20	7°CN	CNBLUE	CD, digital download	Korean
April 12	United Shadows	F.T. Island	CD, digital download	Japanese
April 18	Breaking Sensation	SF9	CD, digital download	Korean
April 26	"Fanfare"	SF9	CD, digital download	Japanese
May 10	"Shake"	CNBLUE	CD, digital download	Japanese
May 17	Like You	Honeyst	CD, digital download	Korean
June 7	Over 10 Years	F.T. Island	CD, digital download	Korean
July 17	Do Disturb	Jung Yong-hwa	CD, digital download	Korean
August 2	The Real: N.Flying	N.Flying	CD, digital download	Korean
August 2	"Easy Love"	SF9	CD, digital download	Japanese
August 9	Summer Calling	Jung Yong-hwa	CD, digital download	English, Korean
August 23	"Paradise"	F.T. Island	CD, digital download	Japanese
October 12	Knights of the Sun	SF9	CD, digital download	Korean
October 26	"Hallelujah"	Jimin	Digital download	Korean
October 18	Stay Gold	CNBLUE	CD, digital download	Japanese
November 22	Someone to Love	Honeyst	CD, digital download	Korean
December 13	Sensational Feeling Nine	SF9	CD, digital download	Japanese

== 2018 ==
Released	Title	Artist	Format	Language
January 3	The Hottest: N.Flying	N.Flying	CD, digital download	Korean
January 19	"Hey"	Jimin	Digital download	Korean
February 26	Mamma Mia!	SF9	CD, digital download	Korean
April 8	"FNC LAB 'Still Love You'"	Lee Hong-gi; Yoo Hwe-seung	Digital download	Korean
April 11	Planet Bonds	F.T. Island	CD, digital download	Japanese
May 16	How Are You?	N.Flying	CD, digital download	Korean
May 23	"Mamma Mia!"	SF9	CD, digital download	Japanese
May 26	"Letter"	Jung Yong-hwa	Digital download	Japanese
May 28	Bingle Bangle	AOA	CD, digital download	Korean
July 23	What If	F.T. Island	CD, digital download	Korean
July 31	Sensuous	SF9	CD, digital download	Korean
August 22	"Pretty Girl"	F.T. Island	CD, digital download	Japanese
August 29	Best of CNBLUE / Our Book [2011-2018]	CNBLUE	CD, digital download	Japanese
October 18	Do n Do	Lee Hong-gi	CD, digital download	Korean
October 26	"Like a Flower"	N.Flying	Digital download	Korean
October 31	"Now or Never"	SF9	CD, digital download	Japanese
December 5	Cheers	Lee Hong-gi	CD, digital download	Japanese
December 17	"FNC LAB #2 'It's Christmas'"	FNC Artist	Digital download	Korean

== 2019 ==
Released	Title	Artist	Format	Language
January 2	"Rooftop"	N.Flying	Digital download	Korean
January 21	Let's Play Cherry Bullet	Cherry Bullet	CD, digital download	Korean
February 20	Narcissus	SF9	CD, digital download	Korean
March 20	Illuminate	SF9	CD, digital download	Japanese
April 24	Spring Memories	N.Flying	CD, digital download	Korean
May 22	Brotherhood	N.Flying	CD, digital download	Japanese
May 22	Love Adventure	Cherry Bullet	CD, digital download	Korean
June 17	RPM	SF9	CD, digital download	Korean
September 9	Zapping	F.T. Island	CD, digital download	Korean
September 11	"RPM"	SF9	CD, digital download	Japanese
October 15	Yaho	N.Flying	CD, digital download	Korean
November 13	"Doll/Kick-Ass"	N.Flying	CD, digital download	Japanese
November 26	New Moon	AOA	CD, digital download	Korean

== 2020 ==
Released	Title	Artist	Format	Language
January 7	First Collection	SF9	CD, digital download	Korean
February 5	Mixtape	Lee Hong-gi	CD, digital download	Japanese
February 11	"Hands Up"	Cherry Bullet	Digital download	Korean
June 10	So, Communication	N.Flying	CD, digital download	Korean
June 17	"Good Guy"	SF9	CD, digital download	Japanese
July 6	9loryUS	SF9	CD, digital download	Korean
July 24	"Starlight"	N.Flying	Digital download	Korean
August 6	"Aloha Oe"	Cherry Bullet	Digital download	Korean
October 5	Special History Book	SF9	CD, digital download	Korean
October 28	Disharmony: Stand Out	P1Harmony	CD, digital download	Korean
November 17	Re-Code	CNBLUE	CD, digital download	Korean
December 9	Golden Echo	SF9	CD, digital download	Japanese

== 2021 ==
Released	Title	Artist	Format	Language
January 20	Cherry Rush	Cherry Bullet	CD, digital download	Korean
February 22	On The Track	J.Don	CD, digital download	Korean
April 20	Disharmony: Break Out	P1Harmony	CD, digital download	Korean
June 7	Man on the Moon	N.Flying	CD, digital download	Korean
June 23	"Zoom"	CNBLUE	CD, digital download	Japanese
June 30	"Amnesia"	N.Flying	CD, digital download	Japanese
July 5	Turn Over	SF9	CD, digital download	Korean
October 6	Turbulence	N.Flying	CD, digital download	Korean
October 20	Wanted	CNBLUE	CD, digital download	Korean
November 22	Rumination	SF9	CD, digital download	Korean
December 10	Lock Up	F.T. Island	CD, digital download	Korean
December 30	"Savior"	SF9	Digital download	Korean

== 2022 ==
Released	Title	Artist	Format	Language
January 3	Disharmony: Find Out	P1Harmony	CD, digital download	Korean
March 2	Cherry Wish	Cherry Bullet	CD, digital download	Korean
June 29	The Best 〜Dear Fantasy〜	SF9	CD, digital download	Japanese
July 13	The Wave OF9	SF9	CD, digital download	Korean
July 20	Harmony: Zero In	P1Harmony	CD, digital download	Korean
October 17	Dearest	N.Flying	CD, digital download	Korean
November 30	Harmony: Set In	P1Harmony	CD, digital download	Korean
December 2	"Sing Along"	FNC Artists	Digital download	Japanese

== 2023 ==
Released	Title	Artist	Format	Language
January 9	The Piece OF9	SF9	CD, digital download	Korean
March 7	Cherry Dash	Cherry Bullet	CD, digital download	Korean
August 13	Traveling Fish	Hwiyoung (SF9)	Digital download	Korean
November 15	Ampersand One	Ampers&One	CD, digital download	Korean
