= Ace of Angels (album) =

- Regular and digital edition cover

Studio album by AOA
- Released: October 14, 2015
- Recorded: 2014–2015
- Studios: Brave (Seoul); FNC (Seoul)
- Genres: Electropop; dance-pop
- Language: Japanese
- Labels: Universal Music; Delicious Deli

AOA chronology
Heart Attack (2015)	Ace of Angels (2015)	Good Luck (2016)

Singles from Ace of Angels
- 1. "Miniskirt" Released: October 1, 2014; 2. "Like a Cat" Released: February 25, 2015; 3. "Heart Attack" Released: July 29, 2015

Ace of Angels is the first studio album and major Japanese release by South Korean girl group AOA. It was released on October 14, 2015 through Universal Music Japan.

To promote the album, AOA embarked on their first Japan concert tour, Angels World 2015 ~Oh Boy Academy~, in December 2015.

== Background and release ==
After releasing three singles in the Japanese market, including "Miniskirt", "Like a Cat", and "Heart Attack", AOA announced that they would release their debut Japanese studio album titled Ace of Angels on October 14, 2015, including eight previously released songs and three new original songs, "Oh Boy", "Lemon Slush", and "Stay with Me".

A music video and a dance version for the track "Oh Boy" were released along with the formal release of the album on October 14, 2015.

== Editions ==
Ace of Angels was released in ten different physical versions: A Limited CD+DVD Edition (Type A), a Limited CD+Desk Calendar Edition (Type B), seven Limited Picture Label Member CD Editions, and a Regular CD Edition.

- Limited CD+DVD edition comes with a bonus DVD featuring "Oh Boy"'s original and dance versions of the music video, plus "Miniskirt", "Like a Cat", and "Heart Attack" Japanese music videos.
- Limited CD+Desk Calendar edition comes with a bonus desk calendar.
- Limited picture label member CD editions come in a standard jewel case without album cover and lyrics booklet. There are a total of seven editions in matching with seven members.
- Regular CD edition comes in a standard jewel case with a lyrics-only booklet.

== Singles ==
"Miniskirt" is AOA's debut single in Japanese. The single was the first ever Japanese-language track released by AOA on October 1, 2014 in Japan. The short version of music video "Miniskirt" was released on September 8, 2014. The full music video for "Miniskirt" was released on September 10, 2014. The physical single also included the Japanese version of "Short Hair" and the original version of the Korean track "Get Out".

AOA released their second Japanese single titled "Like a Cat" on February 25, 2015. The short version of music video was released on February 8, 2015. A dance version was officially released on February 25, 2015 on AOA's Vevo channel. The physical single included the Japanese versions of "Elvis" and "Just the Two of Us", which were previously available on AOA's first single album Angels' Story (2012) and their second EP, Like a Cat (2014), respectively.

The third Japanese single, "Heart Attack," was physically released on July 29, 2015. The short version of music video was released on July 19, 2015. The full music video was released on the next day, July 20, 2015. A dance version was available on July 4, 2015 on AOA's Vevo channel. The physical single included the Japanese versions of "Confused" and "Joa Yo!", which were previously available on the fourth Korean single album Red Motion (2013) and the first EP Short Hair (2014), respectively.

The first track, "Oh Boy", was released digitally as the only promotional single for the album on October 1, 2015, and two versions of its music video were included in the DVD of the album.

== Track listing ==
All editions CD and digital download – standard edition
No.	Title	Lyrics	Music	Length
1.	"Oh Boy"	Han Seung-hoon* Lee Sang-ho* Andreas Öhrn* Christian Wahlberg* Carries'M* LITTLE	Han Seung-hoon* Lee Sang-ho* Andreas Öhrn* Christian Wahlberg	3:31
2.	"Heart Attack" (Japanese Version) (胸キュン; "Mune Kyun")	Kang Dong-chul (Brave Brothers)* Chakun* Kanata Nakamura	Brave Brothers * Chakun* Mr. Kang	3:17
3.	"Elvis" (Japanese Version)	Han Seong-ho* UG55	Kim Do-hoon* Lee Sang-ho	3:23
4.	"Joa Yo!" (Japanese Version) (チョアヨ!; "Choa Yo!")	Brave Brothers* Star Wars* Yuya Suzuki	Brave Brothers* Star Wars	4:22
5.	"Luv Me" (Japanese Version)	Brave Brothers* Kanata Nakamura	Brave Brothers* JS	3:32
6.	"Short Hair" (Japanese Version; ショートヘア)	Brave Brothers* Yuya Suzuki	Brave Brothers* Elephant Kingdom	3:37
7.	"Lemon Slush"	Lee Jin-ho* LITTLE	Lee Jin-ho* Kim Jae-yang* Go Jin-young	3:13
8.	"Like a Cat" (Japanese Version)	Brave Brothers* TomoMi	Brave Brothers* Chakun* JS	3:41
9.	"You Know That" (Japanese Version)	Brave Brothers* Star Wars* Meg.me	Brave Brothers* Star Wars	3:25
10.	"Stay with Me"	Kim Jae-yang* Kanata Nakamura	Kim Jae-yang* Park Hyun-woo	3:19
11.	"Miniskirt" (Japanese Version; ミニスカート)	Brave Brothers* Chakun* Carries'M	Brave Brothers* Chakun* Elephant Kingdom	3:01

Limited edition "type A" DVD track listing
No.	Title	Length
1.	"Miniskirt" (Japanese Version; music video)	3:02
2.	"Like a Cat" (Japanese Version; music video)	5:20
3.	"Heart Attack" (Japanese Version; music video)	5:07
4.	"Oh BOY" (Music Video)
5.	"Oh BOY" (Music Video) (Dance Version)
6.	"Oh BOY" (music video and jacket making film)
7.	"AOA Log-in Tokyo #7"
8.	"AOA Log-in Tokyo 'Heart Attack' Digest"

== Charts ==
Chart (2015)	Peak position
Japanese Weekly Albums (Oricon)	2
Japanese Weekly Top Albums (Billboard)	1

== Release history ==
Region	Date	Format	Label	Edition(s)
Japan	October 14, 2015	CD + DVD	Universal Music Japan, Delicious Deli Records	Limited edition (type A)
Japan	October 14, 2015	CD + Desk Calendar	Universal Music Japan, Delicious Deli Records	Limited edition (type B)
Japan	October 14, 2015	CD	Universal Music Japan, Delicious Deli Records	Limited picture label member editions, regular edition
Japan	October 14, 2015	Digital download	Universal Music Japan, Delicious Deli Records	Regular edition
