= Good Luck (AOA song) =

2016 single by AOA

- Japanese regular and digital edition cover

Single by AOA

from the album Good Luck and Runway
- B-side: "10 Seconds"; "Really Really" (Japanese)
- Released: May 16, 2016 (Korean); August 3, 2016 (Japanese)
- Genre: Electropop; dance-pop
- Length: 3:08
- Label: FNC; LOEN; Virgin; Universal Music
- Composers: Matthew Tishler; Aaron Benward; Felicia Barton
- Lyricists: Han Sung-ho; Jang Yeon-jung; Innovator; Hasegawa
- Producers: Matthew Tishler; Aaron Benward; Felicia Barton

AOA Korean singles chronology
"Heart Attack" (2015)	"Good Luck" (00000002)	"Excuse Me" (2017)

AOA Japanese singles chronology
"Give Me the Love" (2016)	"Good Luck" (2016)

Music video
- "Good Luck (Japanese version)" on YouTube

Music video
- "Good Luck" on YouTube

"Good Luck" is a song recorded by South Korean girl group AOA for their fourth extended play of the same name (2016). It was released as the title track from the EP by FNC Entertainment and distributed by LOEN Entertainment on May 16, 2016 in conjunction with the mini-album. The lyrics were written by Han Seong-ho, Jang Yeon-jeong and Innovators and the music was composed by Matthew Tishler, Aaron Benward and Felicia Barton. To promote the song and the EP, AOA performed "Good Luck" on several South Korean music programs, including Music Bank, Show! Music Core and Inkigayo. A music video for the title track was also released on May 16. The song was a commercial success peaking at number 2 on the Gaon Digital Chart. It has sold over 545,952 digital copies as of July 2016.

"Good Luck" was remade as a Japanese song for the group's the fifth single titled, "Good Luck," from their second Japanese studio album Runway (2016). It was released by Universal Music Japan on August 3, 2016. The single was released in eleven different physical versions and as a digital download in Japan.

== Composition ==
"Good Luck" was described as a brassy, slow-burning pop track by Fuse. Adding that the release it's a "nice change for the group, which is boasting a fresh-feeling sound to showcase new textures of their voices".

== Background and release ==
=== Korean version ===
"Good Luck" was released as a digital download in conjunction with the release of Good Luck EP in Korean on May 16, 2016.

=== Japanese version ===
On June 6, 2016 it was announced that the Japanese version of "Good Luck" would be released on August 3, 2016 as AOA's fifth physical single with no further details. The pre-orders for the single started on June 9, 2016, at noon JST. On June 21, cover artworks for eleven versions of the single, including Limited Editions Type A/B/C, Regular Edition, and Limited Members Editions, were revealed. On June 24, through the app Line, the group held a live broadcast, in which they discussed the upcoming release, revealing the prices among others details.

On July 25, it was revealed that the Japanese version of "10 Seconds" and "Really Really" would be parts of the single, releasing audio teasers of both songs. On July 27, the pre-orders for the digital single started on iTunes Japan and "Good Luck" was available for pre-release download. The single was officially released on August 3, 2016, as a physical single in eleven versions. All editions come with a random trading card.

== Music video ==
=== Korean version ===
The first music video teaser was released on May 9, 2016 and was titled as "week version", showing the girls working as lifeguards on a beach. The second teaser was released a day later on May 10 and was titled as "weekend version", showing the girls happy while walking on the street. The third and final teaser was released on May 12 and show short clips of the group dancing along with close-up of each member.

The official music video was released on May 16 through the group's official YouTube channel and on 1theK channel, surpassing the 20 million views in conjunction since the release. The music video took place on Guam and show the girls working as lifeguards on the coast for the week and having fun in a club for the weekend, with clips of the girls dancing in the fire department.

=== Japanese version ===
On June 30, 2016, Universal Music Japan released the short version of the Japanese music video on their official YouTube channel, revealing for the first time the audio and the new version of the song.

The official music video for the Japanese version was released on August 3, through the group official Vevo account. The music video uses the same theme shown in the Korean version, with new close-up shots and outfit for each member and additional footage never seen before of the girls at the beach and in the club.

== Chart performance ==
=== Korean version ===
"Good Luck" entered and peaked at number 2 on the Gaon Digital Chart on the chart issue dated May 15–21, 2016 with 170,905 downloads sold – topping the componing Download Chart – and 3,317,390 streams. In its second and third week, the song stayed in the Top 10 of the chart. The song stayed in the Top 100 for thirteenth consecutive weeks since the release.

The song charted at number 12 on the Gaon Digital Chart for the month of May 2016 with 286,674 downloads sold and 7,792,066 streams. For the month of June 2016 the song placed at number 19 with 162,398 downloads sold and 9,585,124 streams. For the month of July 2016 the song placed at number 55 with 96,880 downloads sold and 5,258,241 streams, charting for three consecutive months.

=== Japanese version ===
"Good Luck" debuted at number 4 on the Oricon Daily Singles Chart for August 2, 2016. In its second and third day of sales, the single stayed in the Top 10. In its fourth consecutive day, the single charted at number 2, topping the chart for two consecutive days on August 6 and August 7.

It was reported that "Good Luck" sold nearly 38,900 copies in Japan in the first week, debuting and peaking at number 3 on the Oricon Weekly Singles Chart. The single has sold a total of 39,778 copies as of October 2016.

== Promotion ==
=== Korean version ===
In order to promote the song and the mini-album, the group performed "10 Seconds" and "Good Luck" on several South Korean music programs in the first week of promotions. On May 17, the group held their first comeback stage on SBS MTV's The Show, followed by MBC MUSIC's Show Champion, Mnet's M Countdown, KBS's Music Bank, MBC's Show! Music Core and SBS's Inkigayo on May 18, 19, 20, 21 and 22 respectively.

On May 24, the group took the first trophy for first place for "Good Luck" on The Show and on May 25, the group took the second trophy, this time on Show Champion.

The group abruptly ended promotions after only two weeks of performances stating schedules conflicts.

=== Japanese version ===
AOA first performed the Japanese version of "Good Luck" in their second Japan concert tour titled, AOA Summer Concert in Japan ~Angels World 2016~, on July 1 and July 3, 2016.

== Controversy ==
Shortly after the release, the music video for "Good Luck" became unavailable. It was re-uploaded on their YouTube channel with edited parts.

FNC Entertainment stated saying "excluding the vehicles, we admit that other products in the music video were included as product placement. The vehicles, however, were merely borrowed due to the local situation and we had no intention to show [the brand]."

=== Music Bank trophy vote investigation ===
On May 27, 2016, AOA received the third trophy for first place for the song on Music Bank, winning against Twice's "Cheer Up", generating public doubt for the final score obtained. Two days later, on May 29, producers from the show admitted the mistake, stating that the person in charge of calculating the scores made an error on the excel sheet, revealing that AOA took second place for the last week of May. The trophy was not taken away by the show.

== Track listing and formats ==
- Digital download
1. "Good Luck" – 3:08
- Digital download
1. "Good Luck" (Japanese version) – 3:08
- Japan CD single – limited type A/B/C and regular editions / digital download EP
1. "Good Luck" (Japanese version) – 3:08
2. "10 Seconds" (Japanese version) – 3:55
3. "Really Really" (Japanese version) – 3:53
4. "Good Luck" (karaoke version) (Japanese version) – 3:08
5. "10 Seconds" (instrumental) – 3:54
6. "Really Really" (instrumental) – 3:54
- Japan CD single – limited picture label member editions
1. "Good Luck" (Japanese version) – 3:08
2. "10 Seconds" (Japanese version) – 3:55
- Japan CD Single – limited edition "type A" DVD track listing
1. "Good Luck" (Japanese version; music video)
2. "Good Luck" (making of music video)
3. Special Features: Lifesaving Lessons
- Japan CD single – limited edition "type B" DVD track listing
1. "Good Luck" (Japanese version; music video)
2. "Good Luck" (making of Jacket Photos)
3. Special Features: Handmade Accessories

== Charts ==
=== Korean version ===
==== Weekly charts ====
Chart (2016)	Peak position
South Korea (Gaon Digital Chart)	2

==== Monthly charts ====
Chart (2016)	Peak position
South Korea (Gaon Digital Chart)	12

=== Japanese version ===
==== Oricon ====
Chart	Peak position	Sales
Oricon Daily Singles Chart	1	39,778+
Oricon Weekly Singles Chart	3	39,778+
Oricon Monthly Singles Chart	16	39,778+

== Release history ==
Region	Date	Format	Versions	Label	Edition(s)
Korea	May 16, 2016	Digital download	Korean version	LOEN Entertainment, FNC Entertainment	Released in conjunction with Good Luck EP
Japan	July 27, 2016	Digital download	Japanese version	Universal Music Japan, Virgin Music	Pre-release single
Japan	August 3, 2016	CD + DVD	Japanese version	Universal Music Japan, Virgin Music	Limited editions (type A, type B)
Japan	August 3, 2016	CD + Photobook	Japanese version	Universal Music Japan, Virgin Music	Limited edition (Type C)
Japan	August 3, 2016	CD	Japanese version	Universal Music Japan, Virgin Music	Limited picture label member editions, regular edition
Japan	August 3, 2016	Digital download	Japanese version	Universal Music Japan, Virgin Music	Regular edition
