= Miniskirt (song) =

2014 single by AOA

- Digital edition cover

Single by AOA
- Language: Korean
- Released: January 16, 2014
- Recorded: 2013
- Studio: Brave (Seoul); FNC (Seoul)
- Genre: K-pop; dance-pop; electropop
- Length: 3:00
- Label: FNC
- Composers: Brave Brothers; Chakun; Elephant Kingdom
- Lyricists: Brave Brothers; Chakun
- Producer: Brave Brothers

AOA singles chronology
"Red Motion" (2013)	"Miniskirt" (2014)	"Short Hair" (2014)

Music video
- "Miniskirt" on YouTube

"Miniskirt"
- Type B and digital edition cover

Single by AOA

from the album Ace of Angels
- Language: Japanese
- B-side: "Short Hair" (Japanese); "Get Out" (Original version)
- Released: October 1, 2014
- Recorded: 2014
- Studio: Brave (Seoul); FNC (Seoul)
- Genre: J-pop; dance-pop; electropop
- Length: 3:02
- Label: Universal Music
- Composers: Brave Brothers; Chakun; Elephant Kingdom
- Lyricist: Carrie's M
- Producer: Brave Brothers

AOA Japanese singles chronology
"Miniskirt" (2014)	"Like a Cat" (2015)

Music video
- "Miniskirt (Japanese version)" on YouTube

"Miniskirt" (Korean: 짧은 치마; RR: Jjalbeun chima) is a song by South Korean girl group AOA, serving as the lead single for the group's fifth single album of the same name. Written and produced by Brave Brothers, it was released physically and digitally on January 16, 2014 by FNC Entertainment. Member Youkyung didn’t participate in the single album release due to the restrictions reasons.

The song was AOA's commercial breakthrough, reaching number 11 on South Korea's Gaon Digital Chart, making it their first top twenty entry. It was the 32nd best-performing single of 2014 in the country and has sold over 1,360,578 digital downloads as of 2015. It also earned AOA their first music show win on February 9, 2014.

A Japanese remake of the song was released as AOA's debut single in Japan on October 1, 2014.

== Release ==
The music video and single were released on January 16. On January 26, AOA released an extended cut music video.

=== Japanese version ===
On July 31, 2014, it was revealed that AOA would be entering the Japanese market on October 1 with a Japanese version of "Miniskirt". On September 7, the short version of the Japanese music video was released. On September 10, the full music video was released.

== Promotion ==
The promotions for the song "Miniskirt" started on January 16, 2014, on M! Countdown. The song was also promoted on the shows Music Bank, Music Core and Inkigayo. On February 9, AOA won their first music show award on Inkigayo. Seolhyun was unable to perform with the group in these performances due to a leg injury.

On July 11, 2014, it was revealed that AOA would be performing at the Japanese music festival A-Nation held on August 17 in Yoyogi National Gymnasium in Tokyo, Japan, as the only girl group from South Korea.

On August 12, 2014, it was confirmed that AOA would perform at "Tokyo Runway 2014" which was held on September 7 at the Makuhari Messe Event Hall. AOA appeared as guest performers.

== Track listing ==
Korean CD single and Digital download
No.	Title	Lyrics	Music	Length
1.	"Gonna Get Your Heart"	Galactika	Galactika	01:01
2.	"Miniskirt" (짧은 치마; Jjalbeun chima)	Brave Brothers	Brave Brothers; Elephant Kingdom; Cha Kun	03:00
3.	"Under the Street Light" (가로등 불 아래서; Garodeung bul araeseo)	Brave Brothers	Brave Brothers; ElephantKingdom	04:00
4.	"Miniskirt" (Instrumental)		Brave Brothers	03:00
Total length:				11:01

Japanese limited edition "Type A, B" CD and Digital download
No.	Title	Lyrics	Music	Length
1.	"Miniskirt" (ミニスカート (Minisukāto) (Japanese version))	Brave Brothers; Carries'M	Brave Brothers; Elephant Kingdom; Cha Kun	3:02
2.	"ショートヘア" (ショートヘア (Shōtohea) (Japanese version))	Brave Brothers; Yuya Suzuki	Brave Brothers; Elephant Kingdom	3:37
3.	"GET OUT" (Original Ver.)	Choi Young Don	Kim Do Hoon; Lee Sang Ho	3:34
4.	"ミニスカート" (Miniskirt) (Karaoke Ver.)		Brave Brothers	3:01
5.	"ショートヘア" (Short Hair) (Karaoke Ver.)		Brave Brothers	3:36
6.	"GET OUT" (Inst.)		Kim Do Hoon; Lee Sang Ho	3:34

Japanese limited edition "Type A" CD+DVD
No.	Title	Length
1.	"Miniskirt" (Japanese Ver.)
2.	"Miniskirt" (Japanese Ver. making)
3.	"Miniskirt" (Korean Ver.)
4.	"Short Hair" (Korean Ver.)
5.	"Bonus video"

== Charts ==
=== Weekly charts ===
Chart	Peak position
Gaon Digital Chart	11
Gaon Album Chart	9
Gaon Mobile Chart	27
Gaon Social Chart	1
Billboard K-Pop Hot 100	8

=== Year-end charts ===
Chart (2014)	Position	Notes
Gaon Digital chart	32	
Gaon Download chart	23	1,104,681 downloads

=== Oricon chart ===
Chart	Peak position	Sales
Daily Singles Chart	3	12,233+
Weekly Singles Chart	13	12,233+
Monthly Singles Chart	44	12,233+

=== Sales ===
Chart	Sales
Gaon physical sales	10,356+
