= Angel's Knock =

- Digital and Excuse Me version

Studio album by AOA
- Released: January 2, 2017
- Recorded: 2015–2016
- Genres: Electropop; dance-pop
- Length: 35:02
- Language: Korean
- Labels: FNC; LOEN
- Producer: Han Sung Ho

AOA chronology
Runway (2016)	Angel's Knock (2017)	Bingle Bangle (2018)

Singles from Angel's Knock
- 1. "Excuse Me" Released: January 2, 2017; 2. "Bing Bing" Released: January 2, 2017

Angel's Knock (stylized in all caps) is the third studio album and first official Korean regular album by South Korean girl group AOA. It was released on January 2, 2017, by FNC Entertainment and distributed by LOEN Entertainment through digital and physical platforms. It was their first Korean material since the release of Good Luck.

Double lead singles, "Excuse Me" and "Bing Bing", which represent two distinctive concepts, were released and promoted simultaneously on the music programs during their comeback week. Korean versions of AOA's previous Japanese singles, "Give Me the Love" and "Oh Boy", are also included as tracks 8 and 9 respectively. "Excuse Me" charted at number 22 on the Gaon Digital Chart, while "Bing Bing" debuted and peaked at number 45. The album marked the group's first comeback after the departure of member Youkyung in October 2016. This also marks the final release with member Choa, who departed from the group on June 30, 2017.

The album was a commercial success, peaking at number 3 on the Gaon Album Chart. It has sold 33,655 physical copies as of February 2017.

== Background ==
Angel's Knock is marked their debut Korean studio album and third overall by South Korean girl group AOA, this marks their first comeback since their release of the album Good Luck, it was their first regular album since their fourth anniversary.

=== Announcement and teasers ===
On November 29, 2016, FNC Entertainment first stated that AOA were in the preparation stages with the goal of releasing their debut Korean studio album, which came four-and-a-half years after the group's debut back in July 2012. The group's leader, Shin Jimin, also shared on the official blog that the album will include a song for Elvis, which is the name of the group's fanclub.

On December 21, FNC Entertainment revealed the promotion plan poster for AOA's comeback and promised the album will "show every aspect of AOA’s musical skills accumulated in the past four years." The poster first teases "Another Me" for December 26, "AOA vs. AOA #1" for December 27, "AOA vs. AOA #2" for December 28, "Secret Room" for December 29, and "Magic of Umbrella" for December 30, while the full album, titled Angel's Knock, and promotional music videos will be both released on January 2, 2017. These teasers were revealed on a special web page designed for the group.

On December 23, AOA member, Kim Seol-hyun, posted two teasers on her Instagram account with hashtag #AngelsKnock and #20170102. The caption says "D-10 Another Me Teaser." The short videos are showing Seolhyun in two different styling. The first one is of her wearing a white blouse with minimalist makeup and wavy hair; she's also staring at the camera innocently. The second teaser is of her wearing black blazer, hair slicked back and she's fiercely challenging the camera.

The "Another Me" promotion is a launching film for Angel’s Knock. It again features the group's member Seolhyun. It shows her in two different styles; one seems innocent and pure, while the other is aggressive and fierce. The "AOA vs. AOA #1" and "AOA vs. AOA #2" promotions are teaser images for two album editions of Angel's Knock. The "Secret Room" promotion is a teaser for the music video for the first single "Excuse Me". The music video is set to be in an office. As for the music teased, it is a beat-heavy dance track best played in clubs. The "Magic of Umbrella" promotion is a teaser for the music video for the second single "Bing Bing". The teaser shows "Bing Bing" will be the box set music video featuring dancing.

On December 30, a highlight medley was released to preview all of 10 tracks featured in Angel's Knock.

On December 31, 2016, FNC Entertainment posted motion posters featuring AOA dancing to their double lead singles "Excuse Me" and "Bing Bing" on social networks. "Excuse Me" shows some cute and feminine choreography with the members putting their hands up as they dance. As for "Bing Bing", the members move their hips for a more sensual feel.

On January 1, 2017, FNC Entertainment posted various motion posters featuring all of the members from the singles' music videos on social networks.

== Release and promotion ==
Prior to the official album release, AOA hosted a one-hour comeback countdown show titled Angel's Match on Naver's V – Live Broadcasting platform on January 1, 2017 at 11 p.m. KST.

AOA promoted "Excuse Me" and "Bing Bing" simultaneously on the music programs during their comeback week on M Countdown, Music Bank, Show! Music Core, and Inkigayo from January 5 to January 8 respectively. From January 9 onwards, due to popular demands, they performed "Excuse Me" only instead.

The group also hosted several fansign events in different sites, namely Yongsan, Gimpo, Gangnam, Mokdong Youth Training Center,... from January 6 to January 18.

On January 11, FNC Entertainment announced details for the group's first solo concert in the native country Korea, titled "2017 AOA 1st Concert [Ace of Angels] in Seoul", which will be held on March 11 at Olympic Hall, Olympic Park.

== Singles ==
Double lead singles for the album, "Excuse Me" and "Bing Bing", were released in conjunction with the official release of Angel's Knock on January 2, 2017 at 12 a.m. KST. Both music videos for the lead singles were released on the same date.

The concept of "Excuse Me" is lovely and elegant, while the concept of "Bing Bing" is alluring and sexy. "Excuse Me" is a retro-style dance track with an intense drum beat and bass, and a unique synth sound, which is composed and produced by Brave Brothers who previously produced the group's biggest hits including "Miniskirt", "Like a Cat", and "Heart Attack". While "Bing Bing" is a jazz-influenced dance-pop number with an addictive brass sound and drum beat. On February 10, the group's released a music video for the album track "With Elvis" as a special gift for their fans.

== Formats ==
Angel's Knock was released through digital and physical platforms on January 2, 2017 at 12 a.m. KST. The physical format was made available in two editions, Version A (Excuse Me) and Version B (Bing Bing). Each edition has a distinctive concept and design, but shares the same contents:

- A physical CD set in a 150x150mm package
- A 64-page booklet
- A concept selfie photo card (up to 7)
- A concept photo card (up to 7)
- Seven concept photo postcards
- A concept poster (up to 2)
- A concept event card (up to 2)

== Commercial performance ==
Angel's Knock entered and peaked at number 3 on the Gaon Album Chart on the chart issue dated January 1–7, 2017. In its second week, the album fell to number 10.

The album entered at number 5 on the Billboard's World Album Chart, marked the highest ranking debut album of the week.

The album places at number 6 on the Gaon Album Chart for the month of January 2017 with 32,668 physical copies sold.

== Track listing ==
Angel's Knock track listing
No.	Title	Writer(s)	Producers	Length
1.	"Excuse Me"	Brave Brothers; Chakun	Erik Lidbom; Brave Brothers; Han Sung Ho; Kim Chang Rak	3:44
2.	"Bing Bing" (빙빙; Bingbing)	Han Sung Ho; Chakun; Choi Yung Me (Jam Factory); Davey Nate; Lee Seu Ran (Jam Factory); Lee Ji Eun (Music Cube)	Hyuk Shin; Marco Reyes (Joombas)	3:11
3.	"Three Out"	Shin Jimin; Lee Sang Ho; Park Woo Sang	Lee Sang Ho; Sang	2:59
4.	"Feeling" (느낌이 오니; Neukkimi Oni)	Jimin; Han Sung Ho; Kim Bo Eun (Jam Factory)	Geist; Lena Leon; Aurora Pfeiffer	3:23
5.	"Can't Sleep" (불면증; Bulmyeonjeung)	Brave Brothers	Brave Brothers; Two Champ; Chakun	3:19
6.	"Lily" (featuring Rowoon of SF9)	Shin Agnes; GDLO (Mono Tree)	GDLO (Mono Tree)	4:05
7.	"Melting Love"	Jimin; Lee Ji Soo	Wonderkid; Shin Hyo	3:26
8.	"Help Me"	Jimin; Han Seung Hoon; Lee Sang Ho	Hoon; Lee Sang Ho; Andreas Ohrn; Chris Wahle	3:44
9.	"Oh Boy" (Korean version)	Han Seung Hoon; Lee Sang Ho; InnoVator	Hoon; Lee Sang Ho; Ohrn; Wahle	3:30
10.	"With Elvis"	AOA	Kim Jae Yang	3:34
Total length:				35:02

== Charts ==
=== Weekly charts ===
Chart (2017)	Peak position
South Korean Albums (Gaon)	3
US World Albums (Billboard)	5

== Release history ==
Region	Date	Format	Label
South Korea	January 2, 2017	CD; digital download	FNC Entertainment; LOEN Entertainment
Various	January 2, 2017	Digital download	FNC Entertainment; LOEN Entertainment
Taiwan	February 14, 2017	CD	FNC Entertainment; LOEN Entertainment
