= Brave Brothers =

South Korean rapper (born 1979)

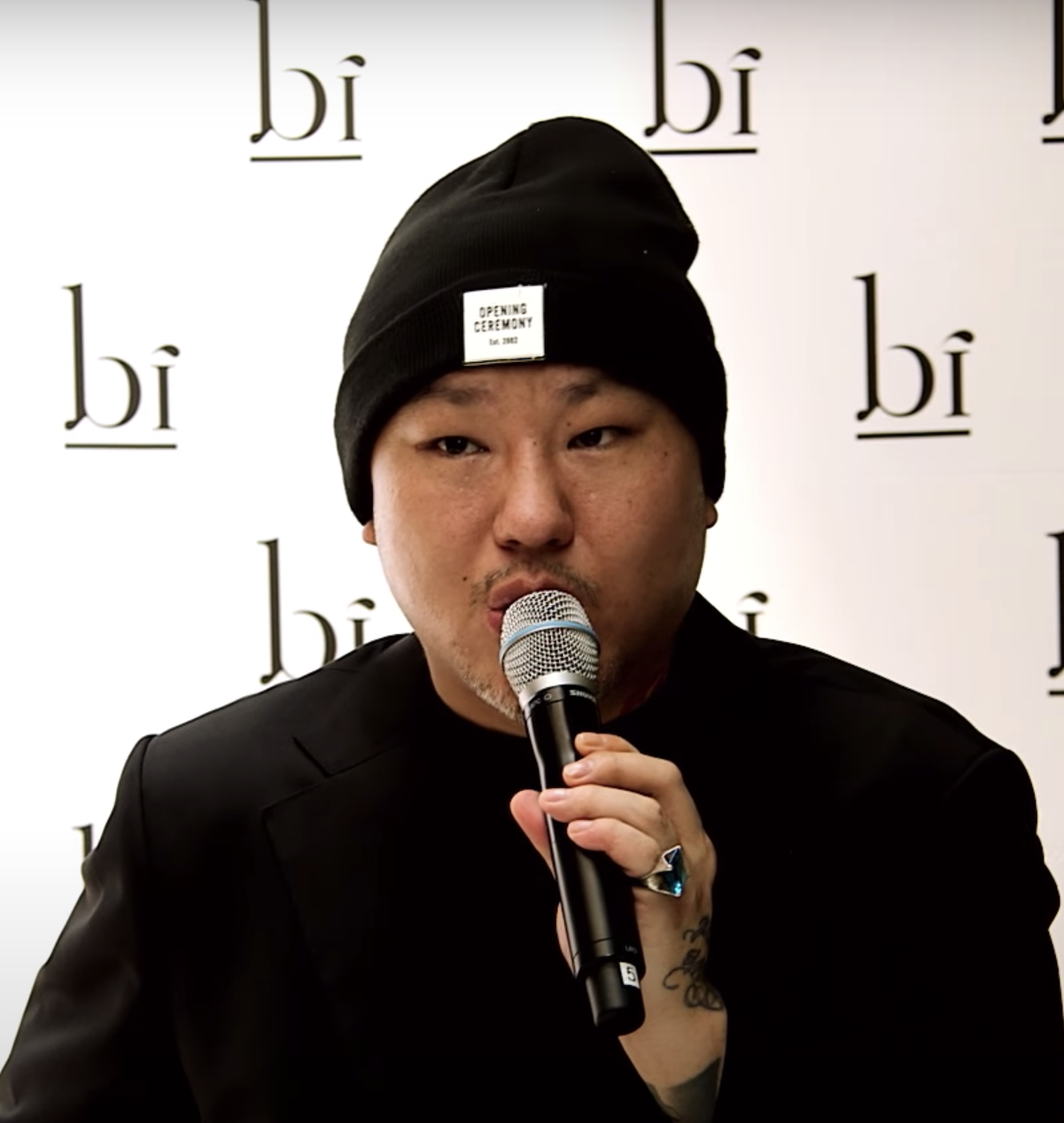
- Brave Brothers in 2016

Background information
- Born: Kang Dong-chul; June 7, 1979 (age 47)
- Origin: South Korea
- Genres: Hip hop; electronica; dance; R&B
- Occupations: Rapper; songwriter; record producer
- Years active: 2002–present
- Labels: YG; Brave
- Website: Brave Entertainment

Korean name
- Hangul: 강동철
- RR: Gang Dongcheol
- MR: Kang Tongch'ŏl

Stage name
- Hangul: 용감한 형제
- Hanja: 勇敢한 兄弟
- RR: Yonggamhan Hyeongje
- MR: Yonggamhan Hyŏngje

Kang Dong-chul (Korean: 강동철, born June 7, 1979), also known by his stage name Brave Brothers, is a South Korean rapper, record producer and songwriter for Brave Entertainment. He was a producer and composer for YG Entertainment from 2004 to 2008. In 2008, he started his own record label called Brave Entertainment. He has produced hit songs for After School, Sistar, 4Minute, T-ara, Son Dam Bi, Big Bang, Brown Eyed Girls, AOA, Hello Venus, RANIA and U-KISS. In 2009, he made his music debut with Attitude and later released Passionate on December 8. His label manages acts such as Electroboyz, BIGSTAR, and DKB. Kang was a judge panelist on JTBC's Made In U program in 2011.

== Music career ==
On October 21, representatives of RaNia revealed that Brave Brothers would be producing their album Time To Rock Da Show. He was awarded the Hallyu Composer Award at the 19th Korean Culture Entertainment Daesang Awards on December 15, 2011. He stated, "Thank you so much for honoring me with such a great award. I will return the favor with more great new songs. I would like to return this honor to the artists that express my songs and to the Brave Sound family.

== Business career ==
On October 25, 2011, he opened a hip hop club in the Gangnam district of Seoul called Phantom.

== Personal life ==
On KBS's Win Win, he revealed he had a troubled past with 12 violence-related crimes and owned a room salon business. He stated that everything changed when he developed a love for Cypress Hill's music and ended his relations with organized crime.

== Discography ==
=== Studio albums ===
Title	Album details	Peak chart positions	Sales
Title	Album details	KOR	Sales
The Classic	Released: September 3, 2010; Label: Brave Entertainment; Formats: CD, digital download	11	—N/a

=== Extended plays ===
Title	Album details	Peak chart positions	Sales
Title	Album details	KOR	Sales
Attitude	Released: August 18, 2009; Label: Brave Entertainment; Formats: CD, digital download	—	—N/a
"—" denotes release did not chart. Note: The Gaon Music Chart was established in 2010.

=== Singles ===
Title	Year	Peak chart positions	Album
Title	Year	KOR	Album
"Invisible" feat. Son Dam-bi, Galactika	2009	—	Attitude
"Finally" feat. U-Kiss	2009	—	Passionate single album
"Sad Music" (슬픈음악) with V.O.S	2010	14	Non-album single
"I Want to Cry" (울고 싶단 말야) with Jay Park	2010	5	The Classic
"Draw You" (너를 그린다) with Davichi, Electroboyz	2010	11	The Classic
"Beautiful Girl" with T-ara, feat. Electroboyz	2011	23	Non-album singles
"Break Up" with Lee Gi-kwang, Electroboyz	2011	34	Non-album singles
"Morning Noon Evening" (아침 점심 저녁) with Galactika, Maboos	2015	—	Non-album singles
"—" denotes release did not chart. Note: The Gaon Music Chart was established in 2010.

== Music credit ==
Artist(s)	Song Information
4Minute	"이름이 뭐예요?/What's Your Name?" – Name Is 4Minute; "물 좋아/Is It Poppin'?"; "오늘 뭐해/Whatcha Doin' Today?" – 4Minute World; "살만찌고/Only Gained Weight" – Brave Brothers 10th Anniversary
4 Tomorrow	"두근두근 Tomorrow" – 두근두근 Tomorrow
45RPM	"못 말리는 삼형제" – Hit Pop; "천하무적 야구단" – 천하무적 야구단
A-Force	"Wonder Woman"
After School	"Play Girlz", "AH", "나쁜놈" – New Schoolgirl; "Diva" – Diva; "너 때문에" – Because of You; "8 Hot Girl", "첫사랑" – First Love; "Week" – Brave Brothers 10th Anniversary
After School Red	"밤 하늘에" – RED
Apink BnN	"My Darling" – Yoon Bo-mi & Kim Nam-joo - Brave Brothers 10th Anniversary
AOA	"Intro (Gonna Get Your Heart)", "짧은 치마/Miniskirt", "Under the Street Lights" – Miniskirt; "단발머리/Short Hair", "Joa YO!", "Soulmate", "You Know That" – Short Hair; "AOA", "사뿐사뿐/Like A Cat", "Girl's Heart" – Like A Cat; "심쿵해/Heart Attack", "Luv Me", "One Thing", "Really Really" – Heart Attack; "Excuse Me" – Angel's Knock
Bae Seul-ki	"Intro", "Tiresome" (Feat. Ha Joo Yeon of Jewelry), "DJ" (Feat. Maboos)
Battle	"Big Change (Feat. Deegie)", "Step By Step", "Luv U" – Step By Step
Bestie	"연애의 조건/Love Options" – Love Options
Bigflo	"거꾸로/Upside Down" – emphas!ze
Big Bang	"Intro (Put Your Hands Up)" – Big Bang (single album); "Intro (Victory)", "Good Bye Baby" – Bigbang 03'; "Shake It (Feat. Ji Eun)" – Bigbang Vol.1; "없는 번호/Wrong Number", "Oh Ma Baby" – Always; "Crazy Dog", "마지막 인사/Last Farewell" – Hot Issue; "Wonderful" – Remember
Boyfriend	"Let's Get It Started (Feat. Maboos)", "Boyfriend", "You & I" – Boyfriend
Brave Girls	"Intro (Ain't Nobody Like Brave Girls)", "So Sexy", "아나요" – The Difference; "툭하면 (Feat. Skul1)", "비가 내리면" – Back To Da Future; "변했어" – 변했어; "롤린 (Rollin')" – Rollin' - The Fourth Mini Album; "치맛바람 (Chi Mat Ba Ram)" – Summer Queen - The Fifth Mini Album
Brown Eyed Girls	"어쩌다" – My Style
BtoB	"Beep Beep" – Beep Beep
C-REAL	"C-Real Intro", "No No No No No" – Round 1
Dal Shabet	"너 같은/Someone Like U" – Naturalness
DKB	"Sorry Mama" – YOUTH; "오늘도 여전히 (still)", "Curious" – LOVE; "Work Hard" – GROWTH
DJ Doc	"투게더" – 풍류
Dazzling Red	"This Person" – Idol Group
EI	"Intro", "기억해", "너 하나만" – 기억해
Electroboyz	"전화가 오네 (Feat. 호란)", "어젯밤 (Feat. 별들의전쟁)" – Electroboyz First Single; "Ma Boy 2 (Feat. Hyorin of Sistar)" – Rebirth
F-ve Dolls	"입술자국/Lip Stain", "잘났어" – Charming Five Girls
Gummy	"거울을 보다가", "여기까지만 (Feat. Skull)" – Comfort
Han Yuna	" 마네킹 (Feat. Maboos)" – I'm Mannequin
Hello Venus	"끈적끈적/Sticky Sticky", "위스키/Whisky" – Sticky Sticky; "Wiggle Wiggle" – Wiggle Wiggle; "난 예술이야/I'm Ill", "Show Window", "Watcha Talk About", "Chameleon" – I'm Ill
Hyolyn	"너 밖에 몰라/One Way Love" – LOVE & HATE
Hyomin	"Nice Body feat. LOCO", "Fake It" – MAKE UP
Hyuna	"Ice Cream" – Melting
Jang Keun-suk & Hyolyn of Sistar	"Magic Drag"
Jo Sungmo	"Intro ", "바람필래", "이밤이 지나가면", "점점더 (Feat. Electroboyz)" – Meet Brave
Kim Dong-wan	"Secret" – (Tiffany of Girls' Generation)
Kim Hyung-jun	"Midnight Passes" – Lie To Me OST
Kim Yuna, Sistar & Electroboyz	"Super Girl"
Lee Ai	"기억해" – 기억해
Lee Gi-kwang	"Dancing Shoes", "Wipe the Tears" – First Episode: A New Hero
Lee Min-woo	"남자를 믿지마" (Feat. Big Tone) – M Rizing
Lee Seung-gi	"Losing My Mind" – 정신이 나갔었나봐
Lexy	"눈물 씻고 화장하고" – Lextacy; "하늘 위로 (Feat. 지은)", "Big Lexy" – Rush
Masta Wu	"울라라라 (Feat. Red Roc)", "Cry (Feat. 이영현)", "껌 (Feat. Teddy Park)" – Mass Wu Pt.2
Myname	"Just That Little Thing" – The 2nd Single
Nine Muses	"잠은 안오고 배는 고프고/Sleepless Night" – Lost (Til The Night Is Over)
NS Yoon-G	"N To The S 윤지", "춤을 춰/Lets Dance", "DJ Don't Stop" – Time To Fly High
Oh Jong-hyuk	"Get Away" (Feat. Showgun) – OK, I'm Ready
One Two	"별이 빛나는 밤에" – 별이 빛나는 밤에; "와랄라 랄라레" – Walala Lalale; "Very Good"
Park Bom	"Spring" (Feat. Sandara Park); "4:44" (Feat. Wheein)
Owl	"In the summer" (Feat. Lady Owl)
RaNia	"Time To Rock Da Show", "Pop Pop Pop", "Goodbye" – Time To Rock Da Show
Red Roc	"Bounce Back" – Hello
Samuel	"ONE (feat. Jung Il-hoon of BtoB)"
Se7en	"Interlude – Follow Me", "Run (feat. G-Dragon, Taeyang)" – 24/SE7EN; "Oh~Ma Girl" – Se7olution
Sistar	"Here We Come", "Push Push", "Oh Baby" – Push Push; "We Never Go Alone"; "Drop The Beat (Feat. B2K)", "가식걸/Shady Girl" – Shady Girl; "Mighty Sistar", "Over", "니까짓게/How Dare You" – How Dare You; "Ma Boy"; "Let's Get The Party Started", "So Cool" – So Cool; "Hot Place (feat. Brave Sound)"; "Come Closer", "나혼자/Alone" – Alone; "Sistar19", "있다 없으니까/Gone Not Around Any Longer", "A Girl in Love" – Gone Not Around Any Longer
Son Dam-bi	"Bad Boy" – Mini Album Vol. 1; "미쳤어/Crazy" – Mini Album Vol. 2; "토요일밤에/Saturday Night" – Type B — Back To 80's; "눈물이 주르륵/Dripping Tears" – Dripping Tears
Son Dam-bi & After School	"Amoled"
SPEED	"통증/Pain, the Love of Heart" – Blow Speed
Stellar	"Intro", "펑펑울었어/Cry" – Cry
Sugarless	"노세 놀아보세" – 무가당; "O.A.O (오.에.오)" – O.A.O (오.에.오)
Sunmi	"Full Moon" – Full Moon
Supernova	"Intro", "그리운 날에", "라라라" – Time To Shine; "Intro", "Shining☆Star", "Love Letter" – Shining☆Star; "Stupid Love" – Stupid Love
Taeyang	"Intro (Hot)" – Hot
T-ARA	"완전 미쳤네/So Crazy", "For You" – So Good; "내 이름은/What's My Name" – What's My Name
Teen Top	"Teen Top", "미치겠어/Going Crazy", "Where's Ma Girl", "Girl Friend" – It's; "aRtist", "To You", "Baby U", "Shake It" – aRtisT; "Be Ma Girl", "Fall in Love", "Party Tonight" – Be Ma Girl; "So Sweet", "Get Crazy", "긴 생머리 그녀/Miss Right" – No.1; "Walking By..." – No.1 Repackaged; "Don't I", "Rocking" – Teen Top Class; "나만 빼고/Except for me" – Brave Brothers 10th Anniversary; "재밌어?/Love Is" – High Five
Thelma Aoyama	"Intro", "Fallen Angel", "My Sweetest Sin" – Love Story
Touch	"난" – Touch
uBEAT	"있을 때 잘해 줄 걸/Should Have Treated You Better", "It's Been A Long Time" – 있을 때 잘해 줄 걸
U-Kiss	"Intro (Pump Pump)", "어리지 않아", "Give It to Me" – New Generation; "Intro (On Fire)", "니가 좋아", "Talk To Me" – Bring It Back 2 Old School; "Intro", "만만하니/ManManNaNi", "OK!" – ContiUKiss; "Intro", "빙글빙글/Round&Round", "Without You", "뭐라고" – Only One
Uni.T	"난말야/I Mean"
YG	"Cash Money" (Feat. Krayzie Bone)"
YMGA	"Let It Play (Feat. Ji Eun)"; "Real Talk (Feat. Taeyang)"; Made In R.O.K
Yoo Seung-chan	"How are yoo?"
ZE:A	"하루종일/All Day Long (Original Ver.)" – Leap For Detonation; "숨소리/Breathe" – First Homme

== Awards ==
Year	Award	Category	Result	Ref.
2011	19th Korean Culture Entertainment Daesang Awards	Hallyu Composer	Won	

== See also ==
- Park Jin-young
- Yang Hyun-suk
- Lee Soo-man
