= Heart Attack (EP) =

EP by AOA
- Released: June 22, 2015
- Recorded: 2015
- Genres: K-pop; electropop; dance-pop
- Length: 20:34
- Label: FNC
- Producer: Brave Brothers

AOA chronology
Like a Cat (2014)	Heart Attack (2015)	Ace of Angels (2015)

Singles from Heart Attack
- 1. "Heart Attack" Released: June 22, 2015

Heart Attack is the third extended play by South Korean girl group AOA, released on June 22, 2015 by FNC Entertainment. The song of the same name was used as the lead single for the album.

== Singles ==
The song "Heart Attack" was written and composed by Brave Brothers.

The first music video teaser was released on June 14, 2015 with the second teaser released on June 16. AOA are dressed as lacrosse players in their teasers.

AOA started their Korean promotions with a showcase on June 22 at AX Korea. The promotion of "Heart Attack" began June 25 on the show M! Countdown. The song was also promoted on the shows, Music Bank, Music Core and Inkigayo.

They won their first music show for "Heart Attack" on July 1 on Show Champion.

=== Japanese and Chinese versions ===
On June 17, 2015, it was revealed that AOA would release a Japanese and Chinese version of "Heart Attack". "Heart Attack" was released in Chinese on July 31, 2015 through Baidu Music, Sina Music, QQ Music and Taiwan's KKBOX.

The Japanese version was released in Japan as a single on July 29, 2015 and AOA filmed a separate music video for it. The single was released in eleven different versions: two limited CD+DVD editions, two limited CD+Photobook editions and seven limited CD only editions, one edition per member.

== Track listing ==
Korean EP and Digital download
No.	Title	Lyrics	Music	Arrangement	Length
1.	"Heart Attack" (심쿵해; Simkunghae)	Brave Brothers, Chakun	Brave Brothers, Mr.Kang, Chakun	Brave Brothers, Elephant Kingdom, Lee Jeongmin	03:16
2.	"Luv Me"	Brave Brothers	Brave Brothers, JS	Elephant Kingdom, Lee Jeongmin	03:30
3.	"Come to Me" (들어와; Deureowa)	Shin Jimin, Han Sungho, Seo Youngbae	Han Sungho, Seo Youngbae	Seo Youngbae	03:24
4.	"One Thing" (한개; Han Gae)	Brave Brothers, Chakun	Brave Brothers, Galactika	Galactika	03:21
5.	"Really Really" (진짜; Jinjja)	Brave Brothers, Chakun	Brave Brothers, Elephant Kingdom	Elephant Kingdom, Lee Jeongmin	03:56
6.	"Chocolate"	Galactika	Galactika, Miss Lee	Miss Lee	03:08
Total length:					20:34

Japanese limited edition "Type A, B" CD and Digital download
No.	Title	Lyrics	Music	Arrangement	Length
1.	"Heart Attack" (胸キュン; Mune Kyun Japanese Version)	Brave Brothers, Chakun	Brave Brothers, Mr.Kang, Chakun	Brave Brothers, Elephant Kingdom, Lee Jeongmin	03:16
2.	"Confused" (ゆれる; Yureru Japanese Version)	Brave Brothers, Chakun	Brave Brothers, Mr.Kang, Chakun	Brave Brothers, Elephant Kingdom, Lee Jeongmin	03:43
3.	"Joa Yo!" (チョアヨ!; Choa Yo! Japanese Version)	Brave Brothers, Star Wars	Brave Brothers, Star Wars		04:19
4.	"Heart Attack" (Karaoke Version)		Brave Brothers, Mr.Kang, Chakun	Brave Brothers, Elephant Kingdom, Lee Jeongmin	03:16
5.	"Confused" (Karaoke Version)		Brave Brothers, Mr.Kang, Chakun	Brave Brothers, Elephant Kingdom, Lee Jeongmin	03:43
6.	"Joa Yo!" (Karaoke Version)	Brave Brothers, Star Wars	Brave Brothers, Star Wars		04:19
Total length:					22:36

Japanese limited edition "Member Version" CD
No.	Title	Lyrics	Music	Arrangement	Length
1.	"Heart Attack" (胸キュン; Mune Kyun Japanese Version)	Brave Brothers, Chakun	Brave Brothers, Mr.Kang, Chakun	Brave Brothers, Elephant Kingdom, Lee Jeongmin	03:16
2.	"Joa Yo!" (チョアヨ!; Choa Yo! Japanese Version)	Brave Brothers, Star Wars	Brave Brothers, Star Wars		04:19

Japanese limited edition "Sexy Version: Type A" CD+DVD
No.	Title	Length
1.	"Heart Attack" (Japanese Version)
2.	"Heart Attack" (Japanese Dance Version)
3.	"Confused" (Korean Version)
4.	"Special features" (Heart Attack making video)

Japanese limited edition "Cutie Version: Type A" CD+DVD
No.	Title	Length
1.	"Heart Attack" (Japanese Version)
2.	"Heart Attack" (Japanese Dance Version)
3.	"Confused" (Korean Version)
4.	"Special features" (AOA Japan Diary ♡2015/6/12~14)

== Charts ==
Chart	Peak position
Gaon Album Chart (weekly)	2
Gaon Album Chart (monthly)	6

== Sales and certifications ==
Chart	Amount
Gaon physical sales	45,042+
