= AOA (group) =

South Korean girl group

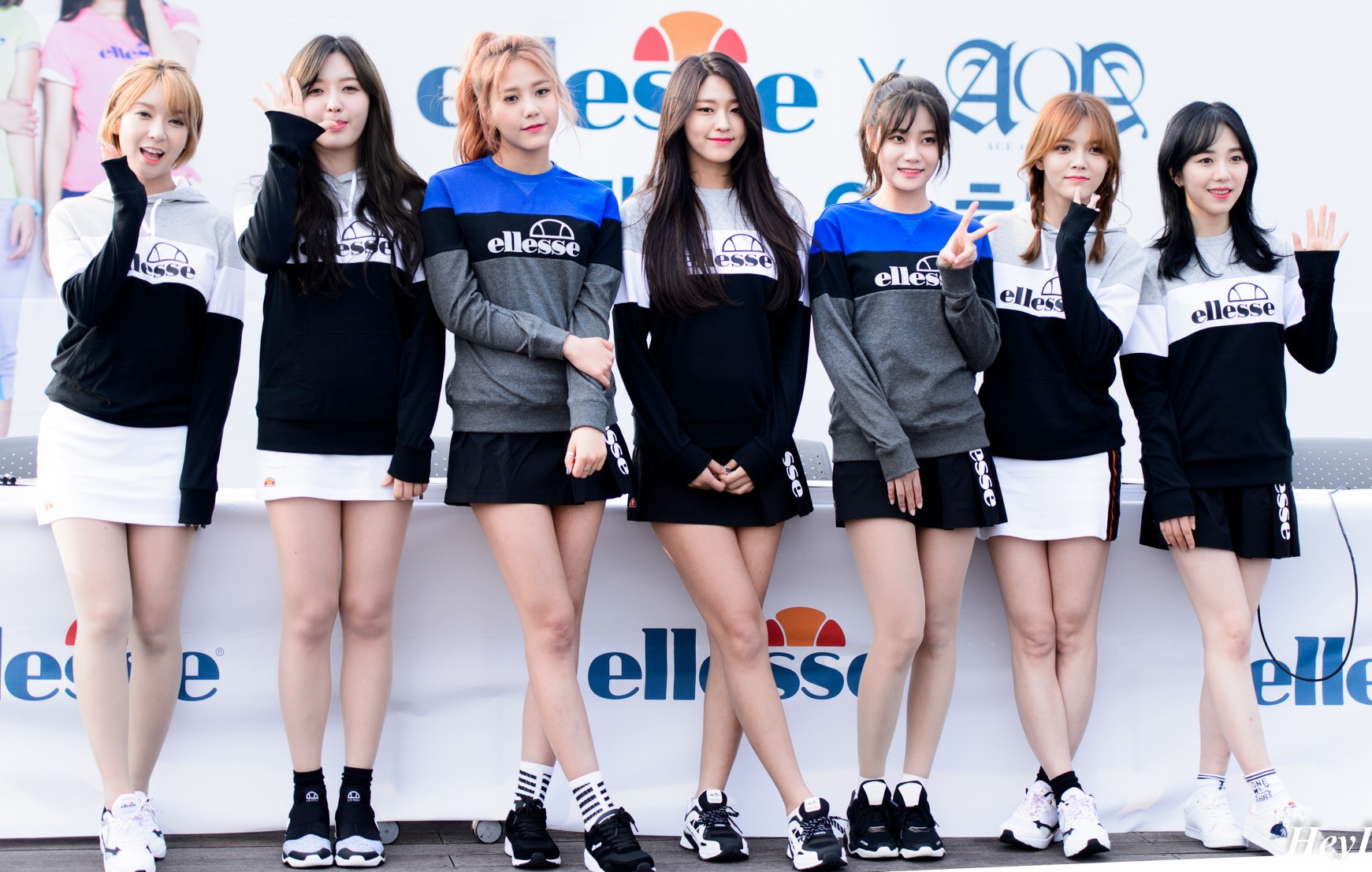
- AOA in 2016; From left to right: Choa, Dohwa, Hyejeong, Seolhyun, Yuna, Jimin, and Mina

Background information
- Origin: Seoul, South Korea
- Genres: K-pop; J-pop; dance-pop; R&B; pop rock
- Years active: 2012–2020
- Labels: FNC; Delicious Deli; Virgin Music
- Spinoffs: AOA Black; AOA White; AOA Cream
- Past members: Choa; Jimin; Yuna; Youkyung; Hyejeong; Mina; Seolhyun; Dohwa (Chanmi)
- Website: fncent.com/aoa

AOA (Korean: 에이오에이; an acronym for Ace of Angels) is a South Korean girl group formed by FNC Entertainment. The original 2012 eight-member line-up included: Choa, Jimin, Yuna, Youkyung, Hyejeong, Mina, Seolhyun, and Dohwa. The group has been inactive (Note: As of 2024, there has been no official announcement of disbandment.) since 2020, following a series of scandals within the group's lineup and the members' departures from FNC.

AOA began their career simultaneously promoting as a dance group and band, and officially debuted in July 2012 with the release of the single album Angel's Story. In early 2013, the band unit AOA Black released their official single titled "MOYA" to moderate success. They released their first EP in June 2014, and that year they also debuted in Japan under Universal Music Japan. The group found nationwide success in 2014 after a series of hit songs that established them as one of the leading girl groups of their era. "Heart Attack" debuted at the top of several charts after its release, became one of the most downloaded songs of 2015, and became one of the longest charting singles on Melon's top 100 chart.

Following a series of consistent success, AOA debuted a second promotional unit, AOA Cream, in 2016. The group would later release their first Korean language studio album in January 2017, and a few months later, held their first headlining Korean concert "Ace Of Angels" at Olympic Hall in Seoul. Among the groups' biggest hits are "Miniskirt", "Short Hair", "Like a Cat", "Heart Attack", "Give Me the Love", "Good Luck", "Excuse Me", and "Bingle Bangle".

== History ==
=== 2012–2013: Formation and debut ===
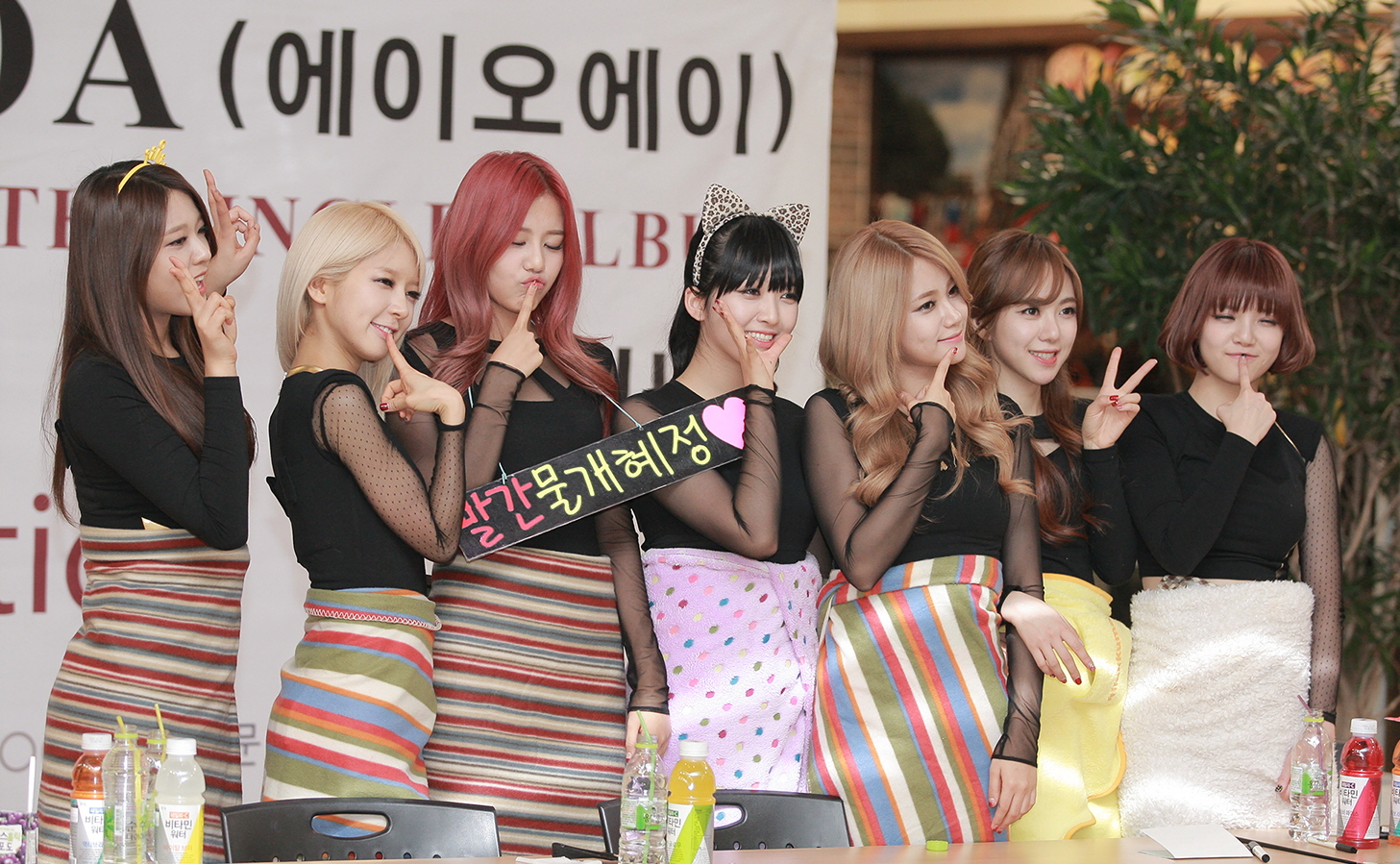
AOA at Gimpo Airport, Seoul, in October 2013

The eight members were introduced individually through teaser photos from July 16 to 23 (in order: Seolhyun, Choa, Hyejeong, Dohwa, Yuna, Mina, Jimin, & Youkyung).

AOA were introduced with a 'transformer' concept, which the group described meant they would promote alternately as a band with various members playing instruments and as a dance group. Explaining the concept of their debut, FNC revealed that seven members are "full angels": Seolhyunari (Seolhyun), Choaya (Choa), Hyejeong.Linus (Hyejeong), Chanmi T.T (Dohwa), Yunaria (Yuna), Minaring (Mina), and leader Jiminel (Jimin), while Youkyung (or "Y") is listed as a "half-angel/half-mortal" as she is only a member when the group promotes as a band, thus they were known as a "7+1" group. The song and music video for their debut title track "Elvis" was released on July 30. The group began promotions with their debut stage on August 9 on M Countdown and then Music Bank on August 10 to minimal success.

Two months after their debut, FNC confirmed that the group would be making a comeback with a second single album "Wanna Be" on October 10. The album cover was released along with the announcement, which depicted the eight members as different fictional characters. Hyejeong, Jimin, Choa, Yuna, Dohwa, Mina, Seolhyun and Youkyung dressed as characters from Kill Bill, Léon, Legally Blonde, Tomb Raider, Harry Potter, Breakfast at Tiffany's, Romeo and Juliet, and The Fifth Element respectively.

In the latter half of 2012, it was confirmed that five-member band unit, AOA Black would perform a stage in the first week of promotions for "Get Out". AOA Black made their first comeback appearance on the October 10 broadcast of KM's Music Triangle and performed the band version of "Get Out" for the first time. The band made their second appearance on the October 12 broadcast of Music Bank.

The following year, on July 11, it was announced that AOA Black would be releasing their debut song, "MOYA". The third single album and "MOYA" music video were released on July 26 and AOA Black had their first comeback stage on KBS Music Bank on the same day. A few months later, the dance group released "Confused," alongside another single album, Red Motion, which was released on October 13 to moderate success. At the end of that year, AOA appeared on FNC Entertainment's reality show "Cheongdam-dong 111," which depicted dramatized scenarios behind the scenes of the entertainment company among its artists, employees and other staff.

=== 2014–2016: Career breakthrough and Japan debut ===
On January 16, AOA released their fifth single and single album, "Miniskirt," which was produced by Brave Brothers, ElephantKingdom and Galactika. Shortly after its release, FNC announced that Seolhyun would sit out promotions for the song after injuring herself. The song went on to be a huge success and peaked at #11 on Gaon Digital Chart and #8 on Billboard K-Pop Hot 100, which garnered them a lot of nationwide attention throughout South Korea and spawned their first hit song. On February 9, the group celebrated their first music show win on Inkigayo.

In March, it was announced that member Seolhyun would make her theatrical debut in the action film, "Gangnam Blues". In May that year, AOA appeared on Real Man to perform their hit song and play a quiz showdown with the soldiers.

The following month, AOA released the single "Short Hair" alongside their first mini album on June 19. The album peaked at #4 on Gaon Weekly Album Chart, and the song at #5 on the Digital Chart and also topped the M Countdown chart in July. The music video ranked eighth on Billboard's "Most Viewed K-pop Videos Around the World" for June. The following month, they released their first photobook, which was accompanied with a behind the scenes video to promote the release.

Due to their rising popularity, AOA released their first Japanese single, a Japanese-language version of their hit song "Miniskirt" on October 1. Soon after, they were chosen as the promotional models for a mobile RPG, 'Fantasy Hero.' In late October, FNC announced that AOA would be having another comeback, and shortly afterwards, began releasing teasers for the music video, unveiling a darker Catwoman concept. The song and music video for Like a Cat were released on November 11, and the music video co-starred Daniel Snoeks. The song was a huge success, peaking at #5 on the Gaon Digital Chart, and ranking #1 on Gaon Social Chart for six consecutive weeks. On November 19, AOA took home their second music show win on Show Champion.

By the end of the year, AOA's rising popularity and nationwide success due to their consecutive hit songs earned them a spot in the top 5 of best-selling girl groups of the year on Gaon.

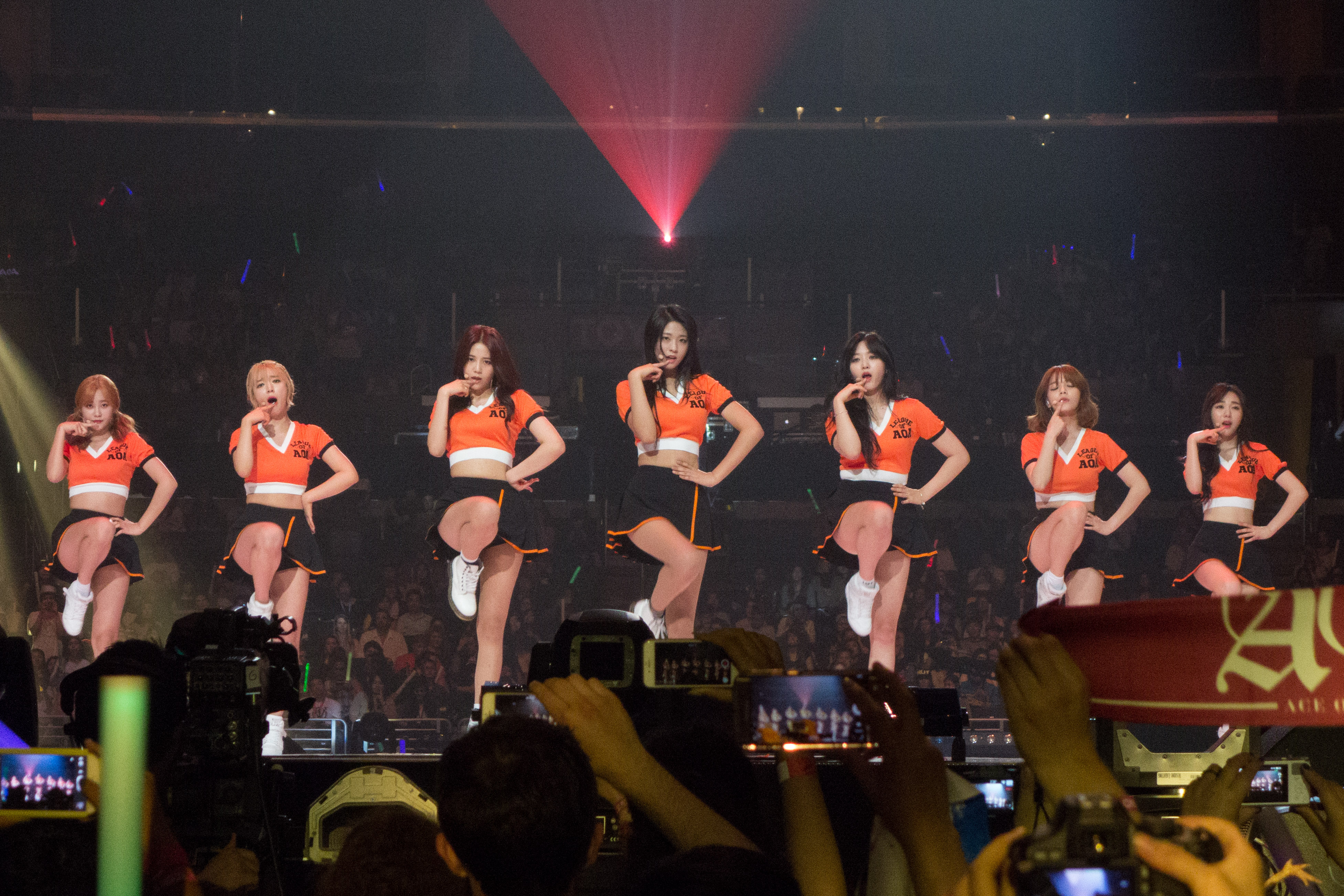
AOA performing at KCON 2015 in Los Angeles

AOA released a Japanese version of Like a Cat on February 25, 2015. The single also came with the Japanese versions of their original Korean songs "Elvis" and "Just the Two of Us". On February 2, FNC released the short version music video of the Japanese version of "Like a Cat", and it ranked No. 1 on Gayp! views daily and weekly ranking. Like a Cat ranked #6 on Oricon Daily Chart and ranked #1 on Tower Records Shibuya on the first day of its release; it also ranked No. 3 as their peak on Oricon Daily Chart.

AOA's first reality show "Open Up! AOA" premiered on February 26 on portal site Naver. The series consisted of 10 episodes, each 10 minutes long, and aired every Thursday. All eight members, including drummer Youkyung, were on the program. AOA started filming their new variety show with MBC Music called AOA One Fine Day in Nanwan Monkey Island, Hainan, China on April 7, 2015. 'One Fine Day' started broadcasting on June 13, 2015.

On June 2, 2015, FNC confirmed the group were preparing for comeback aimed for mid-June. The poster for the group's EP "Heart Attack" was released weeks later, and the song and mini album were released on the 22nd. The group's comeback showcase was held the same day at AX-Hall Seoul. The comeback ended up being a massive success. It peaked at number 2 on Gaon Digital Chart and in the music chart's year-end digital chart, it placed in the top 20 with over one million downloads by the year's end. The song is also reported to be one of the longest charting songs on Melon's music chart.

In August 2015, the group made their first appearances in the United States performing at KCON 2015 in Los Angeles on August 2 and New York on August 8. In the same month, it was revealed that AOA would make a comeback in Japan with a full-length album, being the first full-length album for AOA to release, featuring 8 of their previous Japanese singles and 3 new songs, including the title track, "Oh Boy". This album, Ace of Angels, was later released on October 14, 2015.

Seolhyun was chosen to host the 2015 KBS Entertainment Awards alongside comedian Shin Dong-yup and singer Sung Si-kyung.

=== 2016–2017: Angel's Knock and Choa & Youkyung's departure ===
On January 31, 2016, FNC formed a new sub-unit called AOA Cream, composed of members Yuna, Hyejeong, and Dohwa. They debuted on February 12, 2016, with the title track "I'm Jelly Baby".

On March 3, it was announced that "Give Me the Love", AOA's fourth and first original Japanese single, would be released on April 20. The track list comprised title track "Give Me the Love" featuring Japanese singer Takanori Nishikawa, a Japanese version of "Girl's Heart" and a new original song titled "Still Falls the Rain"

On April 12, AOA aired their reality show "Channel AOA" on OnStyle Live. The group came under widespread scrutiny following their appearance on the reality show when members Jimin and Seolhyun failed to recognize An Jung-geun in a game challenge they had performed on the series. Following the outrage and criticism, the members issued a public apology for their actions. In May 2016, they released their fourth mini-album entitled Good Luck with the lead single of the same name. The song peaked at number 2 on the Gaon Digital Chart and the album sold over 40,000 units.

In October 2016, Youkyung departed from the group following termination of her contract. In her note to fans, she announced she would return to the group as a guest member for any future AOA Black activities. In November, AOA released their second Japanese album Runway, which includes all songs from their previous "Give Me the Love" single.

In January 2017, AOA released their first Korean full-length album titled Angel's Knock with their double titled tracks "Excuse Me" and "Bing Bing". On the Gaon Chart, "Excuse Me" debuted at number #33. The song began rising once they began promotions on music programs, and peaked at #22. Despite this, they achieved three music show wins with the song during its promotions. At the end of promotions, the group announced plans for their first headlining Korean concert.

On June 22, Choa revealed that she had left the group. At first she announced that she would take a break from the industry for health reasons. After medication failed to ameliorate her symptoms, she announced on Instagram that she had made the decision to retire completely. On June 30, the company confirmed that Choa had left the group, and the remaining six members would continue without her. In November, AOA attended an event in Icheon, where they were appointed goodwill ambassadors for the 2018 Winter Olympics.

=== 2018–2019: Bingle Bangle, Mina's departure, Queendom, and New Moon ===
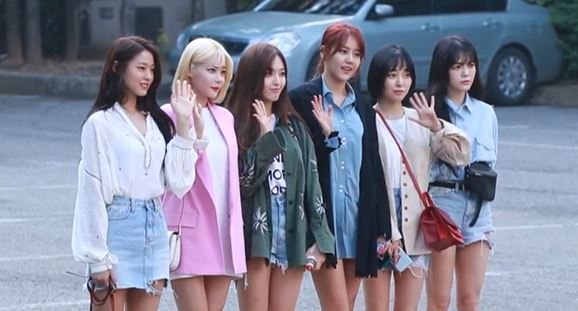
AOA outside KBS New Wing Open Hall to film in June 2018

On May 28, 2018, the group returned with their fifth EP titled Bingle Bangle with a title track of the same name. The album's single peaked at #4 on Gaon Digital Chart and the group received a Bonsang at the Soribada Best K-Music Awards.

In late April 2019, contract negotiations had begun in light of the members' impending contract expiration. FNC responded to reports shortly after stating that contract negotiations with the members were ongoing and discussions about resigning were going positively. On May 13, 2019, the agency announced Mina's departure from the group to pursue her acting career. In the statement the agency confirmed that the group would continue as five members.

In August 2019, AOA joined Mnet's reality survival show Queendom, which saw six female K-pop acts competing in a series of preliminary performances, and in the show's finale, each act would release a final song on the same day to compete for the top spot. The series began airing on August 29, and following the premiere, AOA had begun to receive a lot of positive reception and widespread attention for their appearances on the show. The performance for their cover of Mamamoo's "Egotistic" became a trending topic on Naver, and the digital release of their cover entered many Korean music charts. On October 25, Queendom's six contestants released their final songs on Korean streaming services. AOA released "Sorry," which would be their first official release as five members.

AOA released their sixth EP New Moon with the title track "Come See Me" on November 26, 2019.

=== 2020–2024: Bullying scandal allegations and members' departures from FNC ===
In early July 2020, former member Mina made a series of Instagram posts, in which she alleged that Jimin had bullied her for ten years, driving her to the point of self-harming and attempting suicide. Following the allegations, FNC Entertainment and Jimin issued separate apologies to Mina. On July 4, 2020, Jimin left the group and retired from the entertainment industry entirely due to the scandal and backlash against her.

On January 1, 2021, FNC Entertainment announced that Yuna's contract had expired, and that she would be leaving the company.

On October 20, 2022, it was announced that Seolhyun would also be leaving the company.

On March 15, 2023, Hyejeong moved from FNC to TH Company.

On May 22, 2024, Dohwa announced through her personal social media that she had left FNC Entertainment following the expiration of her contract.

== Members ==
Former

- Choa (초아) – vocals (2012–2017)
- Dohwa (도화) (previously Chanmi (찬미)) – vocals, rap (2012–2024)
- Hyejeong (혜정) – vocals (2012–2023)
- Seolhyun (설현) – vocals (2012–2022)
- Jimin (지민) – leader, vocals, rap (2012–2020)
- Mina (민아) – vocals (2012–2019)
- Youkyung (유경) (2012–2016)
- Yuna (유나) – vocals (2012–2021)

=== Timeline ===
- Green (vertical) = studio album
- Blue (vertical) = extended play album

Sub-units

- AOA Black: Jimin (lead guitar), Yuna (keyboards), Mina (bass), Youkyung (drums, percussion), Choa (rhythm guitar)
- AOA Cream: Yuna, Hyejeong, Dohwa
- AOA White: (Note: Non-promotional sub-unit) Hyejeong, Seolhyun, Dohwa

== Discography ==
Korean albums

- Angel's Knock (2017)

Japanese albums

- Ace of Angels (2015)
- Runway (2016)

== Filmography ==
=== Variety show ===
Year	Title	Korean Title	Ref.
2019	Queendom	퀸덤	

=== Reality series ===
Year	Title	Korean Title	Notes
2013	Cheongdam-dong 111	청담동 111	FNC Ent's reality show
2015	Open-up! AOA	AOA-맴을 열어봐	AOA's first web reality show
2015	AOA – One Fine Day	AOA의 어느 멋진 날	AOA's first reality show
2016	Channel AOA	채널 AOA	AOA's second reality show

== Tours ==
=== Headlining ===
- 2017 AOA 1st Concert [Ace of Angels] in Seoul (2017)

=== Mini concert ===
- 2015 AOA Heart Attack Tour (2015)
- AOA 1st Concert in Japan: Angels World 2015 ~Oh Boy Academy~ (2015)
- AOA Mini Live: Good Luck to Elvis (2016)
- AOA Summer Concert in Japan: Angels World 2016 (2016)

=== Showcases ===
- AOA "Ace of Angels" Debut Showcase (2012)
- AOA Japan Showcase (2013)
- AOA "Like a Cat" Mini Album Showcase (2014)
- AOA "Heart Attack" Comeback Showcase "League of AOA" (2015)
- AOA "Good Luck" Lucky Guard Showcase (2016)
- AOA 5th Mini Album "Bingle Bangle" Showcase (2018)
- AOA 6th Mini Album "New Moon" Showcase (2019)

== Awards and nominations ==
List of awards and nominations received by AOA
Award ceremony	Year	Category	Nominee / work	Result	Ref.
Asia Artist Awards	2016	Best Celebrity Award (Female Group Category)	AOA	Won	
Asia Artist Awards	2018	Brilliant Award	AOA	Won	
Gaon Chart Music Awards	2015	Hot Performance of the Year	AOA	Won	
Gaon Chart Music Awards	2016	World Rookie	AOA	Won	
Gaon Chart Music Awards	2019	Song of the Year – May	"Bingle Bangle"	Nominated	
Golden Disc Awards	2015	Digital Bonsang	"Miniskirt"	Won	
Golden Disc Awards	2016	Digital Disc Daesang	Heart Attack	Nominated	
Golden Disc Awards	2016	Digital Single Daesang	"Heart Attack"	Nominated	
Golden Disc Awards	2016	Digital Bonsang	"Heart Attack"	Won	
Golden Disc Awards	2016	Popularity Award	AOA	Nominated	
Golden Disc Awards	2019	Popularity Award	AOA	Nominated	
Golden Disc Awards	2019	NetEase Most Popular K-pop Star	AOA	Nominated	
KBS World Global Fan Awards	2018	Best Artist (Female)	AOA	Nominated	
Melon Music Awards	2014	Top 10 Artists	AOA	Nominated	
Melon Music Awards	2014	Best Song	"Miniskirt"	Nominated	
Melon Music Awards	2014	Best Dance Piece	"Miniskirt"	Nominated	
Melon Music Awards	2014	Best Music Video	"Miniskirt"	Nominated	
Melon Music Awards	2015	Top 10 Artists	AOA	Nominated	
Melon Music Awards	2015	Best Dance Piece	"Heart Attack"	Nominated	
Mnet Asian Music Awards	2012	Artist of the Year	AOA	Nominated	
Mnet Asian Music Awards	2012	Best New Female Artist	AOA	Nominated	
Mnet Asian Music Awards	2014	Best Dance Performance (Female)	"Miniskirt"	Nominated	
Mnet Asian Music Awards	2014	Union Pay Song of the Year	"Miniskirt"	Nominated	
Mnet Asian Music Awards	2015	Best Female Group	AOA	Nominated	
Mnet Asian Music Awards	2015	Union Pay Artist of the Year	AOA	Nominated	
Mnet Asian Music Awards	2015	Best Dance Performance – Female Group	"Heart Attack"	Nominated	
Mnet Asian Music Awards	2015	Union Pay Song of the Year	"Heart Attack"	Nominated	
Mnet Asian Music Awards	2016	Best Dance Performance (Female)	"Good Luck"	Nominated	
Mnet Asian Music Awards	2016	Hotels Combined Song of the Year	"Good Luck"	Nominated	
Mnet Asian Music Awards	2018	Best Dance Performance (Female)	"Bingle Bangle"	Nominated	
Mnet Asian Music Awards	2018	Song of the Year	"Bingle Bangle"	Nominated	
SBS Gayo Daejeon	2015	Best Promoter Award	AOA	Won	
SBS MTV Best of the Best	2012	Best New Artist	AOA	Nominated	
SBS MTV Best of the Best	2014	Best Female Group	AOA	Nominated	
SBS MTV Best of the Best	2014	Best Sexy Video	"Miniskirt"	Nominated	
Seoul Music Awards	2012	Rookie Award	AOA	Nominated	
Seoul Music Awards	2012	Popularity Award	AOA	Nominated	
Seoul Music Awards	2015	Bonsang Award	"Miniskirt"	Won	
Seoul Music Awards	2015	Daesang Award	"Miniskirt"	Nominated	
Seoul Music Awards	2016	Bonsang Award	AOA	Nominated	
Seoul Music Awards	2016	Popularity Award	AOA	Nominated	
Seoul Music Awards	2019	Bonsang Award	AOA	Nominated	
Seoul Music Awards	2019	Popularity Award	AOA	Nominated	
Seoul Music Awards	2020	Bonsang Award	AOA	Nominated	
Seoul Music Awards	2020	Hallyu Special Award	AOA	Nominated	
Seoul Music Awards	2020	Popularity Award	AOA	Nominated	
Seoul Music Awards	2020	QQ Music Most Popular K-Pop Artist Award	AOA	Nominated	
Soribada Best K-Music Awards	2018	Bonsang Award	AOA	Won	
Soribada Best K-Music Awards	2018	Popularity Award (Female)	AOA	Nominated	
Soribada Best K-Music Awards	2018	Global Fandom Award	AOA	Nominated	

=== Listicles ===
AOA on listicles
Publisher	Year	Listicle	Ranking	Ref.
Forbes	2016	Korea Power Celebrity	20th	
Forbes	2017	Korea Power Celebrity	18th	
Forbes	2018	Korea Power Celebrity	15th	
