= Runway (album) =

- Regular and digital edition cover

Studio album by AOA
- Released: November 30, 2016
- Recorded: 2015–2016
- Genre: Electropop; dance-pop
- Length: 40:04
- Language: Japanese
- Label: Virgin Music; Universal Music
- Producer: Han Sung Ho

AOA chronology
Good Luck (2016)	Runway (2016)	Angel's Knock (2017)

Singles from Runway
- 1. "Give Me the Love" Released: April 20, 2016; 2. "Good Luck" Released: August 03, 2016; 3. "Wow War Tonight 〜Get On Up Join Our Movement (Girls Version)" Released: October 28, 2016

Runway is the second studio album and major Japanese release by South Korean girl group AOA. It was released on November 30, 2016 through Virgin Music. Continuing the electro-influenced sound from their first Japanese album, Runway features a wide range of contribution from multiple new producers such as Han Seung Hoon, Lee Sang Ho, Matthew Tishler, Aaron Benward, and Felicia Barton.

Two singles were released prior to the release of the album, "Give Me the Love" and "Good Luck", which both peaked at number-three on the Oricon Singles chart. The group promoted the album and its singles through various Japanese music and variety shows, as well as promoting through their second Japan concert tour titled AOA Summer Concert in Japan ~Angels World 2016~ from July 1–3, 2016.

== Background and release ==
On October 3, 2016, AOA announced that they will release their second Japanese studio album on November 30, 2016.

Runway includes previously released tracks from AOA's fourth and fifth Japanese singles: "Give Me the Love" featuring Takanori Nishikawa; the Japanese versions of "Good Luck," "Still Falls the Rain," and "10 Seconds"; a new Japanese cover song titled "Wow War Tonight 〜Get On Up Join Our Movement (Girls Version)," and other six brand-new tracks.

Two music videos (official and dance version) for the track "Wow War Tonight 〜Get On Up Join Our Movement (Girls Version)" were released through AOA's official Vevo account along with the formal release of the album on November 30, 2016. The first teaser for the music video was released on October 18, 2016 through Universal Music's YouTube account. The short version of the music video was unveiled on October 28, 2016 through Japan music platform GyaO.

On October 24, 2016, the official track list for the album was revealed on AOA's official Japan website. Runway features an additional four original tracks: the title track "Runway," "OK!," "Muah!," and "Love Gave Me You"; plus the Japanese version of "Cherry Pop," which was included in AOA's fourth mini-album Good Luck; and "Perfect Strangers", a Japanese version of the hit song by British musician Jonas Blue.

== Promotion ==
In AOA's second Japan concert tour titled, AOA Summer Concert in Japan ~Angels World 2016~, from July 1–3, 2016, they performed their biggest hits and the Japanese version of "Good Luck" for the first time.

Over the course of two days, from December 10–11, 2016, AOA participated in FNC Entertainment's annual Japan concert entitled, 2016 FNC Kingdom in Japan: Creepy Nights.

== Singles ==
"Give Me the Love" was released on April 8, 2016 as AOA's fourth and first original Japanese single. The physical single comes with 11 editions.

The second single from the album, "Good Luck," was released on August 3, 2016 as their fifth Japanese single. The single also comes with 11 physical editions.

The third track, "Wow War Tonight 〜Get On Up Join Our Movement (Girls Version)," was released digitally as the first promotional single for the album on October 28, 2016.

== Formats ==
On October 18, 2016, it was revealed that Runway would be released in eleven different physical versions: A limited CD+Blu-ray edition (type A), two limited CD+DVD editions (type B and type C), seven limited Picture Label Member CD editions, and a limited first press CD edition that will revert to a regular CD edition. Cover artworks for album editions were also revealed on the same day.

- Limited CD+Blu-ray edition comes with extra Blu-ray content.
- Limited CD+DVD editions come with extra DVD content.
- Limited Picture Label Member CD editions come in a standard jewel case without album cover and lyrics booklet. There are a total of seven editions in matching with seven members.
- Regular CD edition comes in a standard jewel case with a lyrics-only booklet.

== Commercial performance ==
Runway debuted at number 3 on the Oricon Daily Albums Chart for the date November 29, 2016. The album stayed in the Top 10 for the rest of its first week.

It was reported that Runway sold more than 14,500 copies in its first week, debuting and peaking at number 5 on the Oricon Weekly Albums Chart. To date, Runway has sold a total of 16,628 physical copies in Japan.

== Track listing ==
All editions CD and digital download – standard edition
No.	Title	Writer(s)	Producers	Length
1.	"Runway"	Lee Sang Ho; Seo Yong Bae; Andreas Ohrn; Chris Wahle; Hasegawa	Lee Sang Ho; Bae; Ohrn; Wahle	3:27
2.	"Ok!"	Friday.Galactika; Chang.Galactika; PRAY; LITTLE	Friday.Galactika; Chang.Galactika; PRAY	3:02
3.	"Wow War Tonight〜Get On Up Join Our Movement (Girls Version)" (Wow War Tonight〜時には起こせよムーヴメント; Wow War Tonight〜Toki ni wa Okose yo Movement) (H Jungle with t cover)	Tetsuya Komuro	Tetsuya Komuro	5:15
4.	"Muah!"	Choi In Sun; Darly; CHIEMI	BreadBeat; Wonderkid; Jun Hong Sung	3:19
5.	"Cherry Pop" (Japanese Version)	Han Sung Ho; Misfit; InnoVator; Kota Morita	Hyuk Shin; DK; Mher Filian; Naz Tokio; Melanie Fontana	3:17
6.	"Give Me the Love" (愛をちょうだい; Ai wo Choudai) (Feat. Takanori Nishikawa)	Han Seung Hoon; Lee Sang Ho; Andreas Ohrn; Chris Wahle; Hasegawa; Anan	Hoon; Lee Sang Ho; Ohrn; Wahle	3:48
7.	"Good Luck" (Japanese Version)	Han Sung Ho; Jang Yeon Jung; InnoVator; Hasegawa	Matthew Tishler; Aaron Benward; Felicia Barton	3:09
8.	"Love Gave Me You"	MEG.ME	Kevin Charge; Caroline Gustavsson; Chris Meyer	4:04
9.	"10 Seconds" (Japanese Version)	Shin Jimin; Kim Jae Yang; Park Yi Su; Ume; Hasegawa	Linnea Mary Han Deb; Joy Neil Mitro Deb; Anton Malmberg Hard Af Segerstad; Jennifer Decliveo	4:01
10.	"Still Falls the Rain (Japanese Version)"	Jimin; Seo Yong Bae; LITTLE	Han Seung Hun; Bae	3:21
11.	"Perfect Strangers" (Jonas Blue Feat. AOA)	Guy James Robin; John Paul Cooper; Alex Smith; Kanata Okajima	Robin; Cooper; Smith	3:15
Total length:				40:04

Limited edition type A Blu-ray track list
No.	Title	Length
1.	"AOA Summer Concert in Japan 〜Angels World 2016〜 at Tokyo Dome City Hall" (on July 1, 2016)
2.	"Behind the scenes at Tokyo Dome City Hall" (on July 1, 2016)

Limited edition type B DVD track list
No.	Title	Length
1.	"AOA Summer Concert in Japan 〜Angels World 2016〜 at Tokyo Dome City Hall" (on July 1, 2016)
2.	"Behind the scenes at Nagoya Forest Hall" (on July 3, 2016)

Limited edition type C DVD track list
No.	Title	Length
1.	"Wow War Tonight 〜Get On Up Join Our Movement (Girls Version)" (music video)	5:20
2.	"Wow War Tonight 〜Get On Up Join Our Movement (Girls Version)" (music video – dance version)	5:15
3.	"Give Me the Love" (music video) (featuring Takanori Nishikawa)	5:44
4.	"Good Luck" (Japanese version) (music video)	4:03
5.	"Wow War Tonight 〜Get On Up Join Our Movement (Girls Version)" (making of music video)
6.	"Wow War Tonight 〜Get On Up Join Our Movement (Girls Version)" (making of jacket photos)

== Charts ==
Chart (2016)	Peak position
Japanese Weekly Albums (Oricon)	5
Japanese Weekly Top Albums (Billboard)	4

== Release history ==
Region	Date	Format	Label	Edition(s)
Japan	November 30, 2016	CD+Blu-ray	Virgin Music, Universal Music	Limited edition (type A)
Japan	November 30, 2016	CD+DVD	Virgin Music, Universal Music	Limited editions (type B, type C)
Japan	November 30, 2016	CD	Virgin Music, Universal Music	Limited Picture Label Member editions, limited first press edition, regular edition
Japan	November 30, 2016	Digital download	Virgin Music, Universal Music	Regular Edition
