= Red Motion =

Single album by AOA
- Released: October 14, 2013
- Recorded: 2013
- Genre: K-pop
- Length: 7:17
- Label: FNC

AOA chronology
Moya (2013)	Red Motion (2013)	Miniskirt (2014)

Singles from Red Motion
- 1. "Confused" Released: October 14, 2013

Red Motion (stylized in all caps) is the fourth single album of South Korean girl group AOA. It was released on October 14, 2013, by FNC Entertainment. "Confused" was used as the single album's lead song.

== Release ==
After the summer release of "Moya" from the band's sub-unit AOA Black, AOA teased new music for an autumn release by showing fans concept images from the albums photoshoot. These images showed the girls outfitted in matching white lace dresses in bright white rooms creating an angelic look. A video concept teaser was later released through YouTube on October 3, 2013 and showed the girls in the white lace blind folds from the images. A second teaser released on October 7, 2013 showed scenes from the upcoming music video for "Confused". The clip showed all the girls dancing to the chorus of the song, showing off the groups pin-sharp movements.

AOA released their follow-up Red Motion, featuring the sultry dance title song "Confused". The release also featured a second song, "We Belong Together". Both songs were co-written by the leader of the group, Jimin.

== Promotion ==
On October 10, 2013 AOA appeared for their comeback stage on M Countdown promoting their song "Confused". The girls also showcased the songs through several other programs including Inkigayo, Show Champion, Show! Music Core, The Show and Music Bank.

== Track list ==
The CD single's tracks are as follows:

No.	Title	Lyrics	Music	Length
1.	"Confused" (흔들려; Heundeullyeo; Shake)	Jimin, Kim Do Hoon, Han Sungho & Lee Sangho	Kim Do Hoon, Lee Sangho	3:42
2.	"We Belong Together" (니꺼 내꺼; Nikkeo Naekkeo, Yours Mine)	Jimin, Seo Yongbae & Han Seunghun	Seo Yongbae & Han Seunghun	3:35
Total length:				7:17

== Charts and sales ==
=== Weekly charts ===
Chart	Peak position
Gaon Digital Chart	40
Gaon Album Chart	12
Billboard K-Pop Hot 100	38

=== Sales ===
Chart	Sales
Gaon physical sales	3,136+
Gaon digital sales	80,636+
