= Like a Cat =

EP by AOA
- Released: November 11, 2014
- Recorded: 2014
- Genre: K-pop; electropop; dance-pop
- Length: 18:45
- Language: Korean; Japanese
- Label: FNC

AOA chronology
Short Hair (2014)	Like a Cat (2014)	Heart Attack (2015)

Singles from Like a Cat
- 1. "Like a Cat" Released: November 11, 2014

Music video
- "Like a Cat" on YouTube

Like a Cat (Korean: 사뿐사뿐; RR: Sappun Sappun) is the second extended play by South Korean girl group AOA. It was released on November 11, 2014, by FNC Entertainment. "Like a Cat" was released as the lead single.

== Singles ==
The second track on the EP, "Like a Cat", was written and produced by Brave Brothers and is AOA's third collaboration with him. It is an upbeat track with elements of rock. The music video for "Like a Cat" was released on November 10, 2014. The male actors featured in the music video are Daniel Snoeks (as the banker) and Jake Pains (as one of the bodyguards).

== Promotion ==
The promotion for "Like a Cat" began on November 13, 2014, on M Countdown. On November 19, AOA took first place on MBC Music's Show Champion.

== Reception ==
=== Critical ===
"Like a Cat" was selected by Fuse as one of "November's Top 10 Best Pop Songs We Heard", calling the song "an addictive, sultry track that’s one of the boldest pop songs to come out of Korea."

=== Commercial ===
"Like a Cat" charted at number 3 on the Gaon Album Chart, while the single peaked at number 5 on Gaon Digital Chart on November 15, 2014, and ranked number 1 on Gaon Social Chart for six consecutive weeks. The song also debuted at number 1 on Philippines' Music One Chart and China's KUWO Chart. It also charted at number 7 on Billboard's World Digital Song Sales chart, marking the group's first appearance on the US charts. As of 2016, the EP has sold 29,588 copies in South Korea.

== Japanese version ==
A Japanese version of the song was released on February 25, 2015, as the group's second Japanese single. It was released in nine different versions: a limited CD+DVD edition (type A), a limited CD+Photobook edition (type B), and seven limited CD only editions, one edition per member. The limited editions types A and B include one random photocard from a set of 22. The single also included Japanese versions of "Elvis" and "Just the Two of Us", and Karaoke versions of all three songs.

The single peaked at number 4 on Oricon's weekly singles chart and number 19 on the monthly chart. It also charted at number 10 on the Japan Hot 100.

== Track listing ==
Korean EP and digital download
No.	Title	Lyrics	Music	Length
1.	"AOA" (sung by: Yuna, Jimin & Choa)	Brave Brothers	Brave Brothers	0:59
2.	"Like a Cat" (사뿐사뿐; Sappun Sappun)	Brave Brothers	Brave Brothers, Chakun, JS	3:39
3.	"Girl's Heart" (여자사용법; Yeoja Sayongbeop)	Brave Brothers	Brave Brothers, Elephant Kingdom	3:19
4.	"Just the Two of Us" (단둘이; Danduri)	Jimin, Han Seung-hoon, Seo Yong-bae	Han Seung-hoon, Seo Yong-bae	3:25
5.	"Time"	Chakun	Stars Wars, Chakun, Miss Lee	3:43
6.	"Tears Falling" (휠릴리; Hwillilli)	Jimin, Han Seung-hoon, Seo Yong-bae	Han Seung-hoon, Seo Yong-bae	3:38
Total length:				18:45

Japanese limited edition "Type A, B" CD and Digital download
No.	Title	Lyrics	Music	Length
1.	"Like a Cat" (Japanese version)	Brave Brothers	Brave Brothers	3:43
2.	"Elvis" (Japanese version)	Han Seong Ho	Kim Do Hoon, Lee Sang Ho	3:20
3.	"Just the Two of Us" (Japanese version)	Shin Jimin, Han Seung Hoon, Seo Yong Bae	Han Seung Hoon, Seo Yong Bae	3:25
4.	"Like a Cat" (Karaoke version)		Brave Brothers	3:40
5.	"Elvis" (Karaoke version)		Kim Do Hoon, Lee Sang Ho	3:20
6.	"Just the Two of Us" (Karaoke version)		Han Seung Hoon, Seo Yong Bae	3:27

Japanese limited edition "Member Version" CD
No.	Title	Lyrics	Music	Length
1.	"Like a Cat" (Japanese version)	Brave Brothers	Brave Brothers	3:43
2.	"Just the Two of Us" (Japanese version)	Shin Jimin, Han Seung Hoon, Seo Yong Bae	Han Seung Hoon, Seo Yong Bae	3:25

Japanese limited edition "Type A" CD+DVD
No.	Title	Length
1.	"Like a Cat" (Japanese version)
2.	"Like a Cat" (Japanese dance version)
3.	"Like a Cat" (Japanese version making)
4.	"Elvis" (Korean version)
5.	"Bonus video"

== Charts ==
Chart performance for the single
Chart	Peak position
South Korea (Gaon) (weekly)	5
South Korea (Gaon) (monthly)	12
US World Digital Songs (Billboard)	7

Chart performance for the album
Chart	Peak position
South Korea (Gaon) (weekly)	3
South Korea Gaon (monthly)	7

== Sales and certifications ==
Chart	Amount
Gaon physical sales	29,588
Gaon digital sales	1,248,564
