= Park Cho-a =

South Korean singer (born 1990)

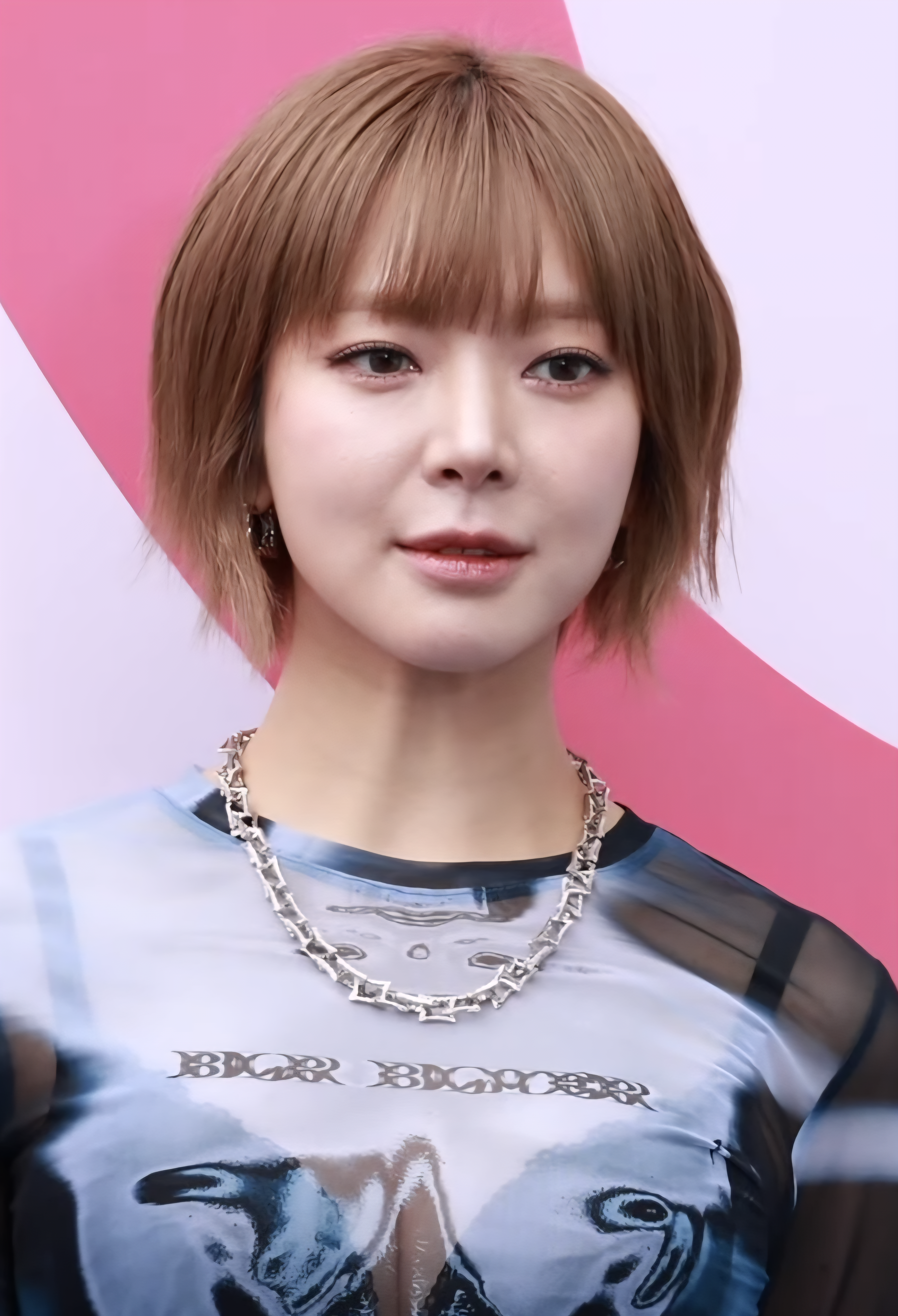
- Choa in February 2024
- Born: March 6, 1990 (age 36); Incheon, South Korea
- Occupations: Singer, Host
- Musical career
- Genres: K-pop
- Instruments: Vocals, guitar
- Years active: 2012–2017; 2020–present
- Labels: FNC; Great M
- Formerly of: AOA; AOA Black

Korean name
- Hangul: 박초아
- Hanja: 朴草娥
- RR: Bak Choa
- MR: Pak Ch'oa

Park Cho-a (Korean: 박초아; born March 6, 1990), known mononymously as Choa (stylized as ChoA), is a South Korean singer. She is best known as a former member of the girl group AOA.

== Early life ==
Choa was born on March 6, 1990, in Incheon, South Korea. She wanted to major in music at university but her conservative father wanted her to get a traditional job, so she enrolled in Aviation Business Administration in Inha Technical College. She also worked as an IPTV salesperson, where she secretly auditioned to be an idol, failing the audition at SM Entertainment 15 times.

Choa's first step in becoming an idol was when she met singer-songwriter Juniel, who told her about FNC's auditions for their girl group, AOA. Both Juniel and Choa were previously trainees at a company that went bankrupt.

== Career ==
=== 2012–2013: Debut with AOA ===
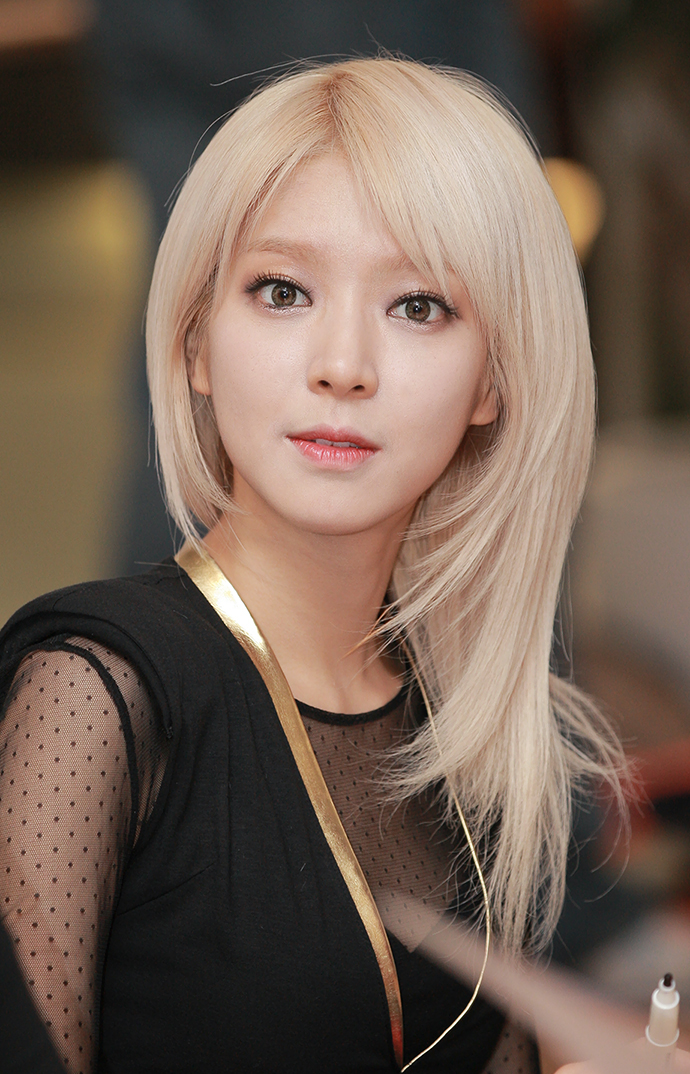
Choa at a fansigning event in 2013

On July 30, 2012, Choa made her debut as a member of AOA on Mnet's M Countdown with the song "Elvis" from their debut single album, Angels' Story.

On June 12, 2013, it was announced that Choa would play the female lead, Gabriella, in the musical High School Musical. The musical ran from July 2 to September 1 at Seoul's Blue Square Samsung Card Hall. She was praised for interpreting the character in her unique style while handling songs that span a wide vocal range.

=== 2014–2017: Solo activities and hiatus ===
In March 2014, Choa released a solo OST for TV Chosun's TV series Bride of the Century. She then appeared as a new cast member on MBC's variety show My Little Television, leaving the show on May 19, 2015. The same year she also became a new model for sports brand NBA's 2015 S/S.

On March 25, 2015, it was revealed that Choa would be one of the members on the studio panel for MBC's We Got Married, replacing Hong Jin-young.

On June 6, 2015, she became an advertising model for Alba Heaven, a website to help people find part-time jobs. She appeared alongside Yoo Byung-jae in a commercial for the website that month.

On July 22, 2015, it was revealed that Choa would collaborate with Primary and Iron for Primary's new single 2-3's song "Don't Be Shy". The song and the full music video starring Choa were released on July 24, 2015. On December 17, 2015, Choa made her solo debut with "Flame", a cover of a song by Jang Hye-jin featuring Gary, with Gary's rap reworked into a section for Choa to sing.

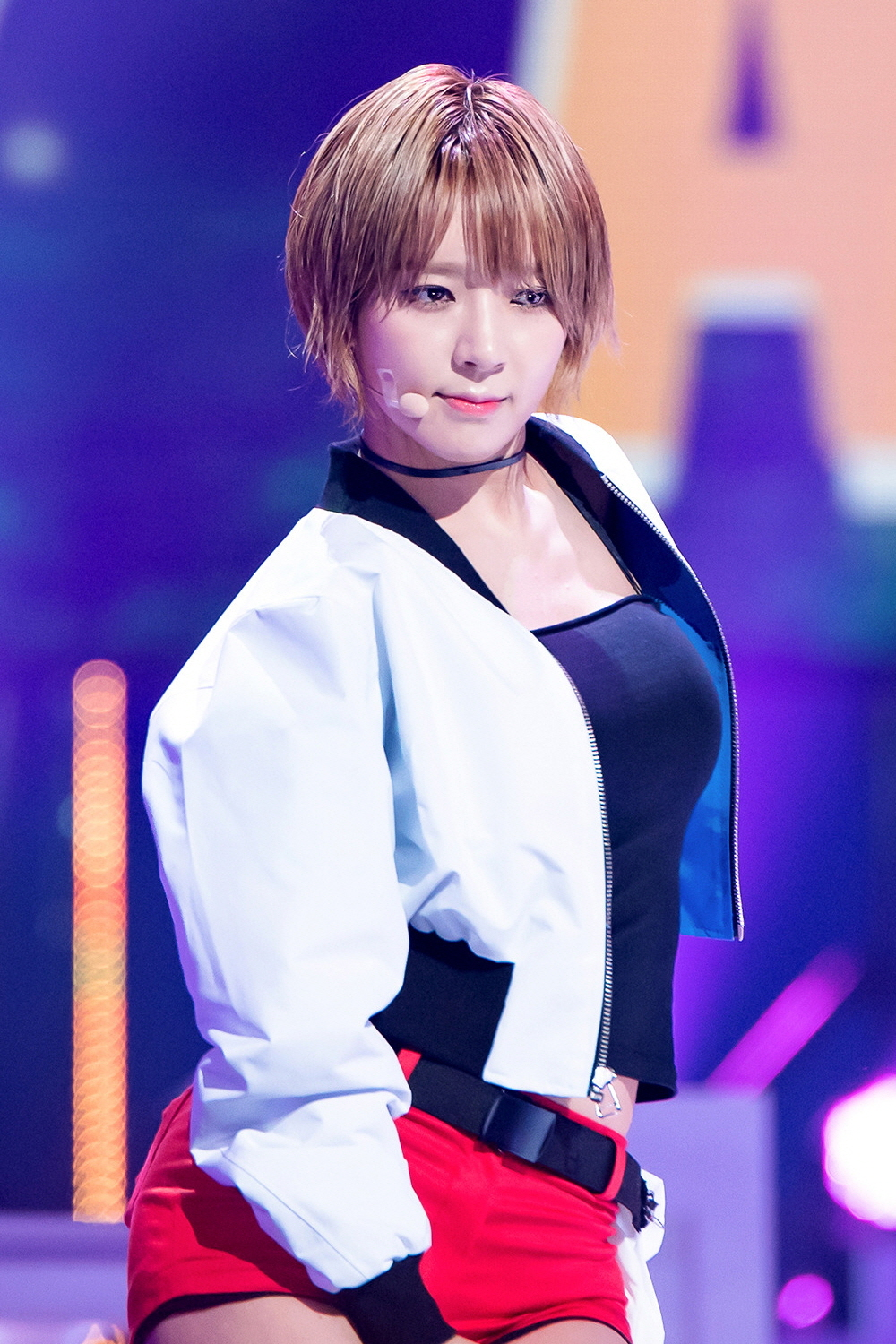
Choa performing in 2016

In October 2016, she was confirmed to be the MC of JTBC new variety show Sing For You, scheduled for December 3, 2016.

On June 22, 2017, Choa announced that she would be leaving AOA due to depression and insomnia. She stated that she had tried using medication to help, however, there was no improvement in her mental health. This followed after Choa had a hiatus from the group following their activities from January 2017 when they released their first studio album Angel's Knock. Her departure from AOA was officially confirmed by FNC Entertainment on June 30, 2017. In May 2019, her contract with FNC expired and was not renewed.

=== 2020–present: Return and Great M ===
After a three-year hiatus from the entertainment industry, it was announced on August 6, 2020, that Choa had recorded a new song for the soundtrack of the KBS2 drama Men Are Men. Officials confirmed her participation after viewers heard the song on the August 3 broadcast of the show, and speculated that the singer sounded similar to Choa. According to an entertainment industry official on August 21, 2020, Choa has moved to Great M Entertainment, a new agency founded by Kim Young-sun, who was a founding member and managing director of FNC Entertainment.

In March 2022, it was announced that Choa was preparing to release a single titled "Yesterday" on April 9, 2022. In July 2022, Choa was announced as a main host of Your Literacy+.

On November 28, 2023, Choa was announced as one of the cast members of Diva Sisters, a variety show featuring five singers who get together to talk candidly about the entertainment industry and their careers. Other cast members included Chae Ri-na, Lee Ji-hye, Ivy, and Narsha.

== Discography ==
=== Singles ===
Title	Year	Peak chart positions	Sales	Album
Title	Year	KOR	Sales	Album
As lead artist
"Flame" (불꽃)	2015	25	KOR: 186,176	Non-album singles
"Yesterday"	2022	— (Note: "Yesterday" didn't enter Gaon Digital Chart, but peaked 104 position on the Gaon Download Chart.)	—N/a	Non-album singles
"Butterfly" (with Juncoco)	2023	—	—N/a	Non-album singles
As featured artist
"Don't Be Shy" (아끼지마) (Primary featuring Choa and Iron)	2015	10	KOR: 402,060	2
"Cloud" (Primary featuring Choa)	2020	— (Note: "Cloud" didn't enter Gaon Digital Chart, but peaked 85 position on the Gaon Download Chart.)	—N/a	Boxtape
"—" denotes a recording that did not chart

=== Soundtrack appearances ===
Title	Year	Peak chart positions	Sales	Album
Title	Year	KOR	Sales	Album
"Breaking Free" (자유롭게) (Choa with Lee Jae-jin)	2013	—	—N/a	High School Musical on Stage! OST
"What I Wanted to Say" (아직 하지 못한 말)	2014	—	—N/a	Bride of the Century OST
"Happy Me" (행복한) (Choa with Byul)	2015	—	—N/a	King of Mask Singer OST
"Beautiful Restriction" (아름다운 구속)	2015	—	—N/a	King of Mask Singer OST
"I Guess" (그런가봐요) (piano by Yoo Hee-yeol)	2015	26	KOR: 84,692	Two Yoo Project Sugar Man OST
"Sing For U" (Choa with Kim Tae-woo)	2017	—	—N/a	Sing For You OST
"What More Do You Need To Say" (무슨 말이 더 필요해)	2017	—	—N/a	Sing For You OST
"Here I Am" (난 여기 있어요)	2020	— (Note: "Here I Am" didn't enter Gaon Digital Chart, but peaked at 130 position on the Gaon Download Chart.)	—N/a	Men Are Men OST
"Thorn" (가시)	2021	— (Note: "Thorn" didn't enter Gaon Digital Chart, but peaked at 43 position on the Gaon Download Chart and at 22 position on the Gaon BGM Chart.)	—N/a	Lovestruck in the City OST
"I Wish"	2022	—	—N/a	Never Give Up OST Part 8
"—" denotes a recording that did not chart

== Filmography ==
=== Television shows ===
Year	Title	Role	Notes	Ref.
2015	We Got Married	Host		
2015	King of Mask Singer	Contestant	Omae, Fall Autumn Foliage (Ep 25–26)	
2016	Girl Who Leapt Charts	Host		
2016	Sing For You	Host		
2021	On & Off	Cast member	Season 2	
2021	Shutdown Fairy	Cast member		
2021	Beauty Time 3	Cast member		
2021	Awesome Romance	Host	Episode 1–8	
2022	Surprise: Secret Room	Host	Spin-off	
2022	Your Literacy+	Host		
2023–present	Diva Sisters	Cast member		

=== Web shows ===
Year	Title	Role	Ref.
2021	Blue Chip Stars	Host	
2021	Double Trouble	Contestant	

== Awards and nominations ==
Name of the award ceremony, year presented, category, nominee of the award, and the result of the nomination
Award ceremony	Year	Category	Nominee / Work	Result	Ref.
MBC Entertainment Awards	2015	New Star of the Year	We Got Married	Won	
