= Short Hair (EP) =

EP by AOA
- Released: June 19, 2014
- Recorded: 2014
- Studio: FNC (Seoul)
- Genre: K-pop; electropop; dance-pop
- Length: 24:08
- Language: Korean
- Label: FNC
- Producer: Brave Brothers

AOA chronology
| Miniskirt (2014) | Short Hair (2014) | Like a Cat (2014) |

Singles from Short Hair
- 1. "Short Hair" Released: June 19, 2014; 2. "Joa Yo!" Released: July 24, 2014

Music video
- "Short Hair" on YouTube

Short Hair (Korean: 단발머리; RR: Danbalmeori) is the debut extended play by South Korean girl group AOA, It was released on June 19, 2014 by FNC Entertainment. "Short Hair" was released as the lead single.

== Background and release ==
On May 25, 2014, AOA revealed that they were going to have a comeback in June with their first mini-album.

The song "Joa Yo!" was used to promote their first DVD and photobook "Hot Summer". It was released as the second single of the album on July 24, 2014.

== Promotion ==
The promotions of the song "Short Hair" started on June 19, 2014, on M! Countdown. The song was also promoted on the shows, Music Bank, Music Core and Inkigayo.

== Track listing ==
Short Hair track listing
| No. | Title | Lyrics | Music | Length |
|---|---|---|---|---|
| 1. | "Fantasy" | Star Wars (별들의전쟁) | Star Wars, 미쓰리 | 1:17 |
| 2. | "Short Hair" (단발머리; Danbal Meori) | Brave Brothers | Brave Brothers, Elephant Kingdom | 3:34 |
| 3. | "Joa Yo!" | Brave Brothers, Star Wars | Brave Brothers, Star Wars | 4:19 |
| 4. | "Soulmate" (내 반쪽; Nae Banjjok) | Brave Brothers | Brave Brothers, Elephant Kingdom | 3:40 |
| 5. | "You Know That" (말이 안 통해; Mari An Tonghae) | Brave Brothers, Star Wars | Brave Brothers, Star Wars | 3:23 |
| 6. | "Short Hair" (단발머리; Danbal Meori Instrumental) | | Brave Brothers, Elephant Kingdom | 3:34 |
| 7. | "Joa Yo!" (Instrumental) | | Brave Brothers, Star Wars | 4:19 |
| Total length: | | | | 24:08 |

== Charts ==
| Chart | Peak position |
|---|---|
| Gaon Weekly album chart | 4 |
| Gaon Monthly album chart | 11 |

== Sales and certifications ==
| Chart | Amount |
|---|---|
| Gaon physical sales | 16,930+ |
