= Good Luck (AOA EP) =

- Week Version and digital edition cover

EP by AOA
- Released: May 16, 2016
- Recorded: 2015–2016
- Genre: K-pop; electropop; dance-pop
- Length: 17:05
- Label: FNC

AOA chronology
Ace of Angels (2015)	Good Luck (2016)	Runway (2016)

Singles from Good Luck
- 1. "Good Luck" Released: May 16, 2016

Good Luck is the fourth extended play by South Korean girl group AOA. It was released as a digital download on May 16, 2016 by FNC Entertainment and distributed by LOEN Entertainment. The physical album was released two days later on May 18. To promote the EP, the group appeared on several South Korean music programs, including Music Bank, Show! Music Core and Inkigayo. The song of the same name was released as the lead song for the EP.

The mini-album was a commercial success peaking at number 2 on the Gaon Album Chart in its first week.

== Background and release ==
In April 2016, FNC Entertainment launched the band's official comeback page along with the announcement of the fourth mini album Good Luck and the title track of the same name.

Different teasers titled "Week Version" and "Weekend Version" for the music video were released from May 12 to May 14. On May 16, the music video for the title track "Good Luck" were released online through YouTube and Naver's V App.

The music video was shot in Tamuning, Guam, and features the members as lifeguards during the day and partying at night. A first version of the music video was released, but was then quickly taken down allegedly because of the presence of an unwanted Toyota brand endorsement and of the visibility of a small part of Jimin's bosom. It was then replaced by an edited version.

Member Jimin participated in writing the lyrics for "10 Seconds", "Crazy Boy", and "Still Falls the Rain". The song "Still Falls the Rain" is a Korean version of the Japanese song originally included on AOA's fourth Japanese single "Give Me the Love", which was released in April 2016.

The physical release also comes in two versions: Week and Weekend. In July 2016, Good Luck was reported to sell more than 41,000 copies in South Korea, marking it as AOA's fastest-selling album so far.

On August 10, a special video featuring "Cherry Pop" was released to celebrate AOA's fourth anniversary.

== Promotion ==
AOA held a live showcase on May 16, where they performed "Good Luck" and "10 Seconds", along with other previous title tracks. They concluded their promotional cycle for Good Luck with a final performance on SBS's Inkigayo on May 29, only two weeks after the release of the album. Fans speculated that this was due to the controversy surrounding Jimin and Seolhyun as well as their contentious win on Music Bank, but FNC said they "had already started planning for a concert-type fan event around the time of AOA's comeback".

== Commercial performance ==
Good Luck entered and peaked at number 2 on the Gaon Album Chart on the chart issue dated May 15–21, 2016. The mini-album placed at number 10 on the Gaon Album Chart for the month of May 2016 with 38,924 copies sold, and at number 43 for the month of June 2016 with 2,224 copies sold, selling a total of 41,148 physical copies.

== Track listing ==
No.	Title	Lyrics	Music	Arrangement	Length
1.	"Good Luck"	Jang Yeon-jeong, Innovator, Han Seong-ho	Matthew Tishler, Aaron Benward, Felicia Barton	Matthew Tishler, Aaron Benward, Felicia Barton	3:07
2.	"10 Seconds"	Shin Ji-min, Kim Jae-yang, Park Isu	Linnea Mary Han Deb, Joy Neil Mitro Deb, Anton Malmberg Haard Af Segerstad, Jennifer Decilveo	Linnea Mary Han Deb, Joy Neil Mitro Deb, Anton Malmberg Haard Af Segerstad, Jennifer Decilveo	3:56
3.	"Cherry Pop"	Misfit, Innovator, Han Seong-ho	Hyuk Shin, DK, Mher Filian, Naz Tokio, Melanie Fontana, Christina Grimmie	Hyuk Shin, Mher Filian, Naz Tokio, Melanie Fontana, Christina Grimmie	3:16
4.	"Crazy Boy"	Shin Ji-min, Han Seong-ho	Kim Do-hoon, Lee Sang-ho	Lee Sang-ho	3:29
5.	"Still Falls The Rain"	Shin Ji-min, Seo Yong-bae	Han Seung-hoon, Seo Yong-bae	Seo Yong-bae	3:17
Total length:					17:05

== Charts ==
Chart	Peak position
Gaon Album Chart (weekly)	2
Gaon Album Chart (monthly)	10
