= N.Flying discography =

- Studio albums: 2
- EPs: 9
- Singles: 18

South Korean band N.Flying has released two studio albums, nine extended plays, and one single album.

== Album ==
=== Studio albums ===
List of studio albums, with selected chart positions and sales
Title	Details	Peak chart positions		Sales
Title	Details	KOR	JPN	Sales
Brotherhood	Released: May 22, 2019 (JPN); Label: FNC Music Japan; Formats: CD, digital download	—	10	JPN: 7,090
Man on the Moon	Released: June 7, 2021 (KOR); Label: FNC Entertainment; Formats: CD, digital download	4	50	KOR: 58,945; JPN: 894 (Phy.)
Everlasting	Released: May 28, 2025 (KOR); Label: FNC Entertainment; Formats: CD, digital download	9	—	KOR: 109,458

=== Reissue albums ===
List of reissues, with selected chart positions and sales
Title	Details	Peak chart positions	Sales
Title	Details	KOR	Sales
Turbulence	Released: October 6, 2021; Label: FNC Entertainment; Formats: CD, digital download	9	KOR: 29,200

=== Single albums ===
List of single albums, with selected chart positions and sales
Title	Details	Peak chart positions	Sales
Title	Details	KOR	Sales
Lonely	Released: October 22, 2015; Label: FNC Entertainment; Formats: CD, digital download	9	KOR: 2,756

== Extended plays ==
List of extended plays, with selected chart positions and sales
Title	Details	Peak chart positions	Sales
Title	Details	KOR	Sales
Awesome	Released: May 20, 2015; Label: FNC Entertainment; Formats: CD, digital download; Track listing: 1. "One N Only"; 2. "Awesome" (기가 막혀); 3. "Heartbreak" (가슴이 놀래); 4. "All In"; 5. "One Minute" (1분)	4	KOR: 3,968
The Real: N.Flying	Released: August 2, 2017; Label: FNC Entertainment; Formats: CD, digital download; Track listing: 1. "Let's Get Down to It"; 2. "The Real" (진짜가 나타났다); 3. "I'm Okay" (다행이야); 4. "Don't Mess with Me" (정리가 안돼); 5. "Say Goodbye" (짠해); 6. "R U Ready?"	8	KOR: 4,580
The Hottest: N.Flying	Released: January 3, 2018; Label: FNC Entertainment; Formats: CD, digital download; Track listing: 1. "Don't Forget This" (그러니까 우라); 2. "Hot Potato" (뜨거운 감자); 3. "Crossroad" (골목길에서); 4. "I Know U Know"; 5. "Can't Be Better" (이보다 좋을까); 6. "Just One Day" (딱 하루만)	24	KOR: 6,000
How Are You?	Released: May 16, 2018; Label: FNC Entertainment; Formats: CD, digital download; Track listing: 1. "How R U Today"; 2. "Up All Night"; 3. "Lovefool" (팔불출); 4. "Anyway"; 5. "Fall with You"	14	KOR: 7,919
Spring Memories	Released: April 24, 2019; Label: FNC Entertainment; Formats: CD, digital download; Track listing: 1. "Spring Memories" (봄이 부시게); 2. "Leave It" (놔); 3. "Flowerwork" (불놀이); 4. "Preview"; 5. "Rooftop" (옥탑방); 6. "Like a Flower" (꽃)	5	KOR: 31,749
Yaho	Released: October 15, 2019; Label: FNC Entertainment; Formats: CD, digital download	3	KOR: 51,237
So, Communication	Released: June 10, 2020; Label: FNC Entertainment; Formats: CD, digital download	4	KOR: 68,825
Dearest	Released: October 17, 2022; Label: FNC Entertainment; Formats: CD, digital download	7	KOR: 51,266
Still	Released: October 8, 2026; Label: FNC Entertainment; Formats: CD, digital download; Track listing: 1. "Still" (잔불); 2. "My Dearest" (고생했어); 3. "Wake Up" (나를 사랑하지 않는 너에게); 4. "The Way We Were" (어쩌면 가장 서툰 내가 좋았어); 5. "Hongsil" (홍실); 6. "Our Ending" (아는 결말); 7. "Fading Away" (우주먼지)	4	KOR: 96,977

== Singles ==
=== Korean singles ===
List of singles, showing year released, with selected chart positions, sales figure, certification and album name
Title	Year	Peak chart positions		Sales	Certifications	Album
Title	Year	KOR Circle	KOR Hot	Sales	Certifications	Album
"Awesome" (기가 막혀)	2015	—	—	—N/a	—N/a	Awesome
"Lonely"	2015	—	—	—N/a	—N/a	Lonely
"The Real" (진짜가 나타났다)	2017	—	—	—N/a	—N/a	The Real: N.Flying
"Hot Potato" (뜨거운 감자)	2018	—	—	—N/a	—N/a	The Hottest: N.Flying
"How R U Today"	2018	—	—	—N/a	—N/a	How Are You?
"Like a Flower" (꽃)	2018	—	—	—N/a	—N/a	Spring Memories
"It's Fine" (괜찮아)	2019	—	—	—N/a	—N/a	Non-album single
"Rooftop" (옥탑방)	2019	1	1	KOR: 2,500,000	KMCA: Platinum (st.); KMCA: Platinum (dig.)	Spring Memories
"Spring Memories" (봄이 부시게)	2019	117	—	—N/a	—N/a	Spring Memories
"Good Bam" (굿밤)	2019	142	—	—N/a	—N/a	Yaho
"Oh Really." (아 진짜요.)	2020	126	58	—N/a	—N/a	So, Communication
"Starlight"	2020	—	94	—N/a	—N/a	Non-album single
"Moonshot"	2021	152	—	—N/a	—N/a	Man on the Moon
"Sober"	2021	—	—	—N/a	—N/a	Turbulence
"I Like You" (폭망)	2022	—	—	—N/a	—N/a	Dearest
"Blue Moon"	2023	64	—	—N/a	—N/a	Once in a Blue Moon
"Lover"	2023	—	—	—N/a	—N/a	Non-album singles
"Into You" (네가 내 마음에 자리 잡았다)	2024	41	—	—N/a	—N/a	Non-album singles
"Everlasting" (만년설)	2025	76	—	—N/a	—N/a	Everlasting
"In Between Seasons" (환절기 (換節期))	2026	—	—	—N/a	—N/a	Non-album single
"Still" (잔불)	2026	96	—	—N/a	—N/a	Still
"—" denotes releases that did not chart or were not released in that region.

=== Japanese singles ===
List of singles, showing year released, with selected chart positions and sales figure
Title	Year	Peak chart positions	Sales
Title	Year	JPN	Sales
"Basket"	2013	35	JPN: 5,264 (Phy.)
"One and Only"	2014	134	—N/a
"Knock Knock"	2016	13	JPN: 6,164 (Phy.)
"Endless Summer"	2016	10	JPN: 9,705 (Phy.)
"Doll"	2019	12	JPN: 11,122 (Phy.)
"Kick-Ass"	2019	12	JPN: 11,122 (Phy.)
"Amnesia"	2021	—	—N/a
"—" denotes releases that did not chart or were not released in that region.

== Soundtrack appearances ==
List of soundtrack appearances, showing year released, with selected chart positions and album name
Title	Year	Peak chart positions	Album
Title	Year	KOR	Album
"So Pretty" (예쁘다 예뻐)	2018	—	Luv Pub OST
"Let Me Show You"	2018	—	Familiar Wife OST
"From You"	2020	—	Alice OST
"I'll Find You"	2021	—	Royal Secret Agent OST
"Chance"	2021	—	Lord of Heroes OST
"Crazy For You" (너에게로 가는 길)	2022	—	Ditto OST
"Wonderful Night" (아름다운 밤)	2023	—	Taxi Driver 2 OST
"Star"	2024	85	Lovely Runner OST

== Other charted songs ==
List of other charted songs, showing year released, with selected chart positions and album name
Title	Year	Peak chart positions	Album
Title	Year	KOR	Album
"Flashback"	2021	48	Man on the Moon
"Firefly"	2022	148	Dearest

== Compilation appearances ==
Title	Year	Album
"It's Christmas" (with FNC Artist)	2018	FNC LAB #2 'It's Christmas'
"Rooftop Freedom" (옥탑방 프리덤) (with UV)	2019	The Call 2 Project No.1
"Rockstar" (with DinDin & Muzie)	2019	The Call 2 Project No.4
"Rain" (with Noel	2019	The Call 2 Project No.5
"Check It Right Now" (재껴라) (with UV, DinDin & Noel)	2019	The Call 2 Final Project
"Don't Cry"	2020	Two Yoo Project Sugar Man 3 Episode.10
"Beautiful Scenery" (아름다운 강산)	2022	New Festa Episode.11
"Sing Along" (with FNC Artists)	2022	Sing Along

== See also ==
- Cha Hun discography
- J.don discography
- Yoo Hwe-seung discography
