= List of songs recorded by N.Flying =

Here is a complete list of songs by the South Korean band N.Flying.

== 0–9 ==
Song	Artist(s)	Writer(s)	Album/Single	Language	Year	Ref.
"1" (일)	N.Flying	Kim Su-bin; J.don	Dearest	Korean	2022	
"1 Minute" (1분)	N.Flying	Inno; J.don; Kim Jae-yang; Lee Jin-ho	Awesome	Korean	2015	
"4242"	N.Flying	Dillon Dixon; Josef Melin; Kim Su-bin; J.don; Han Seong-ho	Yaho	Korean	2019	

== A ==
Song	Artist(s)	Writer(s)	Album/Single	Language	Year	Ref.
"All In"	N.Flying	Inno; J.don; Han Seung-hun; Kwon Kwang-jin	Awesome	Korean	2015	
"All In"	N.Flying	Inno; J.don; Han Seung-hun; Kwon Kwang-jin	Knock Knock	Japanese	2016	
"Aloha" (아로하)	N.Flying	Kim Tae-hun; Wi Jong-su	Immortal Songs: Singing the Legend EP.460	Korean	2020	
"Amnesia"	N.Flying	J.don; Satoshi Shibayama	Amnesia	Japanese	2021	
"Another Day"	Yoo Hwe-seung	Ji Il-guk; Davey Nate; Appu Krishnan; Jason Jones; K.Chozen	Criminal Minds OST	Korean	2017	
"Anyway"	N.Flying	Leez; Ollounder; J.don	How Are You?	Korean	2018	
"Ask"	N.Flying	Kim Su-bin; J.don; Cha Hun	Man on the Moon	Korean	2021	
"Autumn Dream"	N.Flying	Kim Su-bin; J.don	Yaho	Korean	2019	
"Awesome" (기가 막혀)	N.Flying	Han Seong-ho; Inno; Kim Do-hun	Awesome	Korean	2015	
"Awesome" (기가 막혀)	N.Flying	Han Seong-ho; Inno; Kim Do-hun	Awesome	Chinese	2015	
"Awesome" (기가 막혀)	N.Flying	Han Seong-ho; Inno; Kim Do-hun	Knock Knock	Japanese	2016	

== B ==
Song	Artist(s)	Writer(s)	Album/Single	Language	Year	Ref.
"Basket"	N.Flying	Hong In-ho; R307; Sleepy; Vinyl House 1	Basket	English	2013	
"Beautiful Scenery" (아름다운 강산)	N.Flying	Shin Joong-hyun	New Festa Episode.11	Korean	2022	
"Bitter Sweet"	N.Flying	Hong In-ho; Park Eun-woo; Ryo; Seo Yong-bae; Sleepy	Basket	English	2013	
"Blue Moon"	N.Flying	J.don; Kim Su-bin	Once in a BLUE MOON	Korean	2023	
"Blue Scene" (파란 배경)	N.Flying	Yoo Hwe-seung; Park Su-seok; Seo Dong-sung; Seo Ji-eun; J.don	Man on the Moon	Korean	2021	
"Born To Be"	N.Flying	J.don; Kim Su-bin	Everlasting	Korean	2025	
"Brother"	Yoo Hwe-seung	Lee Young-jun; Lee Sang-jun; Jeong Dong-hwan	The Seasons Vol II. 7 <AKMU's Long day Long night> ReːWake x Yoo Hwe Seung	Korean	2023	

== C ==
Song	Artist(s)	Writer(s)	Album/Single	Language	Year	Ref.
"Can't Be Better" (이보다 좋을까)	N.Flying	Han Seung-hun; J.don	The Hottest: N.flying	Korean	2018	
"Chance"	N.Flying	Jello Ann; Nam Hye-seung; Surf Green; Park Jin-ho; Lee Jae-woo	Lord of Heroes OST	Korean	2021	
"Chance"	N.Flying	Jello Ann; Nam Hye-seung; Surf Green; Park Jin-ho; Lee Jae-woo	Lord of Heroes OST	Japanese	2021	
"Change"	Yoo Hwe-seung	Park Joo-yeon; Cho Jang-hyuck	Change	Korean	2025	
"Check It Right Now" (재껴라)	N.Flying; UV; DinDin; Noel	UV; DinDin; J.don; Yoo Jun-seong	The Call 2 Final Project	Korean	2019	
"Clicker" (클리커)	J.don	TM; J.don; Lee Hyeon-seung	On The Track	Korean	2021	
"Color"	N.Flying	J.don; Satoshi Shibayama	Brotherhood	Japanese	2019	
"Comma," (쉼표)	N.Flying	Kim Su-bin; J.don	Man on the Moon	Korean	2021	
"Crazy For You" (너에게로 가는 길)	N.Flying	Kim Ju-hee; Bang Yong-seok	Ditto OST	Korean	2022	
"Crossroad" (골목길에서)	N.Flying	Kim Chang-rak; Seo Yong-bae; J.don	The Hottest: N.flying	Korean	2018	

== D ==
Song	Artist(s)	Writer(s)	Album/Single	Language	Year	Ref.
"Dangerously"	J.don; Yoo Hwe-seung	riskypizza Czaer	Stage Fighter(STF) Original Vol.4	Korean	2024	
"Delight"	N.Flying	J.don; Satoshi Shibayama; Yoo Hwe-seung	Brotherhood	Japanese	2019	
"Delinquent" (날라리)	Yoo Hwe-seung; Sway D	Sway D	The Master of Producer Part 3	Korean	2019	
"Destiny"	Yoo Hwe-seung	Park Ji-hun	Elsword OST : Destiny	Korean	2023	
"Doll"	N.Flying	Cha Hun; J.don; Satoshi Shibayama	Doll/Kick-Ass	Japanese	2019	
"Don't Cry"	N.Flying	SiHa	Two Yoo Project Sugar Man 3 Episode.10	Korean	2020	
"Don't Forget This" (그러니까 우리)	N.Flying	Han Seung-hun; J.don; Go Jin-yeong	The Hottest: N.flying	Korean	2018	
"Don't Mess With Me" (정리가 안돼)	N.Flying	Han Seung-hun; Kim Chang-rak; Seo Yong-bae	The Real: N.flying	Korean	2017	

== E ==
Song	Artist(s)	Writer(s)	Album/Single	Language	Year	Ref.
"E-Yo" (에요)	N.Flying	N.Flying; Kim Su-bin; J.don	So, Communication	Korean	2020	
"Endless Summer"	N.Flying	Hasegawa; Yuzuru Kusugo; Hajime Watanabe	Endless Summer	Japanese	2016	
"Everlasting" (만년설)	N.Flying	J.don; Kim Su-bin	Everlasting	Korean	2025	
"Expectation" (기대)	Yoo Hwe-seung	Shim Jae-hee; Kim Hyeong-seok	Expectation	Korean	2018	

== F ==
Song	Artist(s)	Writer(s)	Album/Single	Language	Year	Ref.
"Fading Away" (우주먼지)	N.Flying	J.don; Kim Su-bin	Still	Korean	2026	
"Fall With You" (너 없는 난)	N.Flying	Jonas Mengler; Justin Reinstein; Lee Dong-Eun; J.don	How Are You?	Korean	2018	
"Farewell Under The Sun" (대낮에 한 이별)	Yoo Hwe-seung; Hynn	Park Jin-young	You Hee Yul's Sketchbook With You : 75th Voice 'Sketchbook X Yoo Hwe Seung (N.Flying), HYNN'	Korean	2021	
"Fate" (이 별 저 별)	N.Flying	Kim Su-bin; J.don	Man on the Moon	Korean	2021	
"Fight On"	Yoo Hwe-seung	Park Sang-yu; San Yoon; MLC; Vendors (Louis); Vendors (Fascinador)	Doctor Lawyer OST	Korean	2022	
"Firefly"	N.Flying	Kim Su-bin; J.don	Dearest	Korean	2022	
"Flashback"	N.Flying	Yoo Hwe-seung; J.don	Man on the Moon	Korean	2021	
"Flower Fantasy"	N.Flying	Kim Su-bin; J.don	So, Communication	Korean	2020	
"Flowerwork" (불놀이)	N.Flying	J.don; Jeong Jin-wook; Jo Se-hee	Spring Memories	Korean	2019	
"From You"	N.Flying	Jeon Geun-hwa; Sim	Alice OST	Korean	2020	

== G ==
Song	Artist(s)	Writer(s)	Album/Single	Language	Year	Ref.
"Garosugil At Dawn (2023)" (새벽 가로수길 (2023))	Yoo Hwe-seung; Baek Z Young	Tank	My Love OST	Korean	2023	
"God"	J.don; Jimin	Jimin; J.don; Inno; A Rhymer	N Project #1 God	Korean	2015	
"Good Bam" (굿밤)	N.Flying	Justin Reinstein; J.don; Lee Woo-min	Yaho	Korean	2019	
"Good Bam" (굿밤)	N.Flying	Justin Reinstein; J.don; Lee Woo-min	Yaho	Chinese	2019	

== H ==
Song	Artist(s)	Writer(s)	Album/Single	Language	Year	Ref.
"HAPPY ME!" (행복해버리기)	N.Flying	J.don; Kim Su-bin	Everlasting	Korean	2025	
"Hate and Miss You" (미워하다, 그리워하고)	Yoo Hwe-seung	Choi Han-sol; Mun Si-on	Hate and Miss You	Korean	2024	
"Heavenly Fate (Live ver.)" (천상연 (Live ver.))	Park Ki-young; Yoo Hwe-seung	Yoo Hae-jun	Mask Singer 10th Anniversary Special Album (Live Version)	Korean	2025	
"Hello Solo"	N.Flying	Anan; Seo Yong-bae; Han Seung-hun	Endless Summer	Japanese	2016	
"Heartbreak" (가슴이 놀래)	N.Flying	Han Seong-ho; Inno; J.don; Kim Jae-yang	Awesome	Korean	2015	
"Hongsil" (홍실)	N.Flying	J.don; Kim Su-bin	Still	Korean	2026	
"Hot Potato" (뜨거운 감자)	N.Flying	Kim Chang-rak; Seo Yong-bae; J.don; Cesar Peralta	The Hottest: N.flying	Korean	2018	
"Hot Potato" (뜨거운 감자)	N.Flying	Kim Chang-rak; Seo Yong-bae; J.don; Cesar Peralta	The Hottest: N.flying	Chinese	2018	
"How R U Today"	N.Flying	Kim Su-bin; Kim Chang-rak; J.don; Jo Se-hee	How Are You?	Korean	2018	
"How R U Today"	N.Flying	Kim Su-bin; Kim Chang-rak; J.don; Jo Se-hee	How Are You?	Chinese	2018	

== I ==
Song	Artist(s)	Writer(s)	Album/Single	Language	Year	Ref.
"I Know U Know"	N.Flying	Han Seung-hun; Seo Yong-bae	The Hottest: N.flying	Korean	2018	
"I Like You" (폭망)	N.Flying	Kim Su-bin; J.don	Dearest	Korean	2022	
"I Still Love You" (추억은 만남보다 이별에 남아)	Monday Kiz; DK; Yoo Hwe-seung; Bang Ye-dam; Woody	Moon Sung-wook; Bang Min-gue	The Listen: We Sing Together Again	Korean	2024	
"I Think I Did" (그랬나봐)	Yoo Hwe-seung	You Hee-yeol	Lovely Runner OST	Korean	2024	
"I'll Find You"	N.Flying	Yoon Il-sang	Royal Secret Agent OST	Korean	2021	
"I'm Gonna" (아무거나)	N.Flying	Park Hyeon-woo; J.don; Jeong Jin-wook	So, Communication	Korean	2020	
"I'm Okay" (다행이야)	N.Flying	Han Seung-hun; Kim Chang-rak; Lim Su-ho; Seo Yong-bae; J.don	The Real: N.flying	Korean	2017	
"If You Were Me" (니가 나라면)	Yoo Hwe-seung; Jimin; Yuna	Armadillos; Jimin	A Korean Odyssey OST	Korean	2018	
"In Between Seasons" (환절기 (換節期))	N.Flying	J.don; Han Seong-ho; Seo Yong-bae; TAEY	In Between Seasons	Korean	2026	
"Into Bloom" (피었습니다.)	N.Flying	J.don	Turbulence	Korean	2021	
"Into You" (네가 내 마음에 자리 잡았다)	N.Flying	J.don; Seo Yong-bae; Lee Sang-ho	Into You	Korean	2024	
"It's Christmas"	FNC Artist	Kim Su-jeong; Erik Lidbom; Julie Yu; Samdell	FNC LAB 'It's Christmas'	Korean	2018	
"It's Fine" (괜찮아)	N.Flying	Kim Su-bin; J.don	It's Fine	Korean	2019	

== J ==
Song	Artist(s)	Writer(s)	Album/Single	Language	Year	Ref.
"Just Knowing That You're in This World" (그대가 이 세상에 있는 것만으로)	N.Flying	Kim Kwang-jin	Immortal Songs: Singing the Legend EP.402	Korean	2019	
"Just One Day" (딱 하루만)	N.Flying	J.don; Kim Su-bin; Kim Chang-rak; Andy Platts	The Hottest: N.flying	Korean	2018	

== K ==
Song	Artist(s)	Writer(s)	Album/Single	Language	Year	Ref.
"Kick-Ass"	N.Flying	J.don; Satoshi Shibayama; Yuzuru Kusugo	Doll/Kick Ass	Japanese	2019	
"Kiss Me, Miss Me"	N.Flying	—N/a	Basket	English	2013	
"Knock Knock"	N.Flying	J.don; Inno; Han Seung-hun; Go Jin-yeong	Lonely	Korean	2015	
"Knock Knock"	N.Flying	J.don; Inno; Han Seung-hun; Go Jin-yeong	Knock Knock	Japanese	2016	

== L ==
Song	Artist(s)	Writer(s)	Album/Single	Language	Year	Ref.
"Last Song" (마지막 무대)	N.Flying	Go Jin-yeong; J.don	So, Communication	Korean	2020	
"Leave It" (놔)	N.Flying	J.don	Spring Memories	Korean	2019	
"Let Me Know"	N.Flying	J.don; Satoshi Shibayama	Amnesia	Japanese	2021	
"Let Me Show You"	N.Flying	Adam Argyle; Damon Sharpe; Rob Persaud; Singing Beetle	Familiar Wife OST	Korean	2018	
"Let's Get Down To It"	N.Flying	Han Seung-hun; Kim Chang-rak; Jeong Jin-wook	The Real: N.flying	Korean	2017	
"Like A Flower" 꽃)	N.Flying	Kim Su-bin; Kim Chang-rak; J.don	Spring Memories	Korean	2019	
"Like You" (좋아)	Cha Hun; Yoon Chae Kyung	Hwang Yong-ju	Woof & Meow - Do You Love Me? OST	Korean	2022	
"LOG"	N.Flying	Yoo Hwe-seung; J.don; Kim Su-bin	Everlasting	Korean	2025	
"Lonely"	N.Flying	Kim Do-hun; J.don; Lee Sang-ho	Lonely	Korean	2015	
"Lonely"	N.Flying	Kim Do-hun; J.don; Lee Sang-ho	Endless Summer	Japanese	2015	
"Love In Memory" (하나둘씩)	N.Flying	J.don; Han Seong-ho; Jeong Jin-wook; Yipro; Jacob Aaron	Everlasting	Korean	2025	
"Love Me Baby"	Yoo Hwe-seung	Han Kyung-soo; Lee Hyun-sang; Nomasgood; Tankzzo	My Reason To Die (Naver Webtoon) OST	Korean	2023	
"Love You Like That"	N.Flying	J.don; Kim Su-bin; Yui Mugino	Everlasting	Korean	2025	
"Lovefool" (팔불출)	N.Flying	BreadBeat; DJ Kayvon; Josef Melin; Wonderkid; Dalli; J.don	How Are You?	Korean	2018	
"Lover"	N.Flying	G.Gorilla	Lover	Korean	2023	
"Lupin"	N.Flying	Cha Hun; Keit; J.don; Satoshi Shibayama	Brotherhood	Japanese	2019	

== M ==
Song	Artist(s)	Writer(s)	Album/Single	Language	Year	Ref.
"Moebius" (뫼비우스)	N.Flying	J.don; Yoo Hwe-seung; Jeong Jin-wook; Yipro	Everlasting	Korean	2025	
"Moon & Cheese"	J.don	Park Su-seok; Bong Won-seok; J.don	On The Track	Korean	2021	
"Moonshot"	N.Flying	TM; J.don; Lee Hyeon-seung	Man on the Moon	Korean	2021	
"Monster"	N.Flying	Park Su-seok; J.don	Dearest	Korean	2022	
"My Dearest" (고생했어)	N.Flying	J.don; INFX	Still	Korean	2026	
"My Heart Says" (말해)	J.don	Han Seong-ho; Park Su-seok; Moon Kim	Spring of Youth OST	Korean	2025	

== O ==
Song	Artist(s)	Writer(s)	Album/Single	Language	Year	Ref.
"Oh Really." (아 진짜요.)	N.Flying	Kim Su-bin; J.don	So, Communication	Korean	2020	
"Oh Really." (아 진짜요.)	N.Flying	Kim Su-bin; J.don	So, Communication	Chinese	2020	
"Oh Yeah"	N.Flying	—N/a	One and Only	English	2014	
"Older Brother" (오빠는...)	Yoo Hwe-seung	Younee; Lee Seong-jin	Older Brother	Korean	2023	
"One N Only"	N.Flying	Inno; J.don; Han Seung-hun; Go Jin-yeong; Park Hyeon-woo	One and Only	English	2014	
"One N Only"	N.Flying	Inno; J.don; Han Seung-hun; Go Jin-yeong; Park Hyeon-woo	Awesome	Korean	2015	
"Our Country, Ordinary House, Ordinary Me" (평범한 나라 평범한 집 평범한 나)	Yoo Hwe-seung; Yoo Tae-yang; Oh Jong-hyuk	Chu Jeong-hwa; Heo Su-hyeon	Musical Secretly Greatly: The Last OST	Korean	2022	
"Our Ending" (아는 결말)	N.Flying	J.don; Han Seong-ho; Seo Yong-bae	Our Ending	Korean	2026	
"Our Ending" (아는 결말)	N.Flying	J.don; Han Seong-ho; Seo Yong-bae	Still	Korean	2026	

== P ==
Song	Artist(s)	Writer(s)	Album/Single	Language	Year	Ref.
"Pardon?" (ㅈㅅ)	N.Flying	Drew Ryan Scott; Joacim Persson; Johan Alkenäs; J.don	Yaho	Korean	2019	
"Pinhole"	N.Flying	J.don; Satoshi Shibayama; Yuzuru Kusugo	Brotherhood	Japanese	2019	
"Preview"	N.Flying	J.don; Jeong Jin-wook; Jo Se-hee	Spring Memories	Korean	2019	

== R ==
Song	Artist(s)	Writer(s)	Album/Single	Language	Year	Ref.
"R U Ready"	N.Flying	Han Seong-ho; Justin Reinstein	The Real: N.flying	Korean	2017	
"Rain"	N.Flying; Noel	Kang Kyun-sung; Tasko; JQ; Lee Ji-hye; J.don	The Call 2 Project No. 5	Korean	2019	
"Red Light"	J.don	Moon Kim; Park Su-seok; Seo Ji-eun; J.don	Tomorrow OST	Korean	2022	
"Reason"	N.Flying	—N/a	One and Only	English	2014	
"Rise Again" (사랑을 마주하고)	N.Flying	J.don; Lee Sang-ho; Seo Young-bae; Lee Hu-sang	Everlasting	Korean	2025	
"Rockstar"	N.Flying; DinDin; Muzie	DinDin; Kodeta; Muzie; J.don	The Call 2 Project No. 4	Korean	2019	
"Rooftop" (옥탑방)	N.Flying	J.don	Spring Memories	Korean	2019	
"Rooftop" (옥탑방)	N.Flying	J.don	Brotherhood	Japanese	2019	
"Rooftop Freedom" (옥탑방 프리덤)	N.Flying; UV	Park Jin-young; UV; N.Flying	The Call 2 Project No. 1	Korean	2019	
"Run"	N.Flying	J.don; Satoshi Shibayama; Yuzuru Kusugo	Brotherhood	Japanese	2019	
"Run Like This"	N.Flying	J.don; Go Jin-yeong; Kim Tae-yang; Jacob Aaron	Everlasting	Korean	2025	
"Run To You"	Yoo Hwe-seung	Luka; Yoo Su-jin; Ga-deul; Park Geun-cheol; Jeong Su-min; Yoo Yong-yeol	The Spies Who Loved Me OST	Korean	2020	
"Run With Me" (도망가자)	Yoo Hwe-seung	Sunwoo Jung-a; Kwak Eun-jeong	Run With Me	Korean	2026	

== S ==
Song	Artist(s)	Writer(s)	Album/Single	Language	Year	Ref.
"Say Goodbye" (짠해)	N.Flying	Kim Chang-rak; J.don; Jo Se-hee	The Real: N.flying	Korean	2017	
"See You Later (Sung By Seo Tae-yang)"	The Crown	Han Seong-ho; J.don; Go Jin-yeong; Sooyoon; Lvin; Benjmin; Feli Ferraro	Spring of Youth OST	Korean	2025	
"See You Later"	Two Sagye	Han Seong-ho; Ha Yoo-jun; Go Jin-yeong; Sooyoon; Lvin; Benjmin; Feli Ferraro	Spring of Youth OST	Korean	2025	
"Shameless" (뻔뻔)	N.Flying	J.don; Inno; Han Seung-hun; Kwon Kwang-jin	Lonely	Korean	2015	
"Shooting Star"	N.Flying	Yoo Hwe-seung; Kim Su-bin; Kim Jae-hyun; Seo Dong-sung; J.don; Cha Hun	Dearest	Korean	2022	
"Sing Along"	FNC Artists	Lee Hong-gi; Jung Yong-hwa	Sing Along	Japanese	2022	
"So Nice (GMF2020 ver.)"	J.don; Yoo Hwe-seung; Grand Mint Band; J_ust; Choi Nakta; Choi Ye-geun; Hynn	Lee Won-seok; Kim Jang-won; Kim Seon-il	So Nice (GMF2020 Ver.)	Korean	2020	
"So Pretty" (예쁘다 예뻐)	N.Flying	Kim Chang-rak; Kim Su-bin; Jo Se-hee	Luv Pub OST	Korean	2018	
"Sober"	N.Flying	TM; J.don; Lee Hyeon-seung	Turbulence	Korean	2021	
"Songbird"	N.Flying	J.don; Satoshi Shibayama	Brotherhood	Japanese	2019	
"Songbird"	N.Flying	J.don; Satoshi Shibayama	Everlasting	Korean	2025	
"Spring Memories" (봄이 부시게)	N.Flying	Kim Su-bin; J.don; Han Seong-ho	Spring Memories	Korean	2019	
"Spring Memories" (봄이 부시게)	N.Flying	Kim Su-bin; J.don; Han Seong-ho	Spring Memories	Chinese	2019	
"Stand By Me"	N.Flying	J.don; Satoshi Shibayama; Yuzuru Kusugo	Brotherhood	Japanese	2019	
"Stand By Me"	N.Flying	J.don; Satoshi Shibayama; Yuzuru Kusugo	Everlasting	Korean	2025	
"Star"	N.Flying	Jeung Gu-hyeon; Aseul	Lovely Runner OST	Korean	2024	
"Starlight"	N.Flying	Kim Su-bin; J.don	Starlight	Korean	2020	
"Start Over"	NA:H; Hwiyoung; J.don	Moon Kim; NA:H; Hwiyoung	lost fantasy	Korean	2024	
"Still" (잔불)	N.Flying	J.don; Han Seong-ho; Rapid; Kim Ji-hyung; Adam Seuba	Still	Korean	2026	
"Still Love You" (사랑했었다)	Yoo Hwe-seung; Lee Hong-gi	VIP	FNC Lab 'Still love you'	Korean	2018	
"Still Love You" (사랑했었다)	Yoo Hwe-seung	Ryu Jae-hyeon; Choi Seong-il	Tomorrow OST	Korean	2022	
"Still You" (아직도 난 그대를 좋아해요)	N.Flying	J.don; Kim Su-bin	Everlasting	Korean	2025	
"Sunset"	N.Flying	Yuzuru Kusugo; J.don	Yaho	Korean	2019	
"Superstar"	J.don; Cheeze	TM; J.don; Lee Hyeon-seung	On The Track	Korean	2021	

== T ==
Song	Artist(s)	Writer(s)	Album/Single	Language	Year	Ref.
"The Look In Your Eyes" (그대 눈이 내게 말해요)	Yoo Hwe-seung	Han Seong-ho; Park Su-seok	Spring of Youth OST	Korean	2025	
"The More I Love" (사랑할수록)	J.don; Yoo Hwe-seung	Kim Tae-won	Immortal Songs: Boohwal's 40th anniversary -Kim Tae-won-	Korean	2026	
"The Night" (그 밤)	N.Flying	Kim Su-bin; J.don	Dearest	Korean	2022	
"The Real" (진짜가 나타났다)	N.Flying	Choi Kap-won; Kim Do-hun; J.don; Lee Sang-ho	The Real: N.flying	Korean	2017	
"The Real" (진짜가 나타났다)	N.Flying	Choi Kap-won; Kim Do-hun; J.don; Lee Sang-ho	The Real: N.flying	Chinese	2017	
"The Way We Were" (어쩌면 가장 서툰 내가 좋았어)	N.Flying	J.don; Han Seong-ho; Seo Yong-bae; WU	Still	Korean	2026	
"The World Is Mine"	N.Flying	J.don; Satoshi Shibayama; Yuzuru Kusugo	Brotherhood	Japanese	2019	
"To You" (너에게)	N.Flying	Park Su-seok; Seo Ji-eun; J.don	Man on the Moon	Korean	2021	
"Together" (함께가요)	Yoo Hwe-seung; The One; Kim Jong-min; Gree; Parc Jae-jung; Perc%nt	Hitmaker; Lee Jong-su	Hometown Sounds OST	Korean	2018	
"Tree"	N.Flying	J.don; Kim Su-bin	Once in a BLUE MOON	Korean	2023	

== U ==
Song	Artist(s)	Writer(s)	Album/Single	Language	Year	Ref.
"Undo" (지우개)	N.Flying	Kim Su-bin; J.don	Man on the Moon	Korean	2021	
"Up All Night"	N.Flying	Adrian Mckinnon; Brad.K; Hezen; Steven Lee; J.don	How Are You?	Korean	2018	

== V ==
Song	Artist(s)	Writer(s)	Album/Single	Language	Year	Ref.
"Video Therapy"	N.Flying	TM; J.don; Lee Hyeon-seung	Turbulence	Korean	2021	

== W ==
Song	Artist(s)	Writer(s)	Album/Single	Language	Year	Ref.
"Wake Up" (나를 사랑하지 않는 너에게)	N.Flying	J.don; Yoo Hwe-seung; JEWNO	Still	Korean	2026	
"Wanna Be"	N.Flying	J.don; Satoshi Shibayama	Brotherhood	Japanese	2019	
"What's the Problem"	Cha Hun; BB_Bae; Kim Ing-ing; DDotty; Jin Lyeol ee mint_luv	BB_Bae; Kim Ing-ing; DDotty; Jin Lyeol ee mint_luv	YouTube Cypher 2021	Korean	2021	
"Winter Winter"	N.Flying	Kim Su-bin; Kim Chang-rak; J.don	Fly High Project #2 'Rooftop'	Korean	2019	
"Wonderful Night" (아름다운 밤)	N.Flying	Park Seong-yong; Im Kwang-gyun	Taxi Driver 2 OST	Korean	2023	

== Y ==
Song	Artist(s)	Writer(s)	Album/Single	Language	Year	Ref.
"Ye Lai Xiang" (야래향)	N.Flying	Lee Ching Kwang	Immortal Songs: Singing the Legend EP.449	Korean	2020	
"You"	N.Flying	Justin Reinstein; J.don	Man on the Moon	Korean	2021	
"Youth" (꽃바람)	N.Flying	Kim Su-bin; J.don	So, Communication	Korean	2020	

== Z ==
Song	Artist(s)	Writer(s)	Album/Single	Language	Year	Ref.
"Zip." (빈집)	N.Flying	TM; J.don; Lee Hyeon-seung	Man on the Moon	Korean	2021	
