= Everlasting (N.Flying album) =

Studio album by N.Flying
- Released: 28 May 2025
- Length: 39:22
- Label: FNC Entertainment

N.Flying chronology
Into You (2024)	Everlasting (2025)	In Between Seasons (2026)

Everlasting is the second Korean language studio album by the South Korean band N.Flying. The album was released on 28 May 2025.

== Background ==
On 12 May 2025, the group announced their comeback with their second studio album. This album symbolizes the group's full comeback after Cha Hun, Seo Dong-sung, and Kim Jae-hyun were discharged from the military.

On 14 May 2025, the group released the highlight medley of their album, including two Korean version songs from their first Japanese album, Brotherhood. Group leader Lee Seung-hyub was involved in the songwriting of all tracks, with the involvement of Yoo Hwe-seung in two of the tracks from this album. The group released the music video teaser of their lead track, "Everlasting", on May 23.

== Track listing ==
Everlasting track listing
No.	Title	Lyrics	Music	Arrangement	Length
1.	"Songbird" (Korean version)	J.don; Satoshi Shibayama	Satoshi Shibayama	N.Flying; Satoshi Shibayama	3:46
2.	"Everlasting" (만년설)	J.don; Kim Su-bin	J.don; Kim Su-bin	Kim Su-bin; Jo Se-hee	4:17
3.	"Rise Again" (사랑을 마주하고)	J.don; Lee Sang-ho; Seo Young-bae; Lee Hu-sang	J.don; Lee Sang-ho; Seo Young-bae; Lee Hu-sang	Lee Hu-sang	3:09
4.	"Love You Like That"	J.don	J.don; Kim Su-bin; Yui Mugino	J.don; Kim Su-bin; Jo Se-hee	3:18
5.	"Love in Memory" (하나둘씩)	J.don; Han Seong-ho	J.don; Jeong Jin-wook; Yipro; Jacob Aaron	Jeong Jin-wook; Yipro	3:09
6.	"Still You" (아직도 난 그대를 좋아해요)	J.don	J.don; Kim Su-bin	J.don; Kim Su-bin	3:04
7.	"Happy Me!" (행복해버리기)	J.don	J.don; Kim Su-bin	J.don; Kim Su-bin	2:23
8.	"Born to Be"	J.don	J.don; Kim Su-bin	J.don; Kim Su-bin	2:34
9.	"Run Like This"	J.don	J.don; Go Jin-yeong; Kim Tae-yang; Jacob Aaron	Go Jin-yeong; Kim Tae-yang	3:20
10.	"Moebius" (뫼비우스)	J.don	J.don; Yoo Hwe-seung; Jeong Jin-wook; Yipro	Jeong Jin-wook; Yipro	3:09
11.	"Log"	Yoo Hwe-seung; J.don	J.don; Kim Su-bin	J.don; Kim Su-bin	3:18
12.	"Stand by Me" (Korean version)	J.don; Satoshi Shibayama	Yuzuru Kusugo	N.Flying; Yuzuru Kusugo	3:53
Total length:					39:22

== Charts ==
Chart performance for Everlasting
Chart (2025)	Peak position
South Korean Albums (Circle)	9
