= Dearest (EP) =

EP by N.Flying
- Released: October 17, 2022
- Recorded: 2022
- Length: 19:15
- Label: FNC Entertainment
- Producer: J.Don

N.Flying chronology
Turbulence (2021)	Dearest (2022)	Once in a Blue Moon (2023)

Dearest is the eighth Korean-language EP by the South Korean band N.Flying. It was released by FNC Entertainment on October 17, 2022.

== Background ==
On September 28, 2022, it was announced that N.Flying was scheduled to release an album on October 17. The album served as the group's last comeback before the enlistment of their members, Cha Hun and Kim Jae-Hyun. On October 6, the track list for the album was released by the group. J.don was involved in writing and composing all six songs for the album. The title song for the album was "I Like You".

On October 17, the group released their album alongside the music video of the lead single.

== Track listing ==
Dearest track listing
No.	Title	Lyrics	Music	Arrangement	Length
1.	"I Like You" (폭망)	J.don	J.don; Kim Su-bin	J.don; Kim Su-bin	3:26
2.	"The Night" (그 밤)	J.don	J.don; Kim Su-bin	J.don; Kim Su-bin; Im Su-hyeok	3:16
3.	"Firefly"	J.don	J.don; Kim Su-bin	J.don; Kim Su-bin; Jo Se-hee	3:05
4.	"1" (일)	J.don	J.don; Kim Su-bin	J.don; Kim Su-bin; Jo Se-hee	3:01
5.	"Monster"	J.don	J.don; Park Su-seok	Park Su-seok; Young	3:07
6.	"Shooting Star"	J.don; Cha Hun; Kim Jae-hyun; Yoo Hwe-seung; Seo Dong-sung	J.don; Cha Hun; Kim Jae-hyun; Yoo Hwe-seung; Seo Dong-sung; Kim Su-bin	J.don; Cha Hun; Kim Jae-hyun; Yoo Hwe-seung; Seo Dong-sung; Kim Su-bin; Jo Se-hee	3:20
Total length:					19:15

== Charts ==
Chart performance for Dearest
Chart (2022)	Peak position
South Korean Albums (Circle)	7
