= Lonely (single album) =

Single album by N.Flying
- Released: October 22, 2015
- Length: 10:14
- Label: FNC Entertainment

N.Flying chronology
Awesome (2015)	Lonely (2015)	Knock Knock (2016)

Lonely is the first Korean language single album by the South Korean band N.Flying. It was released by FNC Entertainment on 22 October 2015.

== Background ==
On October 14, 2015, it was announced that N.Flying would make their comeback with a single album on October 22. It was their first comeback five months after the group's debut. Three songs were recorded for the single album, including title track "Lonely". J.don was involved in writing the lyrics for all three songs. The group held a showcase commemorating the release of their single album on October 21.

On October 22, 2015, the group released the single album along with the music video of the title track, "Lonely".

== Track listing ==
No.	Title	Lyrics	Music	Arrangement	Length
1.	"Lonely"	Kim Do-hun; J.don	Kim Do-hun; Lee Sang-ho	Lee Sang-ho	03:30
2.	"Knock Knock"	J.don; inno	Han Seung-hun; Go Jin-yeong	Han Seung-hun; Go Jin-yeong	03:29
3.	"Shameless" (뻔뻔)	J.don; inno	Han Seung-hun; Kwon Kwang-jin	Go Jin-yeong	03:14
Total length:					10:14
