= Dearest =

Dearest may refer to:

- Dearest (2012 film) (Anata e), a 2012 Japanese film directed by Yasuo Furuhata
- Dearest (2014 film) (Qin Ai De), a 2014 Chinese film directed by Peter Chan
- "Dearest" (Ayumi Hamasaki song)
- Dearest (EP), a 2022 EP by N.Flying
- "Dearest", a 1959 song by Michael Holliday
- "Dearest", a 1971 song by Bee Gees (from the Trafalgar album)
