= So, Communication =

EP by N.Flying
- Released: June 10, 2020
- Recorded: 2020
- Length: 18:32
- Label: FNC Entertainment

N.Flying chronology
It's Fine (2019)	So, Communication (2020)	Starlight (2020)

So, Communication (stylized as So, 通 (Korean: 소통, romanized: Sotong)) is the seventh Korean-language EP by the South Korean band N.Flying. It was released by FNC Entertainment on June 10, 2020.

== Background ==
On May 28, 2020, the group announced in their official social media that they would be releasing their seventh mini album on June 10, 2020. The album was the first album with their new member, Seo Dong-sung, who joined the group earlier in 2020. The title song for this mini album was also revealed, which was "Oh really.".

On June 7, the track list for the album was released. On June 8, the group released the music video for the title track, "Oh really.". The music video was released two days prior to the official release date of their album. On June 10, the group released their album, So, Communication.

== Track listing ==
So, Communication track listing
No.	Title	Lyrics	Music	Arrangement	Length
1.	"Oh really." (아 진짜요.)	J.don	J.don; Kim Su-bin	J.don; Kim Su-bin	3:15
2.	"Flower Fantasy"	J.don	J.don; Kim Su-bin	J.don; Kim Su-bin	3:40
3.	"Youth" (꽃바람)	J.don	J.don; Kim Su-bin	J.don; Kim Su-bin	3:36
4.	"I'm Gonna" (아무거나)	J.don	J.don; Park Hyun-woo; Jung Jin-wook	Park Hyun-woo; Jung Jin-wook	3:08
5.	"Last Song" (마지막 무대)	J.don	J.don; Go Jin-young	Go Jin-young	2:49
6.	"E-yo" (에요)	N.Flying	J.don; Kim Su-bin	J.don; Kim Su-bin	4:04
Total length:					18:32

== Charts ==
Chart performance for So, Communication
Chart (2020)	Peak position
South Korean Albums (Circle)	4
