= Brotherhood (N.Flying album) =

Studio album by N.Flying
- Released: May 22, 2019
- Length: 37:03
- Label: FNC Music Japan

N.Flying chronology
Spring Memories (2019)	Brotherhood (2019)	Yaho (2020)

Brotherhood is the first Japanese language studio album by the South Korean band N.Flying, released by FNC Entertainment on May 22, 2019.

== Background ==
On May 22, 2019, the group released their first full-length album in Japan, entitled Brotherhood. All members involved in writing and composing the tracks for the album.

The group also started their live tour in Japan as of the release of the album.

== Track listing ==
Brotherhood track listing
No.	Title	Lyrics	Music	Arrangement	Length
1.	"The World Is Mine"	J.don; Satoshi Shibayama	J.don; Yuzuru Kusugo	N.Flying; Yuzuru Kusugo	3:20
2.	"Stand by Me"	J.don; Satoshi Shibayama	Yuzuru Kusugo	N.Flying; Yuzuru Kusugo	3:53
3.	"Pinhole"	J.don; Satoshi Shibayama	J.don; Yuzuru Kusugo	N.Flying; Yuzuru Kusugo	3:10
4.	"Wanna Be"	J.don; Satoshi Shibayama	J.don; Yuzuru Kusugo	N.Flying; Yuzuru Kusugo	3:53
5.	"Color"	J.don; Satoshi Shibayama	J.don	N.Flying; Tienowa	3:59
6.	"Lupin"	J.don; Satoshi Shibayama	Cha Hun; J.don; Keit	N.Flying; Tienowa	3:35
7.	"Run"	J.don; Satoshi Shibayama	Yuzuru Kusugo	N.Flying; Yuzuru Kusugo	3:50
8.	"Delight"	Yoo Hwe-seung; Satoshi Shibayama	J.don	N.Flying; Tienowa	4:05
9.	"Rooftop" (Japanese version)	J.don	J.don	J.don; Kim Su-bin	3:32
10.	"Songbird"	J.don; Satoshi Shibayama	Satoshi Shibayama	N.Flying; Satoshi Shibayama	3:46
Total length:					37:03

== Charts ==
Chart performance for Brotherhood
Chart (2019)	Peak position
Japanese Albums (Oricon)	10
