= Yoon Ji-on =

South Korean actor (born 1990)

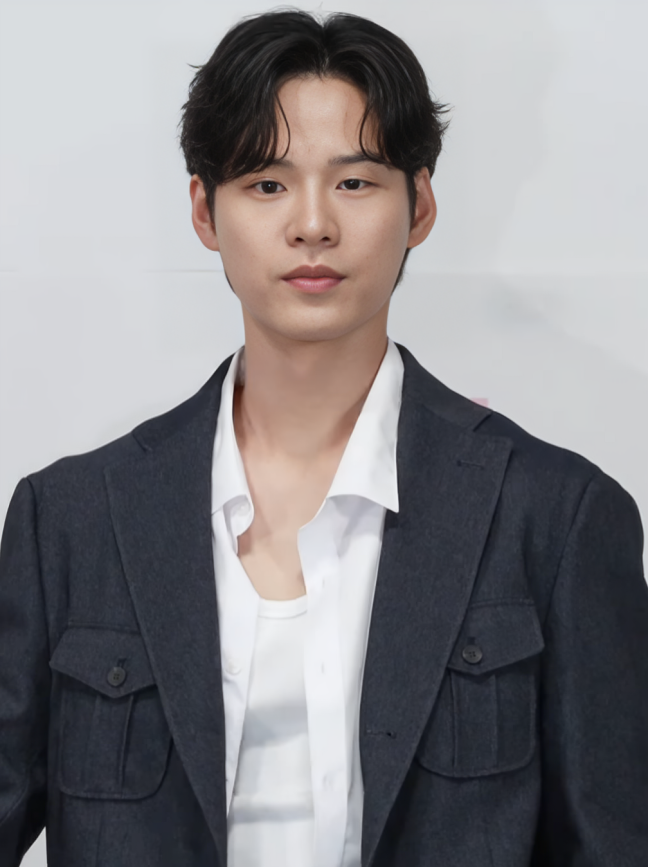
- Yoon in August 2024
- Born: Yoon Ji-on; May 19, 1990 (age 36); Incheon, South Korea
- Education: Kyonggi University – Department of Acting
- Occupation: Actor
- Years active: 2016–present
- Agent: Ieum Hashtag

Korean name
- Hangul: 윤지온
- RR: Yun Jion
- MR: Yun Chion

Yoon Ji-on (Korean: 윤지온; born May 19, 1990) is a South Korean actor. He is best known for his roles in television series such as Be Melodramatic (2019), Memorist (2020), You Are My Spring (2021), Love Catcher 1 (2018), Tomorrow (2022), and Love Next Door (2024).

== Biography and career ==
In 2013 he made his debut as an actor. After his debut as an actor, he has appeared in a number of dramas and several films including Monthly Magazine Home, You Are My Spring and Memorist. He appeared in films including Along with the Gods: The Two Worlds, Okay! Madam, and Jo Pil-ho: The Dawning Rage.

== Filmography ==
=== Film ===
Year	Title	Role	Notes	Ref.
2017	Along with the Gods: The Two Worlds	Soo-hong's legionnaire		
2019	Jo Pil-ho: The Dawning Rage	Conscripted policeman		
2020	Okay! Madam	University student		
2020	Breakup Probation, A Week	X		
2023	Dream	Entertainment company staff		

=== Television series ===
Year	Title	Role	Notes	Ref.
2016	Memory	Assistant director		
2016	Our Gap-soon	Student part timer		
2017	Hit the Top	Detective		
2017	Stranger	Cafe part timer		
2018	Mr. Sunshine	Student soldier		
2018	Dear My Room	Yang Jae-hyun		
2018	Where Stars Land	Security check employee		
2019	Be Melodramatic	Lee Hyo-bong		
2019	KBS Drama Special: "Understanding of Electric Shock"	Park Kang-sol	one act-drama	
2019	Search: WWW	Team manager		
2019	VIP	Kim Min-ki		
2019	Psychopath Diary	Joo Young-min		
2020	Memorist	Oh Se-hoon		
2020	KBS Drama Special: "Modern Girl"	Nam Woo-jin	one act-drama	
2021	You Are My Spring	Park-ho		
2021	Breakup Probation, A Week	X		
2021	Monthly Magazine Home	Jang Chan		
2021	Jirisan	Se-wook		
2022	Tomorrow	Lim Rung-gu		
2023	My Lovely Liar	Jo Deuk-chan		
2024	Serendipity's Embrace	Bang Jun-ho		
2024	The Player 2: Master of Swindlers	Kim Soo-chan		
2024	Love Next Door	Kang Dan-ho		

=== Web series ===
Year	Title	Role	Notes	Ref.
2020	Sweet Home	Hae-rang	Season 1	
2021	The Witch's Diner	Ahn Sung-ho	Cameo	

== Stage ==
=== Musical ===
Musical play performances
Year	Title		Role	Theater	Date	Ref.
Year	English	Korean	Role	Theater	Date	Ref.
2016	Superman in Love with the Moon	달을 품은 슈퍼맨	Do Hyeon	Daehangno Jayugeum Theater	November 4 – December 31, 2016	
2017	Secretly, Greatly	은밀하게 위대하게	Ree Hae-jin	Daehangno Dream Art Center 1	July 14 – October 5, 2017	
2017–2018	The Goddess is Watching	여신님이 보고 계셔	Ryoo Soon-ho	Interpark Uniplex	September 26, 2017 – January 21, 2018	
2018	Charlie Charlie	찰리찰리	Charlie	Daehangno Art Theater Small Theater	February 24 – March 11, 2018	
2018	The Goddess is Watching	여신님이 보고 계셔	Ryoo Soon-ho	Jeju Art Center	April 21–22, 2018	
2018	The Goddess is Watching	여신님이 보고 계셔	Ryoo Soon-ho	Incheon Culture & Arts Center Grand Theater	May 4–5, 2018	
2018	The Goddess is Watching	여신님이 보고 계셔	Ryoo Soon-ho	Gunpo Culture & Arts Center Suri Hall (Grand Theater)	May 18–19, 2018	
2018	The Goddess is Watching	여신님이 보고 계셔	Ryoo Soon-ho	Guri Art Hall Cosmos Grand Theater	June 1–2, 2018	
2018	The Goddess is Watching	여신님이 보고 계셔	Ryoo Soon-ho	Daegu Suseong ArtPia	June 8–10, 2018	

=== Theater ===
Theater play performances
Year	Title		Role	Theater	Date	Ref.
Year	English	Korean	Role	Theater	Date	Ref.
2013	Rise and Shine (1st Women Playwrights Festival)	제1회 여성극작가전 - 일어나 비추어라	Lee Chan-woong	Jiin Theater (formerly Algwa Hyuk Small Theater)	February 20–24, 2013	
2016	The History Boys	히스토리 보이즈	Lockwood	Baekam Art Hall	April 8 – May 8, 2016	
2022	The History Boys	히스토리 보이즈	Poshner	Doosan Art Center's Yeongang Hall	October 1 – November 20, 2022	

== Awards and nominations ==
Name of the award ceremony, year presented, category, nominee of the award, and the result of the nomination
Award ceremony	Year	Category	Nominee / Work	Result	Ref.
MBC Drama Awards	2022	Best New Actor	Tomorrow	Nominated	
