= Cha Hun =

South Korean singer and actor (born 1994)

- Born: 12 July 1994 (age 31); Seoul, South Korea
- Genres: K-pop
- Occupations: Singer; actor; guitarist
- Years active: 2015–present
- Label: FNC Entertainment
- Member of: N.Flying

Korean name
- Hangul: 차훈
- Hanja: 車勳
- RR: Cha Hun
- MR: Ch'a Hun

Cha Hun (Korean: 차훈; born July 12, 1994) is a South Korean singer and actor. He is a member of the South Korean band N.Flying.

== Career ==
In 2015, Cha debuted as the guitarist of N.Flying under FNC Entertainment.

He has run a YouTube channel, Two Idiots, together with bandmate Kim Jae-hyun since September 2018.

Cha made his acting debut in the lead role of webseries Woof & Meow – Do you Love Me? in 2022.

== Personal life ==
A self-professed "cat holic", Cha has one cat, Romang (로망).

His role models are Gun N' Roses guitarist Slash and Mark Tremonti of rock band Creed.

=== Military enlistment ===
On February 2, 2023, FNC Entertainment announced that Cha would enlist in the military on March 20, 2023, serving as a member of the military band. He was discharged in September 2024.

== Discography ==
=== Singles ===
Title	Year	Album
What's The Problem (with BB_Bae)	2021	YOUTUBE CYPHER 2021
Like You (좋아) (with Yoon Chae-kyung)	2022	Woof & Meow – Do you Love Me? OST

== Filmography ==
=== Web series ===
Year	Title	Role	Ref.
2022	Woof & Meow – Do you Love Me?	Kim Ha Joon	
2023	Romance By Romance	Nam Tae Ryeong	
