= Stage Fighter =

2024 South Korean reality dance series

- Season 4
- Promotional poster
- Native name
- Hangul: 스테이지 파이터
- RR: Seuteiji paiteo
- MR: Sŭt'eiji p'ait'ŏ
- Starring: see Contestants
- Presented by: Kang Daniel
- No. of contestants: 64
- No. of episodes: 9

Release
- Original network: Mnet
- Original release: September 24 – November 26, 2024

Season chronology
- ← Previous; Street Woman Fighter 2 Next → World of Street Woman Fighter

Stage Fighter (Korean: 스테이지 파이터) is a 2024 South Korean reality dance competition, often abbreviated as STF, is the fourth season of Street Woman Fighter franchise and co-directed by Kwon Young-chan and Choi Jung-nam. It aired on Mnet from September 24, to November 26, 2024, every Tuesday at 22:00 (KST).

== Concept ==
It revolved around 64 male dancers ranging from Korean dance, contemporary dance, and ballet, who competed against each other in a class battle.

== Cast ==
The series was presented by Kang Daniel.

Mnet announced the line-up of masters, coaches, and rehearsal director of the show:

Master

- Kim Joo-won

Rehearsal director

- Matthew Rich

Coaches

- Kim Jae-seung – Korean dance
- Jung Bo-kyung – Korean dance
- Seong Chang-yong – Contemporary dance
- Choi Soo-jin – Contemporary dance
- Ryu Hoi-woong – Ballet
- Han Seong-woo – Ballet

Special appearances

- Park Chan-wook
- Oh Na-ra
- Lee Jung-eun
- Heo Sung-tae

== Contestants ==
There were a total of 64 contestants participated in the competition and divided into three categories: Korean dance, Contemporary dance, and Ballet.

The English and Korean names of the contestants were presented in accordance with the official website.

Color key (In order of contestant's group rank on the show)

Winner contestants
Contestants eliminated in the final episode
Contestants eliminated in the second elimination round
Contestants eliminated in the first elimination round
Contestants that left the show

64 Contestants
Korean Dance
Choi Ho-jong (최호종)	Kim Jong-cheol (김종철)	Park Jun-woo (박준우)	Kim Hyo-joon (김효준)
Kim Kyu-nyeon (김규년)	Kim Si-won (김시원)	Ki Moo-gan (기무간) (Note: Ki Moo-gan was qualified for the final round but announced his own voluntary departure. As a result, Go Dong-hoon joined the finals who was initially eliminated.)	Kim Min-suk (김민석)
Kim Sang-gil (김상길)	Bang Seong-hyun (방성현)	Baek Sang-ha (백상하)	Sung Hun-mo (성훈모)
Jang Sung-bum (장성범)	Kim Min-su (김민수)	Kim In-su (김인수)	Choi Ji-won (최지원)
Park Cheol-woo (박철우)	Kim Min-seok (김민석)	Kang Seong-bae (강성배)	Shin Doung-woo (신동우)
Lee Young-woo (이영우)	Han Sang-ik (한상익)	Cho Tae-yoon (조태윤)	Choi Jong-in (최종인)
Contemporary Dance
Kim Hye-hyun (김혜현)	Kim Hyun-ho (김현호)	Yun Hyeok-jung (윤혁중)	Go Dong-hoon (고동훈)
Kim Young-woong (김영웅)	Yang Seong-yun (양성윤)	Jang June-hyuk (장준혁)	Jung Hye-seong (정혜성)
Kim Do-hyun (김도현)	Kim Seung-wook (김승욱)	Kim Jae-jin (김재진)	Ryu Tae-young (류태영)
Park Jin-ho (박진호)	Lee Jin-woo (이진우)	Ha Won-jun (하원준)	Kim Tae-gang (김태강)
Kwon Yo-han (권요한)	Kim Eun-hyuk (김은혁)	Lee Jeong-hoon (이정훈)	Han Jeong-bin (한정빈)
Oh Hyeok-heon (오혁헌)	Choo Seok-ho (추석호)	I Ban (아이반)	Lee Chang-min (이창민)
Ballet
Kang Gyeong-ho (강경호)	Kim Yu-chan (김유찬)	Jung Sung-wook (정성욱)	Shin Min-kwon (신민권)
Kim Kyung-won (김경원)	Kim Tae-seok (김태석)	Kang Yun-gu (강윤구)	Moon Jun-on (문준온)
Park Min-woo (박민우)	An Si-on (안시온)	Jeon Tae-hu (전태후)	Choi Kyu-tae (최규태)
Jung Min-chan (정민찬)	Lee Ha-nel (이하늘)	Kim Tae-yeon (김태연)	Kim Sang-young (김상영)

== Original soundtrack ==
=== Part 1 ===
Released on September 23, 2024
No.	Title	Lyrics	Music	Artist	Length
1.	"Maestro of My Heart" (produced by Czaer)	Belle; Glen Choi	Czaer; Advanced; Hwan; Choi; Eline Noelia Myreng; Vegard Hurum; Charlotte Wilson; Rachael Chevlin; Isa Guerra; Ebenezer	Kiss of Life	3:03
2.	"Maestro of My Heart" (produced by Czaer; Inst.)		Czaer; Advanced; Hwan		3:03
Total length:					6:06

=== Part 2 ===
Released on October 8, 2024
No.	Title	Lyrics	Music	Artist	Length
1.	"R.O.P (Reign of Peace)" (produced by Czaer)	Rick Bridges	Czaer; Advanced; Hwan; Ninos Hanna; Niklas Jarelius Persson; William Segerdahl	P1Harmony	3:11
2.	"R.O.P (Reign of Peace)" (produced by Czaer; Inst.)		Czaer; Advanced; Hwan		3:11
Total length:					6:22

=== Part 2.5 ===
Released on October 15, 2024
No.	Title	Lyrics	Music	Artist	Length
1.	"Bones" (produced by Czaer)	Riskypizza	Czaer; Advanced; Hwan; Riskypizza; Glen Choi; Fredrik Anstensen; Vegard Hurum	Taemin	3:46
2.	"Swan" (produced by Czaer)	Belle; Glen Choi; Renée	Czaer; Advanced; Hwan; Choi; Eline Noelia Myreng; Vegard Hurum	Miyeon	3:44
3.	"Bones" (produced by Czaer; Inst.)		Czaer; Advanced; Hwan		3:46
4.	"Swan" (produced by Czaer; Inst.)		Czaer; Advanced; Hwan		3:44
Total length:					15:01

=== Part 3 ===
Released on October 22, 2024
No.	Title	Lyrics	Music	Artist	Length
1.	"Requiem" (produced by Czaer)	Kid Milli; Justhis	Czaer; Guilty Pleasure; MBush; Kid Milli; Justhis	Kid Milli; Justhis	3:24
2.	"Requiem" (produced by Czaer; Inst.)		Czaer; Guilty Pleasure; MBush		3:24
Total length:					6:48

=== Part 4 ===
Released on October 29, 2024
No.	Title	Lyrics	Music	Artist	Length
1.	"Lion Heart" (produced by Czaer)	Glen Choi	Czaer; Guilty Pleasure; MBush; Choi; Kyler Niko; Milano	Ha Sung-woon	3:14
2.	"Seasons" (produced by Czaer)	R3d	Czaer; R3d	R3d	4:12
3.	"Dangerously" (featuring J.Don; produced by Czaer)	Riskypizza	Czaer; Riskypizza	Yoo Hwe-seung (N.Flying)	2:47
4.	"Ground" (produced by Czaer)	R3d	Czaer; R3d	Ryan Again	2:57
Total length:					13:11

=== Part 5 ===
Released on November 19, 2024
No.	Title	Lyrics	Music	Artist	Length
1.	"Addiction" (produced by Czaer)	Riskypizza	Czaer; Riskypizza	Xdinary Heroes	2:57
2.	"Ready, Set, Go" (produced by Czaer)	Chin; CK; Louie	Czaer; Advanced; Bae Hwan; Chin; CK; Louie	Homies	3:04
3.	"Savior" (produced by Czaer)	R3d	Czaer; R3d	R3d	3:14
4.	"Lullaby Baby" (produced by Czaer)	Jvcki Wai	Czaer; Haechi; Jvcki Wai	Jvcki Wai	2:41
5.	"Addiction" (produced by Czaer; Inst.)		Czaer; Riskypizza		2:57
6.	"Ready, Set, Go" (produced by Czaer; Inst.)		Czaer; Advanced; Bae Hwan		3:04
7.	"Savior" (produced by Czaer; Inst.)		Czaer; R3d		3:14
8.	"Lullaby Baby" (produced by Czaer; Inst.)		Czaer; Haechi		2:41
Total length:					23:52

=== Part 6 ===
Released on November 26, 2024
No.	Title	Lyrics	Music	Artist	Length
1.	"Checkmate" (produced by Czaer)	Glen Choi	Czaer; Advanced; Baehwan; Choi; Ninos Hanna; Niklas Jarelius Persson; William Segerdahl	Zerobaseone	3:14
2.	"Checkmate" (produced by Czaer; Inst.)		Czaer; Advanced; Baehwan; Choi; Hanna; Persson; Segerdahl		3:14
Total length:					6:28

== Viewership ==
Stage Fighter : South Korea viewers per episode (thousands)

Season	Episode number								
Season	1	2	3	4	5	6	7	8	9
1	N/A	N/A	222	219	239	200	N/A	205	N/A

Source: Audience measurement performed nationwide by Nielsen Korea.

Average TV viewership ratings
Ep.	Original broadcast date	Average audience share (Nielsen Korea)	
Ep.	Original broadcast date	Nationwide	Seoul
1	September 24, 2024	0.375% (84th)	N/A
2	October 1, 2024	0.638% (54th)	N/A
3	October 8, 2024	0.863% (18th)	1.067% (9th)
4	October 15, 2024	0.803% (27th)	N/A
5	October 22, 2024	0.724% (34th)	N/A
6	October 29, 2024	0.694% (35th)	N/A
7	November 12, 2024	0.763% (30th)	N/A
8	November 19, 2024	0.691% (36th)	N/A
9	November 26, 2024	0.593% (47th)	N/A
Average		0.683%	— (Note: Due to multiple unpublished ratings, the exact average rating is unknown.)
Special	November 5, 2024	0.564% (51st)	N/A
In the table above, the blue numbers represent the lowest ratings and the red numbers represent the highest ratings.; N/A denotes ratings that were not published.; This show aired on a cable channel/pay TV which normally has a relatively smaller audience compared to free-to-air TV/public broadcasters (KBS, SBS, MBC and EBS).
