= Memorist =

2020 South Korean television series

- Promotional poster
- Hangul: 메모리스트
- RR: Memoriseuteu
- MR: Memorisŭt'ŭ
- Genre: Crime; Mystery; Fantasy
- Created by: Studio Dragon (tvN)
- Based on: Memorist by Jae Hoo
- Written by: Ahn Do-ha; Hwang Ha-na
- Directed by: Kim Whee; Oh Seung-yeol; So Jae-hyun
- Starring: Yoo Seung-ho; Lee Se-young; Jo Sung-ha
- Country of origin: South Korea
- Original language: Korean
- No. of episodes: 16

Production
- Executive producer: So Jae Hyeon
- Running time: 60 minutes
- Production company: Studio 605

Original release
- Network: tvN
- Release: March 11 – April 30, 2020

Memorist (Korean: 메모리스트) is a 2020 South Korean television series starring Yoo Seung-ho, Lee Se-young, and Jo Sung-ha. Based on the 2016–2018 Daum webtoon of the same name by Jae Hoo, it aired on tvN from March 11 to April 30, 2020.

== Synopsis ==
With the power to read people's memories, Dong Baek solves crimes as a detective in the police force. When a string of serial murders happen, Dong Baek teams up with talented criminal profiler Han Sun-mi to stop the killer and prevent further deaths. However, as they pursue the killer, the truth about their individual troubled pasts begins to unravel, and the murders quickly become far more convoluted than anything they had foreseen.

== Cast ==
=== Main ===
- Yoo Seung-ho as Dong Baek / Sung Ju-ho

A police officer and detective who is very passionate about catching criminals. He has the supernatural ability to read a person's memories by touching their skin. As a child, he was found wandering at Dongbaek Station with no memories of his past, except for a vague recollection of witnessing a woman, presumably his mother, being murdered.

- Lee Se-young as Han Sun-mi / Kim So-mi

The youngest superintendent of Special Investigation Headquarters. She was originally a lawyer but later on became a police officer to find the truth about her father's murder that occurred 20 years ago. Her father was a leader of the Labour Union, but betrayed the workers he was supposed to protect, leading to a mass layoff.

- Jo Sung-ha as Lee Shin-woong, head of the entire police department. He is responsible for covering up the murder and rape that happened 20 years ago. He is arrested in the end for corruption.

=== Supporting ===
==== People around Dong Baek ====
- Ko Chang-seok as Gu Kyung-tan also the Old Man

Dong Baek's senior at work and also the trio's captain. He frequently complains that Dong Baek's recklessness will cause him hair loss, but continuously tries his best to help Dong Baek while also caring about him a lot.

- Jun Hyo-seong as Kang Ji-eun

An honest reporter at TVC News. She was forced by her superiors to write fake news about Dong Baek

- Yoon Ji-on as Oh Se-hoon

Dong Baek's partner and assistant. He cares a lot about Dong Baek, and tries his best to help the latter.

• Kang Min-ah as Sul Cho-won

Dong Baek's first love.

==== Special Investigation Headquarters ====
- Kim Yoon-hee as Jung Mi-ja

A criminal profiler that gathers intelligence about the serial murder case under Superintendent Han Sun-mi.

- Im Se-joo as Lee Seul-bi

A criminal profiler that gathers intelligence about the serial murder case under Superintendent Han Sun-mi.

- Jung Ha-joon as Hwang Bong-gook

A law student that become a detective. He specializes in hacking computer systems. He has a crush on Han Sun-mi, who was his lecturer from his student days, and is very loyal to her.

==== Metropolitan Police ====
- Son Kwang-up as Byun Young-soo
- Kim Seo-kyung as Im Chil-gyu
- Moon Jung-gi as Kwon Woon-jang
- Oh Chi-woon as Min Sung-han
- Park Eung-su as Jang Ki-dae

==== Jin Jae Gyu's family ====
- Jo Han-chul as Jin Jae-gyu
  - Choi Seung-yoon as young Jin Jae-gyu
  - Seo Eun-yool as child Jin Jae-gyu

The illegitimate child of a conglomerate chairman and a shaman, Jin Jae-gyu has lived a hellish life after his shaman mother died from poisoning. He was possessed by the spirit his mother served, and obtained the power to predict the future. He was a serial vigilante murderer named The Executioner, who killed people that got away with their wrongdoings, and is suspected to be The Eraser. He is also the one who killed Han Sun-Mi's father for what he did to the workers.

- Lee So-yoon as Shim Sang-ha

Jin Jae-gyu's stepdaughter, whom he loves most. As a child, she ran away from home after her mother committed suicide along with her lover, as she believed they were murdered by her stepfather.

- Kang Hyun-jung as Shim Hyo-sook

Jin Jae-gyu's wife and Sang-ha's mother. She only married Jae-gyu to take the money he inherited. She planned on killing him and leaving her daughter behind, before running away with his money and her lover, Sang-ha's biological father.

- Lee Whee-Hyang as Hwang Pil-Seon

She is Jin Jae-gyu's stepsister, a devilish woman that would do anything to protect her family's reputation. She covered up her son's crime from 20 years ago and got rid of everyone involved. She is arrested in the end.

- Ahn Jae-mo as Bang Joon-Seok

Hwang Pil-seon's only son, a former assemblyman and highly influential politician. He is the head of the gangs that raped and killed the girl named Song-A, the daughter of the chief of the fire department and Song Ju-ran's best friend. He is arrested in the end for his crimes, but commits suicide in prison out of shame.

- Kim Young-mi as Eun Soo-kyung

Bang Joo-seok's wife. She is abducted by The Eraser while being 7 months pregnant.

==== Others ====
- Hong Seung-hee as Lee Bo-yun
- Jung Shin-hye as Yoo Ah-young

Yoo Soon-nam's daughter

- Cha Mi-kyung as Mrs. Gong
- Yoo Gun-woo as Woo Seok-do

A corrupt prosecutor that tries his best to arrest and stop Dong Baek at all costs under the order of the higher-ups.

- Kim Nak-kyun as Detective
- Cha Soon-bae as Im Joong-yeon
- Jo Seok-hyun as Northern Prosecutor
- Kim Ji-in as Yoon Ye-rim

She is abducted on her way home by a serial murderer.

- Choi Seo-ryung as Kim Seo-kyung
- Lee Young-jin as Seo Hee-soo/Sung Ju-ran (ep. 12-16)
  - Jo Hye-joo as young Sung Ju-ran

Bang Joon-seok's personal maid and an accomplice of his wife's abductor. It is revealed that she is Sung Ju-ho's older sister who possesses the same memory-reading power as him, but she also possesses the ability to erase people's memories. She is the serial killer known as the Eraser.

=== Special appearances ===
- Ha Do-kwon as gang member (Ep. 1)
- Park Jin-woo as Detective (Ep. 1)
- Kim Ki-doo as Detective Yoon-young (Ep. 1)
- Choi Hee (Ep. 1)
- Jo Yi-haeng as Shin Mi-young's husband (Ep. 16)

== Production ==
The first script reading took place on December 2, 2019.

The drama serves as a reunion between Yoo Seung-ho and Lee Se-young who previously worked together on the MBC drama Missing You (2012–13).

== Original soundtrack ==
Memorist OST

Soundtrack album by Various Artists
- Released: 2020
- Genre: Soundtrack
- Languages: Korean; English
- Label: Stone Music Entertainment

=== Part 1 ===
Released on April 2, 2020
No.	Title	Lyrics	Music	Artist	Length
1.	"Til the End"	Nodded	Nodded	Lee Seung-yeol	3:22
2.	"Til the End" (Inst.)		Nodded		3:22
Total length:					6:44

=== Part 2 ===
Released on April 16, 2020
No.	Title	Lyrics	Music	Artist	Length
1.	"Memorist"	Kim Sang-woo	Kim Sang-woo	headliner	3:19
2.	"Memorist" (Inst.)		Kim Sang-woo		3:19
Total length:					6:38

Disc 2:
No.	Title	Artist	Length
1.	"The End of the Story"	Joo In Ro	3:57
2.	"Nation-certified Detective"	Joo In Ro	2:17
3.	"Clue in the Memory"	Goo Bon Choon	3:22
4.	"Suspect"	Shin Yoo Jin	2:36
5.	"Chaser"	Kim Jong Wan	3:46
6.	"Deep Scar"	Yoo So Hyun	3:30
7.	"Special Investigation Headquarter"	Kim Jeong Wan	2:26
8.	"Load of Grief"	Park Hye Min	2:47
9.	"Executor's Murder Notice"	Song Hye Bin	2:22
10.	"Chaser looking for the eyes under feet"	Kang Min Goo	3:58
11.	"Black Ambition"	Jo Han Na	2:25
12.	"Double-edged Sword"	Goo Bon Choon	4:46
13.	"Sad Song"	Kim Jong Wan	4:52
14.	"Red Herring"	Kang Min Goo	2:27
15.	"Meticulous Intelligence Investigation"	Jo Han Na	3:23
16.	"Unsolved Murder Case"	Goo Bon Choon	4:49
17.	"Kid of Darkness"	Kim Jong Wan	4:16
18.	"The Name of Prophecy"	Yoo So Hyun	3:34
19.	"Joint Operation"	Park Hye Min	2:25
20.	"Link point it scattered cases"	Song Hye Bin	3:27
21.	"Dongbaek Trio"	Park Hye Min	2:15
22.	"Secret Cooperation"	Joo In Ro	2:10
23.	"Fruit of the poisonous tree"	Kang Min Goo	3:37
24.	"Victim's Tears"	Shin Yoo Jin	4:11
25.	"Profiler"	Shin Yoo Jin	2:42
26.	"Bloody Baptism"	Joo In Ro	3:38
27.	"Host of Chaos"	Joo In Ro	2:23
28.	"Convicter"	Yoo So Hyun	3:56
29.	"Hammer Killer"	Goo Bon Choon	4:30
30.	"Covered Truth"	Jo Han Na	2:27
31.	"Supernatural Investigation"	Song Hye Bin	3:24
32.	"Two Way Pursuit"	Joo In Ro	3:04
33.	"Questionable Start"	Yoo So Hyun	2:09
34.	"Dongbaek Marking"	Jo Han Na	2:33
35.	"Same bed, Different dreams"	Seo Ye Rin	3:08
36.	"Memory Scan"	Joo In Ro	3:49
Total length:			1:40:57

== Viewership ==
Memorist : South Korea viewers per episode (thousands)

Season	Episode number																Average
Season	1	2	3	4	5	6	7	8	9	10	11	12	13	14	15	16	Average
1	806	681	870	824	840	887	852	695	552	784	632	648	575	717	558	942	741

Source: Audience measurement performed nationwide by Nielsen Korea.

Average TV viewership ratings
Ep.	Original broadcast date	Title	Average audience share (Nielsen Korea)	
Ep.	Original broadcast date	Title	Nationwide	Seoul
1	March 11, 2020	Claw Hammer (장도리)	3.272%	3.811%
2	March 12, 2020	The Red Pig (붉은 돼지)	2.762%	3.098%
3	March 18, 2020	Baptized in Blood (피의 세례)	3.434%	4.052%
4	March 19, 2020	Double-Edged Sword (양날의 검)	3.175%	3.624%
5	March 25, 2020	Prayer for Protection (수호기도)	3.198%	3.491%
6	March 26, 2020	The Second Man (세컨드 맨)	3.287%	3.489%
7	April 1, 2020	Memory Eraser (기억 지우개)	2.851%	2.847%
8	April 2, 2020	The Red Herring (붉은 청어)	2.693%	2.772%
9	April 8, 2020	The Pupil Under One's Foot (발 믣의 눈동자)	2.259%	2.267%
10	April 9, 2020	Trauma Trigger (트라우마 방아쇠)	2.894%	3.408%
11	April 15, 2020	A Deep Wound (깊은 흉터)	2.384%	2.393%
12	April 16, 2020	The Child of Darkness (어둠의 아이)	2.809%	3.291%
13	April 22, 2020	The Name of the Prophecy (예언의 이름)	2.199%	2.273%
14	April 23, 2020	Two Layers of Evil (두 겹의 악)	2.701%	2.403%
15	April 29, 2020	Flesh and Blood (피 붙이)	2.160%	2.195%
16	April 30, 2020	The Power of Memories (기억의 힘)	3.293%	3.408%
Average			2.836%	3.051%
In the table above, the blue numbers represent the lowest ratings and the red numbers represent the highest ratings.; This drama aired on a cable channel/pay TV which normally has a relatively smaller audience compared to free-to-air TV/public broadcasters (KBS, SBS, MBC and EBS).
