= Tomorrow (South Korean TV series) =

2022 South Korean television series

- Promotional poster
- Hangul: 내일
- Hanja: 來日
- RR: Naeil
- MR: Naeil
- Genre: Fantasy
- Created by: Studio N
- Based on: Tomorrow by Llama
- Developed by: Hong Sook-woo (MBC)
- Written by: Park Ran-i; Park Ja-kyung; Kim Yu-jin
- Directed by: Kim Tae-yoon; Sung Chi-wook
- Starring: Kim Hee-sun; Rowoon; Lee Soo-hyuk; Yoon Ji-on
- Music by: Jo Seung-woo; Won Ho-kyung
- Country of origin: South Korea
- Original language: Korean
- No. of episodes: 16

Production
- Executive producer: Lee Tae-kyung (CP)
- Producers: Shin In-soo; Kwon Mi-kyung
- Running time: 70 minutes
- Production companies: Studio N; Super Moon Pictures

Original release
- Network: MBC TV
- Release: April 1 – May 21, 2022

Tomorrow (Korean: 내일; RR: Naeil) is a South Korean television series directed by Kim Tae-yoon and Sung Chi-wook, starring Kim Hee-sun, Rowoon, Lee Soo-hyuk, and Yoon Ji-on. Based on a Naver webtoon that was published in 2017, the series is about the angels of the underworld who used to guide the dead, but now save those who want to die. It premiered on MBC TV on April 1, 2022, and aired every Friday and Saturday at 21:50 (KST) with 16 episodes. It is also available for streaming on Netflix.

== Synopsis ==
Choi Joon-woong (Rowoon) is a young job seeker who is unable to secure a job. Through an accident, he meets the grim reapers Koo Ryeon (Kim Hee-sun) and Lim Ryung Gu (Yoon Ji-on) who have the task of preventing suicide, and works with them as the youngest contract worker in the crisis management team of death angels.

== Cast ==
=== Main ===
- Kim Hee-sun as Koo Ryeon
  - Kal So-won as young Koo Ryeon

A grim reaper and the leader of the crisis management team of Jumadeung. Park Joong-Gil's wife in her past life.

- Rowoon as Choi Joon-woong
  - Kim Ra-on as young Choi Joon-woong

A young job seeker and new contract employee of Jumadeung.

- Lee Soo-hyuk as Park Joong-gil
  - Park Sang-hoon as young Park Joong-gil

The leader of the Grim Reaper management team who guides the dead in Jumadeung, and is a strict principled person. Koo Ryeon's husband in his previous life.

- Yoon Ji-on as Lim Ryeong-gu
  - Seo Yoon-hyuk as young Lim Ryeong-gu

The assistant manager of the crisis management team of Jumadeung.

- Kim Hae-sook as The Jade Emperor

The director at Jumadeung, the underworld monopoly.

=== Supporting ===
==== People related to Jumadeung ====
- Moon Seo-yoon as Jeon Su-in

A member of the Grim Reaper management team of Jumadeung.

- Kim Nu-ri as Jang Jae-hee

A member of the Grim Reaper management team of Jumadeung.

==== People around Choi Joon-woong ====
- Yoon Yoo-sun as Jeong-im, Choi Joon-woong's mother
- Kim Seo-yeon as Choi Min-yeong, Joon-woong's younger sister.
- Kwon Hyuk as Joon Woong's father

=== Extended ===
Noh Eun-bi's incident (Ep. 1–2)

- Jo In as Noh Eun-bi

A workaholic television playwright who is a victim of school violence.

- Kim Chae-eun as Kim Hye-won

A popular webtoon writer who is the perpetrator of school violence.

- Jung Yun-sol as Kwon Dan-ah, Noh Eun-bi's friend.
- Seo Young-bin as a producer of TV station where Noh Eun-bi works.
- Jang Ji-eun as a friend of Kim Hye-won.
- Sun Arin as a friend of Kim Hye-won.

Namgoong Jae-su's incident (Ep. 3–4)

- Ryu Sung-rok as Namgoong Jae-su, Joon-woong's close friend.
  - Kim Ji-hoon as young Namgoong Jae-su
- Kim Kyung-min as Namgoong Hyun, Namgoong Jae-su's father
- Im Sae-byeok as Namgoong Jae-su's mother
- Kwak Ja-hyung as Kim Woong-jun, Joon-woong's another face.

Kang Woo-jin's incident (Ep. 4–5)

- Kang Seung-yoon as Kang Woo-jin, a singer-songwriter
  - Shin Seo-woo as young Kang Woo-jin
- Lee No-ah as Heo Na-young

Kang Woo-jin's wife who died in an accident.

- Min Eung-Sik as Heo Na-young's father
- Kang Joo-Hee as Heo Na-young's mother

Lee Young-cheon's incident (Ep. 6)

- Jeon Moo-song as Lee Young-cheon, former Korean War Veteran.
  - Lee Jung-jun as young Lee Young-cheon
- Jung Chung-gu as owner of the junkyard
- Lee Kyu-Seop as a gangster
- Kim Jeong-cheol as Kim Dong-shil, Lee Young-cheon's fellow soldier in the battlefield

Shin Ye-na's incident (Ep. 7)

- Han Hae-in as Shin Ye-na, an employee at SP beauty marketing team
- Kim Min-so as Jung Bo-ram, an employee at SP beauty marketing team
- Kim Heung-rae as SP beauty marketing team leader
- Yang Jae-hyun as Kim Yong-jun, an employee at SP beauty
- Jo Seung-yeon as Lee Dong-ja, a working mother
- Noh Ha-yeon as Yewon, Lee Dong-ja's daughter.

Suicide Broker's incident (Ep. 8)

- Min Jin-woong as Song Jin-ho (a.k.a. Betamale)
- Jung Se-Hyun as Sunset
- Shin Chi-Young as Goodbye

Kim Kong's incident (Ep. 9)

- Kim Kong, an old dog who doesn't have much time left and ran away from home
- Cha Hak-yeon as Kim Hoon, the owner of Kong
  - Lee Kyung-hoon as young Kim Hoon

Twin siblings' incident (Ep. 10)

- Gong Jae-hyun as Cha Yoon-jae, the twin brother of a sexual assault victim.
- Lee Ji-won as Cha Yoon-hee, Yoon Jae's twin sister, the victim of sexual assault.
- Kim Jun-kyung as Tak Nam-il, a medical student and the perpetrator of sexual assault.

Lim Yu-hwa's incident (Ep. 11–12)

- Min Ji-ah as Lim Yu-hwa
  - Jeon Eun-joo as young Lim Yu-hwa (last incarnation)

A woman who lost her newborn child. She was Lim Ryung-gu's mother in her previous life.

- Lee Ki-hyuk as Park Hae-il, Lim Yu-hwa's husband
- Jung Soo-han as Kwon Sang-soo, an employee at Jumadeung's sales department

Yoo Bok-hee's incident (Ep. 13)

- Kim Yong-rim as Yoo Bok-hee
  - Park Yoon-young as young Yoo Bok-hee

A woman who thinks her friend Yun-i became a comfort woman due to her fault.

- Kim Young-ok as Lee Jeong-moo
  - Han Ji-hyo as young Lee Jeong-moo

A comfort woman victim of Japanese army who knows about Yun-i.

- Park Hee-jeong as Jeon Bo-yun / Yun-i
  - Lee Seo-yeon as Yun-i

A newly employed Grim Reaper at management team of Jumadeung. She was Yun-i, Yoo Bok-hee's friend in her previous life.

Koo Ryeon's past life (Ep. 14)

- Koo Si-yeon as Gop-dan, Koo Ryeon's personal maid
  - Kim Si-eun as young Gop-dan
- Jung Jae-eun as Koo Ryeon's mother-in-law
- Ha Dong-joon as Koo Ryeon's father

Ryu Cho-hui's incident (Ep.15–16)

- Kim Si-eun as Ryu Cho-hui, a popular idol actress. She was Koo Ryeon's maid, Gop-dan in her previous life.
- Lee Hye-won as Park Song-yi, a member of girl group Ravina. She is in a conflict with Ryu Cho-hui.
- Kang Joo-eun as Ryu Cho-hui's younger sister
- Shin Jun-chul as Ryu Cho-hui's father

=== Special appearances ===
- Jeong Jun-ha as Chief Jeong, Noh Eun-bi's favorite comedian (Ep. 1–2)
- Bae Jeong-nam as a scammer (Ep. 1)
- Ryu Hye-rin as Scammer (Ep. 3)
- Park Hoon as Ha Dae-soo, King Yeomra the Great – the king of the hell (Ep.15–16)

== Production ==
On January 18, 2022, the script reading site was revealed by releasing photos.

== Original soundtrack ==
=== Part 1 ===
Released on April 2, 2022
No.	Title	Lyrics	Music	Artist	Length
1.	"Red Light"	J.don	Park Soo-seok; Seo Ji-eun; Moon Kim	J.don	3:09
2.	"Red Light" (Inst.)		Park Soo-seok; Seo Ji-eun; Moon Kim		3:09
Total length:					6:18

=== Part 2 ===
Released on April 9, 2022
No.	Title	Lyrics	Music	Artist	Length
1.	"Don't Leave Me, My Love" (내 곁에서 떠나가지 말아요)	Han Kyung-Hoon	Han Kyung-Hoon	An Da-eun	3:46
2.	"Don't Leave Me, My Love" (내 곁에서 떠나가지 말아요; Inst.)		Han Kyung-Hoon		3:46
Total length:					7:32

=== Part 3 ===
Released on April 16, 2022
No.	Title	Lyrics	Music	Artist	Length
1.	"My Loneliness Calls You" (나의 외로움이 널 부를 때)	Jo Dong-hee	Jo Dong-ik	Suran	4:13
2.	"My Loneliness Calls You" (나의 외로움이 널 부를 때; Inst.)		Jo Dong-ik		4:13
Total length:					8:26

=== Part 4 ===
Released on May 2, 2022
No.	Title	Lyrics	Music	Artist	Length
1.	"Still love you" (사랑했었다)	VIP	VIP	Yoo Hwe-seung (N.Flying)	4:12
2.	"Still love you" (사랑했었다; Inst.)		VIP		4:12
Total length:					8:24

=== Part 5 ===
Released on May 7, 2022
No.	Title	Lyrics	Music	Artist	Length
1.	"My Only One" (내게 단 한 사람)	Han Seung-hoon; Aiming	Han Seung-hoon; Aiming	Ben	4:22
2.	"My Only One" (내게 단 한 사람; Inst.)		Han Seung-hoon; Aiming		4:22
Total length:					8:44

== Ratings ==
Average TV viewership ratings (nationwide)
Ep.	Original broadcast date	Average audience share (Nielsen Korea)
1	April 1, 2022	7.6% (8th)
2	April 2, 2022	3.4% (25th)
3	April 8, 2022	5.4% (13th)
4	April 9, 2022	4.1% (17th)
5	April 15, 2022	3.5% (22nd)
6	April 16, 2022	2.7% (28th)
7	April 22, 2022	3.6% (21st)
8	April 23, 2022	3.0% (27th)
9	April 29, 2022	2.9% (27th)
10	April 30, 2022	2.5% (33rd)
11	May 6, 2022	2.9% (23rd)
12	May 7, 2022	2.7% (29th)
13	May 13, 2022	2.3% (28th)
14	May 14, 2022	3.1% (24th)
15	May 20, 2022	2.4% (27th)
16	May 21, 2022	2.8% (28th)
Average		3.4%
In the table above, the blue numbers represent the lowest ratings and the red numbers represent the highest ratings.; N/A denotes ratings that were not released.
