= Yaho (EP) =

EP by N.Flying
- Released: October 15, 2019
- Recorded: 2019
- Length: 17:04
- Label: FNC Entertainment

N.Flying chronology
| Brotherhood (2019) | Yaho (2019) | Doll/Kick-Ass (2019) |

Yaho (stylized as 夜好 (Korean: 야호, romanized: Yaho)) is the sixth Korean-language EP by the South Korean band N.Flying. It was released by FNC Entertainment on October 15, 2019.

== Background ==
On September 27, 2019, FNC Entertainment revealed that the group would have a comeback in October 2019. According to the agency, the album consisted of self-composed songs by the group's leader, Lee Seung-hyub.

On September 28, the group announced the album name and title track for the album. The album was named Yaho, and "Good Bam" served as the title track.

On October 1, the track list for the album was released. The group officially released their album on October 15. The music video for their title track was also revealed on the same day.

== Track listing ==
Yaho track listing
| No. | Title | Lyrics | Music | Arrangement | Length |
|---|---|---|---|---|---|
| 1. | "Good Bam" (굿밤) | J.don | J.don; Justin Reinstein; Lee Woo-min | Justin Reinstein; Lee Woo-min | 3:30 |
| 2. | "Autumn Dream" | J.don | J.don; Kim Su-bin | J.don; Kim Su-bin | 3:24 |
| 3. | "Pardon?" (ㅈㅅ) | J.don | J.don; Joacim Persson; Johan Alkenas; Drew Ryan Scott | Joacim Persson; Johan Alkenas | 2:49 |
| 4. | "4242" | Han Seong-ho; J.don; Kim Su-bin | Josef Melin; Dillon Dixon | Josef Melin | 4:02 |
| 5. | "Sunset" | J.don | J.don; Yuzuru Kusugo | Yuzuru Kusugo | 3:19 |
| Total length: | | | | | 17:04 |

== Charts ==
Chart performance for Yaho
| Chart (2020) | Peak position |
|---|---|
| South Korean Albums (Circle) | 3 |
