= Man on the Moon (N.Flying album) =

Studio album by N.Flying
- Released: June 7, 2021
- Length: 33:44; 42:59 (repackaged edition)
- Label: FNC Entertainment

N.Flying chronology
Starlight (2020)	Man on the Moon (2021)	Amnesia (2021)

Repackaged edition cover

Man on the Moon is the first Korean language studio album by the South Korean band N.Flying, released by FNC Entertainment on 7 June 2021.

== Background ==
On May 21, 2021, the group announced their comeback with their first studio album after six years of debut. The title song for the album was "Moonshot". The group held a showcase on the release of the album on June 7, 2021.

On September 27, 2021, the group announced that they would be releasing a repackage album entitled Turbulence. "Sober" was selected as the title track of the repackage album. An online comeback talk show was held in light of the group's comeback.

== Track listing ==
Man on the Moon
No.	Title	Lyrics	Music	Arrangement	Length
1.	"Moonshot"	J.don	J.don; Lee Hyeon-seong; TM	Lee Hyeon-seong; TM	3:00
2.	"Ask"	J.don; Cha Hun	J.don; Cha Hun; Kim Su-bin	J.don; Kim Su-bin; Kwon Su-hyeon	3:24
3.	"Comma," (쉼표)	J.don	J.don; Kim Su-bin	J.don; Kim Su-bin; Kwon Su-hyeon	3:08
4.	"Undo" (지우개)	J.don	J.don; Kim Su-bin	J.don; Kim Su-bin	3:07
5.	"You"	J.don	J.don; Justin Reinstein	Justin Reinstein	3:24
6.	"Blue Scene" (파란 배경)	J.don; Seo Dong-sung	J.don; Yoo Hwe-seung; Seo Dong-sung; Park Su-seok; Seo Ji-eun	Park Su-seok; Seo Ji-Eun	3:04
7.	"Fate" (이 별 저 별)	J.don	J.don; Kim Su-bin	J.don; Kim Su-bin	3:31
8.	"Zip." (빈집)	J.don	J.don; Lee Hyeon-seung; TM	Lee Hyeon-seung; TM	3:40
9.	"To You" (너에게)	J.don	J.don; Park Su-seok; Seo Ji-eun	Park Su-seok; Seo Ji-eun	3:16
10.	"Flashback"	J.don; Yoo Hwe-seung	J.don; Yoo Hwe-seung	J.don; Yoo Hwe-seung; Go Jin-yeong	4:07
Total length:					33:44

Turbulence – repackaged
No.	Title	Lyrics	Music	Arrangement	Length
1.	"Sober"	J.don	J.don; Lee Hyeon-seong; TM	Lee Hyeon-seong; TM	3:11
2.	"Into Bloom" (피었습니다.)	J.don	J.don	Lee Hyeon-seong; TM; Hwang Tae-yeong	3:11
3.	"Video Therapy"	J.don	J.don; Lee Hyeon-seong; TM	Lee Hyeon-seong; TM	2:51
4.	"Moonshot"	J.don	J.don; Lee Hyeon-seong; TM	Lee Hyeon-seong; TM	3:00
5.	"Ask"	J.don; Cha Hun	J.don; Cha Hun; Kim Su-bin	J.don; Kim Su-bin; Kwon Su-hyeon	3:24
6.	"Comma," (쉼표)	J.don	J.don; Kim Su-bin	J.don; Kim Su-bin; Kwon Su-hyeon	3:08
7.	"Undo" (지우개)	J.don	J.don; Kim Su-bin	J.don; Kim Su-bin	3:07
8.	"You"	J.don	J.don; Justin Reinstein	Justin Reinstein	3:24
9.	"Blue Scene" (파란 배경)	J.don; Seo Dong-sung	J.don; Yoo Hwe-seung; Seo Dong-sung; Park Su-seok; Seo Ji-eun	Park Su-seok; Seo Ji-Eun	3:04
10.	"Fate" (이 별 저 별)	J.don	J.don; Kim Su-bin	J.don; Kim Su-bin	3:31
11.	"Zip." (빈집)	J.don	J.don; Lee Hyeon-seung; TM	Lee Hyeon-seung; TM	3:40
12.	"To You" (너에게)	J.don	J.don; Park Su-seok; Seo Ji-eun	Park Su-seok; Seo Ji-eun	3:16
13.	"Flashback"	J.don; Yoo Hwe-seung	J.don; Yoo Hwe-seung	J.don; Yoo Hwe-seung; Go Jin-yeong	4:07
Total length:					42:59
