= Kim Jae-hyun =

South Korean actor and singer

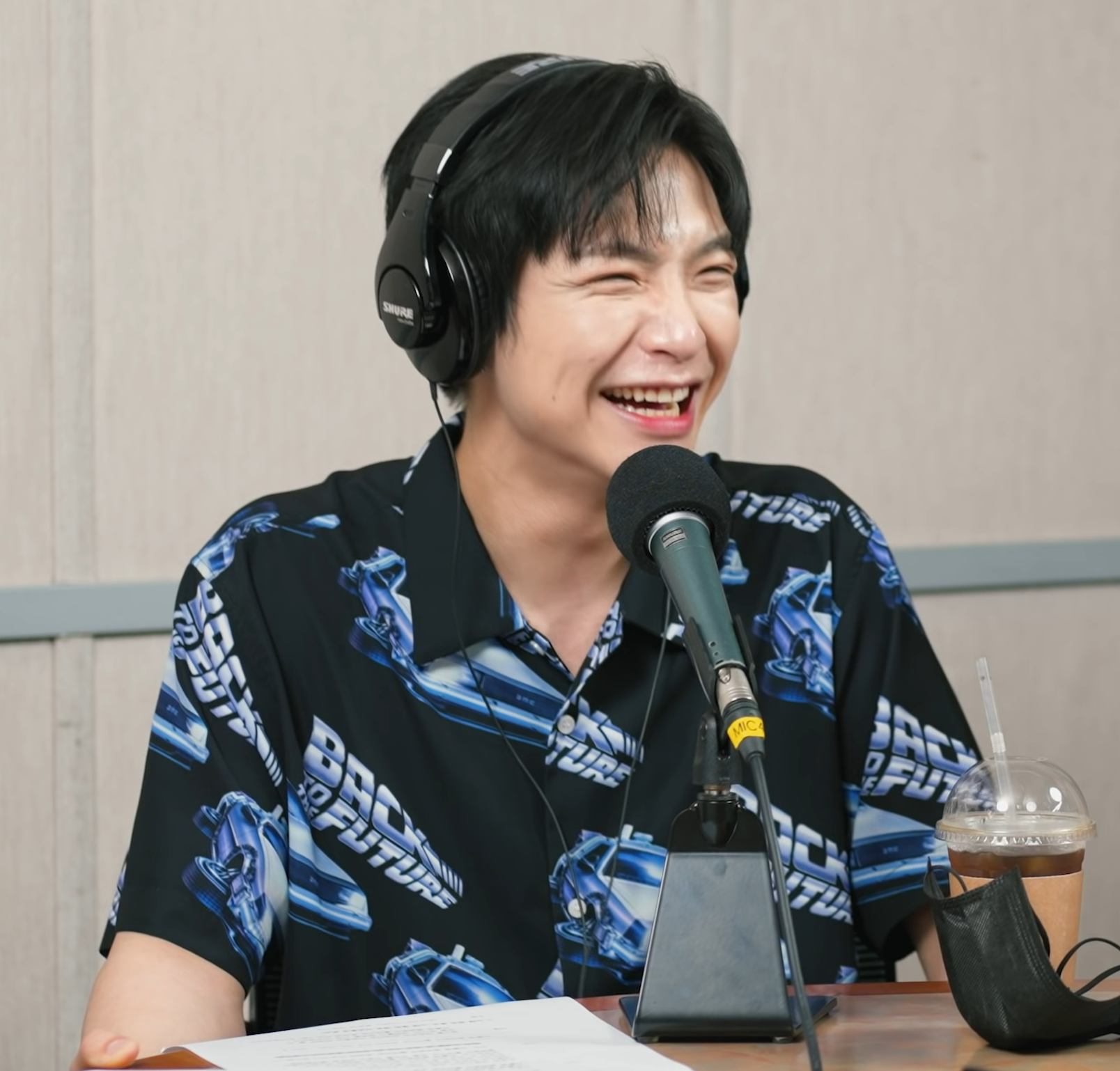
- Kim in June 2021
- Born: 15 July 1994 (age 32); Seoul, Mapo-gu, South Korea
- Education: Kyung Hee Cyber University
- Occupations: Actor; model; singer
- Years active: 2011–present
- Agent: FNC Entertainment
- Relatives: Kim Jae-kyung (sister)
- Musical career
- Genre: K-pop
- Instruments: Vocals; drums
- Years active: 2013–present
- Label: FNC Entertainment
- Member of: N.Flying

Korean name
- Hangul: 김재현
- Hanja: 金在玹
- RR: Gim Jaehyeon
- MR: Kim Chaehyŏn

Kim Jae-hyun is a South Korean drummer, actor, model and singer. He is known for his roles in dramas such as Modern Farmer, Sisters-in-law and Kimi to Sekai ga Owaru Hi ni: Season 1. He is a member of the South Korean band N.Flying.

== Personal life ==
He studied at Kyung Hee Cyber University and his older sister Kim Jae-kyung is also an actress and singer, who was member of Rainbow.

=== Military service ===
On April 6, 2023, FNC Entertainment announced that Kim will enlist in for the mandatory military service on May 25, 2023, and undergo basic military training before serving as a public service worker.

== Filmography ==
=== Film ===
Year	Title	Role	Notes	Ref.
2023	The Ghost Station	Choi Woo-won		

=== Television series ===
Year	Title	Role	Notes	Ref.
2014	Modern Farmer	Park Hong-goo		
2016	Weightlifting Fairy Kim Bok-joo	Kim Jae-hyeon		
2017–2018	Band of Sisters	Jae-hyun		
2017	Sisters-in-law	Kim Tae-gi		
2019	Miss Lee	Idol star	Cameo	
2021–2022	Love You as the World Ends	Yoon Min-jun / mysterious man	Season 1–3	
2026	Absolute Value of Romance	Noh Da-ju		

=== Web series ===
Year	Title	Role	Ref.
2016	88 Street	Na Woo-sung	
2019	All-Boys High	Nam-goo	
2020	Big Picture House	Gong Sung-woo	
2020	Half-Fifty	Cha Jin-woo	
