= N.Flying =

South Korean rock band

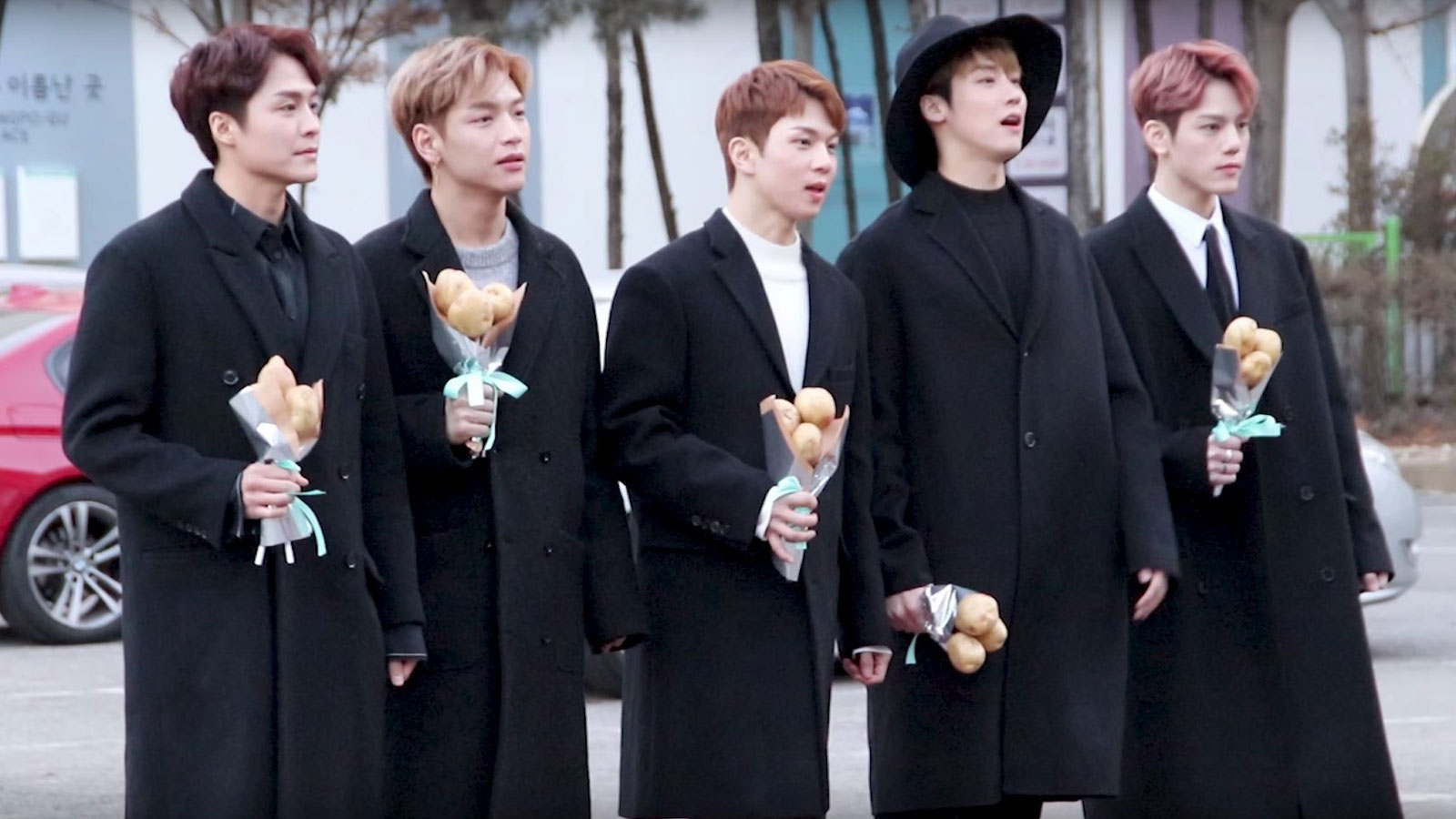
- N.Flying in 2018

Background information
- Origin: Seoul, South Korea
- Genres: Rap rock; Pop rock; Alternative rock
- Years active: 2013–present
- Labels: FNC; Virgin
- Members: Lee Seung-hyub; Cha Hun; Kim Jae-hyun; Yoo Hwe-seung; Seo Dong-sung
- Past members: Kwon Kwang-jin
- Website: www.fncent.com/NFLYING/b/introduce/1559 nflying-official.jp

N.Flying (Korean: 엔플라잉, Japanese: エヌフライング; short for New Flying which also means 'new wings' or 'new escape') is a South Korean rap rock band formed by FNC Entertainment in 2013. The group released its first digital indie single "Basket" in Japan on October 1, 2013, with the four-member line-up of Kwon Kwang-jin, Lee Seung-hyub, Cha Hun and Kim Jae-hyun. The group officially debuted in Korea on May 20, 2015, with the EP Awesome. A fifth member, Yoo Hwe-seung was added to the band in June 2017. Kwang-jin left the group on December 26, 2018, and was replaced by Seo Dong-sung on January 1, 2020.

== History ==
=== Pre-debut ===
In 2009, Kwon Kwang-jin originally debuted as the bassist of labelmate CNBLUE. However, due to personal circumstances, Kwang-jin left the band in late September. In January 2011, Kwang-jin returned to train under FNC Entertainment meeting trainees Seung-hyub, Jae-hyun and Cha Hun. Prior to the debut of N.Flying, lead vocal Park Rai-On left the band in early 2013 due to mandatory military service in his native country of Singapore. FNC Entertainment subsequently confirmed that his contract was terminated to make way for the group's debut. The remaining trainees would go on to form N.Flying.

In 2013, Lee Seung-hyub appeared in Juniel's music video titled Pretty Boy, playing her love interest she meets at a café.

Yoo Hwe-sung was previously introduced as a male trainee to represent FNC on the Mnet survival show, Produce 101 Season 2. He finished in 39th place and hence did not become a member of the produced boy group, Wanna One.

Seo Dong-sung was first introduced in FNC's reality show Cheongdam-dong 111, as part of Kokoma Band (literally, "Little Kids' Band"), along with actor Kwak Dong-yeon, KNK's Oh Heejun and Omega X's Lee Hwichan. Then he was introduced as the leader and member of NEOZ Band through survival show d.o.b. (dance or band), to compete against the trainees in NEOZ Dance (later known as SF9) for the chance to debut as a group, but eventually losing to NEOZ Dance who won the public voting. In May 2017, FNC announced that the NEOZ Band would debut as HONEYST before they disbanded two years later. In 2019, Dongsung joined N.Flying activities as a session bassist prior to his official debut with the band in 2020.

=== 2013–2014: Japanese debut with Basket, One and Only and delayed debut in Korea ===
N.Flying held their first performance at Shibuya CYCLONE on September 28, 2013. On October 1, they released their first indie single album titled Basket and performed as the opening act at F.T. Island's 'Replay' Zepp tour. BASKET peaked at number two on Tower Records weekly singles chart, number two on Oricon Indies weekly singles chart and number four on Oricon daily singles chart. The band continued doing live gigs at live clubs and also performed as opening act at CNBLUE's 'One More Time' Arena Tour. On November 14, N.Flying did their first one-man live at Live Space Halot.

On January 1, 2014, N.Flying released their second Japanese indie single album titled One and Only. The album hit No.1 on Tower Records chart its second day of release. They made their first television appearance on the 7th episode of FNC's reality drama, tvN's Cheongdam-dong 111. As a sequel of the show, N.Flying revealed their debut story in March 2014 which aired on the same channel. On January 29, it was announced that N.Flying had been appointed as the new endorsement model of Buckaroo Jeans. In the final episode of their reality show, 'Cheongdamdong111: N.Flying's Way of Becoming a Star', Seung-hyub was appointed as the leader of N.Flying. In March, they accompanied labelmate F.T. Island to be their opening act at the latter's Singapore concert. N.Flying was supposed to make their Korean debut in 2014 but it was delayed after the leader of the band, Seung-hyub, injured his knee in July.

=== 2015–2016: Debut in Korea with Awesome and Lonely ===
On May 11, 2015, FNC Entertainment launched a teaser homepage for N.Flying's upcoming Korean debut. It is also revealed that their debut EP Awesome will be released on May 20 along with the title song's music video. On May 12, FNC Entertainment announced that N.Flying will be releasing a Chinese version of Awesome simultaneously with the Korean version on May 20 and Japanese version was planned to be released in August. On May 19, 2015, FNC Entertainment released the music video teaser for Awesome. A day later, FNC Entertainment released the full music video features AOA's Kim Seolhyun as the lead role. On October 12, FNC Entertainment released mysterious teaser "Lonely 2015.10.22". A day later, FNC Entertainment confirmed that N.Flying would be releasing their first single album, Lonely, on October 22. On October 15, N.Flying released individual member teasers. From October 18 to October 20, N.Flying released teaser music video. On October 20, N.Flying confirmed their first single album track list and released highlight medley. N.Flying's first single album Lonely was released on October 22.

In April 2016, N.Flying performed their debut song Awesome at KCON in Japan.

=== 2017–2018: New member Yoo Hwe-seung, The Real: N.Flying, The Hottest, How Are You?, Fly High Project and Kwangjin's departure ===
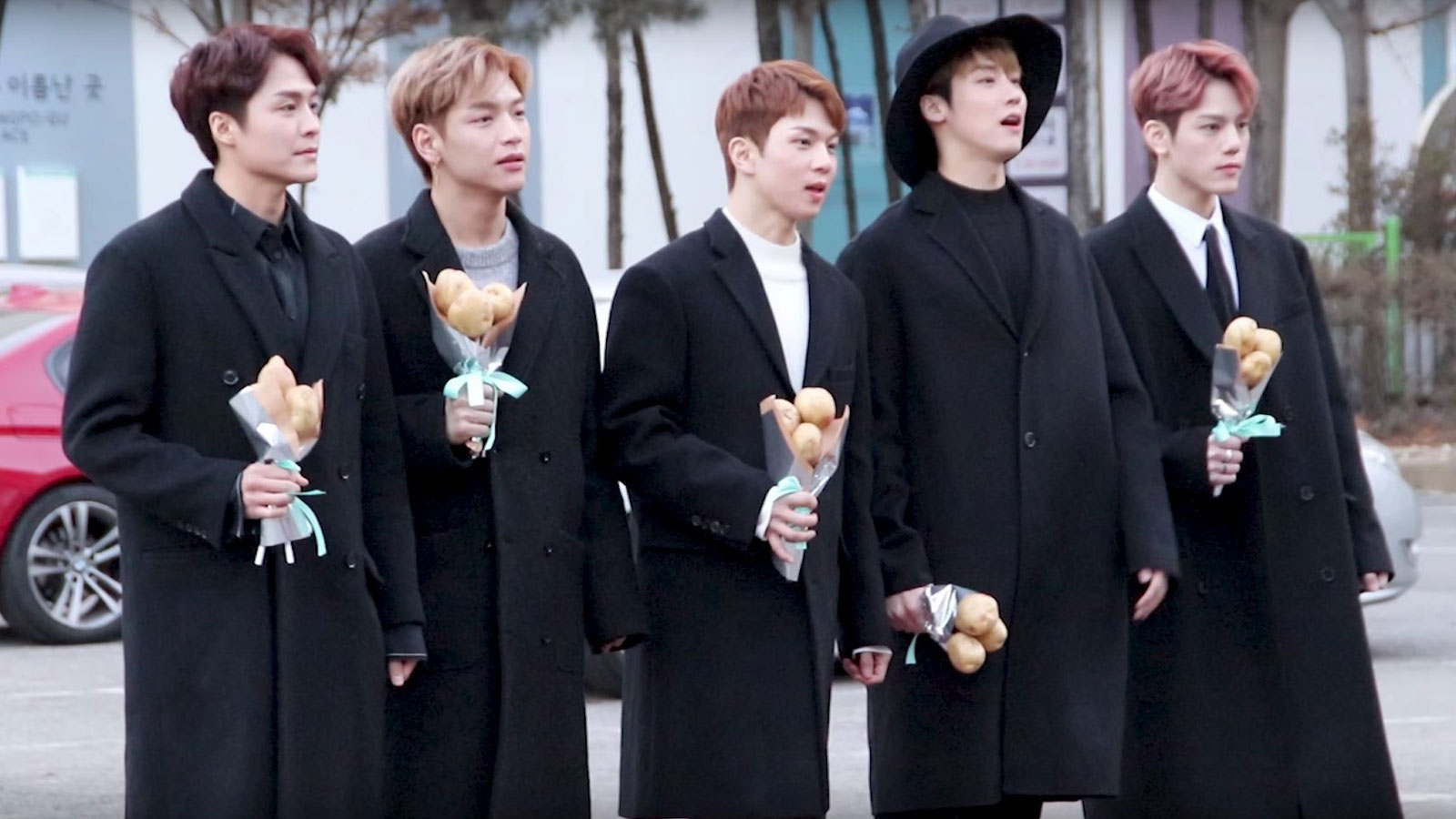
N.Flying in 2018

In February 2017, FNC Entertainment announced that the group would undergo member changes before their comeback. On June 19, 2017, it was announced that former Produce 101 Season 2 contestant Yoo Hwe-seung would be joining the group. On July 23, FNC Entertainment opened N.Flying's teaser site for their August comeback. The agency released teaser images and videos from July 23 to July 31. On August 2, their second EP The Real: N.Flying with the title track lead single "The Real" was released.

On January 3, 2018, N.Flying released their third EP The Hottest with the lead single "Hot Potato". On May 16, they released their fourth EP How Are You?. N.Flying announced a year-long project, Fly High Project with the aim of introducing more people to the band's potential and music. The members will be participating in the planning and production of the project. On October 26, 2018, they released the track called "Like a Flower". N.Flying held a concert entitled "N.Flying 1st Livehouse Tour - THE REAL IV" on December 5 and 7 in Japan. Following the concluding of the concert, N.Flying were announced that would be held a Japanese concert "2019 LIVE IN JAPAN -BROTHERHOOD-" in Tokyo on June 7, 2019, to commemorate the release of their first Japanese album Brotherhood. On December 19, 2018, it was announced that Kwang-jin would voluntarily take a break from the group due to arising allegations of inappropriate behavior online. He later left the group on December 26, 2018.

=== 2019: Breakthrough, Spring Memories, and Yaho ===
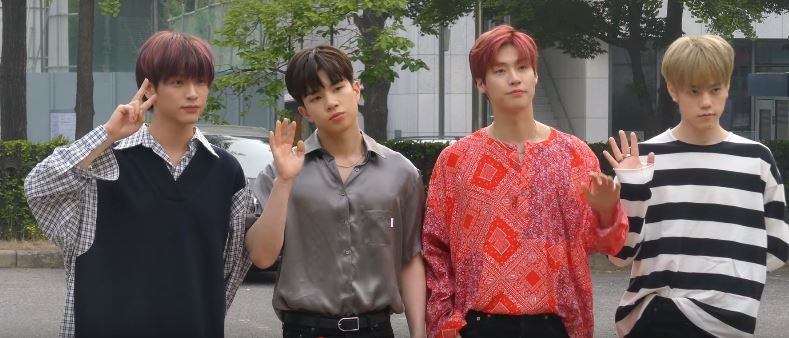
N.Flying in 2019

On January 2, N.Flying remained as a four-member band with their single "Rooftop" through Fly High Project #2. Following the release, their concert series "N.Flying Fly High Project Note 2 2019" was held on January 19 at MUV Hall. "Rooftop" first entered the lower ranks of Korean music charts and soon after there had concluded their promotions on music shows in early March, the song gained sudden popularity and went viral after an anonymous person shared it to an online community. "Rooftop" later went on to first place on all major Korean music charts and topped Gaon's weekly digital chart for two consecutive weeks and its monthly digital chart for the month of March. On March 5, N.Flying winning their first ever music show on The Show, followed by Inkigayo on March 17.

On April 24, N.Flying released their fifth EP Spring Memories with the title track "Spring Memories" through Fly High Project #3. The EP included six songs including their previous tracks, "Like a Flower" and "Rooftop". Following the conjunctions of the project release, a concert series was held, entitled "N.Flying Fly High Project Note 3" on April 29 at MUV Hall. The album debuted at 5th place on Gaon.

In June, N.Flying's first world tour entitled "2019 Live Up All Night" was announced to be held in Bangkok on June 20 and Hong Kong on August 10, and in Paris on September 22.

N.Flying held their solo concert series "N.Flying Fly High Project Note 4" on July 20 at Yes24 Live Hall.

On October 15, N.Flying released their sixth EP Yaho with the lead track "Good Bam". The group held their solo concert series, "N.Flying Fly High Project Note 5" at Haneulyeon Theatre, Busan Cinema Center on November 23 and 24.

=== 2020–2022: New member Dong-sung, So, Communication, Man on the Moon, Turbulence and Dearest ===
On January 1, 2020, former Honeyst leader and bassist Seo Dong-sung was officially announced to joined the group as bassist through fancafe post by N.Flying leader Seung-hyub and later was confirmed by FNC. Dongsung had previously joined the group activities since summer 2019 as a supporting member. N.Flying held their solo concert series "N.Flying Fly High Project Note 6" on February 1 and 2 at Yes24 Live Hall, concluding the Fly High Project that began at the start of 2019. On June 10, N.Flying released their seventh EP So, Communication with "Oh Really." serving as the album's lead single. On July 24, N.Flying released an animated MV for their special digital single, "Starlight". N.Flying held a late-night online concert series called "Noob Con", on July 25 and August 2.

On February 19, 2021, all five members renewed their contract with FNC Entertainment. On June 7, N.Flying released their first Korean studio album, Man on the Moon with "Moonshot" serving as the album's lead single. On October 6, N.Flying released the repackaged version of their first Korean studio album Turbulence, with "Sober" serving as the album's lead single.

On April 6, 2022, N.Flying announced that they would hold a solo concert, "Let's Meet and Talk" as part of the Sangsang Madang Music Trip. The concert was held at the KT&G Sangsang Madang Hongdae Live Hall in Seoul on the 6 and 7 May, 13 to 14 May at the KT&G Sangsang Madang Busan Live Hall, and 20 to 21 May at the KT&G Sangang Madang Chuncheon Sound Hall. In August, N.Flying held a solo concert "2022 N.Flying LIVE '&CON2'" at YES24 Live Hall in Gwangjin-gu, Seoul for two days, dated on August 6 and 7. The concert on 7 August was broadcast live. In September, the poster for the eighth EP, Dearest was released through the group's official social media. They made a comeback on October 17, with title song "I Like You". The group held their first Zepp tour, entitled "N.Flying 2020 ZEPP TOUR "Amnesia"" in Japan. The concert was originally planned to be held in 2020, but was delayed due to COVID-19. They performed at Zepp Haneda, Tokyo on October 9, and Zepp Namba, Osaka on October 11.

=== 2023–2024: First US tour, military service, Once in a BLUE MOON and Into You ===
On November 11, 2022, N.Flying announced that would hold a US tour titled "DWUW: Do What You Want" in 2023. From January 13 to January 22, 2023, they performed in six cities - New York, Chicago, San Juan, Atlanta, Houston and Los Angeles. They later added concert dates under the same title in Taipei and Macau, which were held on April 15 and 23 respectively.

On February 2, 2023, FNC Entertainment confirmed that Cha Hun would enlist in the military on March 20, 2023. After completing basic training, he would be sent to the Army Military Music Unit. On March 24, the agency stated on their official fan cafe that Seo Dong-sung would enlist on May 8, 2023. On April 6, FNC Entertainment announced that Kim Jae-hyun would enlist in the military on May 25 and undergo basic military training before serving as a public service worker.

On May 20, 2023, in honour of their 8th anniversary, N.Flying released a digital single album titled "Once in a BLUE MOON" containing two tracks, "Blue Moon" and "Tree".

On May 26, 2023, FNC announced that the remaining two active members, Lee Seung-hyub and Yoo Hwe-seung, would go on tour. The first concert of their "FOREST OF 2RAVELERS" tour was held in Hong Kong on June 24.

On June 25, N.Flying released a new digital single entitled "Into You". The song first made its appearance in the "2024 N.Flying Live Hide-Out" concert before the official release.

On September 19, 2024, Cha Hun was discharged from his mandatory military service. On November 7, 2024, Dongsung was discharged from his mandatory military service.

=== 2025–present: Everlasting and world tour ===
On February 24, 2025, Jaehyun was the final member to be discharged from his mandatory military service.

Following the end of the members' military service period, the full group performed at music festivals and university festivals around Korea. From May 9–11, they kickstarted their solo concert series "2025 N.Flying LIVE '&CON4'" in Olympic Hall in Seoul where they notably previewed the songs "Everlasting", "Moebius", and "Run Like This", from their upcoming album.

Shortly after celebrating their 10th debut anniversary, N.Flying released their 2nd full-length Korean album, "Everlasting" on May 28, 2025 with a title track of the same name. The album contained 12 tracks including the Korean versions of "Songbird" and "Stand By Me" which were originally released in their 2019 Japanese album "Brotherhood". On June 10, N.Flying won on the music show The Show, for their song "Everlasting".

As of August 2025, the band is touring "2025 N.Flying LIVE '&CON4'" in various cities in USA with upcoming dates around Europe, Asia, Oceania and South America till January 2026. They are also scheduled for various festival performances in Korea during the year.

== Members ==
=== Current ===
- Lee Seung-hyub (이승협) – leader, rap, vocals, guitars, piano, keyboards (2013–present)
- Cha Hun (차훈) – guitars (2013–present)
- Kim Jae-hyun (김재현) – drums (2013–present)
- Yoo Hwe-seung (유회승) – vocals (2017–present) guitars (2025–present)
- Seo Dong-sung (서동성) – bass (2020–present)

=== Former ===
- Kwon Kwang-jin (권광진) – bass (2013–2018)

== Discography ==
Korean albums

- Man on the Moon (2021)
- Everlasting (2025)

Japanese albums

- Brotherhood (2019)

== Filmography ==
=== Television ===
- Cheongdam-dong 111 (2014)
- Cheongdam-dong 111: N.Flying's Way of Becoming a Star (2014)
- One Night Study (2015)

=== Web series ===
- Seung-hyub's Summer Camp (2018)
- Seung-hyub's Summer Camp Season 2 (2019)
- Seung-hyub's Winter Camp (2020)
- Seung-hyub's Summer Camp Season 3 (2020)
- Seung-hyub's Fall Camp (2020)
- Seung-hyub's Summer Camp Season 4 (2021)
- Seung-hyub's Fall Camp − Picnic (2021)
- Seung-hyub's Summer Camp Season 5 (2022)
- Seung-hyub's Summer Camp Season 6 (2025)

=== Music videos ===
Title	Year	Director(s)
"Awesome"	2015	
"Lonely"	2015	
"Knock Knock"	2016	
"Endless Summer"	2016	
"The Real"	2017	
"Hot Potato"	2018	
"How R U Today"	2018	
"So Pretty"	2018	
"Like a Flower"	2018	
"Rooftop"	2019	Lee Hae-jin (Zanybros)
"Pinhole"	2019	
"Spring Memories"	2019	
"Leave It"	2019	
"Good Bam"	2019	
"Amnesia"	2020	
"Oh Really."	2020	
"Flower Fantasy"	2020	
"Starlight"	2020	
"Moonshot"	2021	
"Sober"	2021	
"The Night"	2022	
"I Like You"	2022	
"Blue Moon"	2023	
"Star"	2024	
"Into You"	2024	
"Everlasting"	2025	
"In Between Seasons"	2026	

== Concerts and tours ==
=== Headlining tours ===
Korean tours

- 2018 N.Flying Live 'Summer Feeling' (2018)
- THE HOTTEST: N.Flying (2018)
- N.Flying FLY HIGH PROJECT NOTE3. Spring Memories (2019)
- N.Flying FLY HIGH PROJECT NOTE4. Again, Summer (2019)
- N.Flying FLY HIGH PROJECT NOTE.5 Yaho (2019)
- N.Flying FLY HIGH PROJECT NOTE6. FLY HIGH (2020)
- Small Theater Concert: Let's Meet and Have Some Talk (2022)
- &CON − Man on the Moon (2022)
- &CON2 (2022)
- &CON3 (2023)
- 2023 N.Flying CONCERT 'ㅋㅎㅎ' (2023)
- 2023 SEUNG HYUB & HWE SEUNG of N.Flying LIVE 'FOREST OF 2RAVELERS' (2023)
- &CON4: FULL CIRCLE (2025)
- &CON5: into REM (2026)

Japan tours

- N.Flying 1st Livehouse Tour - THE REAL IV (2018)
- N.Flying 2019 Live in Japan -BROTHERHOOD- (2019)
- N.Flying 2019 1st Hall Live in Japan (2019)
- N.Flying 2020 ZEPP TOUR "Amnesia" (2022)

International tours

- 2019 N.Flying Live 'UP ALL NIGHT' (2019)
- 2022 N.Flying Live 'Into The Light' (2022)
- 2023 N.Flying Live Tour 'DWUW: Do What You Want' (2023)
- 2023 N.Flying Live &CON3 in Hong Kong (2023)
- 2023 SEUNG HYUB & HWE SEUNG of N.Flying LIVE 'FOREST OF 2RAVELERS' (2023)
- 2024 SEUNG HYUB & HWE SEUNG of N.Flying Live 'WE'RE HERE' (2024)
- 2024/2025 N.Flying Live 'HIDE-OUT' (2024–2025)
- 2025 N.Flying Live 'Full Circle' (2025)

Affiliated tours

- 2013 FNC Kingdom in Japan − Fantastic & Crazy (2013)
- 2014 FNC Kingdom in Japan − Fantastic & Crazy (2014)
- 2014 FNC Kingdom in Japan − Starlight (2014)
- 2015 FNC Kingdom (2015)
- 2016 FNC Kingdom − Creepy Nights (2016)
- 2017 FNC Kingdom − Midnight Circus (2017)
- 2019 FNC Kingdom − Winter Forest Camp (2019)
- 2022 FNC Kingdom − Star Station (2022)
- 2023 FNC Band Kingdom (2023)
- 2023 FNC Kingdom – The Greatest Show (2023)
- 2024 FNC Band Kingdom (2024)
- 2024 FNC Kingdom – Sing Sing Sing (2024)
- 2025 FNC Kingdom – Amazing Wonderland (2025)
- 2025 FNC Band Kingdom (2025)
- 2025 FNC Band Kingdom in Taiwan (2025)
- 2025 FNC Band Kingdom in Hong Kong (2025)

== Awards and nominations ==
Name of the award ceremony, year presented, award category, nominee and results
Award	Year	Category	Nominee / Work	Result	Ref.
Brand of the Year Awards	2019	Band of the Year	N.Flying	Won	
D Awards	2025	Delights Blue Label	N.Flying	Won	
D Awards	2025	Best OST	N.Flying	Won	
Gaon Chart Music Awards	2019	Discovery of the Year – Band	N.Flying	Won	
Japan Gold Disc Award	2017	Best Three New Artists – Asia	N.Flying	Won	
Korea First Brand Awards	2020	Idol Band Award	N.Flying	Won	
MAMA Awards	2015	Best New Artist – Male	N.Flying	Nominated	
MAMA Awards	2019	Best Band Performance	"Rooftop"	Nominated	
MAMA Awards	2020	Best Band Performance	"Oh Really!"	Nominated	
MAMA Awards	2024	Best Band Performance	"Into You"	Nominated	
MAMA Awards	2024	Song of the Year	"Into You"	Nominated	
MAMA Awards	2025	Best Band Performance	"Everlasting"	Nominated	
MAMA Awards	2025	Song of the Year	"Everlasting"	Nominated	
Melon Music Awards	2019	Song of the Year (Daesang)	"Rooftop"	Nominated	
Melon Music Awards	2019	Best Rock Award	"Rooftop"	Won	
Soribada Best K-Music Awards	2019	Rising Hot Star Award	N.Flying	Won	
The Fact Music Awards	2019	Band Performer of the Year	N.Flying	Won	
