= Yoo Hwe-seung =

South Korean singer and actor (born 1995)

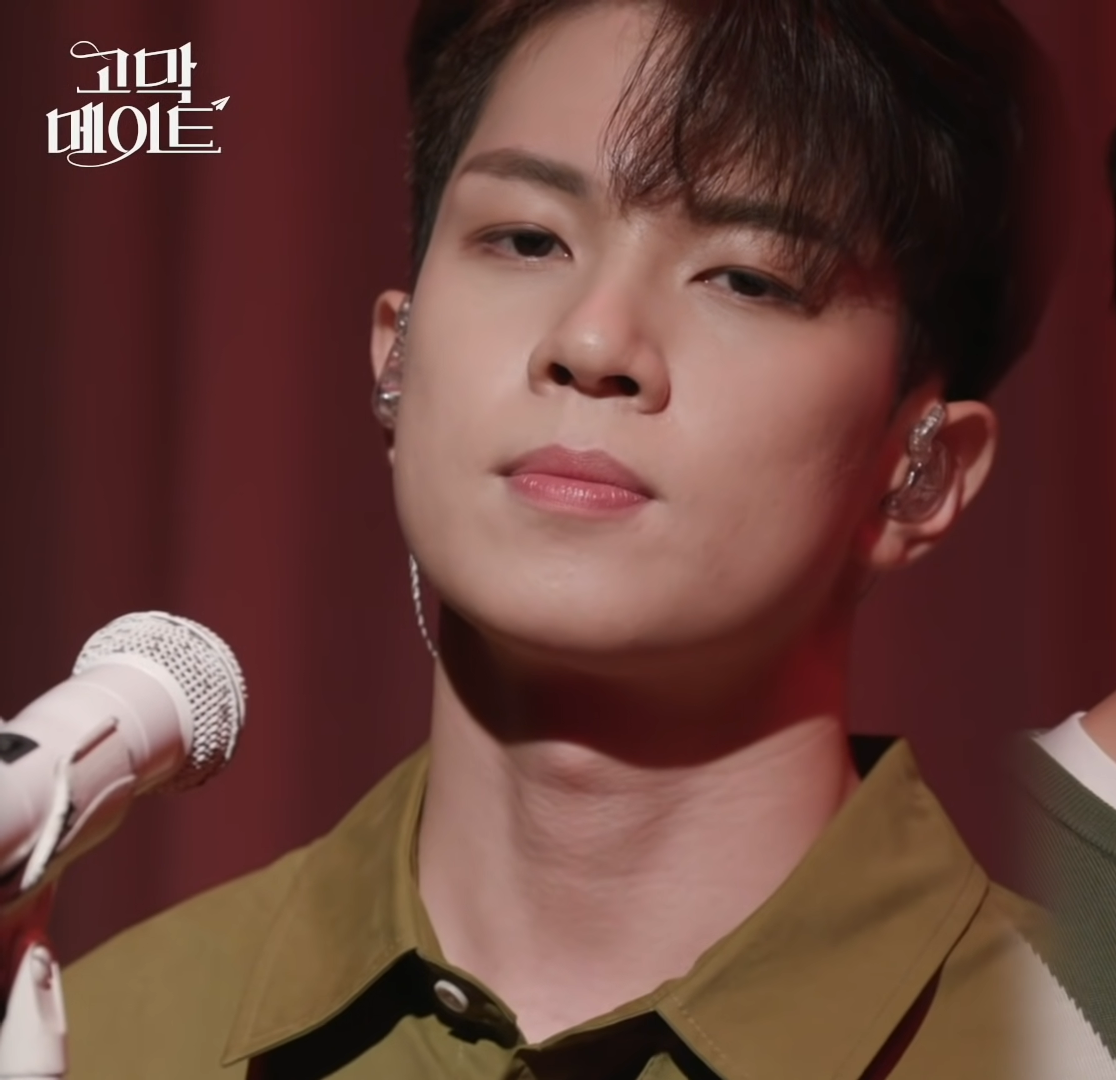
- Yoo in June 2021

Background information
- Born: 28 February 1995 (age 31); Seoul, South Korea
- Genre: K-pop
- Occupations: Singer; musical theatre actor
- Instruments: Vocals; guitar
- Years active: 2017–present
- Label: FNC Entertainment
- Member of: N.Flying

Korean name
- Hangul: 유회승
- Hanja: 柳會勝
- RR: Yu Hoeseung
- MR: Yu Hoesŭng

Yoo Hwe-seung (Korean: 유회승; born February 28, 1995) is a South Korean singer and musical theatre actor known for his work as a vocalist of the South Korean band N.Flying.

== Career ==
=== Pre-debut ===
Yoo signed with FNC Entertainment as a trainee in October 2016.

=== 2017: Produce 101, Debut with N.Flying and Original soundtrack ===
Yoo participated in Produce 101 Season 2, in which he ended up at 39th place. On June 19, it was announced that Yoo would be joining N.Flying as their newest member. He made his official debut as a member and main vocalist of N.Flying on August 2 with the group's second mini album, The Real: N.Flying. Yoo released his first solo original soundtrack, entitled "Another Day", for the South Korean drama Criminal Minds on September 14.

=== 2018–present: Solo activities and musical roles ===
In April 2018, Yoo participated in King of Masked Singer. He first appeared in episode 147, which he showed himself as "Gameboy". He successfully entered the final round in which he was able to challenge the king, but was defeated by the king. In February 2023, Yoo returned to the King of Masked Singer stage as "First Place Trophy", and this time he was successful in ascending the throne. He became the 63rd king in the history of the show and served as the king of the 194th to 197th generations.

Yoo released the track "Still Love You" as part of his collaboration with Lee Hong-gi of F.T. Island under FNC LAB.

In 2019, Yoo made his solo appearance in KBS's music competition program, Immortal Songs 2 in 2019. He received his first ever overall win in the program on October 19, 2019, with a total vote of 432. He performed a cover of Queen's "We Are The Champions", which earned him the win.

In October 2019, Yoo announced his musical debut for the musical We Will Rock You, starting from December 2019. He played as the male lead, Galileo in his debut play.

== Personal life ==
Yoo finished his mandatory military service before his debut.

Yoo has three older sisters.

== Discography ==
=== Singles ===
Title	Year	Album
"Still Love You" (with Lee Hong-gi)	2018	FNC LAB 'Still Love You'
"Expectation"	2018	Expectation
"Delinquent" (with Sway D)	2019	The Master of Producer Part 3
"So Nice" (GMF2020 Ver.) (with Grand Mint Band)	2020	So Nice (GMF2020 Ver.)
"Farewell Under the Sun" (with HYNN)	2021	You Hee Yul's Sketchbook with You: 75th Voice 'Sketchbook X Yoo Hwe Seung (N.Flying), HYNN'
"Older Brother"	2023	Older Brother
"Brother"	2023	The Seasons Vol II. 7 <AKMU's Long day Long night> ReːWake x Yoo Hwe Seung
"I Still Love You" (with Monday Kiz, DK, Bang Ye-dam, Woody)	2024	I Still Love You
"Hate and Miss You"	2024	Hate and Miss You
"Change"	2025	Change
"Run With Me"	2026	Run With Me

=== Soundtrack appearances ===
Title	Year	Peak chart positions	Album
Title	Year	KOR	Album
"Another Day"	2017	—	Criminal Minds OST Part.2
"If You Were Me" (with Jimin and Yuna)	2018	—	A Korean Odyssey OST Part.5
"Together" (with The One, Kim Jong-min, Gree, Parc Jae-jung, Perc%nt)	2018	—	Hometown Sounds OST
"Run to You"	2020	—	The Spies Who Loved Me OST Part.3
"Still Love You"	2022	—	Tomorrow OST Part.4
"Our Country, Ordinary House, Ordinary Me" (with Oh Jong-hyuk and Yoo Tae-yang)	2022	—	Musical Secretly Greatly: The Last OST
"Fight On"	2022	—	Doctor Lawyer OST Part.3
"Destiny"	2023	—	Elsword OST: Destiny
"Garosugil at Dawn (2023)" (with Baek Z Young)	2023	—	My Love OST
"Love Me Baby"	2023	—	My Reason to Die (Naver Webtoon) OST Part.2
"I Think I Did" (그랬나봐)	2024	35	Lovely Runner OST Part.6
"Dangerously (Prod. Czaer)" (with J.don)	2024	—	Stage Fighter(STF) Original Vol.4
"The Look In Your Eyes" (그대 눈이 내게 말해요)	2025	—	Spring of Youth OST Part.7

=== Other appearances ===
List of non-single guest appearances, showing year released and album name
Title	Year	Album
"Heavenly Fate (Live ver.)" (with Park Ki-young)	2025	Mask Singer 10th Anniversary Special Album (Live Version)

== Filmography ==
=== Television show ===
Year	Title	Role	Notes	Ref.
2017	Produce 101 Season 2	Contestant	Finished in 39th place	
2018	King of Mask Singer	Contestant	as "Gameboy" (episode 147–148)	
2023	King of Mask Singer	Contestant	as "First Place Trophy" (episode 392–401)	

== Musical theatre ==
Year	Title	Role	Ref.
2019	We Will Rock You	Galileo Figaro	
2020	Blazing Sonata	S	
2021	Wonder Ticket - The Village with the Guardian Tree	Pungbaek	
2021–2022	KLIMT: Into the Time of His Soul	Egon Schiele	
2022	Secretly Greatly: The Last	Ri Hae-jin	
2022	Wonder Ticket - Resurrection of Guardian Tree	Pungbaek	
2023	Mozart!	Wolfgang Amadeus Mozart	
2024	Next to Normal	Gabe	

== Awards and nominations ==
Name of the award ceremony, year presented, category, nominee of the award, and the result of the nomination
Award ceremony	Year	Category	Nominee / Work	Result	Ref.
Korea Grand Music Awards	2024	Best OST	"I Think I Did"	Won	
