= Lee Seung-hyub =

South Korean singer and actor (born 1992)

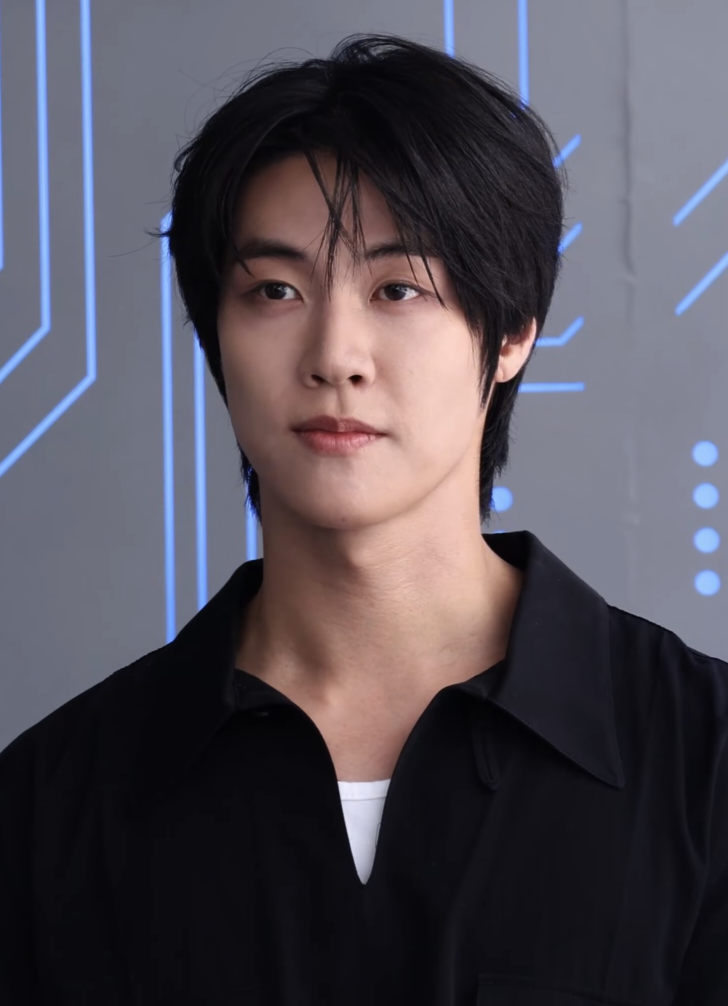
- Lee in June 2026
- Born: October 31, 1992 (age 33); Daegu, South Korea
- Other name: J.Don
- Occupations: Singer; instrumentalist; actor; songwriter
- Years active: 2013–present
- Musical career
- Genres: K-pop; hip hop; rap rock; alternative rock
- Instruments: Vocals; guitar; piano
- Labels: FNC; Virgin
- Member of: N.Flying

Korean name
- Hangul: 이승협
- RR: I Seunghyeop
- MR: I Sŭnghyŏp

Lee Seung-hyub (Korean: 이승협; born October 31, 1992) is a South Korean singer, songwriter and actor. Lee officially debuted in 2013 and rose to prominence as the leader of the South Korean band N.Flying. He is best known for his acting roles in television series Lovely Runner (2024) and Love Next Door (2024).

== Career ==
=== 2013–2015: Career beginnings ===
Lee began his first appearance with the member of N.Flying on September 28, 2013 in the band's first performance at Shibuya CYCLONE. The band's later release several indie single in Japan prior plans to made domestic debut in April 2014. The plans was postponed after Lee had sustained a knee injury.

FNC announced Lee and former AOA member Jimin to formed unit Jimin N J.don as the first runner of FNC's N Project with release single "God" on April 28, 2015. The song's music video was based on Game of Thrones.

Lee finally made his debut with N.Flying in South Korea on May 20, 2015.

In August 2015, he was selected as muse for clothing brand Buckaroo with Seolhyun of AOA.

=== 2016–present: Acting roles and solo debut ===
In 2016, Lee made a special cameo appearance in the South Korean drama Entertainer.

He made his web drama debut in the series All the Love in the World: Season 3, in which he portrayed as Dr. Lee Seung-hyub.

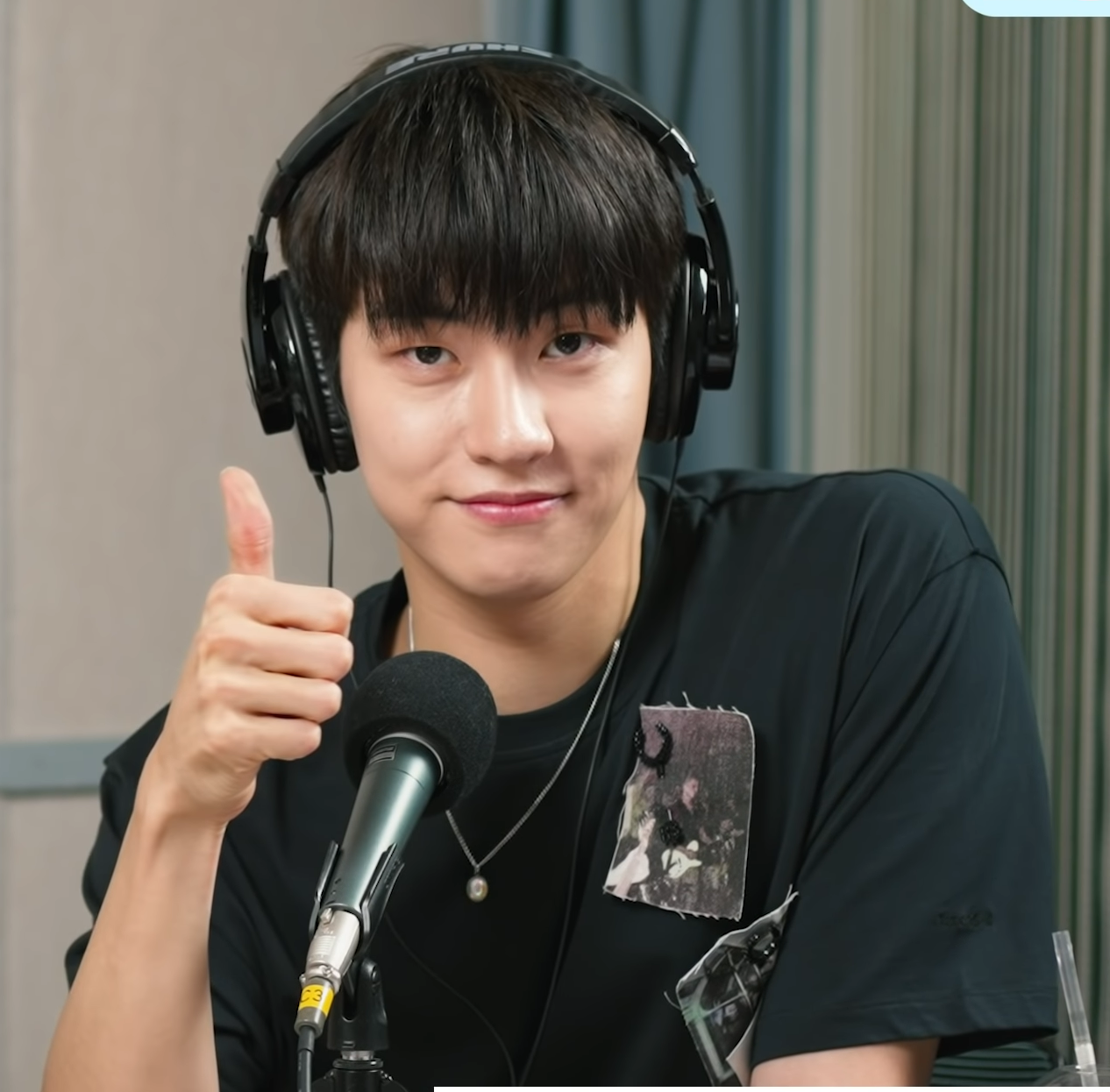
Lee in 2021

On February 22, 2021, Lee made his solo debut with his debut single album On The Track and its lead single "Clicker", under the stage name J.Don (제이던).

In October 2021, Lee announced to star in the drama Shooting Star. He played the role of a rookie actor named Kang Si-deok.

In April 2022, Lee made his first solo appearance in original soundtrack. The track, entitled "Red Light", was the soundtrack for South Korean drama Tomorrow. Lee also wrote the lyrics for the said track.

In April 2024, Lee starred in the tvN drama Lovely Runner. He played the character Bae In-hyeok, who is the leader and guitarist of the band Eclipse. Lee and N.Flying member Yoo Hwe-seung also released a song titled "Star" for the soundtrack of the drama.

In August 2024, he starred in the tvN romance comedy drama Love Next Door, and played the character Bae Dong-jin, the younger brother of Bae Seok-ryu and an aspiring health trainer.

== Personal life ==
=== Military service ===
In June 2020, Lee revealed that he had been exempted from mandatory military enlistment following a medical re-examination. He had undergone two operations after sustaining a leg injury in 2014 while preparing for N.Flying's Korean debut.

== Discography ==
=== Single albums ===
Title	Details
On The Track	Released: February 22, 2021; Label: FNC Entertainment; Formats: CD, digital download; Track listing: 1. "Clicker"; 2. "Moon & Cheese"; 3. "Superstar (Feat. CHEEZE)"

=== Singles ===
Title	Year	Album	Ref.
"God" (with Jimin)	2015	N PROJECT #1 GOD	
"So Nice (GMF2020 Ver.)" (with Grand Mint Band)	2020	So Nice (GMF2020 Ver.)	

=== Soundtrack appearances ===
Title	Year	Album	Ref.
"Red Light"	2022	Tomorrow OST Part 1	
"My Heart Says"	2025	Spring of Youth OST Part 4	
"See You Later"	2025	Spring of Youth OST Part 8	
"See You Later"	2025	Spring of Youth OST Part 10	
"Last Spring"	2025	Surely Tomorrow Vol.1	

=== Other appearances ===
List of non-single guest appearances, showing year released and album name
Title	Year	Album
"Bonfire" (with Lee Hong-gi)	2020	Live-2018 Solo Concert -Cheers-
"Come To Me" (with Lee Hong-gi)	2020	Live-2018 Solo Concert -Cheers-
"Cookies" (with Lee Hong-gi)	2020	Live-2018 Solo Concert -Cheers-
"Start Over" (with NA:H, Hwiyoung)	2024	lost fantasy
"Dangerously (Prod. Czaer)" (with Yoo Hwe-seung)	2024	Stage Fighter(STF) Original Vol.4

== Filmography ==
=== Television series ===
Year	Title	Role	Note	Ref.
2016	Entertainer	Special MC of The show program	Cameo (Ep.18)	
2017	Save Me	Student		
2019	Best Chicken	Park Joon-hyuk		
2021	Must You Go?	Lee Won		
2021	Nevertheless	Joo Hyuk		
2022	Shooting Stars	Kang Si-deok		
2024	Lovely Runner	Baek In-hyuk		
2024	Love Next Door	Bae Dong-jin		
2025	Spring of Youth	Seo Tae-yang		

=== Web series ===
Year	Title	Role	Ref.
2017	All the Love in the World: Season 3	Dr. Lee Seung-hyub	
2018	Luv Pub	Terry/Kang Bong-nam	
2019	All Boys High	Song Bong	
2020	Big Picture House	Kwon Hyun-min	

=== Television show ===
Year	Title	Role	Notes	Ref.
2019	King of Mask Singer	Contestant	as "Red Bean Bread" (episode 199)	

=== Endorsements ===
Year	Títle	Note
2015	Buckaroo Jeans	with Seolhyun

== Awards and nominations ==
Name of the award ceremony, year presented, category, nominee of the award, and the result of the nomination
Award ceremony	Year	Category	Nominee / Work	Result	Ref.
APAN Star Awards	2024	Best New Actor	Lovely Runner	Nominated	
Brand of the Year Awards	2024	Actor – Idol	Lee Seung-hyub (Lovely Runner)	Won	
