= Queendom (TV series) =

South Korean reality competition series

- Promotional poster
- Hangul: 퀸덤
- RR: Kwindeom
- MR: K'windŏm
- Genre: Reality competition
- Presented by: [Season 1]; Lee Da-hee; Jang Sung-kyu; [Season 2]; Taeyeon; Lee Yong-jin
- Starring: [Season 1]; Park Bom; AOA; Mamamoo; Lovelyz; Oh My Girl; (G)I-dle; [Season 2]; Hyolyn; Viviz; Brave Girls (BB Girls); WJSN; Loona; Kep1er
- Country of origin: South Korea
- Original language: Korean
- No. of seasons: 2
- No. of episodes: 10 (Season 1); 10 (Season 2)

Production
- Running time: 90 minutes; (150 minutes for episode 10)
- Production companies: CJ ENM; The M (season 1); W Team (season 2)

Original release
- Network: Mnet
- Release: August 29, 2019 – June 2, 2022

Related
- Road to Kingdom (2020); Kingdom: Legendary War (2021); Queendom Puzzle (2023); Road to Kingdom: Ace of Ace (2024)

Queendom (Korean: 퀸덤) is a South Korean reality competition series created by Mnet.

The first season aired from August 29 to October 31, 2019, every Thursday at 21:20 (KST). For the season, Mamamoo finished in first place.

The second season, dubbed as Queendom 2, aired March 31 to June 2, 2022, every Thursday at 21:20 (KST). For the season, WJSN finished in first place.

== Overview ==
The program is a comeback battle between 6 trending girl group acts, in order to "determine the real number one" when all 6 release their singles at the same time. The winning act will have a comeback show only for them, showing the new song and their other hit songs, arranged however they want it. The comeback show is broadcast on Mnet and M2.

The first and second seasons lasted for 11 weeks, both featuring 3 preliminary performances and 1 live comeback stage from each act. The Comeback Singles, which are newly produced songs of the six acts, are released a few days prior to the final episode. The digital points accumulated for the Comeback Singles and live votes for the comeback stages on the final episode, together with the accumulated points from the 3 preliminary rounds, were combined to determine the final winner.

The first season's winner was Mamamoo; their comeback show happened on November 3, 2020 as the group made their comeback with their tenth mini album Travel. The comeback show for the second season's winner WJSN took place on July 5, 2022 with their first special single album Sequence.

== Cast ==
Season 1 (2019)

Hosts

- Lee Da-hee – "Queen" MC
- Jang Sung-kyu – "Dom" MC

Contestants

- Park Bom
- AOA
- Mamamoo
- Lovelyz
- Oh My Girl
- (G)I-dle
Season 2 (2022)

Hosts

- Taeyeon – "Grandmaster" MC
- Lee Yong-jin – "Queen" Manager

Contestants

- Hyolyn
- Viviz
- Brave Girls
- WJSN (Note: Cheng Xiao, Mei Qi and Xuan Yi didn't participate in the entire show due to focus on China activities. Bona didn't participate in the 1st and 2nd rounds due to scheduling conflict with Twenty-Five Twenty-One. Dawon didn't participate in the entire show due to health issues.)
- Loona
- Kep1er

== Episodes ==
Season 1 (2019)

For the first season, the overall rankings are calculated out of a maximum of 100,000 points for each act, and distributed based on:

- 3 preliminary performances (35,000 points)
  - 1st preliminary performance – 10,000 points
  - 2nd preliminary performance – 10,000 points
  - 3rd preliminary performance – 15,000 points
- Digital points of the Comeback Singles performance (15,000 points)
  - Calculated from the time of release till 23:59 (KST) on October 28, 2019.
- Text message votes of the Finale Live Comeback Stages – 50,000 points

For the preliminary performances, if one act gets a 6th place twice in a row, they will be eliminated from the show. This is also named the "Dishonored Step Down" (불명예 하차).

=== 1st Preliminary Performances – Representative Hit Song Battle (Episode 1–2) ===
In the first preliminary performances, the six teams each perform one of their hit songs that is rearranged and different from their usual stages of the song. Before the performance, the six teams have ten minutes to arrange their cue sheet, which they must complete within the timing, otherwise, they will be deducted 1,000 points. (Note: (G)I–DLE was not present at the time of recording due to an overseas schedule, hence their order will have to depend on the other five teams.) They are also allowed to forcefully rearrange the orders.

For the first preliminary performances, the points are calculated out of a maximum of 10,000 points for each contestant, and distributed based on:

1. Self-Assessment – 1,000 points
2. Special Judges (Note: For the first round, the Special Judges consisted of idol trainees.) – 2,000 points
3. On-Site Audience – 7,000 points

For the Self-Assessment, each contestant has to vote for a team that they believe to have performed better than them (Up vote) and a team that they believe to have performed worse than them (Down vote). If a team believes that none of the other contestants performed better than them, then they may choose not to give an Up vote.

The Audience Judge Squad and the Special Judge Squad (which will consist of idol trainees for Round 1) are to vote for their top two teams after watching all six performances. The team that receives the most votes for the Special Judge Award will have all 2,000 points secured to themselves (Monopoly Rule). Meanwhile, the team that receives the highest number of votes from the on-site audience will receive 7,000 points, and the remaining teams shall receive the number of points in proportion to their number of votes from the Top 1 team.

Round 1 (Representative Hit Song Battle): Score Summary
#	Team	Song	Score Breakdown					Total Score (10,000)	Rank
#	Team	Song	Self-Assessment (1,000)			Special Judges (2,000)	On-Site Audience Vote (7,000)	Total Score (10,000)	Rank
#	Team	Song	Up	Down	Score	Special Judges (2,000)	On-Site Audience Vote (7,000)	Total Score (10,000)	Rank
1	Mamamoo	"Décalcomanie" (데칼코마니)	▲0	▼0	715	0	6,468	7,183	2nd
2	Park Bom	"You and I"	▲0	▼2	429	0	3,808	4,237	5th
3	Oh My Girl	"Secret Garden" (비밀정원)	▲0	▼3	286	0	6,100	6,386	3rd
4	(G)I-dle	"Latata"	▲1	▼0	858	2,000	7,000	9,858	1st
5	Lovelyz	"Ah-Choo"	▲0	▼1	572	0	3,071	3,643	6th
6	AOA	"Miniskirt" (짧은 치마)	▲2	▼0	1,000	0	3,726	4,726	4th

=== 2nd Preliminary Round: Cover Song Battle (Episode 3–4) ===
In the second preliminary performances, the six acts each performs a song from a fellow Queendom act, that is rearranged into a different style. Before the performance, the act that ranked first in the first preliminary performances get the priority to choose an act of their choice and cover of one of their songs in this round, the chosen act will also cover one of the songs from the chooser act. The same process is applied to the acts ranked second to sixth in the first preliminary performances, with the remaining two acts regardless of ranking that are not chosen becoming a pair to cover each other's songs. The act that ranked first in the first preliminary performances also get to arrange their cue sheet for this round. Each act must also perform a Queendom Quest, which are picked randomly, act that successfully completed the Queendom Quest, get one of the following benefits that are picked randomly:

- Watch other acts rehearsal for a day (contestants are usually not allowed to watch the other acts rehearse)
- Free Pass for Special Effects
- Exchange Pass for one-time cue sheet position
- Free Pass for 2nd Preliminary Performances song selection
- Production Crew Chance

For the second preliminary round, the same points breakdown from the first round shall apply, wherein a maximum of 10,000 points can be earned, and the points are distributed based on:

1. Self-Assessment – 1,000 points
2. Special Judges (Note: For the second round, the Special Judges consisted of security guards.) – 2,000 points
3. On-site Audience – 7,000 points

For the Self-Assessment, each contestant has to vote for a team that they believe to have performed better than them (Up vote) and a team that they believe to have performed worse than them (Down vote). If a team believes that none of the other contestants performed better than them, then they may choose not to give an Up vote.

The Audience Judge Squad and the Special Judge Squad (which will consist of security guards for Round 2) are to vote for their top two teams after watching all six performances. The team that receives the most votes for the Special Judge Award will have all 2,000 points secured to themselves (Monopoly Rule). Meanwhile, the team that receives the highest number of votes from the on-site audience will receive 7,000 points, and the remaining teams shall receive the number of points in proportion to their number of votes from the Top 1 team.

Round 2 (Cover Song Battle): Score Summary
#	Team	Song	Score Breakdown					Total Score (10,000)	Rank
#	Team	Song	Self-Assessment (1,000)			Special Judges (2,000)	On-Site Audience Vote (7,000)	Total Score (10,000)	Rank
#	Team	Song	Up	Down	Score	Special Judges (2,000)	On-Site Audience Vote (7,000)	Total Score (10,000)	Rank
1	Mamamoo	"Good Luck" (by AOA)	▲1	▼0	667	0	7,000	7,667	2nd
2	AOA	"Egotistic" (너나 해) (by Mamamoo)	▲1	▼1	556	0	6,368	6,924	3rd
3	Park Bom (Note: Featuring Cheetah)	"Hann (Alone) (한 (ㅡ))" (by (G)I-dle)	▲0	▼0	556	0	4,381	4,937	5th
4	Oh My Girl	"Destiny" (나의 지구) (by Lovelyz)	▲4	▼0	1,000	2,000	6,955	9,955	1st
5	(G)I-dle	"Fire" (by 2NE1)	▲0	▼3	223	0	4,246	4,469	6th
6	Lovelyz	"Sixth Sense" (by Brown Eyed Girls) (Note: Through Queendom Quest, Lovelyz won the benefit of Song Selection Free Pass for the 2nd Preliminary Round, and therefore selected a song that is not by Oh My Girl.)	▲0	▼2	334	0	4,652	4,986	4th

=== 3rd Preliminary Performances (Part 1) – Unit Round (Episode 7) ===
In part one of the third preliminary performances, the six acts each send a main vocalist and main dancer, to form a Vocal Unit and a Performance Unit. The vocal units will compete to gain points as a unit, while the performance unit will perform together but will compete for their respective groups' points. Before the performance, besides each act sending a main vocalist and a main dancer to the Queendom Workshop to practise for this round, the rest of the contestants would join the Queendom Workshop as supporters. (Note: AOA's Seolhyun is absent due to schedule conflicts, and Oh My Girl's Jiho and Mamamoo's Wheein are absent due to health issues.) During the Queendom Workshop, each of the Vocal Units would undergo intermediate check, there after all of the contestants will each vote a Vocal Unit they think would be ranked first in the actual performance. In addition, during the Queendom Workshop, a Queendom Quest between the six acts will be played, with the winning act of the Queendom Quest getting to choose the Special Judge Squad for part two of the third preliminary performances.

For part one of the third preliminary performances, the points breakdown are calculated out of maximum of 5,000 points for each act, and distributed based on:

- Vocal Unit
  - 1st place – 2,500 points given to the unit's members' respective groups
  - 2nd place – 1,500 points given to the unit's members' respective groups
  - 3rd place – 500 points given to the unit's members' respective groups
- Performance Unit
  - 1st place (member with the most votes) – 2,500 points given to her group
  - Remaining members – Points calculated in proportion to the 1st place

The votes breakdown are calculated by the Audience Judge Squad who will each vote for their favorite Vocal Unit and favorite member of the Performance Unit.

==== Vocal Unit ====
Round 3 Pt. 1 (Unit Round - Vocal Unit): Score Summary
#	Unit		Song	Points Breakdown		Ranking
#	Name	Members	Song	Votes	Points	Ranking
1	Bom & Jjung (봄&쩡)	Park Bom; Hyojung (Oh My Girl)	"Scarecrow" (허수아비) by Lee Hi	124	1,500	2nd
2	Ah Ah (아아)	Hyejeong (AOA); Minnie ((G)I-dle)	"Instagram" by Dean	104	500	3rd
3	95 (구오)	Hwasa (Mamamoo); Kei (Lovelyz)	"Wish You Were Gay" (Note: To confuse the other vocal units, they performed Señorita (Shawn Mendes and Camila Cabello) in the intermediate check.) by Billie Eilish	260	2,500	1st

==== Performance Unit ====
Round 3 Pt. 1 (Unit Round - Performance Unit): Score Summary
#	Unit		Performance Songs		Points Breakdown		Ranking
#	Name	Members	Solo Performance	Group Performance	Votes	Points	Ranking
1	6puzzle (식스 퍼즐)	Yein (Lovelyz)	"Sympathy for Lady Vengeance" (Lady Vengeance OST)	"Power" by Little Mix	101	2,296	4th
2	6puzzle (식스 퍼즐)	Soojin ((G)I-dle)	"Señorita" by Shawn Mendes and Camila Cabello	"Power" by Little Mix	104	2,364	3rd
3	6puzzle (식스 퍼즐)	Chanmi (AOA)	"Strip" by Little Mix	"Power" by Little Mix	47	1,068	5th
4	6puzzle (식스 퍼즐)	YooA (Oh My Girl)	"Smooth Criminal" by Michael Jackson	"Power" by Little Mix	110	2,500	1st
5	6puzzle (식스 퍼즐)	Moonbyul (Mamamoo)	"Mirror" by Moonbyul	"Power" by Little Mix	108	2,455	2nd
6	6puzzle (식스 퍼즐)	Eunji (Brave Girls) for Park Bom (Note: By winning the "Staff Chance" through Queendom Quest, Park Bom used the chance to have a substitute for the Performance Unit.)	—	"Power" by Little Mix	19	432	6th

==== Unit Round Results ====
Round 3 Pt. 1 (Unit Round): Overall Score & Ranking Summary
Rank	Contestant	Vocal Unit	Performance Unit	Total points
1st	Mamamoo	2,500	2,455	4,955
2nd	Lovelyz	2,500	2,296	4,796
3rd	Oh My Girl	1,500	2,500	4,000
4th	(G)I-dle	500	2,364	2,864
5th	Park Bom	1,500	432	1,932
6th	AOA	500	1,068	1,568

=== 3rd Preliminary Performances (Part 2) – Fan-dora's Box (Episode 8–9) ===
In part two of the third preliminary performances, the six teams will each perform a song suggested by the audience. For the second part of the third preliminary round, the points are calculated out of a maximum of 10,000 points for each contestant, and distributed based on:

1. Assessment from the other Queendom acts – 1,000 points
2. Special Judge Squad (consisting of housewives from singing club) – 2,000 points
3. Audience Judge Squad – 7,000 points

with the Audience Judge Squad and the Special Judge Squad allowed to vote for two acts. The act that receives the most votes for the Special Judge Award will have all 2,000 points secured to themselves. For the assessment from the other Queendom acts, every act has to vote for an act that they believed to have performed better than them and also to have performed worse than them. A hidden rule is that an act also can choose not to vote for an act that is better than them.

Round 3 Pt. 2 (Fan-dora's Box): Score Summary
#	Team	Song(s)	Points Breakdown					Total Score (10,000)	Rank
#	Team	Song(s)	Self-Assessment (1,000)			Special Judges (2,000)	On-Site Audience (7,000)	Total Score (10,000)	Rank
#	Team	Song(s)	Up Votes	Down Votes	Score	Special Judges (2,000)	On-Site Audience (7,000)	Total Score (10,000)	Rank
1	(G)I-dle	"Put It Straight" (싫다고 말해)	▲2	▼1	858	0	4,562	5,420	4th
2	Mamamoo	"I Miss You"	▲2	▼0	1,000	0	4,657	5,657	3rd
3	AOA (Note: Seolhyun was not able to perform with the group due to schedule conflicts.)	"I'm Jelly Baby" (Note: Performance by Yuna, Hyejeong, and Chanmi)	▲0	▼2	429	0	3,580	4,009	6th
3	AOA	"T4SA + Puss" (Note: Solo performance by Jimin featuring Lee Seung-hyub of N.Flying)	▲0	▼2	429	0	3,580	4,009	6th
4	Oh My Girl	"Twilight"	▲0	▼1	572	0	7,000	7,572	1st
5	Lovelyz	"Cameo"	▲1	▼2	572	2,000	3,136	5,708	2nd
6	Park Bom (Note: featuring modern dancer Han Sun-chun)	"Eyes, Nose, Lips" (눈, 코, 입) (Note: Originally by Taeyang (Big Bang))	▲1	▼0	858	0	4,308	5,166	5th

==== Round 3 Results ====
Round 3 Overall Score Summary
Rank	Team	Part 1 (Unit Round) (5,000)	Part 2 (Fan-dora's Box) (10,000)	Total Score (15,000)
1st	Oh My Girl	4,000	7,572	11,572
2nd	Mamamoo	4,955	5,657	10,612
3rd	Lovelyz	4,796	5,708	10,504
4th	(G)I-dle	2,864	5,420	8,284
5th	Park Bom	1,932	5,166	7,098
6th	AOA	1,568	4,009	5,577

=== Finale Live Comeback Stages (Episode 10) ===
In the finale live comeback stages, the six acts each perform a newly produced song live. Before the performance, the act that ranked first in the third preliminary round gets to arrange their cue sheet for the finale.

For the finale performances, the points are calculated out of a maximum of 50,000 points for each act, and distributed based on votes from the general public through text message, there are not any live audience voting. The team with the most votes gets 50,000 points, with the points for the remaining acts calculated in proportion of the number of votes received to the number of votes received by the 1st placed act.

Finale Comeback Songs: Digital Ranking
#	Team	Song	Digital Ranking
1	AOA	"Sorry"	4th
2	Lovelyz	"Moonlight"	5th
3	Park Bom	"Wanna Go Back" (되돌릴 수 없는 돌아갈 수 없는 돌아갈 곳 없는)	6th
4	Oh My Girl	"Guerilla" (게릴라)	2nd
5	(G)I-dle	"Lion"	3rd
6	Mamamoo	"Destiny" (우린 결국 다시 만날 운명이었지)	1st

=== Points Summary ===
- There were no points breakdown announced for Finale Live Comeback Stage.
- The points for the preliminary performances have been adjusted such that the 1st place act for each preliminary round gets the full points, and the points of the remaining acts would be calculated in proportion to the score of the 1st place act of each round.

Queendom 1: Preliminary Performances - Score Summary
Rank	Artist	Score Breakdown			Total (35,000)
Rank	Artist	Round 1 (10,000)	Round 2 (10,000)	Round 3 (15,000)	Total (35,000)
1st	Oh My Girl	6,478	10,000	15,000	31,478
2nd	Mamamoo	7,287	7,702	13,756	28,745
3rd	(G)I-dle	10,000	4,490	10,738	25,228
4th	Lovelyz	3,696	5,009	13,616	22,321
5th	AOA	4,795	6,956	7,231	18,982
6th	Park Bom	4,299	4,960	9,201	18,460

Queendom 1: Final Score Summary
Rank	Artist	Points			
Rank	Artist	Preliminary Performances (35,000)	Comeback Single Digital Points (15,000)	Finale Live Comeback Stage (50,000)	Total (100,000)
1st	Mamamoo	28,745	1st (15,000)	Unknown	
2nd	Oh My Girl	31,478	2nd	Unknown	
3rd	(G)I-dle	25,228	3rd	Unknown	
4th	Lovelyz	22,321	4th	Unknown	
5th	AOA	18,982	5th	Unknown	
6th	Park Bom	18,460	6th	Unknown	

Season 2 (2022)

For the second season, the overall rankings are calculated based on:

- 3 preliminary performance rounds
  - 1st preliminary performance round – 10,000 points
  - 2nd preliminary performance round – 10,000 points
  - 3rd preliminary performance round – 20,000 points
- Cumulative views and like counts of performance videos (full-version videos only; data of the first 4 days from upload would be counted) (Note: For each video, the view count and the number of likes times 100 are combined.) – 5,000 points
- Fan's Choice votes – 5,000 points
- Digital points of the Comeback Singles calculated from the time of release until 23:59 KST on May 30, 2022 – 20,000 points
- Text message votes of the Finale Live Comeback Stages – 30,000 points

During the preliminary performances, if an act ranks 6th place twice in a row, they will be eliminated from the show (즉시 하차).

=== 1st Preliminary Round: Representative Hit Song Battle (Episodes 1–2) ===
In the first preliminary round, the six teams will each perform one of their songs. They may choose how many songs to perform, and are also allowed to perform songs from their previous acts.

For the first preliminary performances, the points breakdown is calculated out of a maximum of 10,000 points for each act, and distributed based on:

1. Self-Assessment – 1,000 points
2. Global Audience Vote – 3,000 points
3. Live Audience Votes (including rookie idol groups MCND, Woo!ah!, Drippin, Purple Kiss, and Luminous) – 6,000 points

For the Self-Assessment, every contestant has to vote for a team that they believe to have performed better than them (Up vote) and also to have performed worse than them (Down vote). A team may choose not to cast an Up vote if they believe that no team performed better than them. The Global Audience and Live Audience shall vote for their top two teams after watching all six performances. For each category, the 1st placed team gets the maximum number of points, while the remaining teams get the points based on the proportions of the votes obtained to the points obtained of the 1st placed team.

#	Team	Song(s)	Score Breakdown					Total Score (10,000)	Rank
#	Team	Song(s)	Self-Assessment (1,000)			Global Audience (3,000)	On-Site Audience (6,000)	Total Score (10,000)	Rank
#	Team	Song(s)	Up	Down	Score	Global Audience (3,000)	On-Site Audience (6,000)	Total Score (10,000)	Rank
1	Viviz	"Time for the Moon Night" (밤) + "Rough" (시간을 달려서) (Note: Under the title "Time for the Glory" in English.)	▲0	▼3	334	2,192	3,311	5,837	3rd
2	Hyolyn	"Touch My Body"	▲1	▼0	1,000	3,000	6,000	10,000	1st
3	Kep1er	"Wa Da Da" (Queendom 2 ver.)	▲0	▼1	667	1,861	2,173	4,701	4th
4	Brave Girls	"Chi Mat Ba Ram" (치맛바람) + "Rollin'" (롤린) (Remix)	▲0	▼0	834	1,247	2,035	4,116	5th
5	WJSN	"As You Wish" (이루리)	▲0	▼1	667	2,611	3,863	7,141	2nd
—N/a	Loona (Note: Originally meant to perform 5th in order, Loona did not participate in the first round after three members tested positive for COVID-19 prior to the recording of the first round held on February 28; the group was hence automatically placed 6th. Loona performed at a later date prior to the second round.)	"PTT (Paint the Town)"	—N/a						6th

=== 2nd Preliminary Round: Cover Song Battle (Episode 3–4) ===
In the second preliminary performances, the six acts each performs a song from a fellow Queendom act that is rearranged into a different style.

For the second preliminary performances, the points breakdown is calculated out of a maximum of 10,000 points for each act, and distributed based on:

1. Self-Assessment – 1,000 points
2. Global audience votes – 3,000 points
3. Live audience votes (including groups AOA, (G)I-dle, The Boyz, Pentagon, Oneus, and TO1) – 6,000 points

For the Self-Assessment, every act has to vote for an act that they believed to have performed better than them and also to have performed worse than them. A hidden rule is that an act also can choose not to vote (usually) for an act that is better than them. The 1st placed act gets the full 10,000 points, with each of the remaining acts getting points based on the proportions of the points obtained compared to the points obtained for the 1st placed act.

#	Team	Song	Score Breakdown					Total Score	Ranking
#	Team	Song	Self-Assessment			Global Audience	On-Site Audience	Total Score	Ranking
#	Team	Song	Up	Down	Score	Global Audience	On-Site Audience	Total Score	Ranking
1	WJSN	"Navillera" (너 그리고 나) by GFriend	▲0	▼2	500	1,960	2,937	5,397	3rd
2	Loona	"Shake It" by Sistar	▲0	▼1	667	2,449	3,316	6,432	2nd
3	Brave Girls	"MVSK" (Note: Inspired from the American heist film "Now You See Me".) by Kep1er	▲0	▼2	500	850	1,611	2,961	6th
4	Viviz	"Unnatural" by WJSN	▲0	▼0	834	1,830	1,769	4,433	4th
5	Kep1er	"Pool Party (Rollin' Right Now)" (Note: A mash-up of Brave Girls's "Pool Party" and "Rollin'".) by Brave Girls	▲0	▼1	667	1,500	1,864	4,031	5th
6	Hyolyn	"So What" (Note: Included a small snippet of Loona's "PTT (Paint The Town)") by Loona	▲1	▼0	1,000	3,000	6,000	10,000	1st

=== 3rd Preliminary Performances (Part 1) – Position Unit Battle (Episode 6–7) ===
In part one of the third preliminary performances, the six acts are split into Vocal and Dance Units; each of the units work together to create a performance specific to the unit's type.

The maximum points an act can obtain is 5,000 points; 2,500 points maximum vocal and dance units each which are distributed based on:

- 1st place – 2,500 points given to the unit's members' respective groups
- 2nd place – 1,500 points given to the unit's members' respective groups
- 3rd place – 500 points given to the unit's members' respective groups

==== Vocal Units ====
#	Unit			Song	Breakdown		Ranking
#	Name	Group	Members	Song	Votes	Points	Ranking
1	Sun and Moon (해와 달)	Loona	HaSeul, Kim Lip, JinSoul, Chuu	"Don't Go" (나비소녀) (by EXO)	85	500	3rd
1	Sun and Moon (해와 달)	Kep1er	Kim Chaehyun, Seo Youngeun	"Don't Go" (나비소녀) (by EXO)	85	500	3rd
2	Milky Way that Embraces the Universe (우주를 품은 은하)	Viviz	Eunha	"Hold My Hand" (내 손을 잡아) (Note: During the interim check, they performed "Across the Universe" by Baek Ye-rin.) (by IU)	121	2,500	1st
2	Milky Way that Embraces the Universe (우주를 품은 은하)	WJSN	Soobin, Yeonjung	"Hold My Hand" (내 손을 잡아) (by IU)	121	2,500	1st
3	33	Hyolyn		"To My Youth" (나의 사춘기에게) (by BOL4)	90	1,500	2nd
3	33	Brave Girls	Minyoung	"To My Youth" (나의 사춘기에게) (by BOL4)	90	1,500	2nd

==== Dance Units ====
#	Unit			Song	Breakdown		Ranking
#	Name	Group	Members	Song	Votes	Points	Ranking
1	KeV1Z (케비지)	Viviz	SinB, Umji	"Purr" (Note: Choreographed by HolyBang's Honey J & Hertz)	77	500	3rd
1	KeV1Z (케비지)	Kep1er	Xiaoting, Kim; Dayeon, Hikaru	"Purr"	77	500	3rd
2	Ex-it	Hyolyn		"KA-BOOM!" (Note: Choreographed by Lachica's Gabee, Rian, Simeez)	96	1,500	2nd
2	Ex-it	WJSN	Eunseo, Yeoreum	"KA-BOOM!"	96	1,500	2nd
3	Queen is Me (퀸이 나)	Brave Girls	Eunji	"Tell Me Now" (탐이 나) (Note: Choreographed by Prowdmon's Monika)	112	2,500	1st
3	Queen is Me (퀸이 나)	Loona	HeeJin, Choerry, Yves, Olivia Hye	"Tell Me Now" (탐이 나)	112	2,500	1st

==== Results ====
Rank	Team	Vocal Unit	Dance Unit	Total Points
1st	WJSN	2,500	1,500	4,000
1st	Brave Girls	1,500	2,500	4,000
3rd	Loona	500	2,500	3,000
3rd	Viviz	2,500	500	3,000
3rd	Hyolyn	1,500	1,500	3,000
6th	Kep1er	500	500	1,000

=== 3rd Preliminary Round (Part 2) – FANtastic Queendom (Episodes 8–9) ===
In Part 2 of the third preliminary round, the six acts will each perform a song suggested by their fans.

The maximum amount of points a team can obtain is 15,000 points, which are distributed based on:

1. Self-Assessment – 1,000 points
2. Global audience votes – 5,000 points
3. Live audience votes – 9,000 points

For the Self-Assessment, every act has to vote for an act that they believed to have performed better than them and also to have performed worse than them. A hidden rule is that an act also can choose not to vote for an act that is better than them. The 1st placed act gets the full 15,000 points, with each of the remaining acts getting points based on the proportions of the points obtained compared to the points obtained for the 1st placed act.

#	Team	Song	Score Breakdown					Total Score	Ranking
#	Team	Song	Self-Assessment			Global Audience	On-Site Audience	Total Score	Ranking
#	Team	Song	Up	Down	Score	Global Audience	On-Site Audience	Total Score	Ranking
1	Kep1er	"The Boys" (Queendom 2 ver.) (Note: Originally by Girls' Generation)	▲0	▼1	572	3,025	4,734	8,331	5th
2	Viviz	"Bop Bop!"	▲0	▼2	429	3,113	2,981	6,523	6th
3	WJSN	"Pantomime"	▲0	▼0	715	4,780	8,767	14,262	2nd
4	Loona	"Butterfly"	▲0	▼3	286	3,367	5,319	8,972	3rd
5	Brave Girls	"Red Sun" (Note: Included a sample from "Canon in D Major" by Johann Pachelbel.)	▲2	▼0	1,000	5,000	9,000	15,000	1st
6	Hyolyn (Note: Featuring Park Hye-rim (aka Harimu).)	"See Sea, BAE" (Note: Not to be confused as a mash-up of Hyolyn's "See Sea" and "BAE", the performance contains only the song "See Sea", with the "BAE" inserted on the title as Hyolyn's fandom name.) (바다보러갈래 BAE)	▲1	▼0	858	1,932	6,020	8,810	4th

==== Results ====
Rank	Team	Points breakdown		
Rank	Team	Part 1 (Unit Round)	Part 2 (FANtastic Queendom)	Round 3 Total
1st	Brave Girls	4,000	15,000	19,000
2nd	WJSN	4,000	14,262	18,262
3rd	Loona	3,000	8,972	11,972
4th	Hyolyn	3,000	8,810	11,810
5th	Viviz	3,000	6,523	9,523
6th	Kep1er	1,000	8,331	9,331

=== Finale Live Comeback Stages (Episode 10) ===
In the finale live comeback stages, the six acts each perform a newly produced song live. The maximum points an act can obtain is 20,000 points.

#	Team	Song	Ranking (Digital)	Digital Points
1	Hyolyn	"Waka Boom (My Way)" (feat. Lee Young-ji)	6th	8,459
2	WJSN	"Aura"	2nd	19,736
3	Kep1er	"The Girls (Can't Turn Me Down)"	4th	14,450
4	Viviz	"Red Sun!" (환상)	3rd	15,419
5	Loona	"Pose"	1st	20,000
6	Brave Girls	"Whistle"	5th	10,045
Special Performance
7	Hyolyn; Eunha (Viviz); Yuna (Brave Girls); Seola (WJSN); HeeJin (Loona); Kang Yeseo (Kep1er)	"Epilogue" (지나온)	—N/a	

=== Points Summary ===
Queendom 2: Preliminary Performances - Total Score Summary
Rank	Artist	Score Breakdown			Total Score (40,000)
Rank	Artist	Round 1 (10,000)	Round 2 (10,000)	Round 3 (20,000)	Total Score (40,000)
1st	Hyolyn	10,000	10,000	11,810	31,810
2nd	WJSN	7,141	5,397	18,262	30,800
3rd	Brave Girls	4,116	2,961	19,000	26,077
4th	Viviz	5,837	4,433	9,523	19,793
5th	Loona	0	6,432	11,972	18,404
6th	Kep1er	4,701	4,031	9,331	18,063

Queendom 2: Overall Score Breakdown
Rank	Artist	Score Breakdown					Total (100,000 points)
Rank	Artist	Preliminary Performances (40,000)	Full Ver. Performance Videos (5,000)	Fan's Choice Votes (5,000)	Comeback Single (20,000)	Finale Live Comeback Stage (30,000)	Total (100,000 points)
1st	WJSN	30,800	6,623		19,736	23,861	81,020
2nd	Loona	18,404	9,584		20,000	30,000	77,988
3rd	Viviz	19,793	8,650		15,419	10,557	54,419
4th	Hyolyn	31,810	6,674		8,459	1,818	48,761
5th	Kep1er	18,063	7,474		14,450	6,986	46,973
6th	Brave Girls	26,077	6,516		10,045	3,258	45,896

== Discography ==
Season 1 (2019)

=== Cover Song Performances Part 1 ===
Released on September 13, 2019
No.	Title	Lyrics	Music	Artist	Length
1.	"Good Luck"	Han Sung-ho; Jang Yeon-jung; Innovator; Moonbyul; Hwasa	Matthew Tishler; Aaron Benward; Felicia Barton; (Note: Arranged by Kim Do-hoon and Lee Hoo-sang)	Mamamoo	4:01
2.	"Egotistic" (너나 해)	Kim Do-hoon; Park Woo-sang; Jimin	Kim Do-hoon; Park Woo-sang; (Note: Arranged by Park Soo-seok and Seo Ji-eun)	AOA	3:34
3.	"HANN (Alone)" (한(一))	Soyeon; Cheetah	Soyeon; Yummy Tone; (Note: Arranged by Yummy Tone and GoodVibes)	Park Bom	3:46
Total length:					11:21

=== Cover Song Performances Part 2 ===
Released on September 20, 2019
No.	Title	Lyrics	Music	Artist	Length
1.	"Destiny" (나의 지구)	Jeon Gan-di; Mimi	1Piece; (Note: Arranged by DJ KAESAMA(Lee Choong Joo), Lee Jung-chul)	Oh My Girl	3:50
2.	"Sixth Sense"	Kim Eana; Miryo	Lee Min-soo; (Note: Arranged by BLSSD)	Lovelyz	4:17
Total length:					8:07

=== Fan-dora's Box Part 1 ===
Released on October 18, 2019
No.	Title	Lyrics	Music	Artist	Length
1.	"Put It Straight (Nightmare Version)" (싫다고 말해 (Nightmare Version))	Soyeon	Soyeon; (Note: Arranged by Jun and Soyeon)	(G)I-dle	4:16
2.	"I Miss You"	Kim Do-hoon; Hwang Yoo-bin; Moonbyul	Kim Do-hoon; (Note: Arranged by Kim Do-hoon and Lee Hoo-sang)	Mamamoo	4:23
Total length:					8:39

=== Fan-dora's Box Part 2 ===
Released on October 25, 2019
No.	Title	Lyrics	Music	Artist	Length
1.	"Twilight"	Seo Ji-eum; Mimi	Command Freaks; Onestar (Monotree); Krysta Youngs; (Note: Arranged by DJ KAESAMA and Common Freaks)	Oh My Girl	4:41
2.	"Cameo (Musical Ver.)"	Shim Eun-ji; The Kick Sound	Shim Eun-ji; The Kick Sound; (Note: Arranged by Choi Paeng and VINT)	Lovelyz	4:16
3.	"Eyes, Nose, Lips" (눈, 코, 입)	Teddy; Taeyang	Teddy; DEE.P (FUTURE BOUNCE); Rebecca Johnson; (Note: Arranged by DALGUI)	Park Bom	3:58
Total length:					12:55

=== Finale Comeback Singles ===
Released on October 25, 2019
No.	Title	Lyrics	Music	Artist	Length
1.	"Sorry"	Han Sung-ho; Jimin; Christopher	Sebastian Thott; Didrik Thott; Brooke Williams; (Note: Arranged by Sebastian Thott)	AOA	3:39
2.	"Moonlight"	Fuxxy; Vincenzo; Any Masingga; Anna Timgren	Fuxxy; Vincenzo; Any Masingga; Anna Timgren; (Note: Arranged by Vincenzo and Any Masingga)	Lovelyz	3:26
3.	"Wanna Go Back" (되돌릴 수 없는 돌아갈 수 없는 돌아갈 곳 없는)	Brave Brothers; Chakun	Mozaix; Brave Brothers; Chakun; (Note: Arranged by Mozaix and Alawn)	Park Bom	3:37
4.	"Guerilla" (게릴라)	Seo Ji-eum; Mimi	Steven Lee; Joe Lawrence; Caroline Gustavsson; (Note: Arranged by Steven Lee and Joe Lawrence)	Oh My Girl	3:47
5.	"Lion"	Soyeon	Soyeon; Big Sancho (Yummy Tone); (Note: Arranged by Big Sancho (Yummy Tone) and Soyeon)	(G)I-dle	3:30
6.	"Destiny" (우린 결국 다시 만날 운명이었지)	Kim Do-hoon; Park Woo-sang	Kim Do-hoon; Park Woo-sang; (Note: Arranged by Kim Do-hoon and Park Woo-sang)	Mamamoo	4:07
Total length:					22:06

=== Chart performance ===
Title	Year	Peak positions	Remarks	Ref.
Title	Year	KOR	Remarks	Ref.
"Good Luck" (Mamamoo)	2019	—	Queendom Cover Song Performances Part 1	—N/a
"Egotistic" (너나 해) (AOA)	2019	108	Queendom Cover Song Performances Part 1	
"HANN (Alone)" (한(一)) (Park Bom)	2019	—	Queendom Cover Song Performances Part 1	—N/a
"Destiny" (나의 지구) (Oh My Girl)	2019	70	Queendom Cover Song Performances Part 2	
"Sixth Sense" (Lovelyz)	2019	—	Queendom Cover Song Performances Part 2	—N/a
"Put It Straight (Nightmare Version)" (싫다고 말해) ((G)I-dle)	2019	199	Queendom Fan-dora's Box Part 1	
"I Miss You" (Mamamoo)	2019	—	Queendom Fan-dora's Box Part 1	—N/a
"Twilight" (Oh My Girl)	2019	—	Queendom Fan-dora's Box Part 2	—N/a
"Cameo (Musical Ver.)" (Lovelyz)	2019	—	Queendom Fan-dora's Box Part 2	—N/a
"Eyes, Nose, Lips" (눈, 코, 입) (Park Bom)	2019	—	Queendom Fan-dora's Box Part 2	—N/a
"Sorry" (AOA)	2019	—	Queendom Finale Comeback Singles	—N/a
"Moonlight" (Lovelyz)	2019	—	Queendom Finale Comeback Singles	—N/a
"Wanna Go Back" (되돌릴 수 없는 돌아갈 수 없는 돌아갈 곳 없는) (Park Bom)	2019	—	Queendom Finale Comeback Singles	—N/a
"Guerilla" (게릴라) (Oh My Girl)	2019	87	Queendom Finale Comeback Singles	
"Lion" ((G)I-dle)	2019	19	Queendom Finale Comeback Singles	
"Destiny" (우린 결국 다시 만날 운명이었지) (Mamamoo)	2019	68	Queendom Finale Comeback Singles	
"—" denotes releases that did not chart or were not released in that region.

Season 2 (2022)

=== Part 1-1 ===
Released on April 1, 2022
No.	Title	Lyrics	Music	Artist	Length
1.	"Interlude : Who is the Queen"	bcalm	bcalm	bcalm	2:28
2.	"Time For the Glory" (밤 + 시간을 달려서)	Noh Joo-hwan; Im Soo-ho; Seo Yong-bae	Noh Joo-Hwan; Lee Won-Jong; Lim Su-Ho; Seo Yong-Bae; Factist	Viviz	4:21
3.	"Touch My Body"	Black Eyed Pilseung	Black Eyed Pilseung; Hyolyn; Eastbeam	Hyolyn	3:34
4.	"Epilogue" (지나온; Inst.)		Yoske; Iver (Alive Knob); J2 (Alive Knob); Soong (Alive Knob)		3:32
5.	"Epilogue" (지나온; Piano Version)		Yoske; Iver (Alive Knob); J2 (Alive Knob); Soong (Alive Knob)		5:18
Total length:					19:13

Notes

- "Interlude: Who is the Queen" is stylized in all caps.
- "Time For the Glory" is a combination of GFriend's "Time for the Moon Night" and "Rough".

=== Part 1-2 ===
Released on April 8, 2022
No.	Title	Lyrics	Music	Artist	Length
1.	"Wa Da Da" (Queendom 2 ver.)	BuildingOwner (PrismFilter); Elum (PrismFilter); Hwang Yu-bin; Odal Park; Shannon; Isran; Danke; Kako	BuildingOwner (PrismFilter); Elum (PrismFilter); Shannon	Kep1er	3:54
2.	"Chi Mat Ba Ram" + "Rollin'" (치맛바람 + 롤린; Remix)	Brave Brothers; Chakun	Brave Brothers; Chakun; Red Cookie; Two Champ	Brave Girls	3:47
3.	"As You Wish" (이루리)	KZ; D'DAY; B.O.; Exy	KZ; Nthonius; Nomasgood (PNP); RGBY (PNP)	WJSN	4:11
4.	"PTT (Paint the Town)"	Ryan S. Jhun; Hanif Hitmanic Sabzevari; Dennis DeKo Kordnejad; Youha	Ryan S. Jhun; Hanif Hitmanic Sabzevari; Dennis DeKo Kordnejad; Youha; DJ Kaesama; Indy	Loona	4:14
Total length:					16:06

Notes

- "Wa Da Da" is stylized in all caps.

=== Part 2-1 ===
Released on April 15, 2022
No.	Title	Lyrics	Music	Artist	Length
1.	"Navillera" (나 그러고 나)	Iggy (RBW); Yongbae (RBW); Exy	Iggy (RBW); Yongbae (RBW); KZ; Nthonius; Meisobo; BO	WJSN	4:07
2.	"Shake It"	Double Sidekick; Hottie	Double Sidekick; Hottie; DJ KAESAMA; Indy	Loona	4:14
3.	"MVSK" (Remix)	Jeong Ho-hyeon (E.one)	Jeong Ho-hyeon (E.one); Red Cookie; JS	Brave Girls	3:41
Total length:					12:02

Notes

- All tracks are stylized in all caps.
- All tracks are cover versions with "Navillera" originally sung by GFriend, "Shake It" originally sung by Sistar, and "MVSK" originally sung by Kep1er.

=== Part 2-2 ===
Released on April 22, 2022
No.	Title	Lyrics	Music	Artist	Length
1.	"Unnatural"	KevinOppa (mr.cho); Song Hee-jin; Exy	KevinOppa (mr.cho); Song Hee-jin; Chris Wahle; Factist; 1Mad; Jossh	Viviz	4:04
2.	"Pool Party (Rollin' right now)"	Brave Brothers; Maboos	Brave Brothers; Maboos; JS; MonoTree	Kep1er	4:00
3.	"So What"	Jo Yun-gyeong	David Anthony; Anna Timgren; Hyolyn; Eastbeam	Hyolyn	4:03
Total length:					12:07

Notes

- "Unnatural" is stylized in all caps.
- "Pool Party (Rollin' right now)" is a remix of Brave Girls's "Pool Party" and "Rollin'".
- All tracks are cover versions with "Unnatural" originally sung by WJSN, "Pool Party" originally sung by Brave Girls, and "So What" originally sung by Loona.

=== Position Unit Battle Part 1-1 ===
Released on May 6, 2022
No.	Title	Lyrics	Music	Artist	Length
1.	"Don't Go" (나비소녀; Queendom 2 ver.)	Seo Ji-eum	Hyuk Shin (153/Joombas); DK; Jordan Kyle; John Major; Jeffrey Patrick Lewis; StainBoys; Park Ji-eun	Sun & Moon (Loona & Kep1er)	3:41
Total length:					3:41

Notes

- "Don't Go" is a cover version originally sung by Exo.

=== Position Unit Battle Part 1-2 ===
Released on May 13, 2022
No.	Title	Lyrics	Music	Artist	Length
1.	"Purr"	Andy Love (THG/Sony)	Andy Love; Alysa (153/Joombas)	Kev1z (Viviz & Kep1er)	3:26
2.	"Ka-Boom!"	Znee (153/Joombas)	Anna Timgren; David Amber(153/Joombas)	Ex-it (Hyolyn & WJSN)	2:59
3.	"Tell Me Now" (탐이 나)	GDLO (MonoTree)	Aurora (MonoTree); Kwon Ae-jin (MonoTree)	Queen is Me (Brave Girls & Loona)	2:42
Total length:					9:08

Notes

- "Ka-Boom!" is stylized in all caps.

=== Fantastic Queendom Part 1-1 ===
Released on May 20, 2022
No.	Title	Lyrics	Music	Artist	Length
1.	"Bop Bop!" (Highteen version)	Hwang Yu-bin; Mi Lee-mu (PaperMaker)	Lim Soo-ho (PaperMaker); Woong Kim (PaperMaker); Anna Timgren; PaperMaker	Viviz	4:03
2.	"Pantomime"	Kim Jin-hwan; Exy	Kim Jin-hwan	WJSN	4:08
Total length:					8:11

Notes

- "Bop Bop!" is stylized in all caps.

=== Fantastic Queendom Part 1-2 ===
Released on May 26, 2022
No.	Title	Lyrics	Music	Artist	Length
1.	"Butterfly"	G-High (MonoTree); Jaden Jeong	G-High (MonoTree); DJ Kaesama	Loona	4:15
2.	"Red Sun" (Remix)	Brave Brothers; Chakun	Brave Brothers; Chakun; Red Cookie; Any Masingga; Elluii; J6	Brave Girls	4:15
3.	"See Sea, Bae" (바다보러갈래 Bae)	Black Eyed Pilseung; Jeon Seung-hyun	Blacked Eye Pilseung; Jeon Seung-hyun; Hyolyn; Eastbeam	Hyolyn	3:27
Total length:					11:57

Notes

- "See Sea, Bae" is a combination of Hyolyn's "See Sea" and "Bae".

=== Final ===
Released on May 27, 2022
No.	Title	Lyrics	Music	Artist	Length
1.	"Waka Boom (My Way)" (featuring Lee Young-ji)	Hyolyn; Lee Young-ji; Seo Ji-eum	Hyolyn; Olof Lindskog; Ludwig Lindell; Hayley Aitken; Ollipop	Hyolyn; Lee Young-ji	4:33
2.	"Aura"	Exy; Makecake36	Exy; Makecake36	WJSN	3:35
3.	"The Girls (Can't Turn Me Down)"	Jeong Ha-ri	Alawn; Andy Love	Kep1er	3:58
4.	"Red Sun!" (환상)	Noh Joo-hwan	Noh Joo-hwan	Viviz	4:13
5.	"Pose"	Amelia Moore; Jbach; Landon Sears; MZMC; This Era (MUMW); Y0UNG; Vacation (MUMW)	Amelia Moore; Jbach; Landon Sears; MZMC; Pink Slip; Inverness	Loona	3:06
6.	"Whistle"	Brave Brothers; Chakun	Brave Brothers; Chakun; Red Cookie	Brave Girls	3:43
Total length:					23:08

Notes

- "Aura", "The Girls", and "Pose" are stylized in all caps.

=== Special Song (Epilogue) ===
Released on June 3, 2022
No.	Title	Lyrics	Music	Artist	Length
1.	"Epilogue" (지나온)	Yoske, Alive Knob	Yoske; Iver (Alive Knob); J2 (Alive Knob); Soong (Alive Knob)	Queendom 2	3:32
Total length:					3:32

=== Chart performance ===
Title	Year	Peak chart positions	Album
Title	Year	KOR	Album
"Interlude : Who is the Queen"	2022	—	Queendom 2 Part 1-1
"Time For The Glory" (밤 + 시간을 달려서) (Viviz)	2022	— (Note: "Time For the Glory" did not enter the Gaon Digital Chart, but peaked at number 88 on the component Download chart.)	Queendom 2 Part 1-1
"Touch My Body" (Hyolyn)	2022	—	Queendom 2 Part 1-1
"Epilogue (Instrumental)" (지나온)	2022	—	Queendom 2 Part 1-1
"Epilogue (Piano version)" (지나온)	2022	—	Queendom 2 Part 1-1
"Wa Da Da (Queendom 2 version)" (Kep1er)	2022	—	Queendom 2 Part 1-2
"Chi Mat Ba Ram + Rollin'" (치맛바람 + 롤린) (Brave Girls)	2022	—	Queendom 2 Part 1-2
"As You Wish" (이루리) (WJSN)	2022	— (Note: "As You Wish" did not enter the Gaon Digital Chart, but peaked at number 186 on the component Download chart.)	Queendom 2 Part 1-2
"PTT (Paint the Town)" (Loona)	2022	—	Queendom 2 Part 1-2
"Navillera" (나 그러고 나) (WJSN)	2022	— (Note: "Navillera" did not enter the Gaon Digital Chart, but peaked at number 90 on the component Download chart.)	Queendom 2 Part 2-1
"Shake It" (Loona)	2022	— (Note: "Shake It" did not enter the Gaon Digital Chart, but peaked at number 139 on the component Download chart.)	Queendom 2 Part 2-1
"MVSK (Remix)" (Brave Girls)	2022	— (Note: "MVSK (Remix)" did not enter the Gaon Digital Chart, but peaked at number 78 on the component Download chart.)	Queendom 2 Part 2-1
"Unnatural" (Viviz)	2022	— (Note: "Unnatural" did not enter the Gaon Digital Chart, but peaked at number 104 on the component Download chart.)	Queendom 2 Part 2-2
"Pool Party (Rollin' right now)" (Kep1er)	2022	—	Queendom 2 Part 2-2
"So What" (Hyolyn)	2022	— (Note: "So What" did not enter the Gaon Digital Chart, but peaked at number 142 on the component Download chart.)	Queendom 2 Part 2-2
"Don't Go (Queendom 2 version)" (as Sun & Moon consisting of members from Loona, and Kep1er)	2022	— (Note: "Don't Go (Queendom 2 Version)" did not enter the Gaon Digital Chart, but peaked at number 101 on the component Download chart.)	Queendom 2 Position Unit Battle 1-1
"Purr" (as Kev1z consisting of members from Viviz, and Kep1er)	2022	— (Note: "Purr" did not enter the Gaon Digital Chart, but peaked at number 118 on the component Download chart.)	Queendom 2 Position Unit Battle 1-2
"Ka-Boom! " (as Ex-it consisting of Hyolyn, and members from WJSN)	2022	— (Note: "Ka-Boom!" did not enter the Gaon Digital Chart, but peaked at number 126 on the component Download chart.)	Queendom 2 Position Unit Battle 1-2
"Tell Me Now" (as Queen is Me consisting of members from Brave Girls, and Loona)	2022	— (Note: "Tell Me Now" did not enter the Gaon Digital Chart, but peaked at number 85 on the component Download chart.)	Queendom 2 Position Unit Battle 1-2
"Bop Bop! (Highteen version)" (Viviz)	2022	— (Note: "Bop Bop! (Highteen Version)" did not enter the Gaon Digital Chart, but peaked at number 159 on the component Download chart.)	Queendom 2 Fantastic Queendom Part 1-1
"Pantomime" (WJSN)	2022	— (Note: "Pantomime" did not enter the Gaon Digital Chart, but peaked at number 182 on the component Download chart.)	Queendom 2 Fantastic Queendom Part 1-1
"Butterfly" (Loona)	2022	— (Note: "Butterfly" did not enter the Gaon Digital Chart, but peaked at number 184 on the component Download chart.)	Queendom 2 Fantastic Queendom Part 1-2
"Red Sun (Remix)" (Brave Girls)	2022	— (Note: "Red Sun (Remix)" did not enter the Gaon Digital Chart, but peaked at number 87 on the component Download chart.)	Queendom 2 Fantastic Queendom Part 1-2
"See Sea, Bae" (Hyolyn)	2022	—	Queendom 2 Fantastic Queendom Part 1-2
"Waka Boom (My Way)" (Hyolyn feat. Lee Young-ji)	2022	— (Note: "Waka Boom (My Way)" did not enter the Gaon Digital Chart, but peaked at number 138 on the component Download chart.)	Queendom 2 Final
"Aura" (WJSN)	2022	— (Note: "Aura" did not enter the Gaon Digital Chart, but peaked at number 106 on the component Download chart.)	Queendom 2 Final
"The Girls (Can't Turn Me Down)" (Kep1er)	2022	— (Note: "The Girls (Can't Turn Me Down)" did not enter the Gaon Digital Chart, but peaked at number 154 on the component Download chart.)	Queendom 2 Final
"Red Sun! " (환상) (Viviz)	2022	— (Note: "Red Sun!" did not enter the Gaon Digital Chart, but peaked at number 65 on the component Download chart.)	Queendom 2 Final
"Pose" (Loona)	2022	— (Note: "Pose" did not enter the Gaon Digital Chart, but peaked at number 107 on the component Download chart.)	Queendom 2 Final
"Whistle" (Brave Girls)	2022	— (Note: "Whistle" did not enter the Gaon Digital Chart, but peaked at number 91 on the component Download chart.)	Queendom 2 Final
"Epilogue" (지나온)	2022	—	Queendom 2 Epilogue
"—" denotes releases that did not chart or were not released in that region.

== Ratings ==
Season 1 (2019)

In the ratings below, the highest and lowest rating for season 1 is shown in red and blue respectively.

Average TV viewership ratings
Ep.	Original broadcast date	AGB Nielsen Ratings Nationwide
1	August 29, 2019	0.5%
2	September 5, 2019	0.5%
3	September 12, 2019	1.032%
4	September 19, 2019	0.832%
5	September 26, 2019	0.962%
6	October 3, 2019	0.789%
7	October 10, 2019	0.856%
8	October 17, 2019	0.667%
9	October 24, 2019	0.6%
10	October 31, 2019	0.992%

Season 2 (2022)
- In the ratings below, the highest and lowest rating for season 2 is shown in red and blue respectively.

Average TV viewership ratings
Ep.	Original broadcast date	Average audience share
Ep.	Original broadcast date	Nielsen Korea (Nationwide)
11	March 31, 2022	0.803% (41st)
12	April 7, 2022	0.791% (42nd)
13	April 14, 2022	0.863% (42nd)
14	April 21, 2022	0.561% (55th)
15	April 28, 2022	0.644% (48th)
16	May 5, 2022	0.594% (61st)
17	May 12, 2022	0.594% (57th)
18	May 19, 2022	0.523% (69th)
19	May 26, 2022	0.502% (69th)
20	June 2, 2022	0.616% (58th)

== Spin-offs ==
On March 5, 2020, Mnet confirmed that Road to Kingdom (로드 투 킹덤) would begin filming in the middle of March, with the lineup to be confirmed. It was confirmed to be aired beginning at the end of April, with the show being hosted again by Lee Da-hee and Jang Sung-kyu. On March 20, Mnet confirmed the show's lineup would consist of Pentagon, ONF, Golden Child, The Boyz, Verivery, Oneus and TOO. The show began airing from April 30 and ended on June 18.

Kingdom: Legendary War, aired from April 1, 2021, and ended on June 3, 2021.

On January 26, 2023, Mnet announced a spin-off of the series titled Queendom Puzzle, scheduled to premiere in the first half of 2023. It premiered on June 13 and ended on August 15. Queendom Puzzle features 26 girl group members (originally 28) who are in active or inactive Kpop groups competing to be in the final lineup for a new project girl group.

On June 26, 2024, Mnet confirmed that Season 2 of Road to Kingdom, later titled Road to Kingdom: Ace of Ace, will be launched in the second half of 2024, and that the Road to Kingdom series would be re-branded as a standalone program, rather than a prequel to Kingdom.
