= Yuna (singer, born 1992) =

South Korean singer and actress (born 1992)

Seo Yu-na
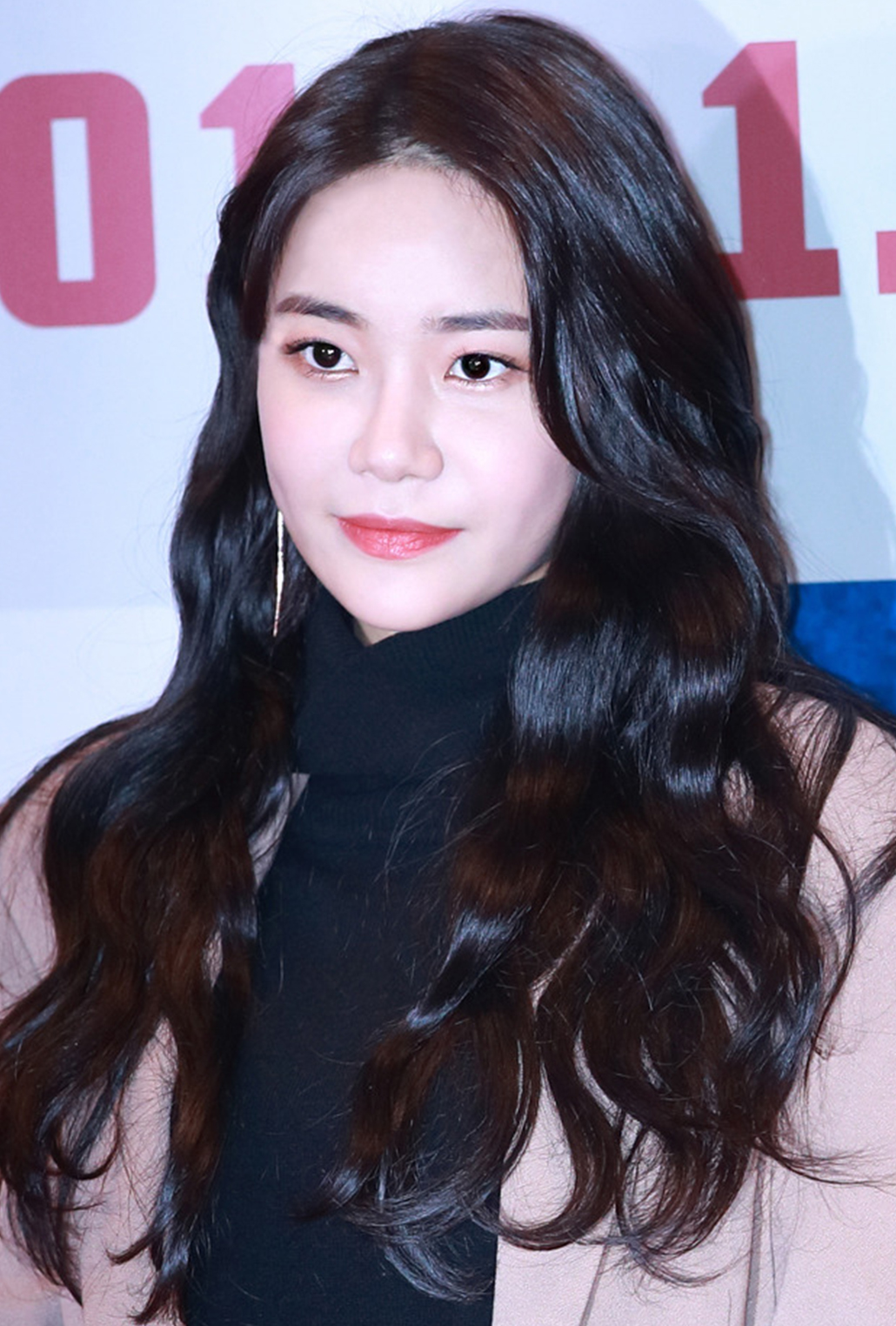
- Yuna in January 2018
- Born: December 30, 1992 (age 33); Busan, South Korea
- Other name: E.NA
- Occupations: Singer; actress; songwriter; yoga instructor
- Years active: 2012–present
- Spouse: Kang Jung-hoon (m. 2024)
- Children: 1
- Musical career
- Genre: K-pop
- Instruments: Vocals, keyboards, piano
- Label: FNC
- Formerly of: AOA; AOA Black; AOA Cream

Korean name
- Hangul: 서유나
- Hanja: 徐酉奈
- RR: Seo Yuna
- MR: Sŏ Yuna

Seo Yu-na (Korean: 서유나; born December 30, 1992), better known by the mononym Yuna, is a South Korean singer-songwriter, actress and yoga instructor. She is a former member of the South Korean girl group AOA and its sub-groups, AOA Black and AOA Cream.

== Early life ==
Seo Yu-na was born on December 30, 1992. She began playing the piano when she was seven years old, causing her to take interest in becoming a singer as an adult. At the age of 18, she traveled to Seoul alone after getting consent from her parents. She transferred schools and stayed at her uncle's house while she went to auditions and practised singing. Her younger sister Yu-ri made her debut in 2014 with girl group Berry Good under Asia Bridge Entertainment, adopting the stage name "Seoyul".

== Career ==
=== Career with AOA ===
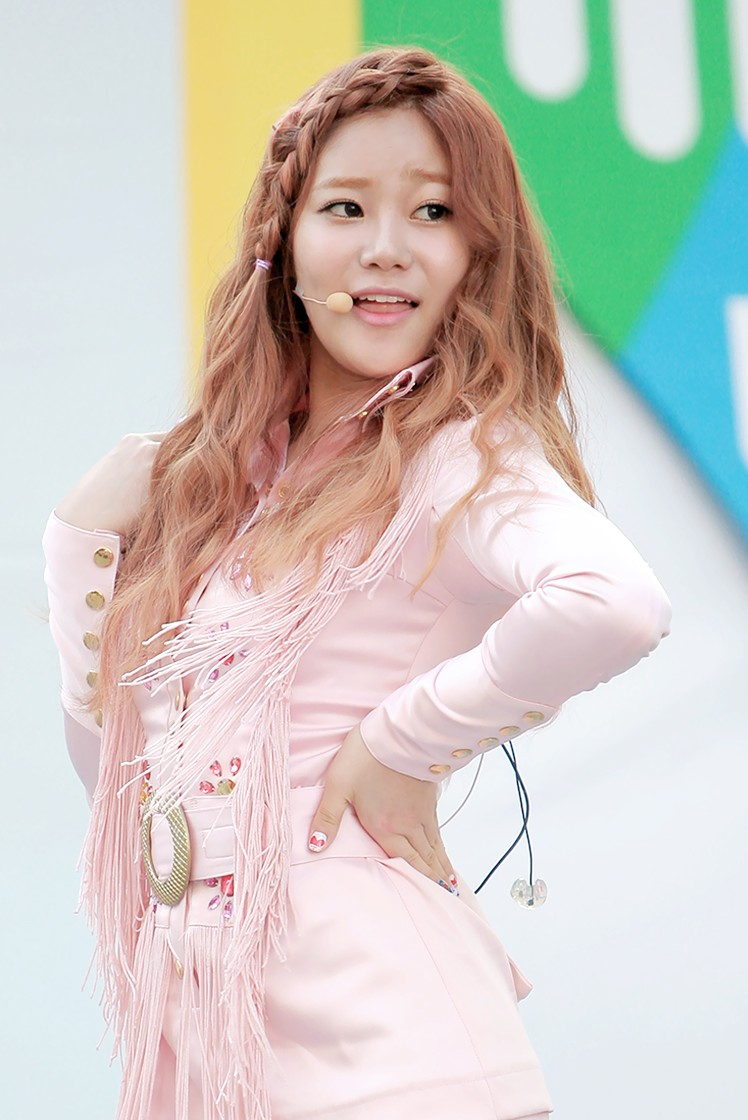
Yuna performing in 2013

On July 30, 2012, Yuna made her debut as a member of AOA on Mnet's M! Countdown with their debut single album, Angels' Story and the title track "Elvis". AOA has released three EPs and nine singles as of June 22, 2015. She is part of AOA's subunit "AOA Black". In 2015, AOA traveled to Hainan where they filmed One Fine Day, a variety program in which idols/idol groups go on a "healing" vacation. They were the seventh idol group to appear on the program.

Yuna is also part of sub-unit AOA Cream together with Shin Hye-jeong and Im Do-hwa. The sub-unit released their first teaser on February 1, 2016. The music video teaser for title track "I'm Jelly Baby" was released on February 4, 2016. AOA Cream released their title track together with the MV on February 12, 2016.

On January 1, 2021, Yuna's contract expired with FNC Entertainment, and she left the company.

=== As an actress ===
Yuna has also had a successful, yet lesser known acting career, as she has played a lead role in the Japanese Musical Summer Snow in 2013, as well as playing another lead role in the comedic Korean web-drama Prince's Prince in February 2015.

On October 20, 2013, Yuna sang for the OST "I'm Ok" for KBS's TV series Marry Him If You Dare. The song "I'm OK" is the theme song for the main character Na Mi-rae.

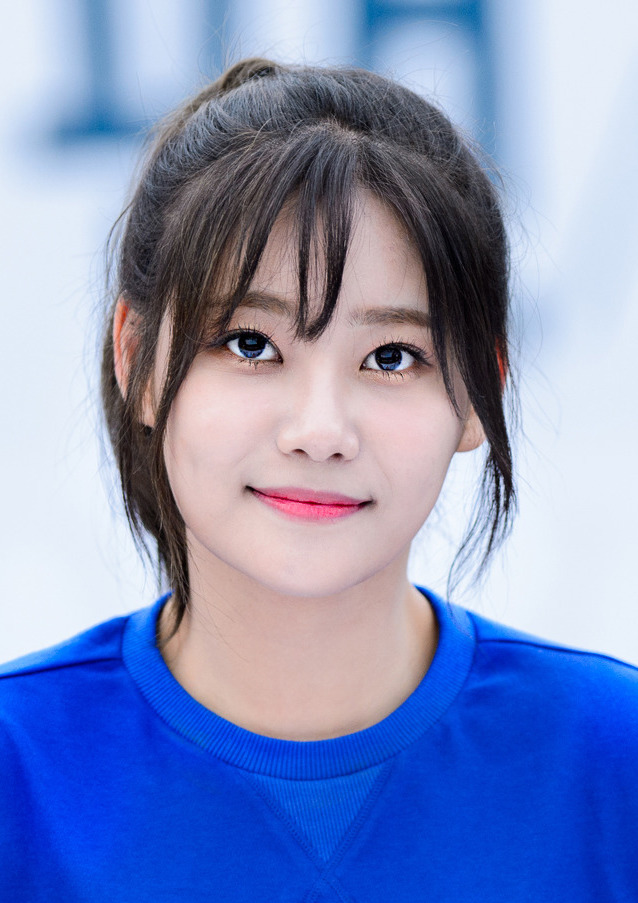
Yuna in 2016

In October 2016, it was announced that she will be part of the cast of a new web-drama Hot and Sweet playing Joon Young, a part-time food worker. The drama premiered on October 20 and ran for 8 episodes. Yuna also released two songs for the drama, one "Hot and Sweet" a duet with Choi Min-hwan and "Everything" a solo song.

Yuna was then cast in another new web-drama My Old Friend. The drama aired starting in mid-November for five episodes through Naver TVCast.

In 2017, Yuna was cast in the romantic comedy series Single Wife, scheduled for August 23. In June, she sang the theme song for drama My Only Love Song, the song is called "Another You".

Yuna sung the OST for tvN's A Korean Odyssey together with Shin Ji-min, the song is called "If You Were Me" and it was released on January 28, 2018.

In February 2019, Yuna together with Shin Hye-jeong and Im Do-hwa will take part in Lifetime's reality program AOA DaSaDanang Heart Attack Danang where the members will travel to Danang, Vietnam for an adventure. In July, she was cast in web drama Love Formula 11M as So-jin.

=== As a yoga instructor ===
After her departure from AOA, Yuna gave an update on her social media and revealed she had transformed into a yoga instructor and living a new life outside of the entertainment industry.

=== As songwriter, producer and backing singer ===
In December 2019, FNC Entertainment confirms that Yuna used her pseudonym E.NA to become a backing singer for Yuna's parts for Itzy's debut single "Dalla Dalla"; she also had credits as a vocalist in the single "Heart Shaker" by Twice. She is also credited as the backing singer for WJSN's single "Butterfly".

== Personal life ==
=== Marriage ===
Seo and music composer Kang Jung-hoon, better known as Friday of Galactika, married in Seoul on February 18, 2024. On July 4, 2025, Seo announced her pregnancy via Instagram. Seo gave birth to a daughter on November 27.

== Discography ==
=== Singles ===
Title	Year	Peak chart positions	Album
Title	Year	KOR	Album
"Ice Flower" (얼음꽃)	2023	—	Non-album single
"—" denotes releases that did not chart or were not released in that region.

=== Soundtrack appearances and solo performances ===
Year	Title	Song	Duration	Artist	Ref.
2013	Marry Him If You Dare OST	"I'm Ok"	03:13	Solo	
2016	Hot and Sweet OST	"Hot and Sweet"	03:29	with Choi Min-hwan	
2016	Hot and Sweet OST	"Everything"	03:51	Solo	
2017	My Only Love Song OST	"Another You"	03:35	Solo	
2018	A Korean Odyssey OST	"If You Were Me"	03:20	with Shin Ji-min feat. Yoo Hwe-seung	
2019	Melting Me Softly OST	"Tuk Tuk"	03:30	Solo	
2019	Woman of 9.9 Billion OST	"My Diamond"	03:46	Solo	
2020	Big Picture House OST	"Comfort"	04:35	Solo	
2021	Oh! Master OST	"Fall In Love with You"	03:28	With Kang Seung-sik	

=== Songwriting credits ===
All song credits are adapted from the Korea Music Copyright Association's (KOMCA) database unless noted otherwise.

Year	Song	Album	Artist(s)	Lyrics		Music	
Year	Song	Album	Artist(s)	Credit	With	Credit	With
2016	"Hot and Sweet"	Hot and Sweet OST	Choi Min-hwan and Yuna	Yes	Jung Jin-wook	No	
2017	"With Elvis"	Angel's Knock	AOA	Yes	Shin Ji-min, Park Cho-a, Shin Hye-jeong, Kwon Mina, Kim Seol-hyun, Kim Chan-mi	No	
2018	"Becoming the Wind"	Mr. Sunshine OST Part 7	Ha Hyun-sang	Yes	Athena	No	
2019	"The Star"	Catch the Ghost OST Part 2	Juniel	Yes	Athena	Yes	Athena
2020	"Missing You"	...LER	Kim Dong-wan	No		Yes	Athena
2020	"Every Little Thing is You"	Intersection: Spark	BAE173	Yes	Noah, Do-hyun	No	
2022	"Missing You" (그리워서)	Bloody Heart OST Part 6	Han Dong-geun	Yes	Athena	Yes	Athena
2023	"Ice Flower"	Non-album single	Yuna	Yes	—	No	
2025	"Maplelatte"	Dear.M OST Part 1	Day6 (Even of Day)	Yes	Noah	No	

== Filmography ==
=== TV series ===
Year	Title	Role	Notes	Ref.
2015	Prince's Prince	Park Yu-na		
2016	Click Your Heart	Herself	Cameo	
2016	Hot and Sweet	Joon-young		
2016	My Old Friend	Eun-jae		
2017	Single Wife	Hwang Hyo-rim		
2019	Two Hearts	Jo Ah-ra		
2019	Love Formula 11M	So-jin		
2020	Big Picture House	Nam Ga Young		

=== Musical theatre ===
Year	Title	Role	Notes	Ref.
2013	Summer Snow Musical	Seol-hee	Female lead	
2019	One More Musical	Moon Da-in	Main role	
