= Shin Hye-jeong =

South Korean singer and actress (born 1993)

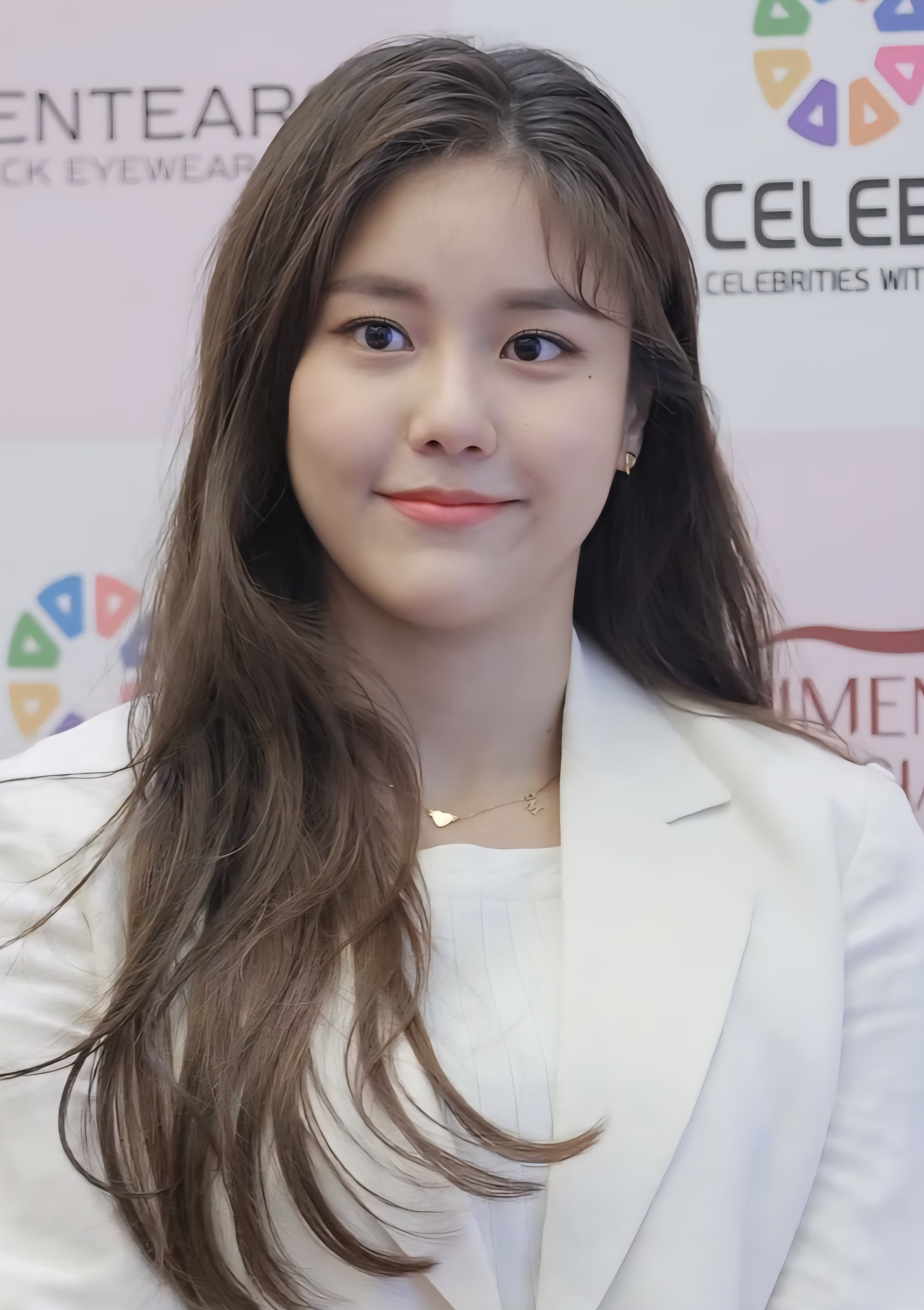
- Shin in July 2021
- Born: August 10, 1993 (age 33); Pocheon, South Korea
- Occupations: Singer; actress
- Agent: TH Company
- Musical career
- Genre: K-pop
- Instrument: Vocals
- Years active: 2012–present
- Label: FNC
- Member of: AOA; AOA Cream

Korean name
- Hangul: 신혜정
- Hanja: 申惠晶
- RR: Sin Hyejeong
- MR: Sin Hyejŏng

Shin Hye-jeong (Korean: 신혜정), better known mononymously as Hyejeong, is a South Korean singer and actress. She is best known as a member of the South Korean girl group AOA.

== Early life ==
Shin competed in a supermodel pageant until the 3rd preliminary round. There, an FNC Entertainment casting director discovered her, and she became a FNC trainee in August 2010.

== Career ==
=== Career with AOA & AOA Cream ===
On July 30, 2012, Shin made her debut as a member of AOA on Mnet's M! Countdown with their debut single, "Angels' Story" with the lead song "Elvis". Shin is also part of sub-unit AOA Cream together with Yuna and Kim Chanmi. The sub-unit released first teaser on February 1, 2016. The music video teaser for title track I'm Jelly Baby was released on February 4, 2016. AOA Cream's title track and music video was released on February 12, 2016.

=== Acting career ===
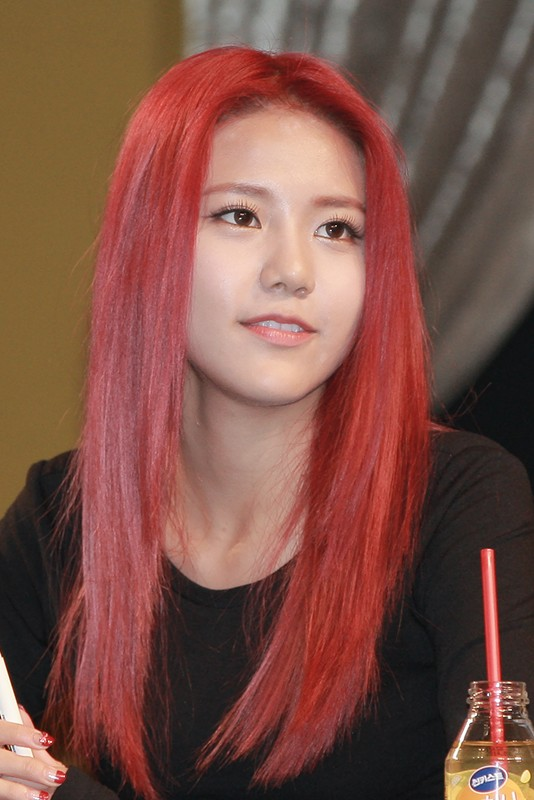
Shin at a fansigning event in 2013

On August 8, 2012, Shin appeared in TV series A Gentleman's Dignity.

Shin appeared in the music video for boy band F.T. Island's song "I Wish" from the full Korean album Five Treasure Box which was released on September 10, 2012.

In October 2012, she was cast in a supporting role in drama Cheongdam-dong Alice.

On October 19, 2012, Shin, together with eight other stars such as Nam Ji-hyun and Jun. K, had been confirmed for tvN's dating show The Romantic & Idol.

On August 6, 2013, Shin was cast for The Blade and Petal.

Shin appeared in the music video for boy band Phantom's song "Seoul Lonely" which was released on May 19, 2014. She also featured for its promotion in several music shows by overtaking Gain's part in the song.

On March 4, 2015, it was revealed that Shin will be part of MBC's new variety show Soulmate Returns.

On September 10, 2015, Shin was listed in the lineup for SBS MTV EDM program Mashup that will be aired on 21st at 11PM KST for the first time.

In 2016, Shin was cast in her first social film Mysterious Solver together with F.T. Island's Choi Min-hwan.

In March 2017, it was confirmed that Shin will join tvN's Saturday Night Live Korea for season 9. The first episode was broadcast on March 25, 2017.

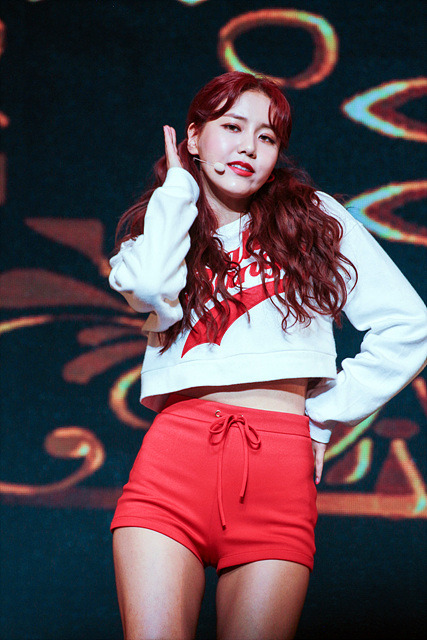
Shin performing in 2018

In January 2018, casual denim brand Buckaroo announced Shin as their new model for the 2018 S/S season.

In February 2018, it was announced that Shin will have a lead role in the SBS weekend drama Nice Witch as flight attendant Joo Ye-bin.

In 2019, Shin, along with Seo Yu-na and Kim Chanmi, took part in Lifetime's reality program AOA DaSaDanang Heart Attack Danang, where the members travelled to Danang, Vietnam for an adventure.

In February 2020, Shin was cast in upcoming tvN drama My Unfamiliar Family.

In March 2023, Shin signed with new agency TH Company.

== Discography ==
=== Soundtrack appearances and solo performances ===
Year	Title	Song	Duration	Artist
2017	Girls' Generation 1979 OST	"Love Girl"	03:42	Solo
2021	Love #Hashtag OST	"Be the light" (빛이 되어줘)	03:42	Solo

== Filmography ==
=== Film ===
Year	Title	Role	Notes	Ref.
2017	Mysterious Solver	Miss Kim		
2021	Mission: Possible		Guest appearance	
2022	Lovely Voice: The Beginning	Da-jeong	Music Film	
2023	One-piece Dandelion	Dandelion	Independent Film	
TBA	In the process of break up	Jung yeon	Short Film	
TBA	The Hotel	Hoeun		

=== Television series ===
Year	Title	Role	Notes	Ref.
2012	A Gentleman's Dignity	Na Jong-seok's daughter	Cameo	
2012	Cheongdam-dong Alice	Han Se-jin		
2013	The Blade and Petal	Dal-ki		
2018	Nice Witch	Joo Ye-bin		
2019	Romance Is a Bonus Book	Cha Eun-ho's ex-girlfriend	Cameo	
2019	Perfume	Son Mi-yu		
2020	My Unfamiliar Family	Yoon Seo-Young		
2021	Midnight Thriller – "Supermodel"	Kim Soo-min		

=== Web series ===
Year	Title	Role	Ref.
2019	Can Love Be Refunded	BJ	
2021	#LoveHashtag	Sora Jeong	

=== Television shows ===
Year	Title	Role	Notes	Ref.
2018	King of Mask Singer	Herself	Episode 159	
2015	Mashup	MC		
2016	Idol King of Cooking	Herself		
2017	Saturday Night Live Korea	Regular cast	Season 9	
2018	Busted!	Magic Girl Hyejeong	Season 1, Episode 7	

== Awards and nominations ==
Year	Award	Category	Nominated work	Result	Ref.
2018	26th SBS Drama Awards	Best New Actress	Nice Witch	Nominated	
