= AOA Cream =

South Korean girl group

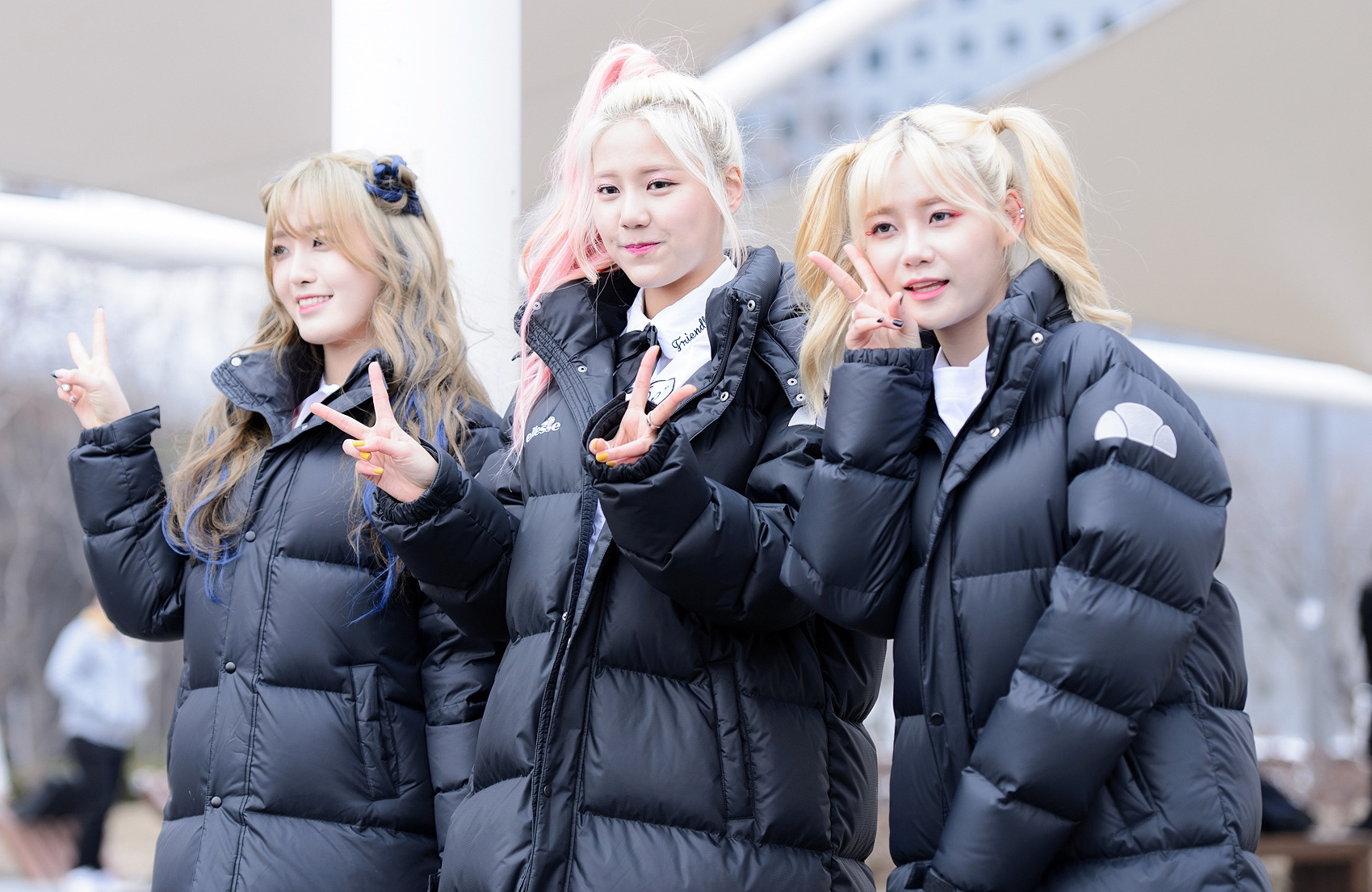
- AOA Cream in March 2016

Background information
- Origin: Seoul, South Korea
- Genres: K-pop; dance-pop; electropop
- Years active: 2016
- Labels: FNC; CJ E&M Music; Delicious Deli; Universal Music Japan
- Spinoff of: AOA
- Past members: Yuna; Hyejeong; Dohwa
- Website: fncent.com/AOACREAM

AOA Cream is a subgroup of the South Korean girl group AOA, formed by FNC Entertainment in 2016. The group is composed of AOA members: Hyejeong, Chanmi, and, Yuna. The group is known for their debut single, I'm Jelly Baby. The group has been inactive since 2016, which was followed by all the group members' departures from FNC.

== History ==
During early 2016, FNC Entertainment announced the formation of the subgroup. In early February of the same year, the label began providing teasers of the members on their upcoming debut. In 2016, they were featured in Cosmopolitan.

Their debut single, "I'm Jelly Baby", was released on February 11, 2016. The single peaked at No. 26 on the Korean Gaon charts. In late 2019, the group performed the single on the TV show Queendom.

On January 1, 2021, FNC Entertainment announced that Yuna's contract had expired.

In 2023, Hyejeong left FNC Entertainment.

On May 22, 2024, Dohwa announced through her personal social media that she had left FNC Entertainment following the expiration of her contract.

== Discography ==
=== Singles ===
Title	Year	Peak chart positions	Sales	Album
Title	Year	KOR	Sales	Album
"I'm Jelly Baby"	2016	26	KOR (DL): 168,192+	Non-album single
