= Im Do-hwa =

South Korean singer and actress (born 1996)

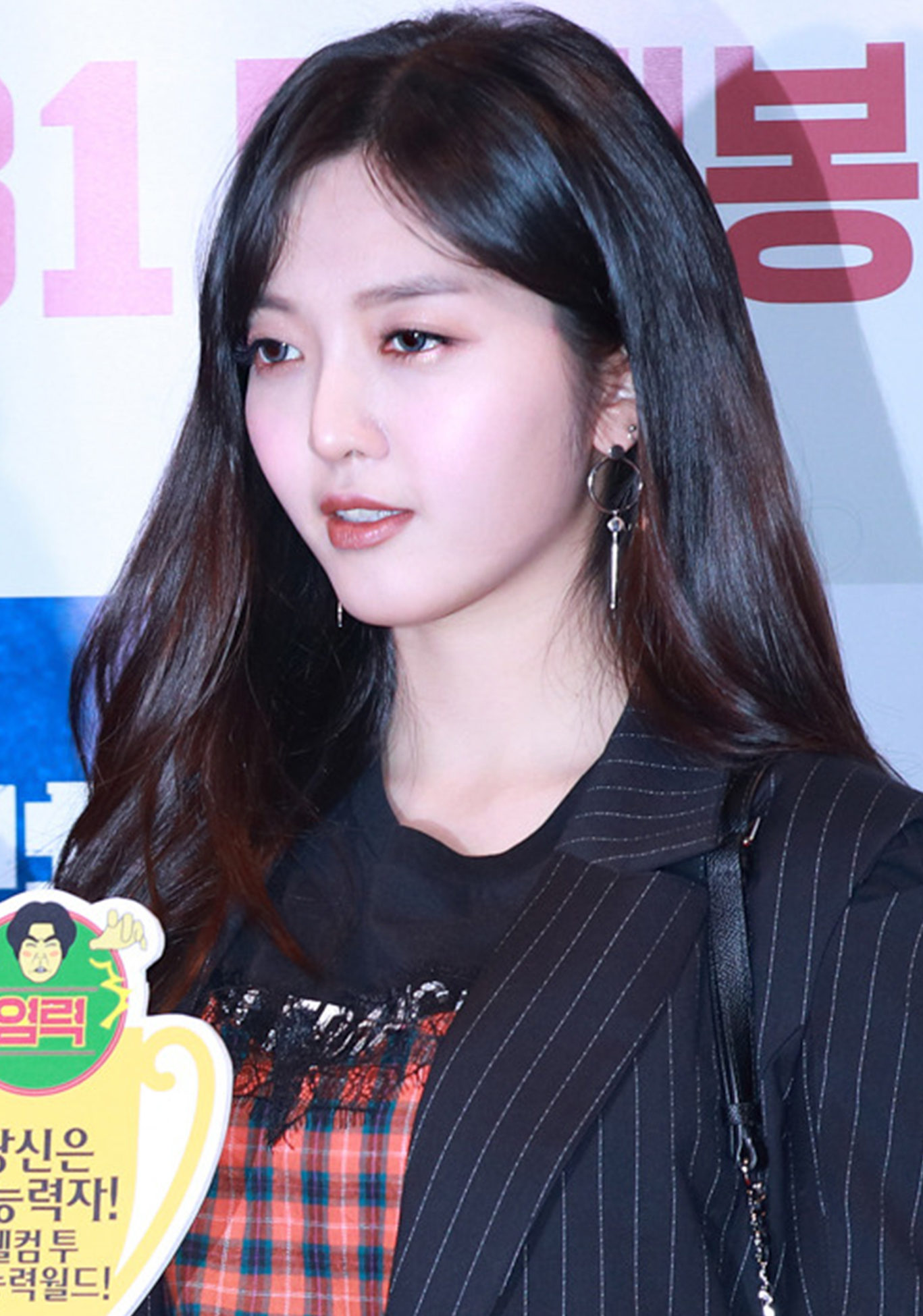
- Im in January 2018
- Born: Kim Chan-mi; June 19, 1996 (age 30); Gumi, South Korea
- Occupations: Singer; actress
- Spouse: Song Ui-hwan (m. 2025)
- Musical career
- Genre: K-pop
- Instrument: Vocals
- Years active: 2012–present
- Label: FNC
- Member of: AOA; AOA Cream

Korean name
- Hangul: 임도화
- Hanja: 林到婲
- RR: Im Dohwa
- MR: Im Tohwa

Former name
- Hangul: 김찬미
- Hanja: 金澯美
- RR: Gim Chanmi
- MR: Kim Ch'anmi

Im Do-hwa (Korean: 임도화; born June 19, 1996), born Kim Chan-mi (김찬미) and previously known mononymously as Chanmi (찬미), is a South Korean singer, dancer, and actress. She is a former member of the South Korean girl group AOA.

== Biography ==
Im was born on June 19, 1996, in Gumi, South Korea. She was enrolled into dancing school at a young age, and performed on the streets of Gumi. She and her two sisters, Kyung-mi and Hye-mi, were raised by their mother after their parents divorced when Im was in elementary school. Her mother ran a hair salon so she decided to become an idol to help her mother's financial situation. She was recruited by FNC Entertainment and became an FNC trainee during middle school.

== Career ==
=== Career with AOA and AOA Cream ===
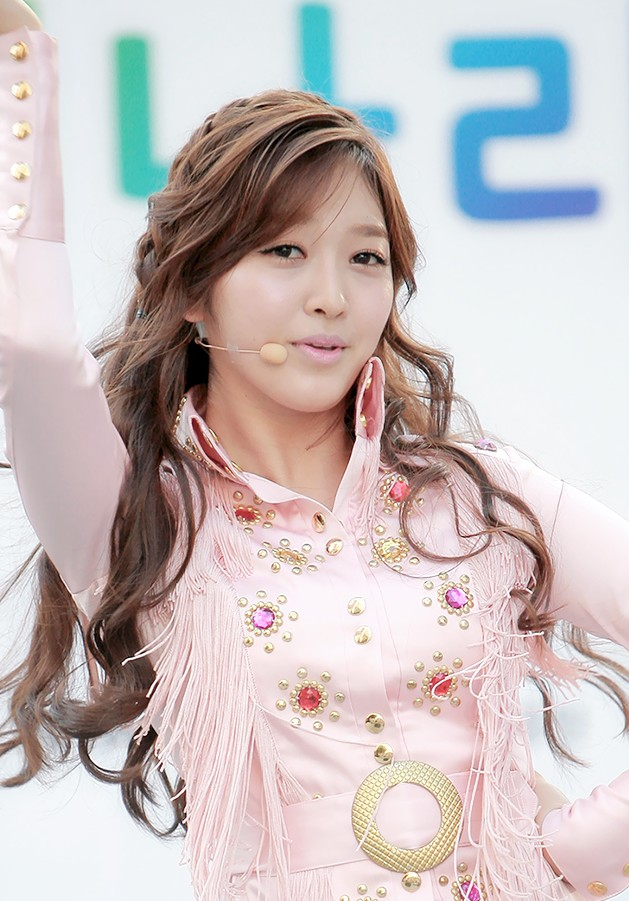
Im performing in 2013

On July 30, 2012, Im, made her debut as a member of AOA on Mnet's M! Countdown with their debut single album, Angels' Story and the title track "Elvis". AOA has released four EPs and ten singles in total.

Im is also part of sub-unit AOA Cream together with Yuna and Hyejeong. The sub-unit released their first teaser on February 1, 2016. The music video teaser for title track "I'm Jelly Baby" was released on February 4, 2016. AOA Cream released their title track together with the MV on February 12, 2016.

=== As soloist and actress ===
Im has participated in multiple solo competitions and has been recognized for her dancing and fitness skills. She made it into the final round of MBC Music's Idol Dance Battle D-Style in 2014, and performed in both a solo dance stage and a joint dance stage in MBC's DMC Festival in 2015. She also competed in KBS's Muscle Queen Project in 2016.

The singer made her debut as an actress with her first lead role in the web drama What's Up With These Kids? as Geum Hyera. She acted alongside VIXX members N and Hongbin. The drama was aired on November 16, 2016.

In March 2017, it was revealed that Im was going to star in an idol actor survival variety show called I Am An Actor. The first episode was aired in April 2017. At the conclusion of the show, Im placed first and won a role in an upcoming film entitled Lookism.

In 2019, Im, together with former AOA members Yuna and Hyejeong took part in Lifetime's reality program AOA DaSaDanang Heart Attack Danang where the members traveled to Danang, Vietnam for an adventure. In June 2019, Im was cast in web drama Love Formula 11M as Jiyoon. In November 2019 she was cast in MBC's new pilot variety show House of Sharing. The show began in broadcast in early December 2019.

On June 29, 2021, Im was confirmed to co-star alongside VIXX's Hyuk in the upcoming rom-com movie A Different Girl.

Im participated in the virtual reality competitive show Girls Reverse. which aired on January 2, 2023. She was eliminated in the preliminary vocal round. On May 27, 2023, Im was revealed to be a contestant on the reality competitive show Queendom Puzzle. On August 16, 2023, Im was eliminated in the final episode, finishing 14th overall with 229,076 points.

On May 22, 2024, Dohwa announced through her personal social media that she had left FNC Entertainment following the expiration of her contract.

On February 6, 2025, Dohwa announced on her personal social media that after leaving FNC Entertainment last year, she had signed a contract with a new company, Dante Entertain Management, to pursue her acting career.

== Personal life ==
On April 25, 2022, she changed her last name from Kim to Im, following her mother's surname. Following her appearance as Im Do-hwa on Girls Reverse, Im announced that she now wishes to use the name Do-hwa for all her future activities, and that she was looking forward to pursuing an acting career.

On May 8, 2025, Im announced her upcoming marriage via Instagram. Im married actor Song Ui-hwan on June 28, 2025.

== Discography ==
=== Singles ===
Title	Year	Album
Soundtrack appearances
"One More Chance" (with Sanha)	2019	Love Formula 11M OST
"We all love under the moonlight" (우리는 모두 달빛 아래 사랑을 하네)	2022	Refresh 2022 OST
"I like it now" (지금이 좋아)	2022	Refresh 2022 OST
"To you slowly" (그대에게 천천히) (with KCM)	2022	Refresh 2022 OST
Compilation appearances
"A midsummer night's sweetness" (한 여름밤의 꿀) (with Kim Hye-mi)	2022	DNA Singer - Fantastic Family Round 6
"Hopeless Romantic" (사랑이라 믿었던 것들은) (with Fye, Juri & Jiwoo)	2023	Queendom Puzzle ALL-ROUNDER BATTLE 1
"Overwater" (with Miru, Fye, Soojin, Seoyeon & Jiwoo)	2023	Queendom Puzzle ALL-ROUNDER BATTLE 2
"i DGA (i DONT GIVE A)" (with Yuki, Hwiseo, Yeeun, Fye, Yeoreum & Elly)	2023	Queendom Puzzle SEMI FINAL
"Last Piece" (with Hwiseo, Yeoreum, Yeeun, Elly, Jiwoo & Juri)	2023	Queendom Puzzle FINAL
"Start Over" (시작)	2024	A song that catches my ear Part.09

== Filmography ==
=== Film ===
Year	Title	Role	Ref.
2021	A Different Girl	Ji-yeon	
2022	Refresh	Hyun-joo	
2023	Love My Scent	Ah-yeong	
2025	검은령 (Black Spirit)	Su-ah / Jin-hwa	

=== Television series ===
Year	Title	Role	Notes	Ref.
2016	Entertainer	Herself	Cameo (Ep. 18)	
2017	My Father Is Strange	Herself	Cameo (Ep. 24)	
2018	Sky Castle	Herself	Cameo (Ep. 3–4)	
2020	AI Her	Joo-ri	Miniseries	
2021	The Second Husband	Herself	Cameo (Ep. 5)	
2023	Brain Works	Virtual human	Cameo (Ep. 8)	
2026	Time Slip: A Thousand and One Nights	Kim Kaesi / 김개시	Lead role (Ep. 5 ▶ The Treacherous Subject Who Bewitched the King / 왕을 홀린 간신)	

=== Web series ===
Year	Title	Role	Notes	Ref.
2016	Click Your Heart	Herself	Cameo	
2016	What's Up With These Kids?	Geum Hye-ra		
2019	Love Formula 11M	Ji-yoon		
2019–2020	The Genome Romance	Jang Heung-mi		
2020	Office Today, Romance Tomorrow	Kang Hye-mi		
2021	The Birth of a Nation	Kwak So-yeon		
2026	내 남편은 여미새 (My husband is a womanizer)(I don't Eat Trash, He's All Yours)	Park Ji-hye		
2026	이번 생에는 확실하게 죽여줄게 (I'll Kill You for Real This Life)(Burn My DEAD Husband Alive)	Kang Ah-jin		

=== Variety shows ===
Year	Title	Role	Notes	Ref.
2014	Idol Dance Battle D-Style	Contestant		
2016	Muscle Queen	Contestant		
2017	I Am An Actor	Contestant	1st place	
2017	Haha Land	Panel		
2017	Magic Control	Panel		
2018	Magic Control	Panel	Lunar New Year Special	
2018	I want to see the bookcase	Panel		
2019	Let's Meet at the Shop	Host		
2020	King of Mask Singer	Contestant	2nd Round	
2020	Idol League 2	MC		
2021	It's okay because we're family	Panel		
2022	써클 하우스 (Circle House)	Guest	Ep.10	
2022	You Quiz on the Block (Season 3)	Guest's Companion	Ep.157	
2022	DNA Singer - Fantastic Family	Contestant's Companion	Ep.12	
2023	Girls Reverse	Contestant	Eliminated in preliminary round	
2023	Queendom Puzzle	Contestant	Eliminated in final episode	
2023	King of Mask Singer	Panel Judge		

=== Web shows ===
Year	Title	Role	Ref.
2022	A Blessed Life	Host	
2022	Girl Reverse	Contestant	

== Theater ==
Year	English title	Korean title	Role	Ref.
2022	Why Did You Come to My House	우리집에 왜 왔니	Seo Jae-hee	
2024	The Killer Is Coming	킬러가 온다	Ban Hana (반하나)	
2024	The Hot Sea	뜨거운바다	Hanako (하나꼬)	
2025	Sodam's Farewell Memoir	소담씨의 이별견문록	Sodam (소담)	
