= Shin Ji-min =

South Korean singer (born 1991)

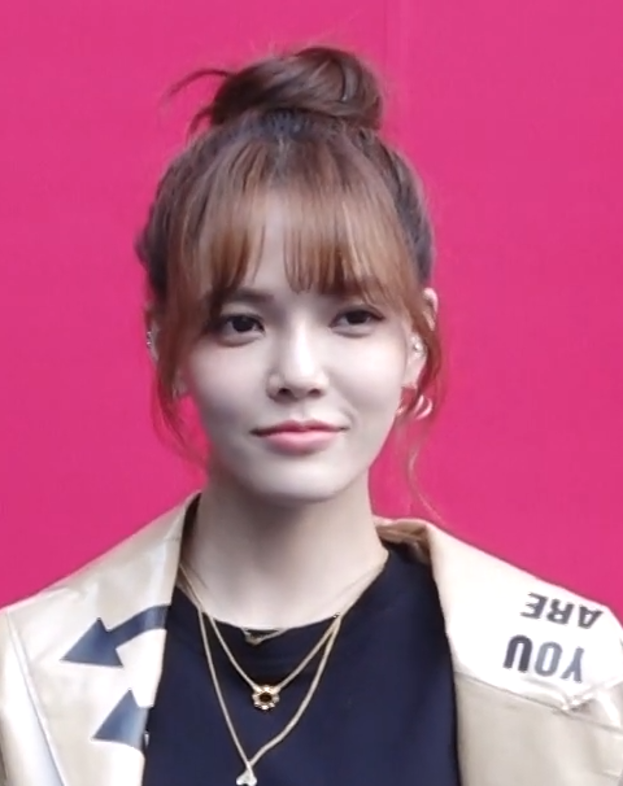
- Jimin in 2019

Background information
- Born: January 8, 1991 (age 35); Seongnam, South Korea
- Genres: K-pop; hip hop
- Occupations: Rapper; singer
- Years active: 2012–2020; 2022–present
- Labels: FNC; Alomalo Humane
- Formerly of: AOA; AOA Black
- Website: fncent.com/JIMIN

Korean name
- Hangul: 신지민
- Hanja: 申智珉
- RR: Sin Jimin
- MR: Sin Chimin

Shin Ji-min (Korean: 신지민; born January 8, 1991), better known mononymously as Jimin, is a South Korean rapper and singer. She is the former leader and main rapper of the girl group AOA and guitarist of the sub-unit AOA Black, which debuted under FNC Entertainment. In 2015, Jimin was a semi-finalist in the first season of Unpretty Rapstar. During the show, she released several successful collaboration singles, most notably "Good Start" (with Seulong) and "Puss" (with Iron). Following allegations of bullying by former bandmate Kwon Mina, Jimin left the group and retired from the entertainment industry in July 2020. She returned to the entertainment industry in July 2022.

== Early life ==
Jimin was born on January 8, 1991, in Seongnam, South Korea. She learned how to play the guitar, harmonica, and piano as a child. From her second year of middle school to her first year of high school, she studied abroad at a Chinese language school for two years. While in China, she also attended a practical music school.

== Career ==
=== 2012–2013: Debut with AOA ===
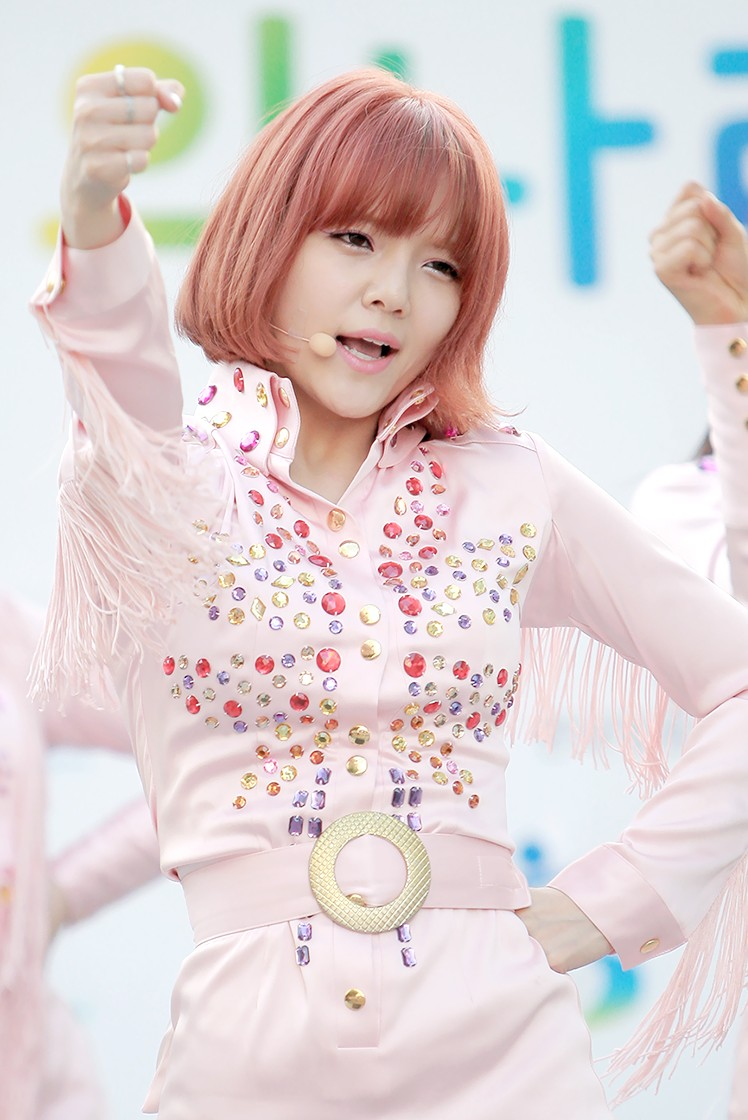
Jimin performing in 2013

On July 30, 2012, Jimin made her debut as a leader of AOA on Mnet's M! Countdown with the song "Elvis" from their debut single album, Angels' Story. She is also part of band unit AOA Black, established in 2013.

=== 2014–2016: Solo activities and Unpretty Rapstar ===
In early 2015, Jimin was part of the variety show Unpretty Rapstar, a spin-off of Show Me The Money. Unpretty Rapstar is a female rappers survival program. The show consists of a single-elimination competition through rap performances. During the show, Jimin released a few collaboration singles, such as "T4SA" with MC Meta and Nuck. Her song with Seulong, "Good Start", was produced by Verbal Jint and peaked at number two on the Gaon Singles Chart. "Puss", her rap battle song with rapper Iron during the semi-finals, peaked at number one on the Gaon Singles Chart. She was also a cast member of the variety show Off to School for four episodes, beginning March 17, 2015.

On April 28, Jimin and J.Don released the collaboration single "God". The song was produced by Rhymer of Brand New Music as part of FNC Entertainment's N Project. The song's music video was based on Game of Thrones.

Jimin debuted as a soloist on March 3, 2016, with the single "Call You Bae", featuring Exo's Xiumin. The single is the first release of Jimin's solo project #OOTD (Outfit of the Day).

=== 2017–2020: Solo activities, bullying allegations and retirement from industry ===
In October 2017, Jimin released the single "Hallelujah", a Latin-pop influenced dance track, a collaboration with magazine W Korea.

Jimin sung the OST for tvN's A Korean Odyssey together with Seo Yu-na, the song is called "If You Were Me" and it was released on January 28, 2018.

On July 3, 2020, former AOA member Kwon Mina alleged in an Instagram post that Jimin had bullied her for a decade, which led to Kwon's withdrawal from the group in May 2019. She posted a photo of her scarred wrist and claimed to have attempted suicide as a result of the bullying. Jimin reportedly responded to the accusations by posting the word "fiction" to her Instagram Stories before deleting it shortly after. Kwon criticized the post, stating, "Fiction? It's too scary to say it's fiction." The allegations led to Jimin's departure from the group and the halt of all her activities in the entertainment industry.

On January 13, 2022, FNC Entertainment announced that Jimin's contract with the company has expired.

=== 2022–present: Return to the industry ===
After a two-year hiatus from the entertainment industry, it was announced on July 14, 2022, that Jimin had signed an exclusive contract with Alo Malo Entertainment, and will be making her return to the entertainment industry. In August 2022, Jimin joined the cast of JTBC's The Second World, a survival show for girl-group rappers.

In February 2023, Jimin released her extended play Boxes alongside its lead single "Sympathy". In August 18, Jimin contract with Alo Malo Humane Entertainment expired. On December 11, Jimin released single "Twinkle Little Star" through various online music sites.

In April 13, 2024, Jimin released her music video for "Walking Talking", it comes with the message, "Travelogue of homebody (INFP) from the corner of her room, About my daily life that's lovely enough".

== Discography ==
=== Extended plays ===
Title	Details	Peak chart positions	Sales
Title	Details	KOR	Sales
Boxes	Released: February 22, 2023; Label: Alomalo Entertainment; Formats: CD, digital download	69	KOR: 1,673

=== Singles ===
Title	Year	Peak chart positions	Sales (DL)	Album
Title	Year	KOR Gaon	Sales (DL)	Album
As lead artist
"Call You Bae" (Jimin featuring Xiumin)	2016	5	KOR: 661,196	Non-album singles
"Hallelujah"	2017	—	—	Non-album singles
"Hey"	2018	—	—	Non-album singles
"Symphathy"	2023	—	—	Boxes
"Twinkle Little Star"	2023	—	—	Non-album single
"Walking Talking"	2024	—	—	Non-album single
As featured artist
"Yahae" (Kang Min-hee featuring Jimin)	2015	80	KOR: 27,633	Non-album single
Collaboration
"God" (Jimin with J.Don)	2015	38	—	Non-album single
Compilation appearances
"T4SA" (Jimin with MC Meta and Nuck)	2015	50	KOR : 76,540	Unpretty Rapstar
"Good Start" (Jimin with Lim Seul-ong)	2015	2	—	Unpretty Rapstar
"Puss" (Jimin with Iron)	2015	1	KOR: 992,890	Unpretty Rapstar
"God" (Jimin with J.Don)	2015	38	—	Non-album single
"Bing Bing Bigroom"	2017	—	—	Mix and the City
Just One More	2017	—	—	Mix and the City
"Xtraordinary" (Dawn ver.)	2022	—	—	Second World
U-Go-Girl	2022	—	—	Second World
"—" denotes releases that did not chart or were not released in that region.

=== Soundtrack appearances ===
Title	Year	Album
"If You Were Me" (Jimin and Yuna featuring Yoo Hwe-seung of N.Flying)	2018	A Korean Odyssey OST

== Filmography ==
=== Television shows ===
Year	Title	Role	Notes	Ref.
2013	Cheongdam-dong 111	Herself	FNC Entertainment reality show	
2015	Unpretty Rapstar	Contestant	Semi-finalist	
2015	Off to School	Cast member	Episode 36–39	
2015	Let's Go! Dream Team	Regular cast	Chinese version (with Chanmi)	
2016	Bon Bun Olympic	Contestant	Lunar New Year Special Program	
2017	Sherlock's Room	Main cast		
2022	The Second World	Contestant		

== Awards and nominations ==
Name of the award ceremony, year presented, category, nominee of the award, and the result of the nomination
Award ceremony	Year	Category	Nominee / Work	Result	Ref.
Melon Music Awards	2015	Hot Trend Award	"Puss" (Jimin with Iron)	Nominated	
