= Kwon Mina =

South Korean singer and actress (born 1993)

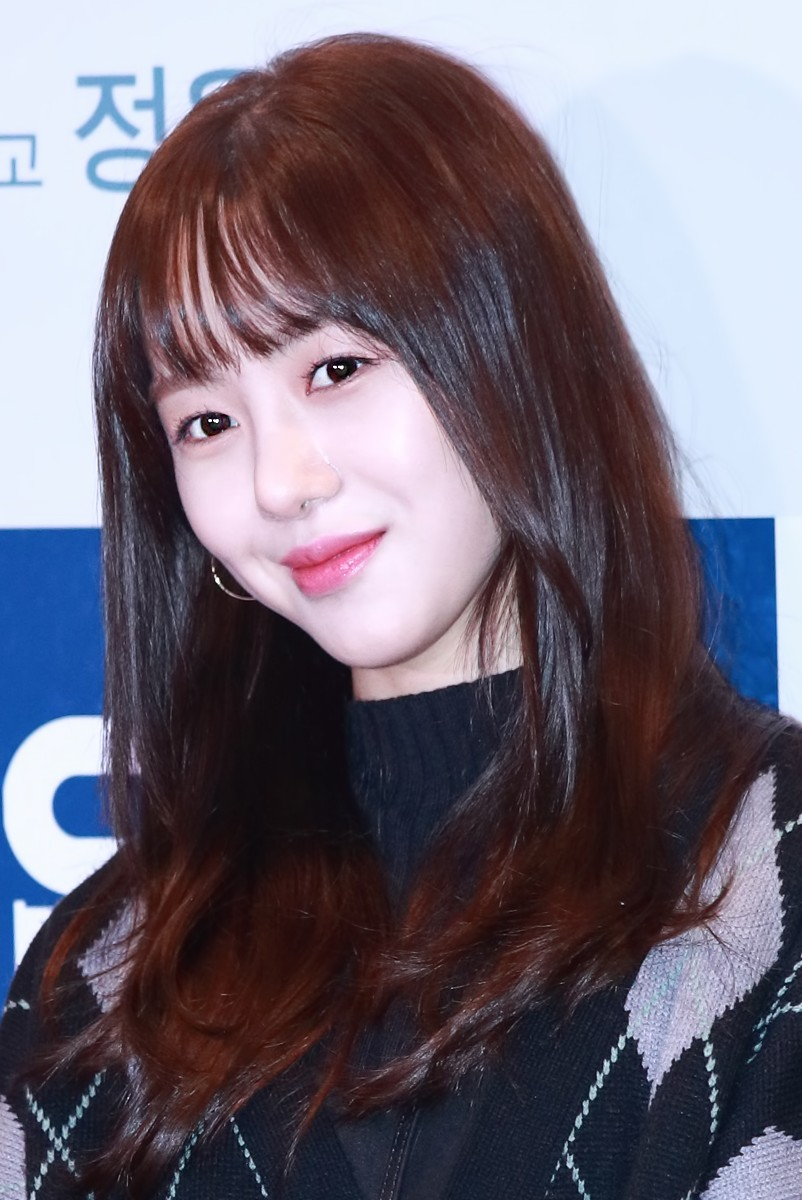
- Kwon in January 2018
- Born: September 21, 1993 (age 33); Busan, South Korea
- Occupations: Singer; actress
- Years active: 2012–2020
- Musical career
- Genre: K-pop
- Years active: 2012–2019
- Label: FNC
- Formerly of: AOA; AOA Black

Korean name
- Hangul: 권민아
- Hanja: 權珉娥
- RR: Gwon Mina
- MR: Kwŏn Mina

Kwon Mina (Korean: 권민아; born September 21, 1993), known mononymously as Mina, is a former South Korean singer and actress. She was a vocalist and rapper of the girl group AOA and bassist of the sub-unit AOA Black. Kwon has acted in television dramas, including Modern Farmer (2014) and All About My Mom (2015).

== Early life ==
Kwon was born on September 21, 1993, in Busan, South Korea. She auditioned for FNC in 2009, and her family moved from Busan to Seoul soon after.

== Career ==
=== 2012–2014: Debut with AOA and solo activities ===
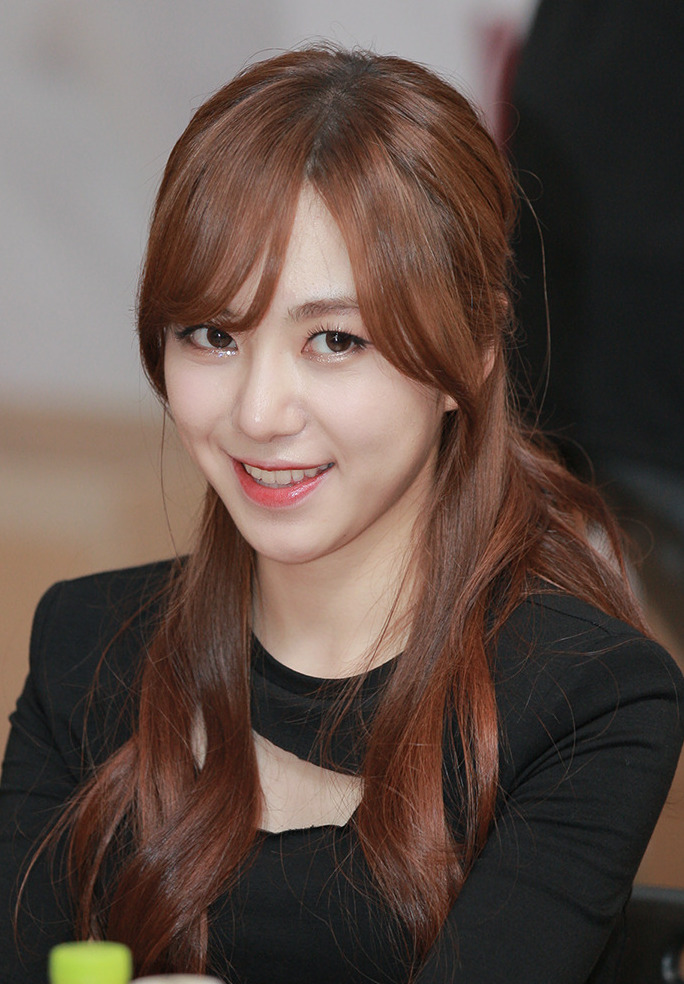
Kwon at a fansigning event in 2013

On July 30, 2012, Kwon made her debut as a member of AOA on Mnet's M Countdown with the song "Elvis" from their debut single album, Angels' Story. She was also part of band unit AOA Black, established in 2013. Due to her father's death on November 29, 2014, Kwon took some time off from career activities and did not participate in some promotions for "Like a Cat".

In 2013, Kwon debuted as an actress with the KBS2 drama special Adolescence Medley, where she played Yoon Jin-yeong. In February 2014, she played the younger role of Kim Hee-sun's character, Cha Hye-won, in the KBS drama Wonderful Days. Kwon had her first lead role in the SBS weekend drama Modern Farmer, which aired from October to December 2014.

=== 2015–2017: Continued solo activities ===
On February 26, 2015, Kwon appeared in the music video for solo singer Shade's song "Bad". In May, Kwon made her debut as an MC with Y-Star's variety show Gourmet Road. In August, she was appointed as co-MC on Weekly Idol with Apink's Hayoung and VIXX's N, starting from September 2. On September 9, Kwon and Nam Joo-hyuk appeared in the music video for solo singer Kangnam's song "Chocolate". On December 5, she joined the cast of the KBS weekend drama All About My Mom, starting from episode 33. She played Go Aeng-doo, a pretty and innocent, yet mysterious young lady.

In March 2016, Kwon starred in the seven-part web drama Click Your Heart, produced by her agency FNC Entertainment, where she played a cheerful, but clumsy, 18-year-old high school student who forms friendships and love triangles with four boys. In 2017, she has been cast in the remake of 1986's horror movie Woman's Wail, and in the hospital drama Hospital Ship as a nurse. She compiled an essay collection of quotes and wisdom that are personally meaningful to her titled Stars Don't Lose Their Way at Night that was published on November 1, 2017.

Kwon won the Hallyu Star Award at the 10th Korea Drama Awards for her role in Hospital Ship.

=== 2018–present: Continued success, group departure and label changes ===
In February 2018, it was revealed that Kwon will also join the cast of KBS weekday drama Queen of Mystery 2 as police officer Shin Na-ra. The same year, she was cast in the web drama Wind-Bell and in Loss Time Life, the remake of a Japanese drama of the same name.

On May 13, 2019, Kwon left AOA after deciding not to renew her contract with FNC Entertainment, in order to pursue her acting career.

On July 1, 2019, it was announced that Kwon had signed with O& Entertainment.

In 2020, she left O& Entertainment and signed with Woori Actors. On September 26, 2020, Kwon left the agency.

On November 28, 2025, Kwon signed a contract with Moden Berry Korea.

== Personal life ==
=== Bullying allegations against Jimin ===
On July 3, 2020, Kwon alleged in an Instagram post that AOA member Shin Ji-min had bullied her for a decade, which led to her withdrawal from the group in 2019. She posted a photo of her scarred wrist and claimed to have attempted suicide as a result of the bullying. Shin reportedly responded to the accusations by posting the word "fiction" to her Instagram Stories before deleting it shortly after. Kwon criticized the post, stating, "Fiction? It's too scary to say it's fiction." The next day, Shin apologized to Kwon through an instagram post and left AOA and the entertainment industry entirely due to the allegations.

=== Mental health ===
On August 6, 2020, Kwon posted a photograph on Instagram with the caption "Jinri-ya, I miss you", which was believed to be a reference to Sulli (Choi Jin-ri) of f(x), who committed suicide in 2019. In a separate post, Kwon revealed that she had recently been hospitalized after a relapse in self harm, following a KakaoTalk conversation she had with an FNC Entertainment representative who believed Shin's apology to be sincere. She expressed anger at the possibility of Shin resuming activities and finished the post by begging the company to be more considerate of their artists. Two days later, in a since-deleted Instagram post, Kwon shared a graphic image of her slit wrist accompanied by an apparent suicide note stating:

"I don't want to go unfairly. Shin Ji-min, Han Seong-ho, Kim Seol-hyun, live well. My mom, older sister, and family weren't able to say anything and will probably cry though they've done nothing. Compensate them all for mental distress. Please give them a lot. You're the kind of person who only knows about money. The account wasn't even settled properly, the contract was 8 years, and there was no breakdown of expenditures for the illegal trainee debt of 3 billion won ($2,522,758.80 USD). You didn't answer me when I contacted you until the end. Irresponsible people. You don't even know how I was treated for 11 years, and to the bystanders or whatever, listen carefully. Those people are all like trash that I can't even describe. Do you even know the kind of people who'll push for a sane person's death? I'm happy, but I want to go. It's painful here. Don't come to my funeral when I die. You're dirty. When I die, I'll torment you all. I can't live with this evil, okay."

FNC officials notified authorities immediately upon seeing the post and she was transported to the hospital. At the end of October, Kwon left FNC and went on a career hiatus to focus on her recovery.

== Filmography ==
=== Television series ===
Year	Title	Role	Notes
2013	Puberty Medley	Yoon Jin-yeong	Supporting role
2014	Wonderful Days	young Cha Hae-won	Supporting role
2014	Flower Grandpa Investigation Unit	Han Seul-hee	Cameo
2014	Modern Farmer	Lee Soo-yeon	Supporting role
2015	All About My Mom	Go Aeng-doo	Supporting role
2016	Click Your Heart	Mina	Lead role
2017	Hospital Ship	Yoo Ah-rim	Supporting role
2018	Queen of Mystery 2	Shin Na-ra	Supporting role
2018	Sweet Revenge 2	Herself	Cameo
2019	Wind-Bell	Yeo-jin	Lead role
2019	Loss Time Life	So-jin	Lead role

=== Reality show ===
Year	Title	Role	Notes/Ref.
2013	Cheongdam-dong 111	Herself	

=== Variety show ===
Year	Title	Role	Notes
2015	Gourmet Road	MC	
2015	Weekly Idol	co-MC	

=== Music video appearances ===
Year	Title	Artist	Notes
2015	"Flowsik"	1Week feat. Gary	

== Awards and nominations ==
Year	Award	Category	Nominated work	Result
2017	10th Korea Drama Awards	Hallyu Star Award	Hospital Ship	Won
2017	36th MBC Drama Awards	Best New Actress	Hospital Ship	Nominated
