= Wanna Be (single album) =

Single album by AOA
- Released: October 10, 2012
- Recorded: 2012
- Genre: K-pop; rock
- Length: 11:22
- Label: FNC

AOA chronology
Angels' Story (2012)	Wanna Be (2012)	Moya (2013)

Singles from Wanna Be
- 1. "Get Out" Released: October 10, 2012

Wanna Be (Wannabe on cover) is the second single album of South Korean girl group AOA. It was released on October 10, 2012, by FNC Entertainment. Its also marked their last releases as eight-member group before Youkyung's hiatus and subsequent departure in October 2016.

== Release ==
The first teaser for the title song "Get Out" music video was released on September 28, 2012, and featured all of the girls as different iconic female leads from cinema history. It was then followed up by the second teaser on October 7 which gave a glimpse of the girls performing the choreography and playing instruments.

The music video for "Get Out" was released October 9, two days earlier than stated in the teasers as a gift to the fans because it was so heavily requested. On October 10, AOA released a behind the scenes look at the making of the "Get Out" music video.

The booming, opening track "Get Out" is the title song from the single. It has an edgy rock sound featuring lead vocals from Choa. The upbeat nature of the song was intended to speak to "teenage hearts". "Get Out" appears in its "band version" on this release featuring more instrumentation than the "original version" released later to accompany their Japanese single, "Miniskirt". The "original version" is more in line with their other releases at it features a more electro-pop sound. The second song, "Happy Ending" is a more mellow ballad. The catchy chorus and simplistic lyrics give the song a light and poppy feel, showcasing the girls cute and innocent side. The final track, "My Song", is a more uplifting and stylized record featuring full band instrumentation and vocal dominance from Choa once again. This single marked the last appearance of Youkyung in the full group before her departure in October 2016.

== Concept ==
For this album, the girls all sported strong, lead female characters from popular movies. Dohwa was Hermione from Harry Potter, ChoA was Elle Woods from Legally Blonde, Hyejeong was The Bride from Kill Bill, Jimin played Mathilda from Léon: The Professional, Mina was Holly Golightly from Breakfast at Tiffany's, Seolhyun was Juliet from Romeo and Juliet, Youkyung depicted Leeloo from The Fifth Element, and Yuna was Lara Croft from Tomb Raider.

== Track listing ==
Digital and CD single:

No.	Title	Lyrics	Music	Arrangement	Length
1.	"Get Out"	Choi Young Don, Shin Ji Min	Kim Do Hoon	Lee Sang Ho	3:34
2.	"Happy Ending"	Choi Young Don, Shin Ji Min	Seung Hoon Han	Seung Hoon Han	4:07
3.	"My Song"	Gim Jaeyang, Shin Ji Min	Gim Jaeyang	Gim Jaeyang	3:30
Total length:					11:22

== Charts ==
Singles Chart	Peak position
Billboard Korea	88
Gaon	77

Chart	Period	Peak Position
Gaon	Weekly	5
Gaon	Monthly	36
