= AOA Black =

South Korean girl group

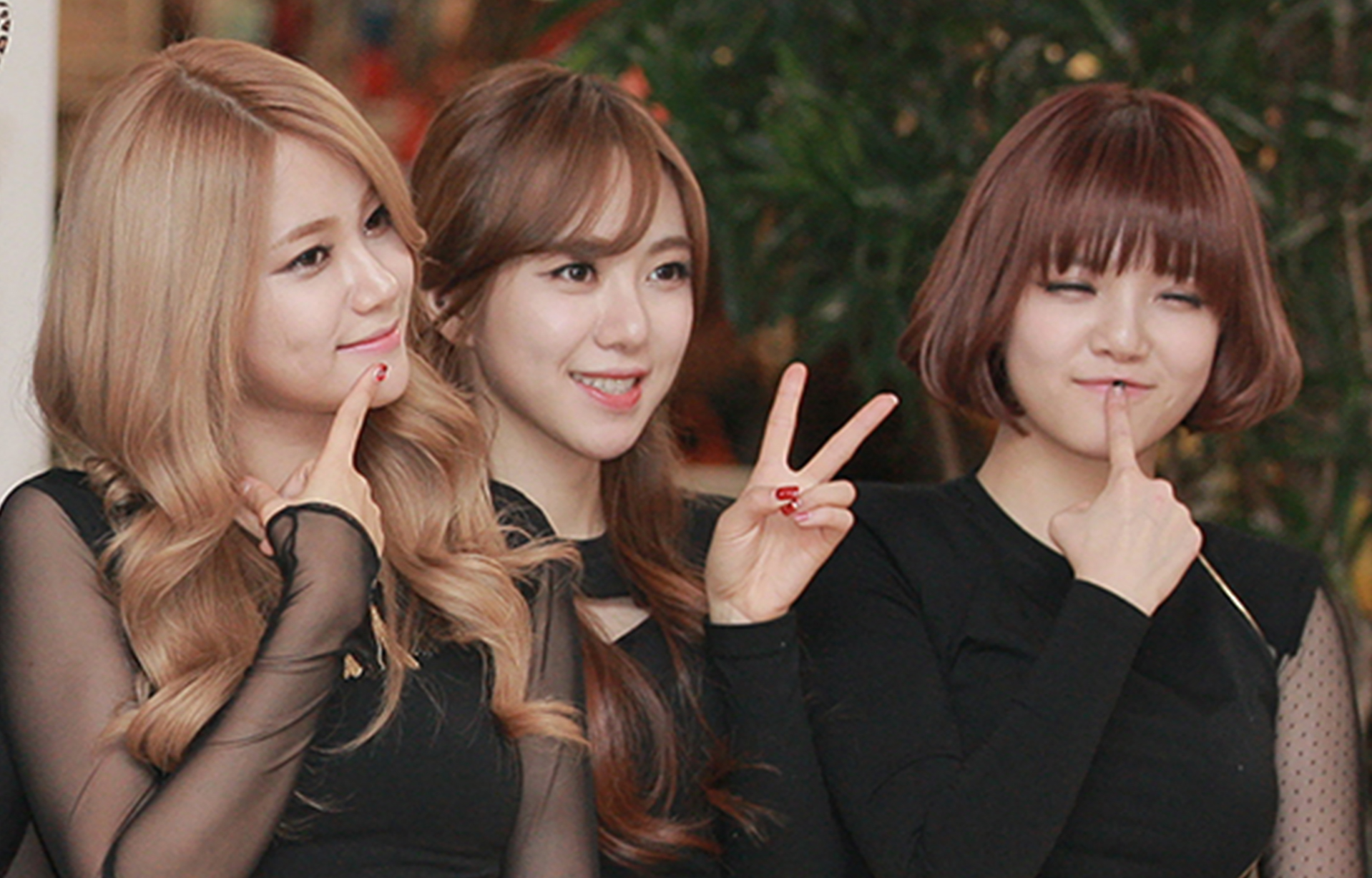
- AOA Black in October 2013; L–R: Yuna, Mina, and Jimin.

Background information
- Origin: Seoul, South Korea
- Genres: K-pop; dance-pop; electropop
- Years active: 2013–2014
- Labels: FNC; CJ E&M; Delicious Deli; Universal Japan
- Spinoff of: AOA
- Past members: Youkyung; Choa; Mina; Jimin; Yuna

AOA Black is a subgroup of the South Korean girl group AOA, formed by FNC Entertainment in 2013. The group is composed of AOA members: Choa, Mina, Jimin, Yuna, and Youkyung. The group was known for their debut single, "Moya". The group has been inactive since 2014, which was followed by all the group members' departures from FNC.

== History ==
During the early year of 2013, FNC Entertainment officially announced the formation of the subgroup. In early July of the same year, the label began providing teasers of the members on their upcoming debut.

Their debut single album, "Moya", was released on July 26, 2013.

AOA Black made their first comeback appearance on the October 10, 2014 broadcast of KM's Music Triangle and performed the band version of "Get Out" for the first time. The band made their second appearance on the October 12 broadcast of Music Bank.

In an interview made by FNC in January 2016, it was announced that the group will most likely to have their comeback.

On October 15, 2016, it was announced that Youkyung had left the agency and group following the end of her contract, but would be a guest member in any future AOA Black activities. Soon afterwards Jimin posted a photo of all eight members on Instagram with the caption simply reading "AOA".

On June 22, 2017, Choa announced her departure from AOA. FNC Entertainment initially denied the statement, but on June 30, they confirmed Choa left the group.

On May 13, 2019, it was announced that Mina would be leaving AOA after deciding not to renew her contract with FNC Entertainment in order pursue an acting career.

On July 4, 2020, it was announced that Jimin would leave AOA following bullying allegations by former member Mina.

On January 1, 2021, it was announced that Yuna would leave FNC following the expiration of her contract.

== Discography ==
=== Single albums ===
Title	Album details	Peak chart position	Sales
Title	Album details	KOR	Sales
Moya	Released: July 26, 2013; Label: FNC Entertainment; Formats: CD, digital download, streaming	9	KOR: 2,677

=== Singles ===
Title	Year	Peak chart positions		Sales	Album
Title	Year	KOR	KOR Hot	Sales	Album
"Moya"	2013	33	21	KOR: 171,597	Moya
