= I'm Jelly Baby =

Single by AOA Cream
- Released: February 12, 2016
- Genre: Dance
- Length: 3:45
- Label: FNC; LOEN
- Songwriter(s): Black Eyed Pilseung; Sam Lewis
- Producer(s): Black Eyed Pilseung

Music video
- "I'm Jelly Baby" on YouTube

"I'm Jelly Baby" (Korean: 질투 나요 BABY; RR: Jiltunayo BABY, stylized as I'm Jelly BABY) is a song recorded by South Korean girl group AOA Cream, a sub-group from the girl group, AOA. It was released as their debut single by FNC Entertainment and distributed by LOEN Entertainment on February 12, 2016, as a digital single. The lyrics were written by Black Eyed Pilseung and Sam Lewis and the music was composed by Black Eyed Pilseung. To promote the song, AOA Cream performed "I'm Jelly Baby" on several South Korean music programs, including Music Bank, Show! Music Core and Inkigayo. A music video for the single was also released on February 12.

The song was a moderate success peaking at number 26 on the Gaon Digital Chart. It has sold over 168,192 digital downloads.

== Background and release ==
On February 2, 2016, FNC Entertainment released teaser images titled "Secret Cream" featuring AOA members Yuna, Hyejeong and Chanmi, revealing that they will form the second sub-unit of the girl group, setting the release for their first music video for February 12. On February 3, it was revealed that the name of the sub-group will be AOA Cream, and the name of the song will be "I'm Jelly Baby". On February 4, the first music video teaser was revealed titled "Transform Teaser" and on February 10, the second and final teaser was released, this time showing parts of the video and parts of the song.

The song was released as a digital single on February 12 on several music portals, including iTunes for the global market. A music video for the song was released in conjunction with the song on the same day.

== Commercial performance ==
"I'm Jelly Baby" entered at number 29 on the Gaon Digital Chart on the chart issue dated February 7–13, 2016 with 52,911 downloads sold and 617,802 streams for its first two days. In its second week within the chart and first full week of sales, the song peaked at number 26 with 44,395 downloads sold and 1,114,893 streams. The song charted for five consecutive weeks on the Top 100.

The song also charted at number 47 on the Gaon Digital Chart for the month of February 2016 with 134,539 downloads sold and 2,943,880 streams.

== Track listing ==
Digital download

No.	Title	Lyrics	Music	Arrangement	Length
1.	"I'm Jelly Baby" (질투 나요 BABY; jiltu nayo BABY)	Black Eyed Pilseung; Sam Lewis	Black Eyed Pilseung	Black Eyed Pilseung	3:45

== Charts ==
=== Weekly ===
Chart (2016)	Peak position
South Korea (Gaon Digital Chart)	26

=== Monthly ===
Chart (2016)	Peak position
South Korea (Gaon Digital Chart)	47
