= Angels' Story =

Single album by AOA
- Released: July 30, 2012
- Recorded: 2012
- Genre: K-pop; electropop; dance-pop; ballad; rock
- Length: 14:09
- Label: FNC
- Producer: Kim Do-hoon; Lee Sang-ho; Kim Jae Yang; Jung Yong-hwa

AOA chronology
Angels' Story (2012)	Wanna Be (2012)

Singles from Angels' Story
- 1. "Elvis" Released: July 30, 2012

Angels' Story is the debut single album and first physical single by South Korean girl group AOA. It was released on July 30, 2012 through FNC Entertainment.

== Release ==
The album consists of 3 songs, the title track "Elvis", "Love is Only You" composed by CN Blue's Jung Yong-hwa, and a ballad called "Temptation". A band version of "Elvis" is also included on the album.

The single was released on music stores and digital music sites on July 30, 2012. The official music video was unveiled on the same day.

The music video of the band version of "Elvis", was released on August 20, 2012. The track is also included on "Angels' Story", their first album single.

== Promotions ==
AOA had a successful showcase at AX Korea last July 30, 2012 following the release of the "Elvis" MV and their album "Angels' Story".

The group did a flash mob event on August 7, 2012 along with their fans on different places in South Korea. The video is called "AOA with 50 Angels". The fans that danced with them wore wings and an AOA T-shirt.

The group made their debut on August 9, 2012 at M Countdown. They combined the album version of "Elvis" with the band version, Music Bank on August 10, 2012, and on Show! Music Core on August 11, 2012. They also appeared on the radio show ShimShim Tapa Radio and Boom's Youngstreet. The promotions for "Elvis" ended after 5 weeks and AOA performed their last stages during the 2nd week of September 2012.

== Track listing ==
No.	Title	Lyrics	Music	Length
1.	"Elvis"	Han Seong-ho	Kim Do-hoon, Lee Sang-ho	3:20
2.	"Love Is Only You"	Han Seong-ho, Jung Yong-hwa	Jung Yong-hwa	3:45
3.	"Temptation"	Han Seong-ho, Shin Ji-min	Kim Jae-yang	3:44
4.	"Elvis" (Band version)	Han Seong-ho	Ace of Angels	3:20
Total length:				14:09

== Charts ==
Chart	Peak position
Gaon Weekly Albums chart	8
Gaon Monthly Albums chart	85

== Credits and personnel ==
- AOA – vocals, rap
- Choa – Guitar
- Jimin – Guitar, rap lyricist
- Youkyung – Drums
- Mina – Bassist
- Yuna – keyboard
- Han Seong-ho, Jung Yong-hwa – producing, songwriting, arranger, music
