= Rendezvous (The Choirboys song) =

Single by The Choirboys

from the album Midnight Sun
- Released: March 1991
- Recorded: Festival and Albert Studios, Sydney, Australia
- Label: Mushroom Records
- Songwriters: Mark Tanner, Mark Gable, Ian Hulme, Lindsay Tebbutt, Brett Williams
- Producer: Marc Tanner

The Choirboys singles chronology
"Empire" (1989)	"Rendezvous" (1991)	"Place with No Love" (1991)

"Rendezvous" is a song by Australian hard rock group The Choirboys, released in March 1991 as the lead single from their third studio album Midnight Sun. The song peaked at number 40 on the Australian ARIA charts.

== Reception ==
Eric Kamau from Classic Rock History retrospectively said "'Rendezvous' is a fast-paced awe-inspiring ballad that gives us a taste of Mark Gable's vocal skillfulness. The song also features some alluring guitar riffs that make it one of the band's hard-hitting classic rock hits."

== Track listing ==
Australian CD single (D10020)

1. "Rendezvous" - 4:57
2. "Sweet Seduction" - 3:58
3. "Run to Paradise" (US Mix) - 4:30

Australian 2x 7" vinyl/ 2x CS (K 10020)

- Side A "Rendezvous" - 4:57
- Side B "Sweet Seduction" - 3:58
- Side C "Run to Paradise" (US Mix) - 4:30
- Side D "Rendezvous with Choirboys" (interview with Frank Vincent)

== Charts ==
Weekly chart performance of "Rendezvous"
Chart (1991)	Peak position
Australia (ARIA)	40
