= Nick Skitz =

Australian record producer

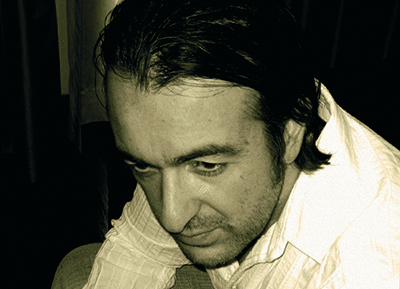
Nick Skitz

Nicholas Agamalis, better known as Nick Skitz (born 1968 in Sydney, Australia), is an Australian DJ and dance music producer. His career in dance music started in the early 1990s. Since 1995, his Skitzmix series of compilations have become well known in Australian dance circles for featuring remixes and megamixes of well-known dance songs and are the best selling DJ compilations in Australia.

== Biography ==
In 2004, he collaborated with his brother Tony Agamalis, who performs as Tony Le Rhodes and was the ex-drummer for Australian rock band the Choirboys. The two then linked up with Mark Gable, lead singer of the band, to rework their 1987 Australian hit "Run to Paradise" as a dance track. The song, billed as "Nick Skitz vs. the Choirboys", debuted in the top 20 of the Australian pop chart in July 2004, and was the 17th biggest selling dance single of that year.

In 2009 Central Station Records folded and Skitz started his own labels LNG Music and Homebrew Records.

July 2011 saw the release of Skitzmix 38, while Skitzmix 39 was released in November. In February 2012, Skitzmix 40 was released. On 28 December 2012, the single "Again & Again" (Nick Skitz and Basslouder featuring Brooklyn Bounce) was released.

August 2017 saw the release of Skitzmix 90's Anthems, a two-disc compilation of classic dance tracks from the 90's including an exclusive Skitz Megamix. 90's Anthems charted at number one on the Australian dance charts for several weeks.

== Discography ==
=== Albums ===
Album	Date	Catalogue number	Year-end ARIA chart	Highest charting	Label
Skitzmix 1	1996	COLSMCD01			Colossal Records
Skitz Is in the House	1996	COLCDHM1001			Colossal Records
Skitzmix 2	14 April 1998	CSRCD5066			Central Station Records
Skitzmix 3	1 August 1998	CSRCD5094			Central Station Records
Skitzmix 4	5 April 1999	CSRCD5098			Central Station Records
Skitzmix 5	26 July 1999	CSRCD5111			Central Station Records
Skitzmix 6	7 March 2000	CSRCD5126			Central Station Records
Skitzmix 7	31 July 2000	CSRCD5135			Central Station Records
Skitzmix 8	23 October 2000	CSRCD5146		#3 ARIA Dance	Central Station Records
Skitzmix 9	1 March 2001	CSRCD5152	#28 2001 Dance Album	#2 ARIA Dance Debut #22 Overall	Central Station Records
Skitzmix 10 (2CD)	6 August 2001	CSRCD5157	#24 2001 Dance Album (3 weeks @ #1)	#1 ARIA Dance Debut #9 Overall	Central Station Records
Skitzmix 11	12 November 2001	CSRCD5165		#2 ARIA Dance Debut	Central Station Records
Skitzmix 12	25 February 2002	CSRCD5170		#7 ARIA Compilation	Central Station Records
Ultimate Skitzmix (2CD)	2 July 2002		#22 2002 Dance Album #37 Compilation	#4 ARIA Dance Debut #2 Compilation	Central Station Records
Skitzmix 13	14 October 2002	CSRCD5177	#29 2002 Dance Album #40 2003 Dance Album	#4 ARIA Dance Debut #4 Compilation	Central Station Records
Skitzmix 14	3 March 2003	CSRCD5183	#19 2003 Dance Album	#2 ARIA Dance Debut #3 Compilation	Central Station Records
Skitzmix 15 (2CD)	14 July 2003	CSRCD5187	#13 2003 Dance Album #37 Compilation	#1 ARIA Dance Debut #2 Compilation	Central Station Records
Skitzmix 16	27 October 2003	CSRCD5192	#30 2003 Dance Album #37 2004 Dance Album	#2 ARIA Dance Debut #5 Compilation	Central Station Records
Skitzmix 17	1 March 2004	CSRCD5196	#22 2004 Dance Album	#1 ARIA Dance Debut #2 Compilation	Central Station Records
Skitzmix 18 (CD/DVD)	12 July 2004	CSRCD5207	#10 2004 Dance Album #35 2004 Compilation	#2 ARIA Dance #4 Compilation	Central Station Records
Skitzmix 19	18 October 2004	CSRCD5222	#25 2004 Dance Album #39 2005 Dance Album	#2 ARIA Dance #8 Compilation	Central Station Records
Skitzmix 20 (2CD)	18 July 2005	CSRCD5244 Re-Release LNGA0067 #17 2005 Dance Album	#3 ARIA Dance #5 Compilation		Central Station Records
Skitzmix 21	3 October 2005	CSRCD5278 Re-Release LNGA0068	#30 2005 Dance Album	#3 ARIA Dance #4 Compilation	Central Station Records
Skitzmix 22	13 February 2006	CSRCD5307 Re-Release	#29 2006 Dance Album	#7 ARIA Dance #8 Compilation	Central Station Records
Skitzmetal	13 February 2006	CSRCD5308	#47 2006 Dance Album	#8 ARIA Dance	Central Station Records
Skitzmix 23	7 October 2006	CSRCD5345	#33 2006 Dance Album	#6 ARIA Dance	Central Station Records
Skitzmix 24 (CD/DVD)	16 October 2006	CSRCD5375	#32 2006 Dance Album	#7 ARIA Dance	Central Station Records
Skitzmix 25	2 May 2007	CSRCD5394	#41 2007 Dance Album	#5 ARIA Dance	Central Station Records
Skitzmix 26	24 July 2007	CSRCD5422 Re-Release LNGA0073	#46 2007 Compilation #30 2007 Dance Album	#3 ARIA Dance #4 Compilation	Central Station Records
Skitz Rocks 1					
Skitzmix 27	20 October 2007	CSRCD5464 Re-Release LNGA0074	#24 2007 Dance Album	#3 ARIA Dance #4 Compilation	Central Station Records
Skitzmix 28	16 February 2008	CSRCD5499 Re-Release LNGA0075	#37 2008 Dance Album	#4 ARIA Dance #6 Compilation	Central Station Records
Skitzmix 29	12 July 2008	CSRCD5545 Re-Release LNGA0076	#50 2008 Compilation #29 2008 Dance Album	#3 Dance Album #5 Compilation	Central Station Records
Skitzmix 30 (2CD + DVD)	25 October 2008	CSRCD5560/1 CSRCD5560/2 CSRCD5560/3	#30 2008 Dance Album	#6 ARIA Dance #8 Compilation	Central Station Records
Skitzmix 31	20 March 2009	LNGA0001	#32 2009 Dance Album	#7 ARIA Dance	LNG Music Australia
Skitz Rocks Vol.2	30 May 2009	LNGA0003	#47 2009 Dance Album	#6 ARIA Dance	LNG Music Australia
Skitzmix 32	24 July 2009	LNGA0006	#28 2009 Dance Album	#5 ARIA Dance	LNG Music Australia
Skitzmix 33 (2CD)	6 November 2009	LNGA0014	#31 2009 Dance Album	#3 ARIA Dance #7 Compilation	LNG Music Australia
Skitzmix 34	29 January 2010	LNGA0034	#25 2010 Dance Album	#4 ARIA Dance #6 Compilation	LNG Music Australia
Pump It 1 (Platinum Deejayz)	27 March 2010	LNGA0023	#49 2010 Compilation #23 2010 Dance Album	#3 ARIA Dance #5 Compilation	LNG Music Australia
Skitz Rocks 3	4 June 2010	LNGA0022		#7 ARIA Dance	LNG Music Australia
Skitzmix 35 (2CD)	20 August 2010	LNGA0028	#38 2010 Dance Album	#3 ARIA Dance #7 Compilation Top 5 iTunes	LNG Music Australia
Pump It 2 (Platinum Deejayz)	24 September 2010	LNGA0030	#22 2010 Dance Album	#1 ARIA Dance #3 Compilation	LNG Music Australia
Skitzmix 36 (CD/DVD)	5 November 2010	LNGA0033	#41 2010 Dance Album	#5 ARIA Dance #7 Compilation	LNG Music Australia
Skitzmix 37	18 February 2011	LNGA0036	#42 2011 Dance Album	#3 ARIA Dance #7 Compilation	LNG Music Australia
Pump It 3 (Platinum Deejayz)	25 March 2011	LNGA0039	#33 2011 Dance Album	#1 ARIA Dance #7 Compilation Top 5 iTunes	LNG Music Australia
Skitzmix 38	15 July 2011	LNGA0041	#45 2011 Dance Album	#6 ARIA Dance #9Compilation	LNG Music Australia
Pump It 4 (Platinum Deejayz)	23 September 2011	LNGA0047	#29 2011 Dance Album	#3 ARIA Dance #3 Compilation	LNG Music Australia
Skitzmix 39 (CD/DVD)	11 November 2011	LNGA0048	#44 2011 Dance Album	#5 ARIA Dance #9 Compilation	LNG Music Australia
Skitzmix 40 (3CD)	24 February 2012	LNGA0053	#27 2012 Dance Album	#2 ARIA Dance #2 Compilation	LNG Music Australia
Pump It 5 (Platinum Deejayz)	5 April 2012	LNGA0054	#37 2012 Compilation #2012 Dance Album	#2 ARIA Dance #4 Compilation Top 3 iTunes	LNG Music Australia
Skitzmix 41	13 July 2012	LNGA0059	#40 2012 Dance Album	#2 ARIA Dance	LNG Music Australia
Skitzmix 42 (CD/DVD)	26 October 2012	LNGA0060	#35 2012 Dance Album	#2 ARIA Dance #6 Compilation	LNG Music Australia
Skitzmix 43	22 March 2013	LNGA0086	#49 2013 Dance Album	#5 ARIA Dance #6 Compilation	LNG Music Australia
Skitzmix 44	26 July 2013	LNGA0091		#12 ARIA Dance #5 iTunes Debut	LNG Music Australia
Pump It 8 (Platinum Deejayz)	4 October 2013	LNGA0093	#45 2013 Dance Album	#6 ARIA Dance Top 3 on iTunes	LNG Music Australia
Skitzmix 45 (2CD)	29 November 2013	LNGA0092		#12 ARIA Dance	LNG Music Australia
Skitzmix 46 (2CD)	28 March 2014	LNGA0110			LNG Music Australia
Skitzmix 47 (2CD)	25 July 2014	LNGA0111			LNG Music Australia
Skitzmix 48 (2CD)	14 November 2014	LNGA0112			LNG Music Australia
Skitzmix 49 (2CD)	6 March 2015	LNGA0155			LNG Music Australia
Skitzmix 50 (2CD + DVD)	11 September 2015	LNGA0156			LNG Music Australia
Skitzmix 51 (2CD)	11 March 2016	LNGA0166			LNG Music Australia
Skitzmix 52 (2CD)	26 August 2016	LNGA0170			LNG Music Australia
Skitzmix 53 (2CD)	20 January 2017	LNGA0171			LNG Music Australia
Skitzmix 90's Anthems (2CD)	18 August 2017	LNGA0188			LNG Music Australia
Skitzmix 54 (2CD)	18 May 2018	LNGA0199			LNG Music Australia
Skitzmix 55 (2CD)	15 February 2019	LNGA2013			LNG Music Australia
Skitzmix 56 (2CD)	16 August 2019	LNGA0236			LNG Music Australia
Skitzmix 57 (2CD)	13 March 2020	LNGA0244			LNG Music Australia
Skitzmix 58 (2CD)	24 December 2020	LNGA0253			LNG Music Australia
Skitzmix 59 (2CD)	29 October 2021	LNGA0259			LNG Music Australia
Skitzmix 60 (2CD)	29 November 2024	LNGA0279			LNG Music Australia
Skitzmix 61 (2CD)	23 January 2026	LNGA0287			LNG Music Australia

=== Charting singles ===
List of singles, with selected chart positions
Title	Year	Chart positions
Title	Year	AUS
"Excalibur 2001"	2001	62
"Slave to the Music"	2003	19
"Run to Paradise" (vs the Choirboys)	2004	16
"I Want Your Love" (featuring Melissa Tkautz)	2008	62
