= Feel the Heat =

Feel the Heat can refer to any of the following:

- "Feel the Heat" (song), by Beautiful People
- Feel the Heat (book), 2009 Romantic Intrigue Award winner
- Feel the Heat (album), by the Radiators
