= Gravedancer =

Gravedancer or Gravedancers may refer to:

- "Gravedancer", a song by Velvet Revolver from the album Libertad
- The Gravedancers, a 2006 American horror film
- Grave Dancers Union, a 1992 album by Soul Asylum
- "Gravedancer", a song from the 2004 album Terrifyer by Pig Destroyer

== See also ==
- "Gravedancing", an episode of Caprica
- Dancing on the Grave
- Dancing on the Grave of Rock n' Roll
- Dance on My Grave
