= Never Gonna Die (song) =

Single by The Choirboys

from the album Choirboys
- B-side: "Bullshit"
- Released: July 1983
- Recorded: Albert Studios, Sydney, Australia
- Length: 3:50
- Label: Albert Productions
- Songwriter(s): Mark Gable, Brad Carr
- Producer(s): Jim Menzie, Vanda & Young

The Choirboys singles chronology
"Never Gonna Die" (1983)	"Talk Big" (1983)

"Never Gonna Die" is a song by Australian hard rock group the Choirboys, released in July 1983 as their debut and lead single from their self-titled debut studio album. The song peaked at number 30 on the Australian Kent Music Report.

The band said the song was originally called "I Like Your Eyes" and was recorded in the same studio used by AC/DC, The Angels and Rose Tattoo

American group Rough Cutt covered the song in 1985

== Track listing ==
Australian 7" vinyl (AP-1009)

- Side A "Never Gonna Die" - 3:50
- Side B "Bullshit" 3:57

== Charts ==
Weekly chart performance for "Never Gonna Die"
Chart (1983)	Peak position
Australia (Kent Music Report)	30
