= Life's a Gamble =

Life's a Gamble may refer to:

- Life's a Gamble (The Radiators album), 1984
- Life's a Gamble (Rich the Kid album), 2024
- Zindagi Ek Juaa (lit. 'Life's a Gamble'), a 1992 Indian Hindi-language film
- Zindagi Shatranj Hai (lit. 'Life's a Gamble'), a 2023 Indian Hindi-language film
- "Life's a Gamble", a song by Jay Rock from the album Follow Me Home
