= Run to Paradise =

Single by The Choirboys

from the album Big Bad Noise
- B-side: "Struck by Lightning"
- Released: 31 August 1987
- Genre: Hard rock, pub rock
- Length: 4:08
- Label: Mushroom
- Songwriters: Mark Gable, Brad Carr
- Producers: Peter Blyton, Brian McGee, Choirboys

The Choirboys singles chronology
"Fireworks" (1986)	"Run to Paradise" (1987)	"Boys Will Be Boys" (1988)

"Run to Paradise" is a song by Australian hard rock band The Choirboys which reached No. 3 on the Australian Kent Music Report Singles Chart in December 1987. The related Big Bad Noise album peaked at No. 5, and was the twenty-first highest-selling album of 1988 in Australia. In New Zealand, "Run to Paradise" attained No. 13 on the RIANZ Singles Chart. Released in the United States in 1989, it appeared on the Billboard Hot 100 and Mainstream Rock charts. The song was re-worked for a 2004 release credited to Nick Skitz vs. Choirboys and reached No. 16 on the ARIA Singles Chart. In January 2018, as part of Triple M's "Ozzest 100" Australia Day countdown of Australian songs, "Run to Paradise" was ranked number 24.

== Background ==
The song is about misspent youth, though upon release in 1987 it was widely believed to be about heroin use due to the lyrics "You don’t need a friend when you can score / You run to paradise". Songwriter Mark Gable said: "It’s not specifically about heroin, … it’s more about misspent youth, the waste I saw in the ’70s on the northern beaches of Sydney. It’s more about being on the dole, surfing instead of working, smoking dope and drinking, people getting trashed in pubs on the weekend."

The Choirboys signed with Mushroom Records and released "Fireworks" in May 1986, they also opened for Deep Purple on their tour of Australia. Brad Carr left the group to be replaced on lead guitar by Brett Williams (ex-Brakes) as they supported Bon Jovi's tour in 1987. They recorded their second album Big Bad Noise with producers Peter Blyton (The Radiators, Machinations) and Brian McGee (The Rolling Stones, Cyndi Lauper). The next single "Run to Paradise" reached No. 3 in December. In New Zealand, it attained No. 13 on the RIANZ Singles Chart. Released in the United States, it appeared on the Billboard Hot 100 and peaked at No. 33 on the Mainstream Rock chart in 1989. Big Bad Noise peaked at No. 5 on the Kent Music Report Albums Chart in April 1988, and was the twenty-first highest-selling album for the year in Australia. Other singles from the album included "Boys Will Be Boys" and "Struggle Town" reaching No. 14 and No. 34 respectively.

In 1998, as part of Mushroom Records' 25th anniversary and concert (showcasing its biggest artists), "Run to Paradise" was reissued on CD Single (for the first time). A rare instrumental version of the song was a bonus track.

The song returned to the Australian singles charts in Australia in July 2004 when dance producer Nick Skitz asked Gable to sing "Run to Paradise" on a dance reworking. The song, billed as "Nick Skitz vs. Choirboys", debuted in the top 20 of the Australian singles charts and stayed in the charts for six weeks before leaving the top 50.

Jay Parrino performed the song during the semi-finals of Australia's Got Talent 2009. With his 'one-man-band' act he recorded live drums into a loop station then played guitar and sang over the top. This arrangement has a swinging 12/8 shuffle feel which is different from the original.

== Track listings ==
Australian 7" vinyl

1. "Run to Paradise" (Mark Gable, Brad Carr) – 4:08
2. "Struck by Lightning" (Gable, Ian Hulme, Lindsay Tebbutt) – 3:32

Australian 12" vinyl

1. "Run to Paradise" (Gable, Carr) – 4:08
2. "Struck by Lightning" (Gable, Hulme, Tebbutt) – 3:32
3. "One Hot Day" (Gable, Carr) – 3:28

US 7" vinyl

1. "Run to Paradise" (Gable, Carr) – 4:08
2. "Gasoline" (Gable, Carr) – 3:56

== Personnel ==
Choirboys

- Brett Williams – lead guitar
- Mark Gable – lead vocals, guitar
- Ian Hulme – backing vocals, bass guitar
- Lindsay Tebbutt – drums

Production details

- Producer – Peter Blyton, Brian McGee, Choirboys
- Engineer – Greg Henderson, McGee, Mike Duffy
  - Assistant engineer – Angie Cooper, Paula Jones, Mark Thomas, Kathy Nauton
  - Cutting engineer – Rick O'Neil
- Studio – Studios 301, Rhinoceros, Festival, Glebe Studios, Alberts and Platinum Studios
  - Mixing studio – Rhinoceros
- Cover design, inner sleeve – Studio David (David Wardle, Therese Strelein, Rebecca Strelein)
- Cover photography – Sue Stubbs

== Charts ==
=== Weekly charts ===
Chart (1987–1989)	Peak position
Australia (Australian Music Report)	3
New Zealand (Recorded Music NZ)	13
US Billboard Hot 100	80
US Mainstream Rock (Billboard)	33

Nick Skitz vs. The Choirboys version

Chart (2004)	Position
Australia (ARIA)	16

=== Year-end charts ===
Chart (1987)	Position
Australia (Australian Music Report)	45

Chart (1988)	Position
Australia (ARIA)	25

== Certifications ==
Certifications for "Run to Paradise"
Region	Certification	Certified units/sales
New Zealand (RMNZ)	Platinum	30,000^{‡}
^{‡} Sales+streaming figures based on certification alone.
