= Struggle Town =

Single by The Choirboys

from the album Big Bad Noise
- B-side: "Last Night of My Life"
- Released: May 1988
- Recorded: Festival and Albert Studios, Sydney, Australia
- Label: Mushroom Records
- Songwriters: Mark Gable, Brad Carr, Lindsay Tebbutt
- Producers: Brian McGee, Choirboys

The Choirboys singles chronology
"Boys Will Be Boys" (1988)	"Struggle Town" (1988)	"Empire" (1989)

"Struggle Town" is a song by Australian hard rock group The Choirboys, released in May 1988 as the fourth and final single from their second studio album Big Bad Noise. The song was written about Queanbeyan and peaked at number 28 on the Australian ARIA charts.

== Track listing ==
Australian 7" vinyl (K 540)

- Side A "Struggle Town"
- Side B "Let's Party" (recorded Live At The Melbourne Music Show in February 1988)

== Charts ==
Weekly chart performance of Struggle Town
Chart (1988)	Peak position
Australia (ARIA)	28
