= Give Me Love =

Give Me Love may refer to:

- "Give Me Love (Give Me Peace on Earth)", a 1973 song by George Harrison
- "Give Me Love" (Ed Sheeran song), 2012
- "Give Me Love" (2PM song), 2013
- "Give Me Love" (Hey! Say! JUMP song), 2016
- "Give Me Love", a 1978 song by Cerrone from Supernature (Cerrone III)
- "Give Me Love", a 1978 song by Miriam Stockley from the 1986 Indian film Janbaaz
- "Give Me Love", a 2015 song by Ciara from Jackie
- "Give Me Love", a 2018 song by Don Diablo from Future

== See also ==
- "Give Me the Love", a 2016 song by AOA
- Gimme Love (disambiguation)
