= Gimme Love =

Gimme Love may refer to:

- "Gimme Love" (Alexia song), 1998
- "Gimme Love" (Joji song), 2020
- "Gimme Love" (Matt B and Eddy Kenzo song), 2022
- "Gimme Love" (Seyi Shay song), 2018
- "Gimme Love" (Sia song), 2024
- Gimmie Love Tour, a 2015 concert tour by Carly Rae Jepsen
- "Gimme Love", a song by Carly Rae Jepsen on her 2015 album Emotion
- "Gimme Love", a song by Eddie Meduza

== See also ==
- "Gimme the Love", a 2016 song by Jake Bugg
- Gimme .... Live, a 1988 live album by The Radiators
- Give Me Love (disambiguation)
