= You Have the Right to Remain Silent (EP) =

EP by The Radiators
- Released: June 1981
- Studio: Music Farm Studios, Trafalgar Studios; NSW, Australia
- Label: WEA
- Producer: Charles Fisher, The Radiators

The Radiators chronology
Feel the Heat (1980)	You Have the Right to Remain Silent (1981)	Up for Grabs (1981)

You Have the Right to Remain Silent is the debut extended play by Australian band The Radiators. The ep was released in June 1981 and includes three tracks from the band's debut studio album Feel the Heat, released a year earlier. The ep peaked at number 58 on the Australian Albums Chart and was certified platinum.

== Track listing ==
Side A
No.	Title	Writer(s)	Length
1.	"(I Wish I Was) 17"	Brian Nichol	5:13
2.	"Summer Holiday"	Nichol	4:29

Side B
No.	Title	Writer(s)	Length
1.	"Comin' Home"	Geoff Turner	3:06
2.	"Fess' Song"	Nichol	4:25
3.	"Gimme Head"	Turner	2:40

== Charts ==
Chart (1981)	Peak position
Australian Chart (Kent Music Report)	58

== Certifications ==
Region	Certification	Certified units/sales
Australia (ARIA)	Platinum	50,000^{^}
^{^} Shipments figures based on certification alone.
