= Boys Will Be Boys (The Choirboys song) =

Single by The Choirboys

from the album Big Bad Noise
- B-side: "Last Night of My Life"
- Released: January 1988
- Recorded: Festival and Albert Studios, Sydney, Australia
- Length: 3:32
- Label: Mushroom Records
- Songwriters: Mark Gable, Brett Williams, Ian Hulme, Lindsay Tebbutt
- Producers: Brian McGee, Choirboys

The Choirboys singles chronology
| "Run to Paradise" (1987) | "Boys Will Be Boys" (1988) | "Struggle Town" (1988) |

"Boys Will Be Boys" is a song by Australian hard rock group The Choirboys, released in January 1988 as the third single from their second studio album Big Bad Noise. The song peaked at number 14 on the Australian Music Report.

== Track listing ==
Australian 7" vinyl (K432)

- Side A "Boys Will Be Boys" - 3:32
- Side B "Last Night of My Life" - 3:52

== Charts ==
Weekly chart performance of "Boys Will Be Boys"
| Chart (1988) | Peak position |
|---|---|
| Australia (Australian Music Report) | 14 |
| New Zealand (Recorded Music NZ) | 31 |
