= Skitzmetal =

SKITZMETAL

Studio album by Nick Skitz
- Released: 2006
- Label: Central Station

Nick Skitz chronology
Skitzmix 22 (2006)	SKITZMETAL (2006)	Skitzmix 23 (2006)

== Track listing ==
No.	Title	Original Artist	Length
1.	"Rock And Roll All Nite"	Kiss	2:47
2.	"Cum On Feel The Noize"	Quiet Riot	4:49
3.	"The Power"	H-Blockx	3:28
4.	"Figured You Out"	Nickelback	3:50
5.	"Cats In The Cradle"	Ugly Kid Joe	4:03
6.	"Cult Of Personality"	Living Colour	4:55
7.	"Ice Ice Baby"	Vanilla Ice	3:26
8.	"Cherry Pie"	Warrant	3:20
9.	"We're Not Gonna Take It"	Twisted Sister	3:36
10.	"Kryptonite"	3 Doors Down	3:56
11.	"Smooth Criminal"	Alien Ant Farm	3:31
12.	"You Really Got Me"	The Kinks	2:39
13.	"Better"	Screaming Jets	4:39
14.	"Wind Of Change"	Scorpions	5:12
15.	"The Final Countdown"	Europe	5:09
16.	"Unskinny Bop"	Poison	3:48
17.	"Run To Paradise"	Nick Skitz vs The Choirboys	4:37
18.	"(You Gotta) Fight For Your Right (To Party)"	Beastie Boys	3:26
19.	"Run To The Hills"	Iron Maiden	3:51
