= Scream of the Real =

Studio album by the Radiators
- Released: May 1983
- Studio: Studios 301, Sydney, Australia
- Genre: Rock
- Label: EMI Music

The Radiators chronology
Up for Grabs (1981)	Scream of the Real (1983)	Life's a Gamble (1984)

Singles from Scream of the Real
- 1. "No Tragedy" Released: April 1983; 2. "You" Released: July 1983; 3. "How Does it Feel" Released: 1983

Scream of the Real is the third studio album by Australian band the Radiators. The album was released in May 1983 and peaked at number 15 on the Australian Albums Chart; becoming the band's first top twenty album. The album was certified gold.

== Track listing ==
Side A
No.	Title	Writer(s)	Length
1.	"How Does It Feel"	Brian Nichol	4:31
2.	"Sitting in My Armchair"	Nichol	3:23
3.	"Gravitational Pull"	Brendan Callinan, Stephen Parker	3:08
4.	"Living on a Razor's Edge"	Nichol, Geoff Turner	3:48
5.	"You"	Nichol	3:40

Side B
No.	Title	Writer(s)	Length
1.	"No Tragedy"	Turner	3:59
2.	"Comin' Back for More"	Turner	2:50
3.	"Right Before My Eyes"	Nichols, Parker	3:09
4.	"Don't Call Us"	Turner	4:00
5.	"Getting Closer"	Chris Taglioli	3:07
6.	"Too Much Too Soon"	Turner	3:24

== Charts ==
Chart (1983)	Peak position
Australian Chart (Kent Music Report)	15

== Certifications ==
Region	Certification	Certified units/sales
Australia (ARIA)	Gold	20,000^{^}
^{^} Shipments figures based on certification alone.
