= Martin Cilia =

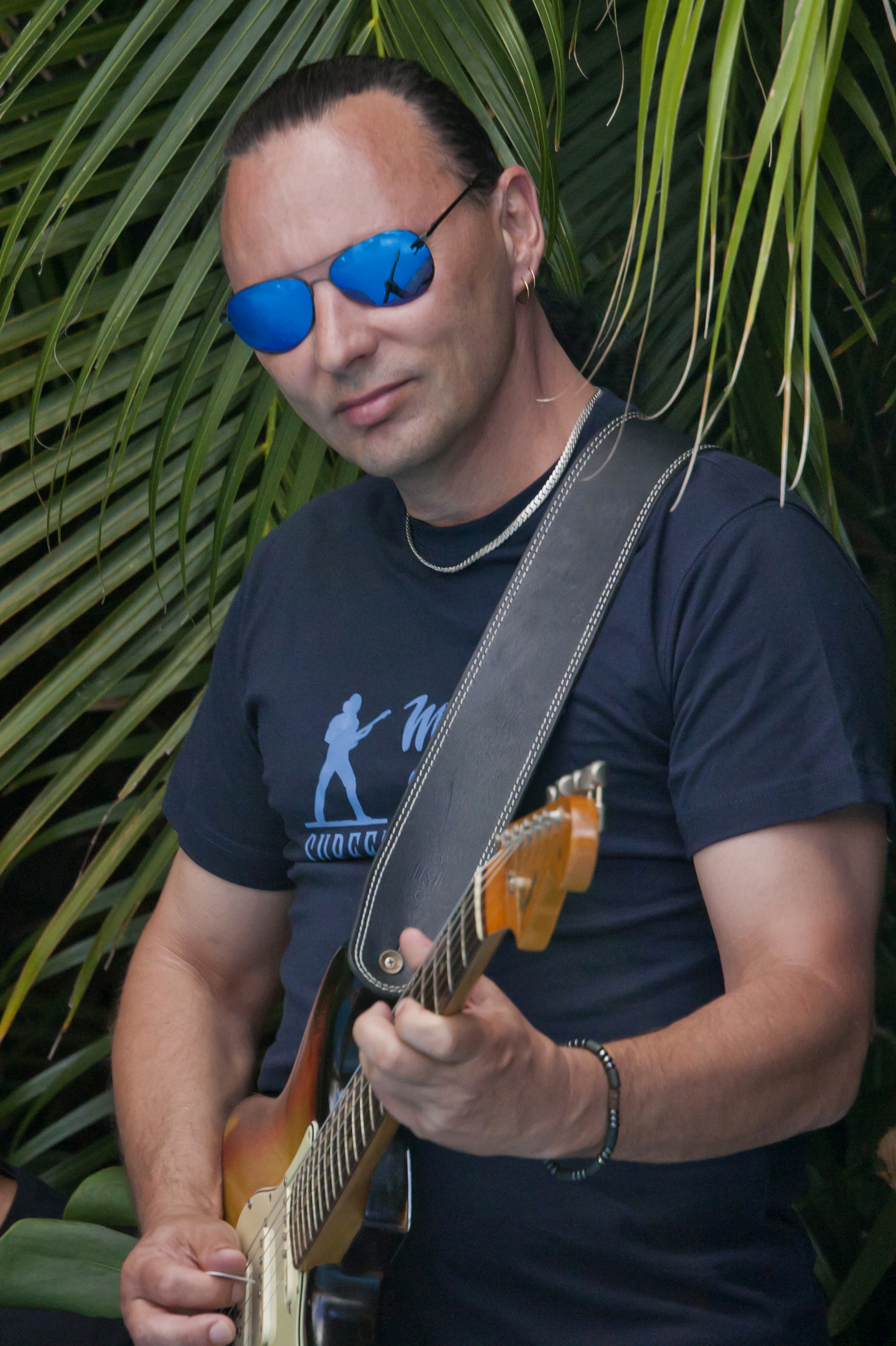
- Cilia playing surf guitar, 30 April 2013

Background information
- Born: December 1958 (age 67); Rochford, Essex, England
- Origin: Perth, Western Australia, Australia
- Genres: Rock, surf rock, pop, garage rock
- Occupations: Musician, songwriter
- Instruments: Vocals, guitar, bass
- Years active: 1974–present
- Website: MartinCillia.com

Martin Cilia (born December 1958) is an Australian musician. Cilia is best known for his songwriting skills, and his membership in The Atlantics, where he performs on the guitar. Cilia played his first gig in a school hall in Morley High in 1972 with fellow students. He remembered playing songs by The Shadows, The Monkees, The Beatles, and Cat Stevens.

== Start of career ==
At age 14, Cilia became a professional musician. He played in various bands in and around Perth before spending a year in London in 1979. In 1982, Cilia joined Invasion Force, where he met locals Alf Demasi and Lloyd Allanson. Together, they formed the Perth band The Flying Fonzarellis. The Flying Fonzarellis released several recordings and toured Sydney in 1984. The band released the studio album Having a Party, which peaked at number 58 in Australia in 1984. Singles "Honey Bee" and "Stay" peaked inside the Australia top 100 in 1985.

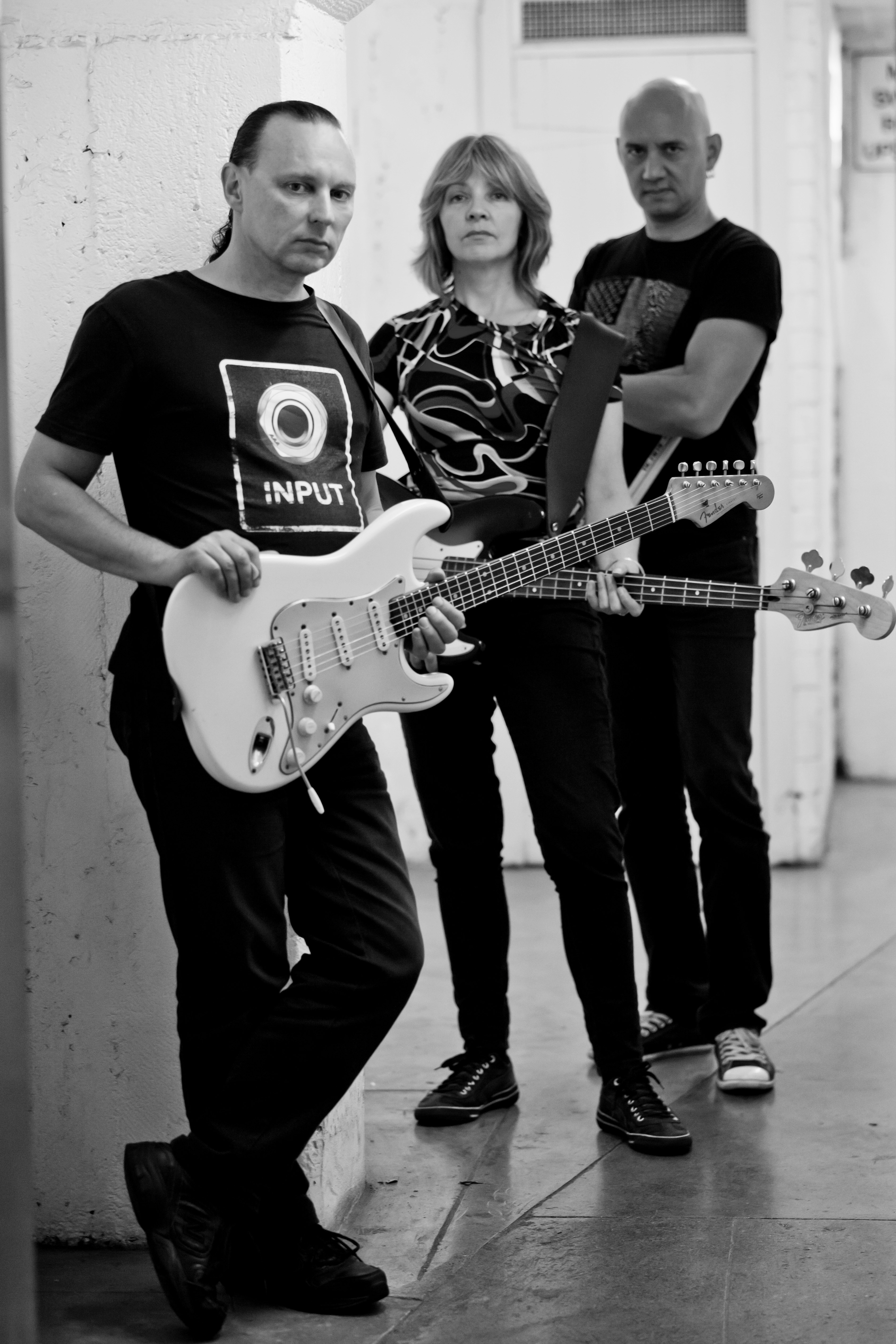
The Martin Cilia Band

After the Fonzarellis, he went on to play in Dave Warner's Sensational Sixties and then with Midget and the Farrellys who were extremely popular in Fremantle throughout the America's Cup. Already his passion for that stinging surf music guitar sound was obvious.

He went on to tour and record with Dave Warner's band, Dave Warner’s From The Suburbs. Cilia moved to Sydney in 1989. He played & recorded with The Brookes. He toured Western Australia in 1993 with the Big Land - Big Heart tour. That band contained Dobe Newton of the Bushwackers, Ernie Dingo, Dave Warner, Greg Macainish of Skyhooks, Paul Hitchins, (Sports) Dave Clarke and Cilla. They toured Vietnam with a similar concept in January 1994.

In 1998, he recorded some instrumental guitar songs. Bosco Bosanac, the bassist with the Australian surf group The Atlantics heard one of his demo tapes. The band is noted as the "Australia's own surf music maestros".

One Friday afternoon, Bosanac called Cilia. He said "You sound all right on the recordings but can you play live?" His band's guitarist had just called in sick. Cilia played at the gig and Bosco told the other members from The Atlantics about him, and Cilla has been an integral and permanent member of the band since. The Atlantics have gone on to record many of Cilia's songs, which have appeared on various Atlantics records, in feature film soundtracks, surf movies, and PlayStation games.

In August 2007, Cilia released his first solo album Revenge of the Surf Guitar. The album brought him first place internationally, both as an artist and songwriter in the Surf song category in 2009 at the Just Plain Folks Music Awards. Song WinnersHis next album The Odd One Out was released in 2009. Surfersaurus was released in 2011. The next solo album Going to Kaleponi was released on 5 April 2013. After that came Electric Christmas (2015), an EP called SleepWalk (2017) and Espresso Martino (2018). In 2019 he released Shadowman, a tribute to the British instrumental group, The Shadows, containing some covers and many original songs.

After The Atlantics retired from touring in 2013 (at the end of their European tour), he joined Aussie pop icons Mental As Anything. The band toured constantly from 2013 - 2019, but left the road due to the untimely death of lead singer Greedy Smith.

In 2021, Martin joined The Radiators and continues to tour with them.

Here Comes the Sun

In December 2024, Cilia released his 12th solo album, Here Comes the Sun, an instrumental tribute to The Beatles. The album features 13 classic Beatles songs reimagined with Cilia's signature surf rock guitar style, including tracks like "Here Comes the Sun," "Let It Be," and "While My Guitar Gently Weeps." It also includes an original composition titled "Abbey Road," showcasing the influence The Beatles have had on his music. The album was released under the Surfersaurus label and is available on platforms like Bandcamp and Apple Music.

== Equipment ==
Cilia is an avid collector of classic and unique electric guitars. Some of his most valuable guitars can be heard on Revenge of the Surf Guitar including an original candy apple Red 1963 Fender Stratocaster, a black 1963 Fender Jaguar, a 1957 Fender Precision Bass and a 1965 Fender Jazz Bass. Pieces from the collection are featured on his website with a story about each item, a new one is added each month - Guitar of the Month.

Inspired by a 2012 trip to Hawaii and California (the Hawaiians call it Kaleponi) and a chance meeting with surf guitarist Dick Dale, Going To Kaleponi has Martin and his classic guitar collection in full flight.

Martin was featured in a 6-page article in April 2020's Vintage Guitar magazine (Vol.43 No.6 April 2020). He talks about his influences, experience and shares photos of his vintage guitars.

== Discography ==
- Revenge of the Surf Guitar (2007)
- The Odd One Out (2009)
- Surfersaurus (2011)
- Going to Kaleponi (2013)
- Electric Christmas (2015)
- SleepWalk EP (2017)
- Espresso Martino (2018)
- Shadowman (2019)
- 6 Track EP (2022)
