= The Choirboys (band) =

Australian hard rock band

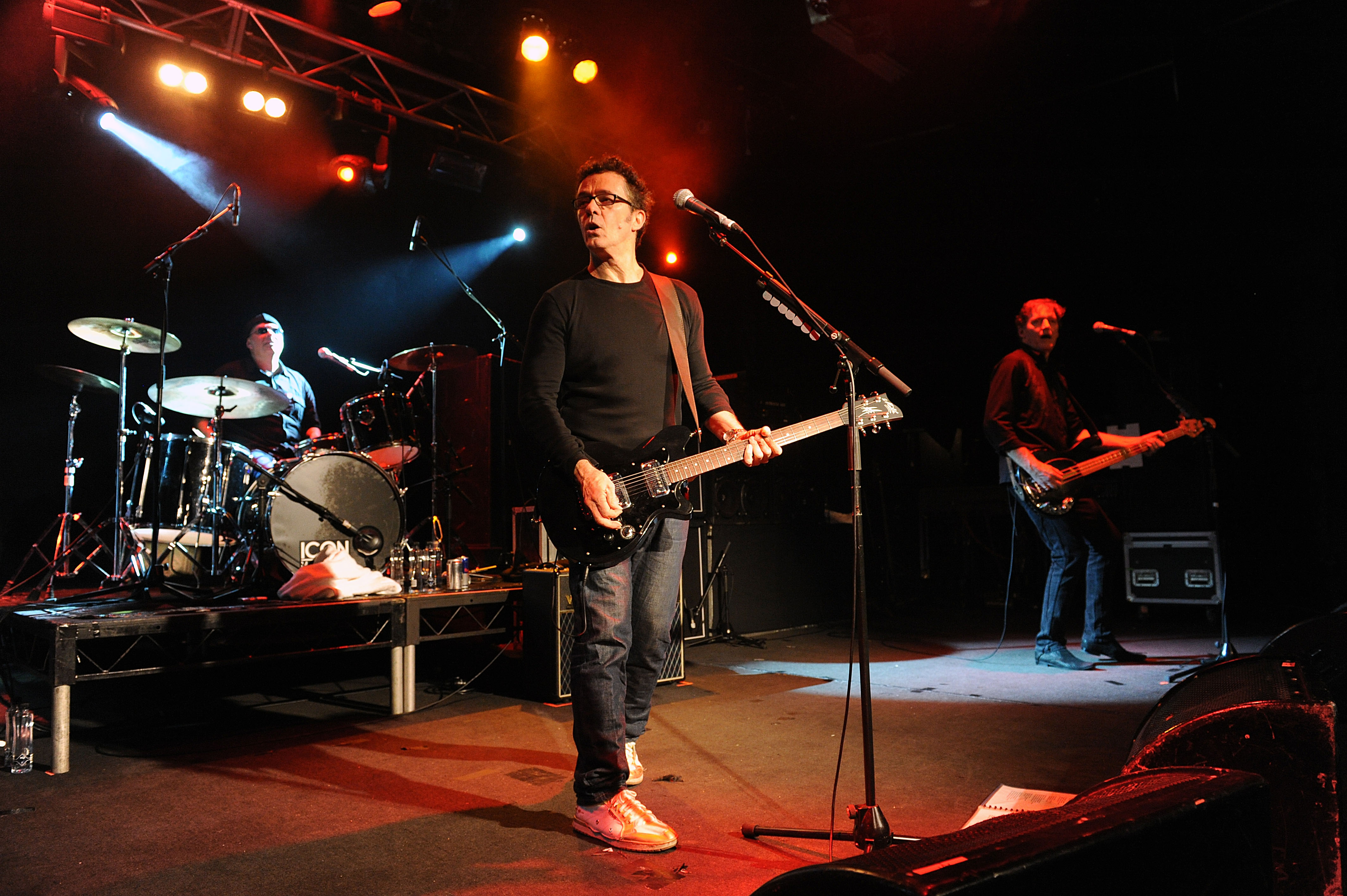
- The Choirboys performing in 2010

Background information
- Origin: Sydney, New South Wales, Australia
- Genres: Hard rock, pub rock
- Years active: 1979–present
- Labels: Albert/EMI, Mushroom/Festival, Warner Music, Camouflage/TWA
- Members: Mark Gable; Ian Hulme; Brett Williams
- Past members: Lindsay Tebbutt; Brad Carr; Bob Spencer; Brad Heaney; Steve Williams; Barton Price; Richard Lara; Tony Le Rhodes; Richard Coleman; Johnny Ghiselli; Rohan Cannon; Paul Wheeler; Mick O'Shea
- Website: choirboys.net

The Choirboys are an Australian hard rock and pub rock band from Sydney formed as Choirboys in 1979 with mainstays Mark Gable on lead vocals, Ian Hulme on bass guitar, Brad Carr on lead guitar and Lindsay Tebbutt on drums. In preparation for their second album, Big Bad Noise, in 1988, the band changed their name to The Choirboys. The band line-up saw many changes from 1983 to 2007, while releasing 8 studio albums. Their 1987 single "Run to Paradise" remains their biggest commercial success.

== Career ==
=== Early years ===
Choirboys formed in the Northern Beaches area of Sydney as a hard rock pub band in 1979. Original members were Brad Carr on lead guitar, Mark Gable on vocals, Ian Hulme on bass guitar and Lindsay Tebbutt on drums.

In 1983, after one of their demos was sent to Albert Productions record producer George Young (ex-The Easybeats, older brother of Angus and Malcolm Young of AC/DC) they signed to Albert Records. Jim Manzie produced their self-titled debut album, Choirboys, which was released in July. The first single, "Never Gonna Die" reached No. 30 on the Australian Kent Music Report Singles Chart. Australian TV and music personality Ian "Molly" Meldrum claimed the album was "destined to become an Aussie classic". They toured as support to The Angels and Rose Tattoo and then Cold Chisel invited Choirboys to support them on their Last Stand Tour. However in November, Gable's vocal cords had ruptured and they were unable to join that tour – they spent 1984 and 1985 in hiatus waiting for him to recover.

=== 1986–89: "Run to Paradise" and Big Bad Noise ===
Choirboys signed with Mushroom Records and released "Fireworks" in May 1986, they also opened for Deep Purple on their tour of Australia. Brad Carr left the group to be replaced on lead guitar by Brett Williams (ex-Brakes) as they supported Bon Jovi's tour in 1987. They recorded their second album, Big Bad Noise, with producers Peter Blyton (The Radiators, Machinations) and Brian McGee (The Rolling Stones, Cyndi Lauper). The next single "Run to Paradise" reached No. 3 in December 1987. Released in the United States, it appeared on the Billboard Hot 100 and peaked at No. 33 on the Mainstream Rock chart in 1989. Big Bad Noise peaked at No. 5 on the Kent Music Report Albums Chart in April 1988 and went double platinum. It was ranked No. 21 for the year in Australia. Other singles from the album included "Boys Will Be Boys" and "Struggle Town" reaching No. 14 and No. 34 respectively.

=== 1990s: Midnight Sun to Yo-Yo and Mushroom 25 ===
The Choirboys recorded Midnight Sun, in Los Angeles with producer Marc Tanner. The album didn't achieve the level of success of its predecessor – it peaked at No. 30. Late in the year they released a live album, Dead Drunk Live Hangovers, recorded at a Melbourne show.

Brad Heaney (ex-The Screaming Jets) replaced Tebbutt on drums and Steve Williams (Wa Wa Nee) replaced Brett Williams on guitar by 1993. Their compilation album Decade 1983–1993 (1993) was followed by Dancing on the Grave of Rock n' Roll (1994), with Barton Price (Models) on drums, which was produced by Gable and Hulme.

The band recorded its next album, Yo-Yo, in Germany during 1996, with Blyton and Choirboys producing and Richard Lara (The Screaming Jets) replacing Brett Williams on guitar. The band supported Cheap Trick on their Australian tour in the same year with Tony Le Rhodes on drums.

On 14 November 1998, The Choirboys performed at the prestigious Mushroom 25 concert in front of 75,000 people at the MCG, Melbourne. They were alongside other well-known acts, including Jimmy Barnes, The Machinations, Nick Barker, The Sports and INXS, to name a few.

=== 2000–present ===
The Choirboys recorded the Evolver album in 2002 and 2003 in between going on an extensive tour of Australia and New Zealand. Richard Coleman was the current drummer until 2003. Then former Icehouse drummer Paul Wheeler joined the band. The Evolver album was released in 2004 but due to low promotion for the album, it peaked at 174 in the Australian charts. The band returned to the Australian singles charts in Australia in July when dance producer Nick Skitz asked Gable to sing "Run to Paradise" on a dance reworking. The song, billed as "Nick Skitz vs. Choirboys", debuted in the top 20 of the Australian singles charts.

In 2006, The Choirboys performed "Run To Paradise" on the Grand Final edition of The AFL Footy Show and released Big Bad and Acoustic with re-recorded versions of their earlier work. In 2007 they resurfaced to bring out their next studio album, So Easy, which contained cover versions of The Easybeats' songs. Gable said, "We thought it a worthwhile exercise to explore them in a more modern light. We could redo things with a greater technical capacity [...] we could put in backgrounds that two-track recording wouldn't allow. With Pretty Girl, for example, we spent quite a bit of time, adding about 80 backing vocals around the lead".

Gable hosted a radio show, Vega Sunday Session, on Vega 95.3 FM Sydney and Melbourne. The show featured local and international artists talking about their lives and their music. On 25 October, The Choirboys performed "Run to Paradise" at the Gold Coast SuperGP (formerly Indy Carnival). They released a second compilation, Never Gonna Die – The Very Best of Choirboys 30th Anniversary (2009), and followed with a national tour into 2010. Gable as of 2012 hosts his own radio show The Awesome Eighties on 107.7 2GO (2GGO) FM Central Coast. The show which is aired 5 days a week consists of interviews and insight into the music and the artists of the 1980s.

In 2018, The Choirboys released the instrumental album, 1965, Life's a Beach.

In 2019, the Choirboys released a series of cover EPs, titled 6 Pack of the Hits.

In 2021, The Choirboys released the singles "Feels Good", "Sorry" and "Rendezvous" followed by Feels Good. Feels Good is a compilation of live streams songs, released on vinyl on 29 October 2021.

On 17 December 2021 the band announced through their social media pages that drummer Lindsay Tebbutt had died from mesothelioma.

== Members ==
Current members

- Mark Gable – lead vocals (1979–present), rhythm guitar (1979–1993, 1999–2002, 2003–2007, 2007–present), lead guitar (1993–2010)
- Ian Hulme – bass, backing vocals (1979–present)
- Brett Williams – lead guitar, backing vocals (1987–1992, 2010–present)

Former members

- Lindsay Tebbutt – drums, backing vocals (1979–1992, 2010–2021; died 2021)
- Brad Carr – lead guitar (1979–1987)
- Bob Spencer – lead guitar (1992–2004)
- Brad Heaney – drums (1993–1994)
- Steve Williams – rhythm guitar (1993–1995)
- Barton Price – drums (1994–1996)
- Richard Lara – guitar (1995–1999)
- Tony Le Rhodes – drums (1996–1997)
- Richard Coleman – drums, backing vocals (1997–2003)
- Johnny Ghiselli – rhythm guitar (2002–2003)
- Rohan Cannon – rhythm guitar (2007)
- Paul Wheeler – drums, backing vocals (2003–2009)
- Mick O'Shea – drums, backing vocals (2009–2010)

== Discography ==
=== Studio albums ===
List of studio albums, with selected chart positions
Title	Album details	Peak chart positions
Title	Album details	AUS
Choirboys	Released: July 1983; Format: LP, CS; Label: Albert Productions (APLP – 060)	26
Big Bad Noise	Released: March 1988; Format: CD, LP, CS; Label: Mushroom (RML 53258)	5
Midnight Sun	Released: 26 May 1991; Format: CD, LP, CS; Label: Mushroom (TVL 93324)	30
Dancing on the Grave of Rock n' Roll	Released: 1994; Format: CD; Label: Ravenswood Records (R V 1009)	-
Yo-Yo	Released: September 1996; Format: CD; Label: Shock (BOYS02)	179
Evolver	Released: May 2004; Format: CD; Label: Shock (BOYS01)	-
Big Bad and Acoustic	Released: 2006; Format: CD; Label: Liberation Blue (BLUE087.2)	-
So Easy	Released: 2007; Format: CD; Label: Big Bad Music Production	-
1965, Life's a Beach	Released: 1 August 2018; Format: CD, digital; Label: Choirboys	-

=== Live albums ===
List of live albums
Title	Album details
Dead Drunk Live Hangovers	Released: 1991 (USA only); Label: Big Bad Music; Format: CD; Note: Limited edition
Pub Rock Live	Released: October 2017; Label: Choirboys; Format: digital; Note: Live at Boondall

=== Compilation albums ===
List of compilation albums, with selected chart positions
Title	Album details	Peak chart positions
Title	Album details	AUS
Decade 1983-1993	Released: November 1993; Label: Mushroom (D24528); Format: CD, CS	117
Never Gonna Die – The Very Best of Choirboys 30th Anniversary	Released: October 2009; Warner Music Australia (5186556422); Format: CD, digital	-
This Is Paradise: Greatest Hits	Released: November 2019; Warner Music Australia (5419705635); Format: LP	-
Feels Good	Released: November 2021; Big Bad Music (BigBadMusic02); Format: LP	-

=== Extended plays ===
List of EPs, with selected details
Title	Details
6 Pack of Creedence Clearwater Revival	Released: July 2019; Format: digital; Label: Choirboys
6 Pack of Tom	Released: October 2019; Format: digital; Label: Choirboys
6 Pack of Bruce Springsteen	Released: December 2019; Format: digital; Label: Choirboys

=== Singles ===
Year	Title	Peak chart positions				Album
Year	Title	AUS	NZ	USA (Hot 100)	USA (Main)	Album
1983	"Never Gonna Die"	30	—	—	—	Choirboys
1983	"Talk Big"	—	—	—	—	Choirboys
1983	"Boys in the Band"	—	—	—	—	Choirboys
1986	"Fireworks"	60	—	—	—	Big Bad Noise
1987	"Run to Paradise"	3	13	80	33	Big Bad Noise
1988	"Boys Will Be Boys"	14	31	—	—	Big Bad Noise
1988	"Struggle Town"	28	—	—	—	Big Bad Noise
1989	"Empire"	65	—	—	—	non-album single
1991	"Rendezvous"	40	—	—	—	Midnight Sun
1991	"Place with No Love"	110	—	—	—	Midnight Sun
1993	"All Night" / "Run to Paradise"	117	—	—	—	Decade 1983-1993
1994	"Hard Heart"	—	—	—	—	Dancin on the Grave of Rock n' Roll
1995	"Drops Like a Stone"	—	—	—	—	Dancin on the Grave of Rock n' Roll
1996	"Solo"	—	—	—	—	Yo-Yo
2004	"Dream On (All You Need Is Love)"	—	—	—	—	Evolver
2004	"Run to Paradise" (by Nick Skitz vs Choirboys)	16	—	—	—	non-album single
2021	"Home Free"	—	—	—	—	Feels Good
2021	"Sorry"	—	—	—	—	Feels Good
2021	"Rendezvous"	—	—	—	—	Feels Good
2023	"Give Me All the Lovin' That You Got"	—	—	—	—	Non-album single
2025	"Have you ever seen the Rain" (featuring Jay Parrino)"	—	—	—	—	Non-album single
"—" denotes a recording that did not chart or was not released in that territory.
