= Nasty Habits in Nice Children =

Studio album by the Radiators
- Released: March 1987
- Recorded: November–December 1986
- Studio: Glebe, Rhinoceros; Sydney, Australia
- Genre: Rock music
- Label: Mercury
- Producer: Peter Blyton, Chris Pine, The Radiators

The Radiators chronology
Life's a Gamble (1984)	Nasty Habits in Nice Children (1987)	Gimme .... Live (1988)

Singles from Nasty Habits in Nice Children
- 1. "One Touch" Released: June 1986; 2. "Bring on the Crazy" Released: November 1986; 3. "Dreaming" Released: March 1987; 4. "Love Ain't Love" Released: June 1987

Nasty Habits in Nice Children is the fifth studio album by Australian band the Radiators. The album was released in March 1987 and peaked at number 68 on the Australian Albums Chart.

== Track listing ==
Side A
No.	Title	Writer(s)	Length
1.	"One Touch"	Brian Nichol	4:03
2.	"Dreaming"	Brendan Callinan	4:05
3.	"Art of Love"	Geoff Turner	4:05
4.	"Bring on the Crazy"	Nichol	4:17
5.	"Love Ain't Love"	Nichol	3:53

Side B
No.	Title	Writer(s)	Length
1.	"Promise Of Love"	Turner	3:31
2.	"Start All Over Again"	Nichol, Stephen Parker	3:09
3.	"Giving Up On Love"	Turner	4:03
4.	"New Horizons"	Parker	3:38
5.	"Now That I've Found You"	Callinan, Turner	5:06

== Charts ==
Chart (1987)	Position
Australian Chart (Kent Music Report)	68
