= Gimme .... Live =

Live album by The Radiators
- Released: March 1988
- Genre: Rock music
- Label: Mercury Records

The Radiators chronology
Nasty Habits in Nice Children (1987)	Gimme .... Live (1988)	Hard Core (1991)

Singles from Gimme .... Live
- 1. "Summer Holiday" Released: April 1988

Gimme .... Live is the first live album by Australian band The Radiators. The album was released in March 1988 and peaked at number 50 on the Australian Albums Chart.

== Track listing ==
Side A
No.	Title	Writer(s)	Length
1.	"Summer Holiday"	Brian Nichol
2.	"One Touch"	Nichol
3.	"Room Full Of Diamonds"	Nichol
4.	"Hit and Run"	Nichol, Geoff Turner
5.	"Lonely"	Turner
6.	"Gimme Head"	Turner

Side B
No.	Title	Writer(s)	Length
1.	"No Tragedy"	Turner
2.	"Bring on the Crazy"	Nichol
3.	"Life's a Gamble"	Turner
4.	"17 (I Wish I Was)"	Nichol
5.	"Coming Home"	Turner

== Charts ==
Chart (1988)	Position
Australian Chart (Kent Music Report)	50
