= Big Bad Noise =

Studio album by The Choirboys
- Released: February 5, 1988
- Recorded: 1986–1987
- Studio: EMI Studios 301, Rhinoceros Studios, Festival Studios, Glebe Studios, Albert Studios
- Genre: Hard rock, pub rock
- Length: 50:26
- Label: Mushroom
- Producer: Peter Blyton, Brian McGee, The Choirboys

The Choirboys chronology
Choirboys (1983)	Big Bad Noise (1988)	Midnight Sun (1991)

Singles from Big Bad Noise
- 1. "Fireworks" Released: May 1986; 2. "Run to Paradise" Released: August 1987; 3. "Boys Will Be Boys" Released: January 1988; 4. "Struggle Town" Released: May 1988

Big Bad Noise is the second studio album by Australian rock band The Choirboys, released in February 1988. This album was produced by Peter Blyton (The Radiators, Machinations), Brian McGee (The Rolling Stones, Cyndi Lauper) and The Choirboys. The album peaked at No. 5 on the Kent Music Report Albums Chart, it was certified double platinum and ranked No. 21 for 1988 in Australia.

It featured their number 3 Australian hit and most popular song "Run to Paradise". Other singles from the album included "Boys Will Be Boys" and "Struggle Town" reaching No. 14 and No. 34 respectively.

== Track listing ==
1. "Run to Paradise"
2. "Struggle Town"
3. "Boys Will Be Boys"
4. "Brave New World"
5. "Guilty"
6. "Like Fire"
7. "Big Bad Noise"
8. "Fireworks"
9. "Gasoline"
10. "One Hot Day"
11. "Last Night of My Life"
12. "Struck by Lightning"
13. "James Dale"

== Charts ==
=== Weekly charts ===
Chart performance for Big Bad Noise
Chart (1988)	Peak position
Australian Albums (Australian Music Report)	5

=== Year-end charts ===
Chart performance for Big Bad Noise
Chart (1988)	Position
Australia (ARIA)	21
