= The Atlantics =

Australian surf rock band

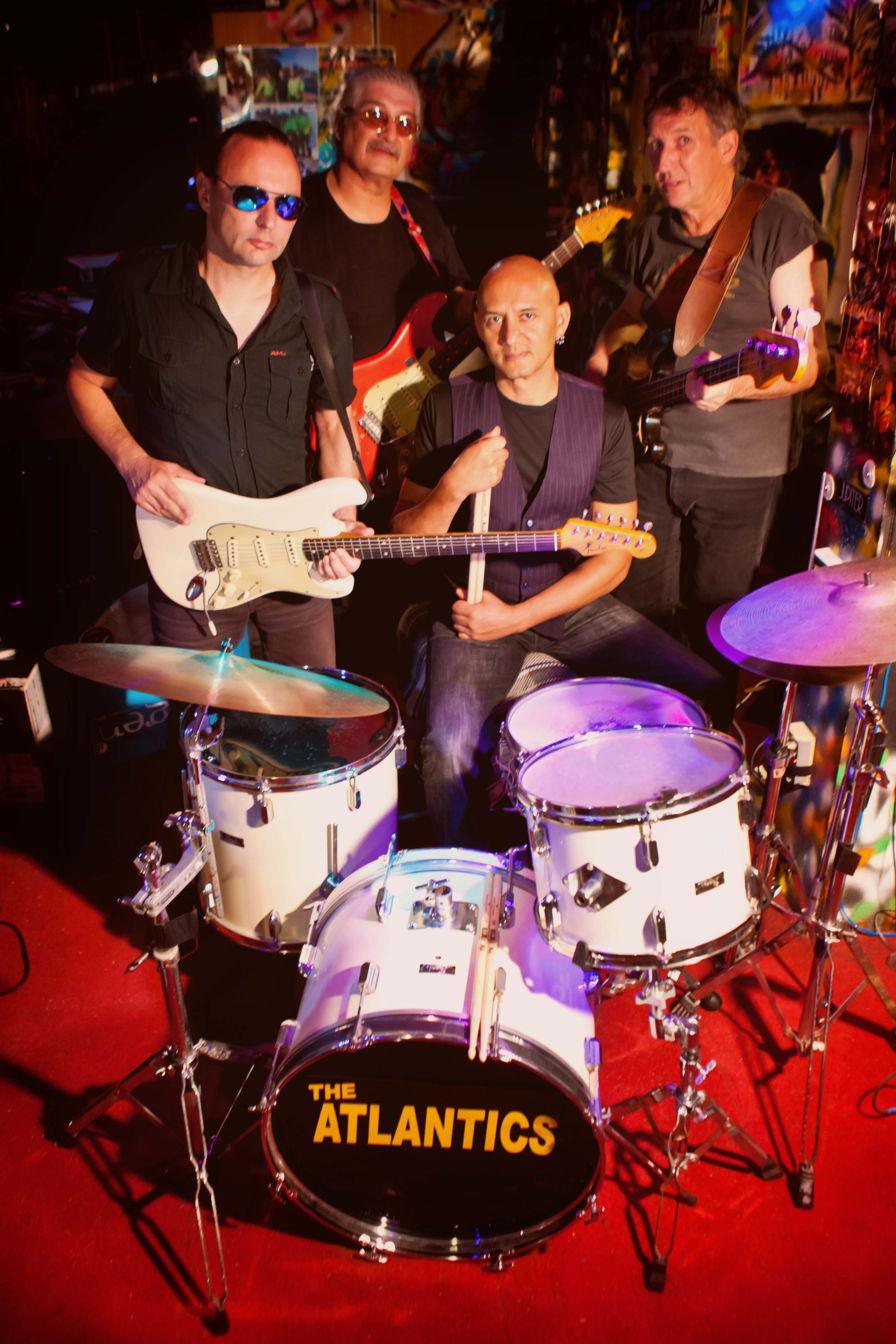
- The Atlantics in 2013

Background information
- Origin: Sydney, New South Wales, Australia
- Genres: Surf; garage rock; instrumental rock; protopunk
- Years active: 1961–present
- Label: CBS Records
- Members: Jim Skiathitis; Bosco Bosanac; Martin Cilia; Jacob Cook
- Past members: Peter Hood; Theo Penglis; Johnny Rebb; Eddie Matzenik; Brian Burns; Michael Smith; Paul Greene
- Website: The Atlantics Web Site

The Atlantics are an Australian surf band founded in 1961. Initially, the band line-up consisted of drummer Peter Hood, bassist Bosco Bosanac, Theo Penglis on lead and rhythm guitar, and guitarist Eddy Matzenik. Matzenik was replaced by Jim Skaithitis while the band was still in its earliest stages, long before the band recorded or released albums. The band's claim to fame was as Australia's most successful of the genre. Most well known for their classic hit, "Bombora", their later recordings such as "Come On" are examples of 1960s garage rock. They were the first Australian rock band to write their own hits. In 2000 the group reformed with three of the original members, and continue to release new material and perform in concert. In 2013 the group celebrated the 50th Anniversary of their first album, Bombora and the eponymous single that was their first to chart. A European tour was organised to mark the occasion.

'Bombora' was added to the National Film and Sound Archive's Sounds of Australia registry in 2013.

Note: There was a rock band in the Boston, Massachusetts area also called the Atlantics in the mid-1970s and early 1980s; songs of theirs included "Weekend", "When You're Young", and "Lonelyhearts". They had an album on ABC Records called Big City Rock.

== History ==
Formed in the southern beachside suburbs of Sydney, Australia in 1961, the group began performing locally, and soon gained a following. Contrary to the accepted surfing connotations of their name they actually took their name from a local brand of petrol, Atlantic. In early 1962 they appeared on a local television talent show New Faces, where they were voted "Most Promising Group of 1962." They signed a deal with booking agent Joan King, who convinced the members to quit their day jobs and produce a demo, which she shopped to a variety of record labels. After several rejections, they were signed to CBS Records in 1963. The A&R representative for CBS, Sven Libaek, was especially impressed by the group's original compositions. Most Australian instrumental rock bands at the time merely aped and covered material from The Shadows or, to a lesser extent, The Ventures. The Atlantics had the advantage of having twin lead guitarists, both highly proficient on solo work and both capable of pushing the band along with a driving rhythm. It was this, together with the band members' European cultural influences (largely Greek with some Yugoslav and Hungarian - all members came to Australia as child migrants) that gave their music that passionate edge over other local bands of their day.

In February 1963, CBS released the first single, "Moon Man" b/w "Dark Eyes". "Moon Man" was an original song written by Peter Hood, and "Dark Eyes" was a traditional tune reinterpreted by the band. While the single was not a hit, it did gain enough attention for CBS to agree to continue to support the group.

=== Riding the surf music wave ===
By this time the surfing music craze had reached Australia's shores and a host of local bands such as The Statesmen, Jimmy D & the Starlighters (a.k.a. Jimmy D & the Jaguars), The Midnighters, The Telstars, Dave Bridge Trio, The Joy Boys and The Denvermen were all releasing surfing titled instrumental tracks, and in particular, The Denvermen's evocative ballad "Surfside", which had topped Australia's charts in February 1963.

In July 1963, The Atlantics released the single that would become their biggest hit, most well-known song and one which remains a classic of its genre to this day. "Bombora" was written by Hood and Skiathitis, and was named after an Aboriginal term for large waves breaking over submerged rock shelves. The B-side was the old traditional English song "Greensleeves". By September 1963, "Bombora" had climbed the Australian charts to reach No 1. It was released in Japan, Italy, Netherlands, UK and New Zealand and in South America. It was nominated as record of the week by US Cashbox magazine and reached No 2 on the Italian charts (where there was even a vocal version released). As well the song was covered by a number of overseas bands. This overseas success made The Atlantics Australia's first internationally recognised rock act. October 1963 saw the release of their first LP album, Bombora. They released three more albums from 1963 to 1965. On stage the band maintained their reputation at concerts and beachside surf clubs with an exciting, pounding sound combined with a stage act that included them all playing their guitars behind their heads and Penglis and Skiathitis on opposite sides of the stage swapping lead lines with one another.

In November 1963, they released the follow-up, another similar thundering surf instrumental, "The Crusher" which, while not quite as successful as "Bombora", still made a respectable dent in the Australian charts.

Their fourth single, "War of the Worlds" however was a total break with the surf sound. Released in March 1964, it was unlike any other of their tracks, or indeed any other instrumentals of the day. A bold and ambitious attempt at a mini Sci-Fi space opera, it had a dramatic build-up intro, tempo changes and dynamic changes. It was way ahead of its time. It featured a battle in space using echo and guitar effects, the like of which would not be heard until Hendrix came along some years later. Disappointingly for the band, many DJ's refused to play it and it failed to make most charts.

By this time The Beatles and the Merseybeat sound had arrived and instrumentals were becoming rather passé. The Atlantics continued to release a number of instrumental singles with titles such as "Rumble and Run" and "Giant" until July 1965. However, none of these achieved any commercial success, and did not chart. Their record contract with CBS ended. During 1965 they undertook a far-Eastern tour including Japan.

=== New image and style ===
In 1965, the band members reinvented themselves. They set up their own production company JRA productions. They exchanged their suits and thin ties for casual shirts, T-shirts and jeans and grew their hair long, guitarist Theo Penglis switched to keyboards and they added a vocalist, Johnny Rebb. Rebb had been a rock star in Australia in his own right in the late 1950s. Indeed, he had at one time been known as the "Gentleman of Rock". With Johnny on vocals they proceeded to release a number of tough sounding singles starting with a hard rockin' revival of Little Richard's "The Girl Can't Help It" and Bo Diddley's, R 'n B, "You Can't Judge A Book By Its Cover". They recorded songs with a variety of styles between 1965 and 1970 including a cover of The Beau Brummels' top 40 hit "You Tell Me Why" with 12 string guitar hook & harmonies, and an instrumental, "Take A Trip," under the pseudonym band name as The Gift of Love. However they only succeeded chart-wise with a version of Screaming Jay Hawkins "I Put A Spell on You", which reached No. 29 on the Sydney chart in 1966. In 1967 they put out the song that is now widely regarded as a classic punk/garage track, Peter Hood's "Come On". During this time, Rebb continued to release a number of singles under his own name with The Atlantics backing him. They also provided backing on a string of singles for Russ Kruger, Rebb's brother, and female singer Kelly Green. It was during this time that The Atlantics started their own independent label, Ramrod. They were one of the first Australian bands to set up their own independent label. From September 1967 all their recordings and all those for the above artists were released on their Ramrod label. As well they put out recordings by other bands such as The Motivation.

=== More changes after 1970 ===
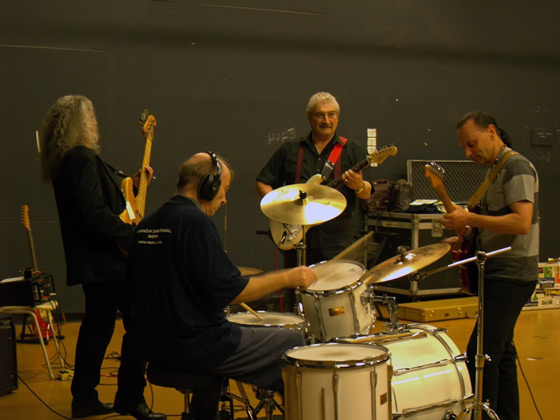
The Atlantics in 2007.

Around 1970 the "classic" lineup ceased to regularly perform live. They started their own recording studio, Atlantic studio (no connection with the U.S. company Atlantic Records), in the Sydney suburb of Earlwood. Run by Peter Hood, this studio was to operate continuously right through into the 1990s, recording a wide variety of music from advertising jingles to country music to heavy metal bands and at one point even produced a single there for visiting Hollywood actress, Brooke Shields. Bosco Bosanac went into country music and switched to pedal steel guitar. He formed a band with Anglo-American country singer Mike Fox and produced two albums for him. Fox won a Golden Guitar as the best new talent award for 1978 at Australia's annual prestigious Tamworth Country Music Festival for his song "If Nobody Loves You", which came from his first album. Theo Penglis played lead guitar and piano on this track. Bosco then went to form country rock band Shotgun. Theo Penglis is currently playing piano with Fifties Rock and Roll Band "Rave On". Robert "Bob" Haanstra also played lead guitar in both Mike Fox & The Tennessee Ramblers and Shotgun. Bob now resides in southern NSW and teaches guitar, whilst Bosco Bosanac now performs around Australia in a Johnny Cash Review.

=== The Flight of the Surf Guitar ===
Over the years The Atlantics have re-emerged sporadically. In 1986–1988, Skiathitis, Hood, and Bosanac went on tour with replacement guitarist Brian Burns and drummer Paul Greene. In 1999 the three reformed on a more permanent basis with guitarist Martin Cilia. They have since released three albums, beginning with The Flight of the Surf Guitar. They are in the forefront of a new interest in the surf rock music instrumental genre. They have done a number of tours including appearing on Australia's Long Way to the Top 1950s and 1960s rock revival shows, ABC-TV show Studio 22, and "Bombora" was used in the closing ceremony at the 2000 Summer Olympics in Sydney. They continue to perform live. On 2 December 2006 they appeared live, playing "Bombora" on the ABC Television show Delightful Rain, a celebration of four decades of Australian surf rock music. Bosanac had left the band in May that year, just weeks before The Atlantics were invited by Bombora Creative MD David Minear to be a part of the Delightful Rain project, with Michael Smith, the former bass player for Adelaide band Scandal and writer and editor for Drum Media magazine, replacing him. In November 2009, Bombora Creative released a DVD, The Atlantics Live at Freshwater, of an impromptu performance the band did at the end of their recording sessions for Delightful Rain.

Still Making Waves

In 2022 the remaining members of the band (Jim, Martin & Bosco) returned to the studio to create an album of all new songs called Still Making Waves. Jacob Cook was enlisted on drums. A previously recorded drum track by original drummer Peter Hood was used for the song Stranger on Mykonos making it his final release. The album was dedicated to Peter. The album was released on Australia Day in January 2023 - 60 years after their first album.

In January 2023 The Atlantics were inducted into the Parkes Wall of Fame during the annual Elvis Festival.

== Members ==
=== Current ===
- Jim Skiathitis - Guitar (1961-1970, 1986-1988, 1999–present)
- Bosco Bosanac - Bass (1961-1970, 1986-1988, 1999-2006, 2022–present)
- Martin Cilia - Guitar (1999–present)
- Jacob Cook - Drums (2022–present)

=== Former ===
- Peter Hood - Drums (1961-1970, 1986-1988, 1999-2013; died 2021)
- Eddie Matzenik - Guitar (1961)
- Theo Penglis - Guitar (1961-1970)
- Johnny Rebb - Vocals (1965-1970; died 2014)
- Brian Burns - Guitar (1986-1988)
- Paul Greene - Drums (1986-1988)
- Michael Smith - Bass (2006-2013)

== Discography ==
=== Albums ===
- Now It's Stompin' Time (CBS, 1963)
- Bombora (CBS, 1963)
- The Explosive Sound Of The Atlantics (CBS, 1964)
- Flight Of The Surf Guitar (Atlantics Music, 1999)
- The Next Generation (Atlantics Music, 2001)
- Point Zero (Atlantics Music, 2003)
- Still Making Waves (Atlantics Music, 2023)

=== Compilations ===
- The Complete CBS Recordings (Canetoad Records, 1994)
- The Legendary JRA/Ramrod Sessions (Canetoad Records, 1997)
- The Atlantics....The Best Of (Atlantics Music, 2005)
- Point Zero Backing Tracks (Atlantics Music, 2010)
- Collectibles (Atlantics Music, 2013)

== Notes ==
- Collected Stories on Australian Rock 'n Roll - Compiled by David Maclean - CaneToad Publications, Sydney - 1991
- The Encyclopedia of Australian Rock and Pop - Ian McFarlane - Allen & Unwin, Sydney - 1999 - ISBN 1-86508-072-1
- Cover Liner Notes - The Atlantics with Johnny Rebb on Vocals - The legendary JRA/Ramrod sessions CD - Canetoad Records CTCD-003
- The Tamworth Country Music Festival - Monika Allen - Horwitz Grahame Pty Ltd, Sydney - 1988
- Cover Liner Notes - Mike Fox LP - Country Boys Memories - Bunyip Records BLS 309 1978
- An Australian Rock Discography 1960-1989 - Chris Spencer - Moonlight Publishers - 1990 - ISBN 0-7316-8343-9
