= Up for Grabs (album) =

Studio album by The Radiators
- Released: September 1981
- Recorded: 1981
- Label: Powderworks Records

The Radiators chronology
You Have the Right to Remain Silent (1981)	Up for Grabs (1981)	Scream of the Real (1983)

Singles from Up for Grabs
- 1. "Room Full of Diamonds" Released: June 1981; 2. "Up for Grabs" Released: November 1981; 3. "Nothings Changed" Released: February 1982

Up for Grabs is the second studio album by Australian band The Radiators. The album was 'Produced by Leo Productions' with the group's Fess Parker as 'Production Assistant'; it was engineered by Spencer Lee and David Hemming at Leo Recorders, Sydney. It was released in September 1981 and peaked at number 29 on the Australian Albums Chart and was certified gold.

Susan Molloy, writing in the Sydney Morning Herald, opined that the album was ‘quite appealing in the way they have restrained themselves from going overboard with the heavy metal sound. Instead, this album has some interesting experimental moments (from Kraftwerk?) and some cutesy songs… Up for Grabs is one of the better offerings from a veritable flood of local recordings.'

== Track listing ==
Side A
No.	Title	Writer(s)	Length
1.	"Up For Grabs"	Brian Nichol, Chris Tagg, Geoff Turner
2.	"Room Full of Diamonds"	Nichol
3.	"Nothings Changed"	Nichol
4.	"It Wasn't Me"	Nichol
5.	"Restless"	Turner

Side B
No.	Title	Writer(s)	Length
1.	"Something Wrong"	Turner
2.	"Automatic"	Turner
3.	"Bustin Out"	Tagg, Stephen Parker
4.	"I Go to Pieces"	Turner
5.	"Sex"	Turner
6.	"Out of It"	Turner

== Charts ==
Chart (1981/82)	Peak position
Australian Chart (Kent Music Report)	29

== Certifications ==
Region	Certification	Certified units/sales
Australia (ARIA)	Gold	20,000^{^}
^{^} Shipments figures based on certification alone.
