= Mark Gable =

Australian musician

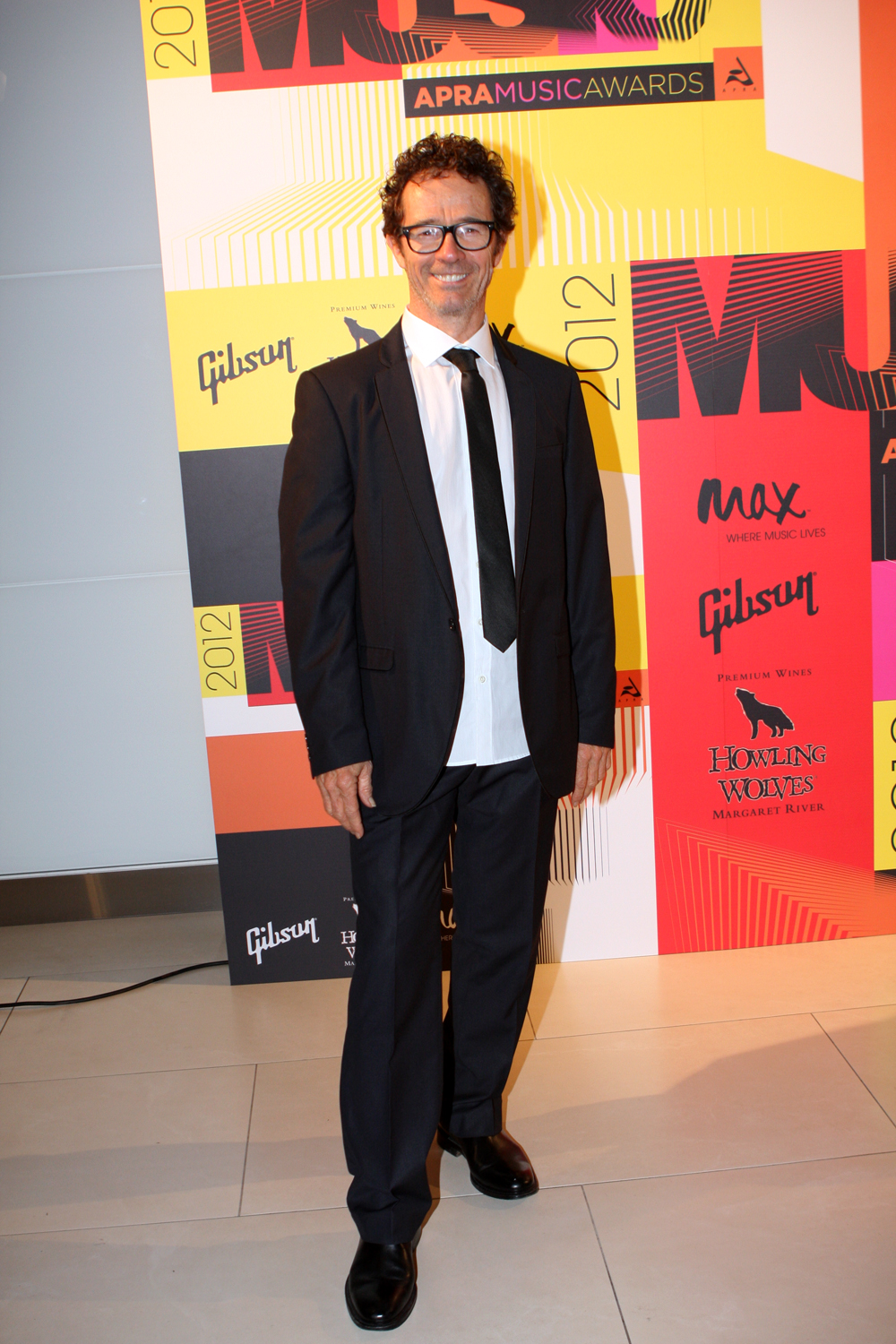
- Gable at the APRA Awards in 2012

Background information
- Born: Mark Dixon Kitchen; 8 September 1950 (age 76); Captains Flat, New South Wales, Australia
- Origin: Northern Beaches, New South Wales, Australia
- Genres: Pub rock, hard rock, new wave
- Occupations: Singer-songwriter; guitarist; music producer; radio Presenter; photographer
- Instruments: vocals, guitar, keyboards, drums, bass
- Years active: 1968–present
- Labels: Albert Productions; Mushroom; Warner Music; WTG Records
- Website: choirboys.net markgable.com.au

Mark Dixon Kitchen (born 8 September 1950), known professionally as Mark Gable, is an Australian musician who serves as the frontman and a founding member of the rock band The Choirboys. The band was formed in Sydney in 1979.

== Early life ==
Gable was born in Captains Flat, New South Wales.

== Radio ==
Starting in 2012, Gable hosted The Awesome Eighties on 107.7 2GO in The New South Wales Central Coast, with assistance from Mike Duncan. From 2008 to 2009, he hosted and co-produced a weekly series for smoothfm, The Sunday Session where he interviewed many international and local artists. The show was aired on a Sunday afternoon in Sydney and Melbourne.

== Personal life ==
In 2008, Gable become an ambassador for Beyond Blue.

Gable is married to country singer-songwriter Melinda Schneider, they were married on 10 September 2022 on Killcare Beach, NSW after 14 years together. They had their first child Sullivan James Gable in August 2012. Gable has five children from a previous relationship.

== Discography ==
=== The Choirboys Studio albums ===
- Choirboys (1983)
- Big Bad Noise (1988)
- Midnight Sun (1991)
- Dancing on the Grave of Rock n' Roll (1994)
- Yo-Yo (1996)
- Evolver (2004)
- Big Bad and Acoustic (2006)
- So Easy (2007)

=== Quartets ===
"Handle with Care" (with Damien Leith, Bobby Flynn, and Ilan Kidron)

== Television ==
Mark Gable appeared as one of "The 100" judges on All Together Now, an Australian reality television music competition on the Seven network.
