= Give Me the Love =

- Regular and digital edition cover

Single by AOA featuring Takanori Nishikawa

from the album Runway
- B-side: "Still Falls the Rain"; "Girl's Heart"
- Released: April 20, 2016
- Genre: J-pop; Dance-pop
- Length: 3:45
- Label: Universal Music Japan; Virgin
- Songwriter(s): Han Seung Hoon; Lee Sang Ho; Andreas Ohrn; Chris Wahle; Hasegawa; Anan
- Producer(s): Hoon; Ho; Ohrn; Wahle

AOA Japanese singles chronology
"Heart Attack" (2015)	"Give Me the Love" (2016)	"Good Luck" (2016)

Music video
- "Give Me the Love" on YouTube

"Give Me the Love" ("愛をちょうだい" (Ai wo Choudai)) is the fourth Japanese single by South Korean girl group AOA and the first single from their second Japanese studio album, Runway (2016). It features the additional guest vocals from the Japanese vocalist Takanori Nishikawa (T.M.Revolution). It is also AOA's first original Japanese song to be released as a physical single. It was released by Universal Music Japan on April 20, 2016 under 11 different physical versions and as a digital download.

A remake Korean version of the song, which titled "너 때문에 (Help Me)," was later included in their debut Korean studio album Angel's Knock (2017).

== Background and release ==
In February 2016, it was announced that "Give Me the Love" would be released as AOA's fourth and first original Japanese physical single.

Later in that month, artworks for 11 versions of the single—including Limited Editions Type A / B / C, Regular Edition, and Limited Picture Label Member Editions—were revealed.

In March 2016, it was revealed that the Japanese version of "Girl's Heart," which was originally released in their second extended play Like a Cat (2015) and a new original song titled "Still Falls the Rain" would be included as B-sides for the single's tracklist.

On April 8, "Give Me the Love" was available for pre-release download on iTunes Japan.

The single was officially released on April 20, 2016 as a physical single under 11 different versions and also available for purchase on iTunes Japan.

== Music video ==
On March 29, 2016, Universal Music Japan released the short version of the music video on their official YouTube channel, revealing for the first time the audio and video of the song.

The official music video was released on April 20 through AOA's official Vevo account.

The music video for the dance version, which features only AOA members, was released a week later on April 27.

== Chart performance ==
The physical single debuted at number 3 on the Oricon Daily Singles Chart for April 19, 2016. It was reported that "Give Me the Love" sold 30,253 copies in Japan in the first week, peaking at number 3 on the Oricon Weekly Singles Chart.

The single has sold a total of 33,010 copies, as of October 2016.

== Track listing and formats ==
- Digital download
1. "Give Me the Love" (feat. Takanori Nishikawa) – 3:45
- Japan CD single - limited type A/B/C and regular editions / digital download EP
1. "Give Me the Love" (feat. Takanori Nishikawa) – 3:45
2. "Still Falls the Rain" – 3:17
3. "Girl's Heart" (Japanese version) – 3:19
4. "Give Me the Love" (Karaoke version; feat. Takanori Nishikawa] – 3:45
5. "Still Falls the Rain" (instrumental) – 3:17
6. "Girl's Heart" (instrumental) – 3:19
7. "Give Me the Love" – 3:46 (iTunes Store EP bonus track)
- Japan CD single - limited picture label member editions
1. "Give Me the Love" (feat. Takanori Nishikawa) – 3:45
2. "Still Falls the Rain" – 3:17
- Japan CD single - limited edition "type A" DVD track list
1. "Give Me the Love" (music video) [feat. Takanori Nishikawa]
2. "Give Me the Love" (Music Video - Dance Version)
3. 1st Concert in Japan: Angels World 2015 ~Oh Boy Academy~ Digest #1

1. "Heart Attack" (Japanese version)
2. "Short Hair" (Japanese version)
3. "Like a Cat" (Japanese version)

- Japan CD single - limited edition "type B" DVD track list
1. "Give Me the Love" (music video) [feat. Takanori Nishikawa]
2. "Give Me the Love" (making the video)
3. 1st Concert in Japan: Angels World 2015 ~Oh Boy Academy~ Digest #2

1. "Elvis" (Japanese version)
2. "Miniskirt" (Japanese version)
3. "Oh Boy"

== Charts ==
Chart	Peak position	Sales
Oricon Daily Singles Chart	1	33,010+
Oricon Weekly Singles Chart	3	33,010+
Oricon Monthly Singles Chart	14	33,010+

== Release history ==
Region	Date	Format	Label	Edition(s)
Japan	April 8, 2016	Digital download	Universal Music Japan, Virgin Music	Pre-release single
Japan	April 20, 2016	CD + DVD	Universal Music Japan, Virgin Music	Limited editions (type A, type B)
Japan	April 20, 2016	CD + Photobook	Universal Music Japan, Virgin Music	Limited edition (type C)
Japan	April 20, 2016	CD	Universal Music Japan, Virgin Music	Limited picture label member editions, regular edition
Japan	April 20, 2016	Digital download	Universal Music Japan, Virgin Music	Regular edition
