= Choirboys (album) =

Studio album by Choirboys
- Released: July 1983
- Recorded: Albert Studios, Sydney 1983
- Genre: Hard rock, pub rock
- Length: 36:13
- Label: Albert Productions
- Producer: Jim Manzie

Choirboys chronology
Choirboys (1983)	Big Bad Noise (1987)

Singles from Choirboys
- 1. "Never Gonna Die" Released: July 1983; 2. "Talk Big" Released: September 1983; 3. "Boys in the Band" Released: November 1983

Choirboys is the debut self-titled album of the Australian rock band Choirboys. The album was recorded in early 1983 at Albert Studios One in Sydney, Australia with producer, Jim Manzie and released in July of the same year.

The first single, "Never Gonna Die," was released with great success and reached 30 on the Australian singles charts in late 1983. Australian TV personality and music guru Ian "Molly" Meldrum hailed the album as, "destined to become an Aussie classic." On the strength of their debut album, Choirboys, were invited to open for Cold Chisel on their "Last Stand" tour.

== Track listing ==
1. "Running from the Storm" - 2:15
2. "Talk Big" - 3:04
3. "Never Gonna Die" - 4:03
4. "You're With The Big Boys Now (Carrie)" - 3:13
5. "Boys in the Band" - 4:59
6. "Fight by the Book" - 3:33
7. "Bought and Paid For" - 3:43
8. "I'm Not Your Hero" - 4:05
9. "Blood is Thicker than Water" - 3:20
10. "Bullshit" - 3:58

== Charts ==
Chart performance for Choirboys
Chart (1983)	Peak position
Australian Albums (Kent Music Report)	26
