= Yo-Yo (album) =

Studio album by The Choirboys
- Released: 1996
- Label: Camouflage
- Producer: Peter Blyton

The Choirboys chronology
Dancing on the Grave of Rock n' Roll (1994)	Yo-Yo (1996)	Evolver (2004)

Singles from Yo-Yo
- 1. "Solo" Released: 1996

Yo-Yo was released by Australian hard rock group The Choirboys in 1996 and is the follow-up to their previous studio album, Dancing on the Grave of Rock n' Roll. The album was recorded in Cologne, Germany with producer Peter Blyton. "Solo" was released as a single in December and soon after, drummer Barton Price left the group.

A limited edition twin-CD package of Yo-Yo and Dancing on the Grave of Rock n' Roll was also released. Yo-Yo didn't get the publicity of their early albums and failed to make an impact in the charts when it was released.

== Track listing ==
1. "Lonely"
2. "Angeline"
3. "One Way Street"
4. "Drops Like a Stone"
5. "Gone"
6. "White Trash"
7. "Solo"
8. "Can't Believe"
9. "This Is My Summer"
10. "Amsterdam"
11. "Knife"
12. "Zanzibar"
13. "Mary's Wall"

== Personnel ==
Choirboys

- Mark Gable – vocals, guitars, keyboards
- Ian Hulme – vocals, bass guitar
- Richard Lara – guitar
- Barton Price – drums, percussion, backing vocals

Production details

- Producer – Peter Blyton
