= Feel the Heat (album) =

Studio album by The Radiators
- Released: March 1980
- Studio: Music Farm Studios and Trafalgar Studios, New South Wales, Australia
- Genre: Pop rock, new wave
- Label: WEA
- Producer: Charles Fisher, The Radiators

The Radiators chronology
Feel the Heat (1980)	You Have the Right to Remain Silent (1981)

Singles from Feel the Heat
- 1. "Comin' Home" Released: September 1979; 2. "Fess' Song"/"Gimme Head" Released: February 1980; 3. "Hit and Run" Released: May 1980

Feel the Heat is the debut studio album by Australian band The Radiators. The album as released in March 1980 and peaked at number 22 on the Australian Albums Chart and was certified platinum, selling 90,000 copies. A limited edition featured a bonus disc with the tracks "Fess' Song" and "Gimme Head".

The Radiators became the first Australian band to have advance/pre-sales on a début album with 6,000 copies being shifted before its release.

== Track listing ==
Side A
No.	Title	Writer(s)	Length
1.	"Summer Holiday"	Brian Nichol	4:29
2.	"All of Your Love"	Nichol, Geoff Turner	3:16
3.	"Reason"	Nichol, Fess Parker	2:58
4.	"Comin' Home"	Turner	3:06
5.	"Numbers"	Turner	3:02

Side B
No.	Title	Writer(s)	Length
1.	"17 (I Wish I Was)"	Nichol	5:13
2.	"Nancy Can't Dance"	Turner	2:50
3.	"Hit and Run"	Nichol, Turner	4:19
4.	"It's Easy"	Turner	3:16
5.	"Radiation"	Turner	4:38

Side C (Limited Edition)
No.	Title	Writer(s)	Length
1.	"Fess' Song"	Nichol	4:25

Side D (Limited Edition)
No.	Title	Writer(s)	Length
1.	"Gimme Head"	Turner	2:40

== Charts ==
Chart (1980)	Peak position
Australian Albums (Kent Music Report)	22

== Certifications ==
Region	Certification	Certified units/sales
Australia (ARIA)	Platinum	50,000^{^}
^{^} Shipments figures based on certification alone.
