= Life's a Gamble (The Radiators album) =

Studio album by The Radiators
- Released: December 1984
- Studio: Studios 301, Sydney, Australia
- Genre: Rock
- Label: EMI Music
- Producer: Ken Scott

The Radiators chronology
Scream of the Real (1983)	Life's a Gamble (1984)	Nasty Habits in Nice Children (1987)

Singles from Life's a Gamble
- 1. "Life's a Gamble" Released: November 1984; 2. "A Bit of Pain Never Hurts" Released: February 1985

Life's a Gamble is the fourth studio album by Australian band The Radiators. The album was released in December 1984 and peaked at number 47 on the Australian Albums Chart.

== Track listing ==
Side A
No.	Title	Writer(s)	Length
1.	"Life's a Gamble"	Geoff Turner	3:16
2.	"I'd Die for You"	Brian Nichol	3:43
3.	"Suddenly We're Strangers"	Turner	3:03
4.	"Getting Away From It All"	Turner	3:22
5.	"A Bit of Pain Never Hurts"	Turner	3:14
6.	"Let's Do It Again"	Turner	3:07

Side B
No.	Title	Writer(s)	Length
1.	"Hollywood (The Love You Steal)"	Turner	4:29
2.	"Night Slave"	Nichol, Stephen Parker	4:37
3.	"Scratch It Off"	Nichol	3:23
4.	"Scream of the Real"	Nichol	3:20
5.	"Rock and Roll Carnivore"	Nichol	5:08

== Charts ==
Chart (1984/85)	Position
Australian Chart (Kent Music Report)	47
