= Dancing on the Grave of Rock n' Roll =

Studio album by The Choirboys
- Released: 1994
- Genre: hard rock
- Label: Ravenswood, Big Bad Music
- Producer: Mark Gable, Ian Hulme

The Choirboys chronology
Midnight Sun (1991)	Dancing on the Grave of Rock n' Roll (1994)	Yo-Yo (1996)

Singles from Dancing on the Grave of Rock n' Roll
- 1. "Hard Heart" Released: 1994; 2. "Drops Like a Stone" Released: 1995

Dancing on the Grave of Rock n' Roll is the fourth studio album by Australian hard rock band The Choirboys which was released in 1994 and is the follow-up to their previous studio album, Midnight Sun. It was produced by mainstay band members Mark Gable and Ian Hulme. Dancing on the Grave of Rock n' Roll didn't get the publicity of previous albums and failed to make an impact in the charts when released.

== Track listing ==
1. "Friday Night" – (Mark Gable, Ian Hulme, Lindsay Tebbutt, Brett Williams)
2. "Drops Like a Stone" – (Gable, Hulme)
3. "Hard Heart" – (Gable)
4. "Don't Say Goodbye" – (Gable, Hulme)
5. "Feels Good" – (Gable, Hulme)
6. "Dancing on the Grave of Rock n' Roll" – (Hulme)
7. "Keep It Up" – (Gable, Hulme)
8. "Della Meets Mr. Danger" – (Gable, Hulme)
9. "I Was a Boy Then" – (Gable, Hulme)
10. "Man in the Middle" – (Gable, Hulme)
11. "Alright Now" – (Gable, Hulme, Brad Carr, Tebbutt)
12. "My Recommendation" – (Gable, Hulme, Barton Price, Tebbutt, B Williams)
13. "Freudenstein's Monster" – (Gable, Hulme, Brad Heaney)

== Personnel ==
Choirboys

- Mark Gable – vocals, guitars, keyboards
- Ian Hulme – vocals, bass guitar

Additional musicians

- Bernie Bremond – saxophone
- Brad Heaney – drums
- Rory Mckenzie – drums
- Gene O'Reilly – guitar
- Russell Pilling – backing vocals
- Suzanne Serelle – backing vocals
- Dave Steel – harmonica
- Gregory Mark Truswell – guitar, backing vocals
- Peter Wells – slide guitar

Production details

- Producer – Mark Gable, Ian Hulme
