= Midnight Sun (The Choirboys album) =

Studio album by The Choirboys
- Released: May 1991
- Recorded: 1990
- Studio: Cherokee Studios, Los Angeles, California USA
- Genre: Rock
- Label: Mushroom
- Producer: Marc Tanner, Choirboys

The Choirboys chronology
Big Bad Noise (1988)	Midnight Sun (1991)	Dead Drunk Live Hangovers (1991)

Singles from Big Bad Noise
- 1. "Rendezvous" Released: March 1991; 2. "Place with No Love" Released: June 1991

Midnight Sun is the third studio album by the Australian hard rock band The Choirboys, released in May 1991.

== Track listing ==
1. "Midnight Sun"
2. "Our Empire Falls"
3. "Moon"
4. "Rise Up"
5. "Place With No Love"
6. "Rendezvous"
7. "Only America"
8. "Battle Boulevard"
9. "Going Home (For Cathel)"
10. "Romance Street"
11. "We Can Dance"
12. "We Believed"

== Charts ==
Chart performance for Midnight Sun
Chart (1991)	Peak position
Australian Albums (ARIA)	30
