= Comin' Home (The Radiators song) =

Single by The Radiators

from the album Feel the Heat
- A-side: "Comin' Home"
- B-side: "Numbers"
- Released: September 1979
- Recorded: Trafalgar Studios
- Genre: Rock music
- Length: 3:06
- Label: WEA Music
- Songwriter(s): Geoff Turner
- Producer(s): Charles Fisher

The Radiators singles chronology
"Comin' Home" (1979)	"Fess' Song/Gimme Head" (1980)

"Comin' Home" is a song written by Geoff Turner and recorded by the Australian band The Radiators. The song was released in September 1979 as the band's debut single, which peaked at number 33 on the Australian Kent Music Report.

== Track listing ==
Side A: "Comin' Home"
Side B: "Numbers"

== Charts ==
Chart (1979/80)	Position
Australian Chart (Kent Music Report)	33

== Release history ==
Region	Date	Label	Format
Australia	September 1979	WEA Music (100109)	7" Single
