= The Radiators (Australian band) =

Australian pub rock band

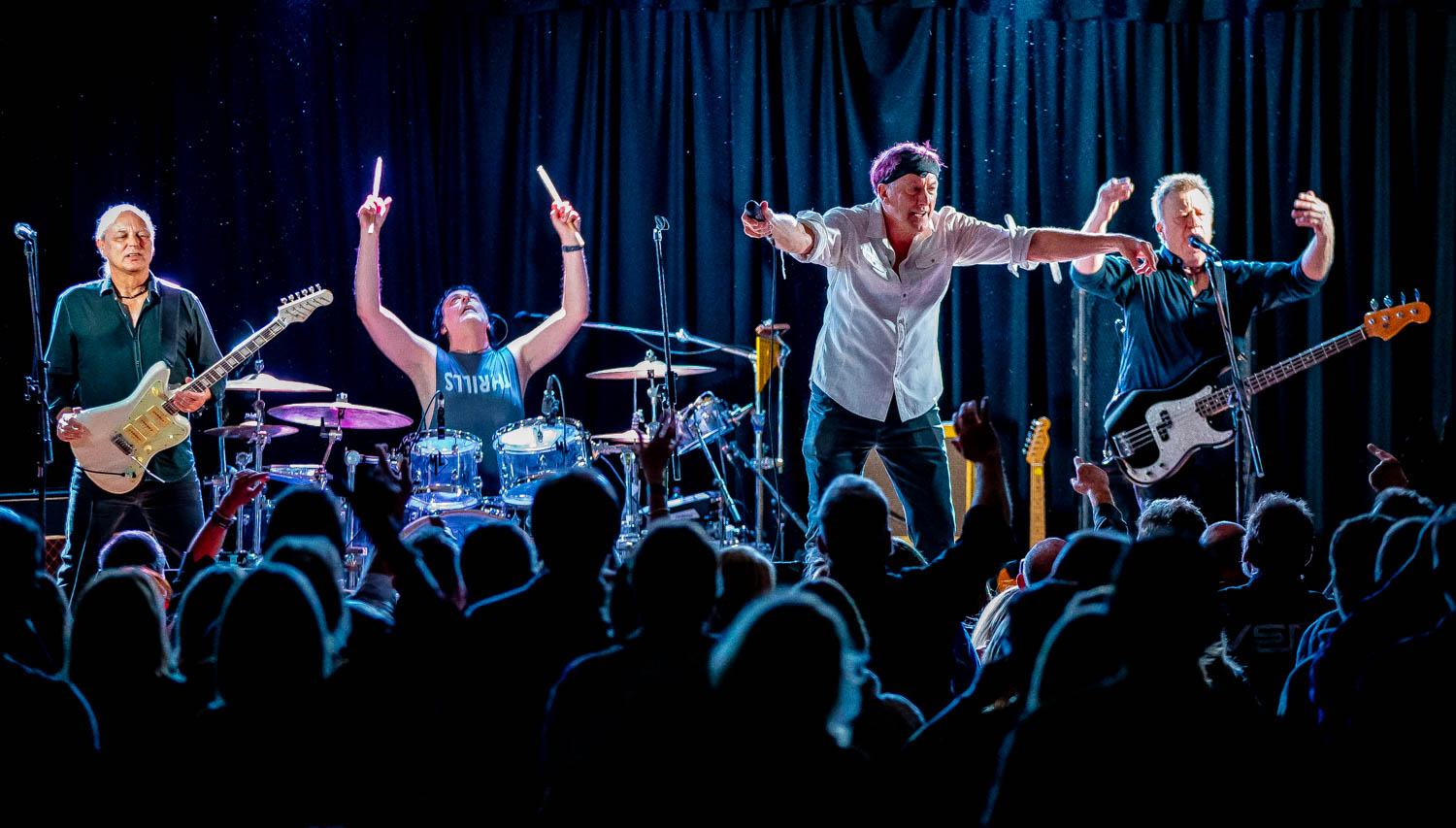
- The Radiators 2024

Background information
- Also known as: The Rads
- Origin: Sydney, New South Wales, Australia
- Genre: Pub rock
- Years active: 1978–present
- Labels: WEA, Powderworks, EMI, Mercury
- Spinoff of: Big Swifty
- Members: Brian Nichol; Geoff Turner; Mark Lucas; Martin Cilia
- Past members: Brent Dehn; Brendan Callinan; Chris Tagg; Mick Buckley; Brad Heaney; Stephen "Fess" Parker
- Website: theradiators.com

The Radiators are an Australian pub rock band formed in September 1978. Mainstay members are Brian Nichol on lead vocals, Stephen "Fess" Parker on guitar and Geoff Turner on bass. In 1989 they were joined by Mark Lucas on drums. Their most popular albums are Feel the Heat (March 1980) and Scream of the Real (May 1983), which both peaked in the top 25 of the Australian Kent Music Report Albums Chart. Their best known songs are "Comin' Home", "No Tragedy" and "Gimme Head". Rock music historian, Ian McFarlane described the group as "an archetypal, hard-working pub-rock band capable of delivering tightly crafted, well-executed, hard-hitting metal-pop anthems backed by a playful sense of humour. The band toured constantly, racking up over 2500 gigs by the early 1990s". They continue to play across Australia.

== History ==
The Radiators formed in Western Sydney in September 1978 as a pub rock band with Brendan Callinan on keyboards and vocals, Brian Nichol on lead vocals, Stephen "Fess" Parker on guitar, Chris Tagg on drums and Geoff Turner on bass. Nichol and Parker grew up in Bega where they attended the local high school. They formed a local group, Undecided, and in 1969 they relocated to Sydney. Callinan, Nichol, Parker and Tagg were all ex-members of hard rockers Big Swifty which had formed in 1975. Turner had been in Twister which had issued two singles in 1977 before disbanding. The Radiators signed with WEA Records and issued their debut single, "Comin' Home" in September 1979. It peaked at No. 33 on the Australian Kent Music Report Singles Chart. A second single, "Fess' Song/Gimme Head" was released in February 1980. In March 1980 the group released their first album, Feel the Heat, which was produced by Charles Fisher (Radio Birdman, Ol' 55). They supported the Australian leg of a tour by United Kingdom rock group, The Police.

In 1981 Powderworks Records released Up for Grabs in August, which reached the top 40. The Radiators signed with EMI Records and, in May 1983, released the album Scream of the Real, which peaked at No. 15 on the Australian Kent Music Report Albums Chart. That month its lead single, "No Tragedy" reached the top 30. In 1984 they released Life's a Gamble, which became their third platinum album. In June Tagg was replaced on drums by Mick Buckley. The group toured constantly, averaging 200 gigs a year and by 1985 had performed an estimated 1500 times, Turner explained, "Your fingers and throat start hurting ... It's a bit of a grind and it seems never-ending... [but] there's nothing else we'd rather do than play rock and roll. I can't imagine life without the Rads".

In late 1986, they signed with Mercury Records and released Nasty Habits in Nice Children in March 1987, which was produced by Peter Blyton (Chain). That June, Buckley was replaced on drums by Brad Heaney. Heaney was replaced in turn by Mark Lucas and then in 1988 Callinan left without being replaced. In January 1989 Heaney was a founding member of hard rock group, The Screaming Jets.

By the early 1990s, the band's "boogie rock" style was outmoded and Turner noted that media referred to their fans as "mindless yobbos from the west". However, rock music author, James Cockington, felt "[p]art of their appeal is their refusal to change their style, so that a 1978 gig and a 1998 gig are strangely similar experiences". Further albums include Radiators (October 1993), Stone (September 1995), In the Roar (1997) and Smoke and Mirrors (2000). In 2001 veteran Australian guitarist Ted Mulry was diagnosed with terminal brain cancer and a series of tribute concerts, Gimme Ted, were organised. The Radiators' performance on 10 March was recorded with seven-tracks issued on a 2× DVD as Gimme Ted – The Ted Mulry Benefit Concerts by Various Artists (2003).

The Radiators appeared in the Countdown Spectacular 2 concert series in Australia between late-August and early-September 2007. They sang two songs including "Comin' Home", which was issued on the associated 3× CD set, Countdown Spectacular Live – Volume Two (2007).

According to the band's website, as of 2008, the line up of Lucas, Nichol, Parker and Turner celebrated the group's 30th anniversary and toured throughout Australia. In June 2009 they performed at the 31st Annual Golden Stave Charity Luncheon at Sydney's Hordern Pavilion. Rock music historian, Ian McFarlane described the group as "an archetypal, hard-working pub-rock band capable of delivering tightly crafted, well-executed, hard-hitting metal-pop anthems backed by a playful sense of humour. The band toured constantly, racking up over 2500 gigs by the early 1990s"..

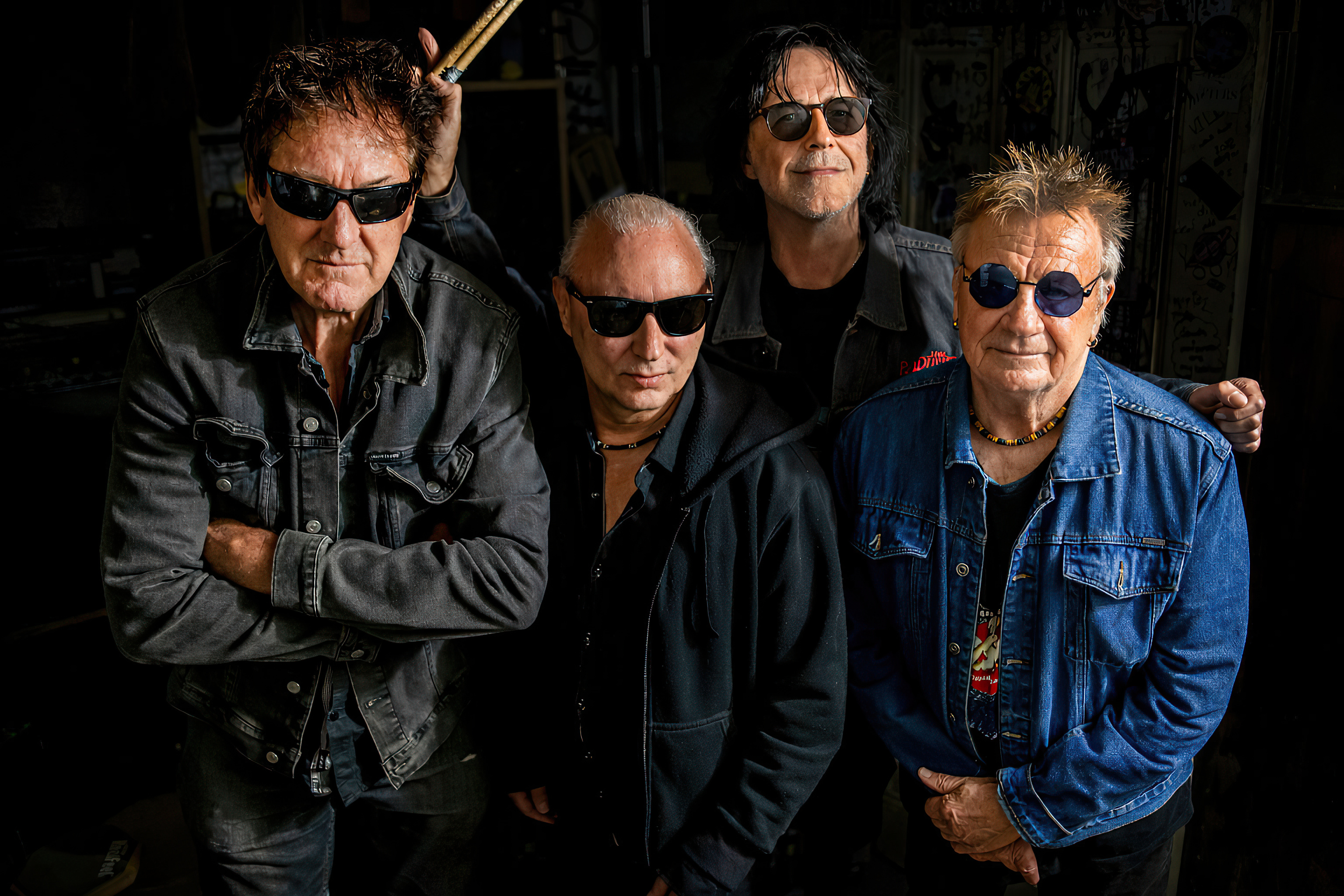
The Radiators at the Tote Hotel, Collingwood VIC. 21st March 2026.

Aside from his work with The Radiators, Lucas has taught drumming since the mid-1980s including students with attention deficit hyperactivity disorder (ADHD). As of 2008, Callinan is a sales and marketing manager of Roland Corporation and an executive committee member of Support Act Limited; his son is Australian musician Kirin J. Callinan. In May 2008, Buckley was a member of country music group, The Yeehaa Boys – alongside Steve Balbi (Noiseworks) – which issued a self-titled album.. Current guitarist Martin Cilia is known as Australia's Premier Surf Guitarist. He has released 10 solo albums and 2 EPs.

In May 2025 the "Best of" album Radiology - The Complete Anthology was reissued through Possum Records. The album debuted on the ARIA Australian Artist chart at number 8.

== Members ==
=== Current Lineup ===
- Brian Nichol – lead vocals (1978–present)
- Martin Cilia – guitar (2021–present)
- Geoff Turner – bass (1978–present)
- Mark Lucas – drums (1989–present)

=== Past members ===
- Tony Mollo (1978 - 1979)
- Brendan Callinan – keyboards (1979–1988)
- Stephen "Fess" Parker – guitar (1978–2013)
- Chris Tagg – drums (1978–1984)
- Mick Buckley – drums (1984–1987)
- Brad Heaney – drums (1987–1988)
- Brent Dehn – guitar (2013–2021)

Timeline

== Discography ==
=== Studio albums ===
Title	Details	Peak chart positions	Certifications
Title	Details	AUS (Kent)	Certifications
Feel the Heat	Released: March 1980; Label: WEA(600059)	22	AUS: Platinum
Up for Grabs	Released: August 1981; Label: Powderworks (MLF 441)	29	AUS: Gold
Scream of the Real	Released: May 1983; Label: EMI Music (EMX-121)	15	AUS: Gold
Life's a Gamble	Released: December 1984; Label: EMI Music (EMX-430024)	47	
Nasty Habits in Nice Children	Released: March 1987; Label: Mercury Records (830892-1)	68	
Hard Core	Released: 1991; Label: M Records (M001-CD)	-	
Radiators	Released: 1993; Label: M Records (MOO3-CD)	–	
Stone	Released: 1995; Label: M Records (M005-CD)	–	
Smoke and Mirrors	Released: 2000; Label: The Radiators (RADS001)	–	

=== Live albums ===
Title	Details	Peak chart positions
Title	Details	AUS (Kent)
Gimme .... Live	Released: March 1988; Label: Mercury (834143-1)	50
In the Roar	Released: 1997; Label: M Records (M007-CD)	–

=== Compilation albums ===
Title	Details
In Their Element	Released: 1995; Label: EMI Music (8146242)
Radiology - The Complete Anthology	Released: 2000; Label: WEA (8573816362)
25th Anniversary CD	Released: 2004; Label: Warner Music Australia (8573816362)

=== Extended plays ===
Title	Details	Peak chart positions	Certifications
Title	Details	AUS (Kent)	Certifications
You Have the Right to Remain Silent	Released: June 1981; Label: WEA (RADI 722)	58	AUS: Platinum
Four Grabs	Released: 1981 (promotion release); Label: Powderworks (POWT 2014)	N/A	

=== Singles ===
Year	Single	Peak chart positions	Album
Year	Single	AUS (Kent)	Album
1979	"Comin' Home"	33	Feel the Heat
1980	"Fess' Song"/"Gimme Head"	-	Feel the Heat
1980	"Hit and Run"	-	Feel the Heat
1981	"Room Full of Diamonds"	90	Up For Grabs
1981	"Up for Grabs"	-	Up For Grabs
1982	"Nothing's Changed"	-	Up For Grabs
1983	"No Tragedy"	27	Scream of the Real
1983	"You"	82	Scream of the Real
1983	"How Does it Feel" (European release)	-	Scream of the Real
1984	"Revolution"	41	non-album single
1984	"Life's a Gamble"	47	Life's a Gamble
1985	"A Bit of Pain Never Hurts"	-	Life's a Gamble
1986	"One Touch"	58	Nasty Habits in Nice Children
1986	"Bring on the Crazy"	65	Nasty Habits in Nice Children
1987	"Dreaming"	91	Nasty Habits in Nice Children
1987	"Love Ain't Love"	-	Nasty Habits in Nice Children
1988	"Summer Holiday" (live)	-	Gimme .... Live
1994	"Ain't That Just Like Me"	-	Radiators

== Awards ==
=== Mo Awards ===
The Australian Entertainment Mo Awards (commonly known informally as the Mo Awards), were annual Australian entertainment industry awards. They recognise achievements in live entertainment in Australia from 1975 to 2016. The Radiators won two awards in that time.

Year	Nominee / work	Award	Result (wins only)
2013	The Radiators	Best Rock Band/ Performer of the Year	Won
2015	The Radiators	Rock Act of the Year	Won
