= List of awards and nominations received by GFriend =

GFriend awards and nominations
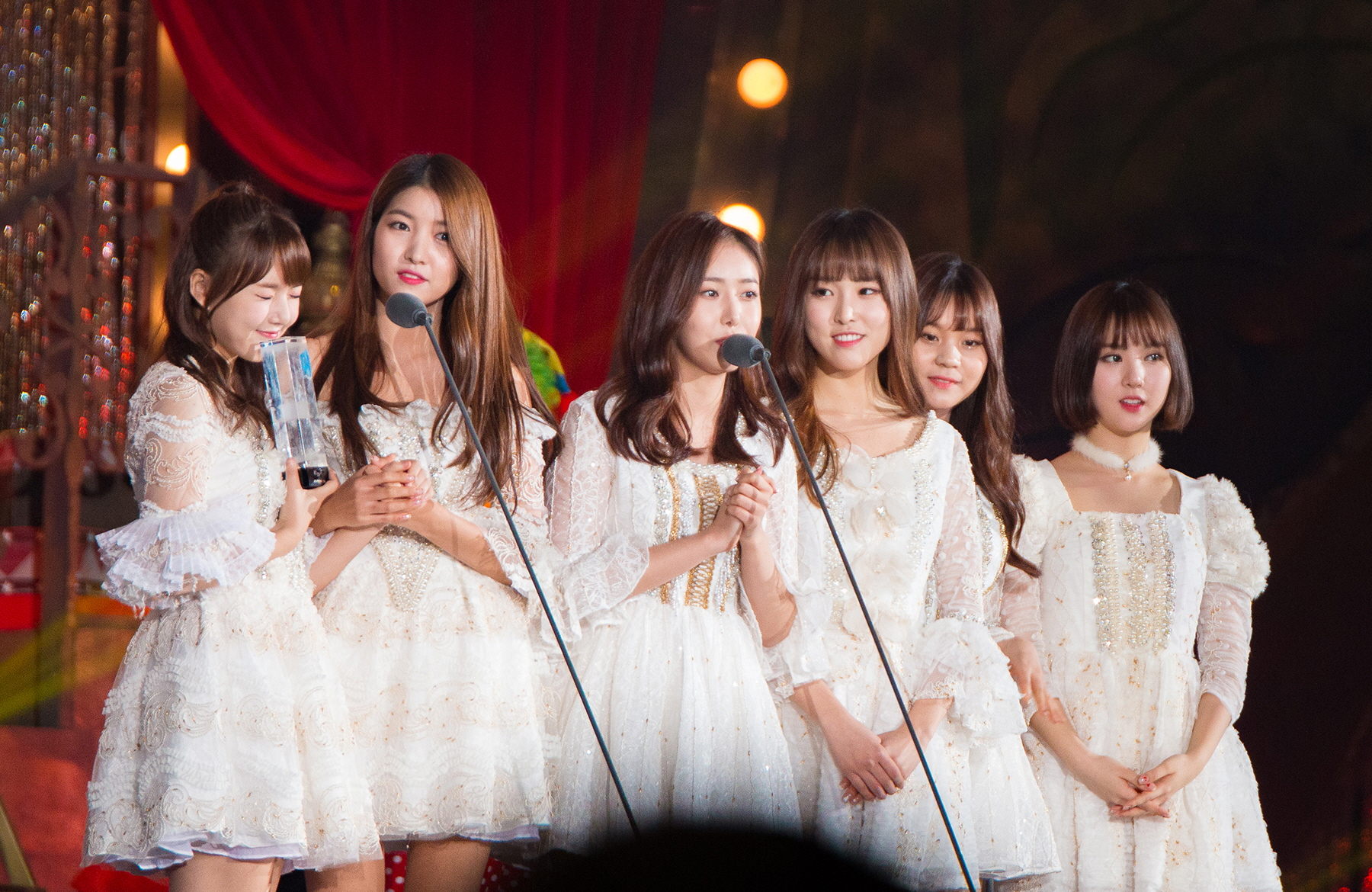
- GFriend at the 2016 Melon Music Awards
Awards and nominations
Award	Wins	Nominations
APAN Music Awards	0	2
Asia Artist Awards	0	5
Asia Model Awards	1	1
Brand Customer Loyalty Awards	0	1
Bugs Music Awards	2	2
Gaon Chart Music Awards	3	8
Genie Music Awards	0	5
Golden Disc Awards	4	19
Japan Gold Disc Award	1	1
KBS World Global Fan Awards	0	1
Korea PD Awards	1	1
Korean Culture Entertainment Awards	1	1
Melon Music Awards	5	17
Mnet Asian Music Awards	1	19
MTN Broadcast Advertising Awards	1	1
MTV Europe Music Awards	1	3
Seoul Music Awards	3	21
Soompi Awards	1	11
Soribada Best K-Music Awards	2	9
The Fact Music Awards	1	1
V Live Awards	2	5
Yahoo! Asia Buzz Awards	0	1
YinYueTai V-Chart Awards	1	1

Totals (Note: Certain award groups do not simply award one winner. They acknowledge several different recipients, have runners-up, and have third place. Since this is a specific recognition and is different from losing an award, runner-up mentions are considered wins in this award tally. For simplification and to avoid errors, each award in this list has been presumed to have had a prior nomination.)
- Wins: 31
- Nominations: 136

This is a list of awards and nominations received by GFriend, a South Korean girl group formed by Source Music, since their debut in 2015. Their debut extended play Season of Glass, released in January 2015, won the group several new artist awards between late 2015 to early 2016, including at the 5th Gaon Chart Music Awards, the 30th Golden Disc Awards and the 25th Seoul Music Awards.

The group's third extended play Snowflake single "Rough" won the group several awards between late 2016 to early 2017, including Song of the Year – January at the 7th Gaon Chart Music Awards. The single also won the Best Dance award and Digital Bonsang award at the 2016 Melon Music Awards, the 2016 Mnet Asian Music Awards and the 31st Golden Disc Awards, respectively.

== Awards and nominations ==
Name of the award ceremony, year presented, category, nominee of the award, and the result of the nomination
Award ceremony	Year	Category	Nominee / work	Result	Ref.
APAN Music Awards	2020	Idol Champ Global Pick – Group	GFriend	Nominated	
APAN Music Awards	2020	Top 10 (Bonsang)	GFriend	Nominated	
Asia Artist Awards	2016	Most Popular Artists (Singer) - Top 50	GFriend	Nominated	
Asia Artist Awards	2017	Most Popular Artists (Singer) - Top 50	GFriend	Nominated	
Asia Artist Awards	2018	Most Popular Artists (Singer) - Top 50	GFriend	Nominated	
Asia Artist Awards	2019	Most Popular Artists (Singer) - Top 50	GFriend	Nominated	
Asia Artist Awards	2019	Starnews Popularity Award (Female Group)	GFriend	Nominated	
Asia Model Awards	2017	Popular Star Award (Singer)	GFriend	Won	
Brand Customer Loyalty Awards	2021	Best Female Idol Group	GFriend	Nominated	
Bugs Music Awards	2020	20th Anniversary – Most Loved Song	"Rough"	Won	
Bugs Music Awards	2020	20th Anniversary – Most No. 1 Song	"Rough"	Won	
Gaon Chart Music Awards	2016	New Artist of the Year (Female)	GFriend	Won	
Gaon Chart Music Awards	2017	Song of the Year (January)	"Rough"	Won	
Gaon Chart Music Awards	2017	Song of the Year (July)	"Navillera"	Nominated	
Gaon Chart Music Awards	2018	Song of the Year (March)	"Fingertip"	Nominated	
Gaon Chart Music Awards	2018	Song of the Year (August)	"Love Whisper"	Nominated	
Gaon Chart Music Awards	2019	Song of the Year (April)	"Time for the Moon Night"	Nominated	
Gaon Chart Music Awards	2019	Performer of the Year (Instrumentals)	"Time for the Moon Night"	Won	
Gaon Chart Music Awards	2021	Mubeat Global Choice Award	GFriend	Nominated	
Genie Music Awards	2019	The Top Artist	GFriend	Nominated	
Genie Music Awards	2019	The Female Group	GFriend	Nominated	
Genie Music Awards	2019	The Performing Artist (Female)	GFriend	Nominated	
Genie Music Awards	2019	Genie Music Popularity Award	GFriend	Nominated	
Genie Music Awards	2019	Global Popularity Award	GFriend	Nominated	
Golden Disc Awards	2016	New Artist of the Year	GFriend	Won	
Golden Disc Awards	2016	Popularity Award	GFriend	Nominated	
Golden Disc Awards	2016	Global Popularity Award	GFriend	Nominated	
Golden Disc Awards	2017	Digital Daesang	"Rough"	Nominated	
Golden Disc Awards	2017	Digital Bonsang	"Rough"	Won	
Golden Disc Awards	2017	Disc Bonsang	LOL	Nominated	
Golden Disc Awards	2017	Popularity Award	GFriend	Nominated	
Golden Disc Awards	2017	Asian Choice Popularity Award	GFriend	Nominated	
Golden Disc Awards	2018	Disc Bonsang	The Awakening	Nominated	
Golden Disc Awards	2018	Best Female Group	GFriend	Won	
Golden Disc Awards	2018	Genie Popularity Award	GFriend	Nominated	
Golden Disc Awards	2018	Global Popularity Award	GFriend	Nominated	
Golden Disc Awards	2019	Digital Bonsang	"Time for the Moon Night"	Nominated	
Golden Disc Awards	2019	Best Female Group	GFriend	Won	
Golden Disc Awards	2019	Popularity Award	GFriend	Nominated	
Golden Disc Awards	2019	NetEase Music Global Star Popularity Award	GFriend	Nominated	
Golden Disc Awards	2020	Disc Bonsang	Time for Us	Nominated	
Golden Disc Awards	2020	Popularity Award	GFriend	Nominated	
Golden Disc Awards	2020	NetEase Music Fans' Choice K-pop Star Award	GFriend	Nominated	
Japan Gold Disc Award	2019	Best 3 New Artist (Asia)	GFriend	Won	
KBS World Global Fan Awards	2018	Best Artist (Female)	GFriend	Nominated	
Korea PD Awards	2016	Best Program Guest Award	GFriend	Won	
Korean Culture Entertainment Awards	2016	K-pop Best Girl Group Award	GFriend	Won	
Melon Music Awards	2015	Best New Artist (Female)	GFriend	Won	
Melon Music Awards	2016	Album of the Year	Snowflake	Nominated	
Melon Music Awards	2016	Song of the Year	"Rough"	Nominated	
Melon Music Awards	2016	Best Dance (Female)	"Rough"	Won	
Melon Music Awards	2016	Artist of the Year	GFriend	Nominated	
Melon Music Awards	2016	Top 10 Artists	GFriend	Won	
Melon Music Awards	2016	Netizen Popularity Award	GFriend	Nominated	
Melon Music Awards	2016	Kakao Hot Star Award	GFriend	Nominated	
Melon Music Awards	2017	Top 10 Artists	GFriend	Nominated	
Melon Music Awards	2017	1theK Performance Award	GFriend	Won	
Melon Music Awards	2017	Kakao Hot Star	GFriend	Nominated	
Melon Music Awards	2018	Top 10 Artists	GFriend	Nominated	
Melon Music Awards	2018	Kakao Hot Star Award	GFriend	Nominated	
Melon Music Awards	2018	Song of the Year	"Time for the Moon Night"	Nominated	
Melon Music Awards	2018	Best Music Video	"Time for the Moon Night"	Won	
Melon Music Awards	2019	Top 10 Artists	GFriend	Nominated	
Melon Music Awards	2019	Best Dance (Female)	"Sunrise"	Nominated	
Mnet Asian Music Awards	2015	Artist of the Year	GFriend	Nominated	
Mnet Asian Music Awards	2015	Best New Female Artist	GFriend	Nominated	
Mnet Asian Music Awards	2016	Song of the Year	"Rough"	Nominated	
Mnet Asian Music Awards	2016	Best Dance Performance (Female Group)	"Rough"	Won	
Mnet Asian Music Awards	2016	Artist of the Year	GFriend	Nominated	
Mnet Asian Music Awards	2016	Best Female Group	GFriend	Nominated	
Mnet Asian Music Awards	2016	Worldwide Favourite Artist	GFriend	Nominated	
Mnet Asian Music Awards	2017	Artist of the Year	GFriend	Nominated	
Mnet Asian Music Awards	2017	Best Female Group	GFriend	Nominated	
Mnet Asian Music Awards	2017	Song of the Year	"Love Whisper"	Nominated	
Mnet Asian Music Awards	2017	Best Dance Performance (Female Group)	"Love Whisper"	Nominated	
Mnet Asian Music Awards	2018	Artist of the Year	GFriend	Nominated	
Mnet Asian Music Awards	2018	Best Female Group	GFriend	Nominated	
Mnet Asian Music Awards	2019	Artist of the Year	GFriend	Nominated	
Mnet Asian Music Awards	2019	Best Female Group	GFriend	Nominated	
Mnet Asian Music Awards	2019	Worldwide Fans' Choice Top 10	GFriend	Nominated	
Mnet Asian Music Awards	2019	Song of the Year	"Sunrise"	Nominated	
Mnet Asian Music Awards	2019	Best Dance Performance – Female Group	"Sunrise"	Nominated	
Mnet Asian Music Awards	2019	2019 Qoo10 Favorite Female Artist	GFriend	Nominated	
MTN Broadcast Advertising Awards	2016	The Women CF Star Award	GFriend	Won	
MTV Europe Music Awards	2015	Best Korean Act	GFriend	Nominated	
MTV Europe Music Awards	2016	Best Korean Act	GFriend	Nominated	
MTV Europe Music Awards	2017	Best Korean Act	GFriend	Won	
Seoul Music Awards	2016	Best New Artist	GFriend	Won	
Seoul Music Awards	2016	Popularity Award	GFriend	Nominated	
Seoul Music Awards	2016	Hallyu Special Award	GFriend	Nominated	
Seoul Music Awards	2016	Bonsang Award	GFriend	Nominated	
Seoul Music Awards	2017	Daesang Award	GFriend	Nominated	
Seoul Music Awards	2017	Bonsang Award	GFriend	Won	
Seoul Music Awards	2017	Popularity Award	GFriend	Nominated	
Seoul Music Awards	2017	Hallyu Special Award	GFriend	Nominated	
Seoul Music Awards	2018	Bonsang Award	GFriend	Nominated	
Seoul Music Awards	2018	Popularity Award	GFriend	Nominated	
Seoul Music Awards	2018	Hallyu Special Award	GFriend	Nominated	
Seoul Music Awards	2019	Bonsang Award	GFriend	Nominated	
Seoul Music Awards	2019	Best Dance Performance	GFriend	Won	
Seoul Music Awards	2019	Popularity Award	GFriend	Nominated	
Seoul Music Awards	2019	Hallyu Special Award	GFriend	Nominated	
Seoul Music Awards	2020	Bonsang Award	GFriend	Nominated	
Seoul Music Awards	2020	Hallyu Special Award	GFriend	Nominated	
Seoul Music Awards	2020	Popularity Award	GFriend	Nominated	
Seoul Music Awards	2020	QQ Music Most Popular K-Pop Artist Award	GFriend	Nominated	
Seoul Music Awards	2021	The Fan-PD Artist Award	GFriend	Nominated	
Seoul Music Awards	2021	Whosfan-Dom Award	GFriend	Nominated	
Soompi Awards	2017	Best Female Group	GFriend	Nominated	
Soompi Awards	2017	Artist of the Year	GFriend	Nominated	
Soompi Awards	2017	Breakout Artist	GFriend	Nominated	
Soompi Awards	2017	Best Choreography	"Rough"	Nominated	
Soompi Awards	2017	Song of the Year	"Navillera"	Nominated	
Soompi Awards	2017	Album of the Year	LOL	Nominated	
Soompi Awards	2018	Best Female Group	GFriend	Won	
Soompi Awards	2018	Artist of the Year	GFriend	Nominated	
Soompi Awards	2018	Album of the Year	Parallel	Nominated	
Soompi Awards	2019	Best Female Group	GFriend	Nominated	
Soompi Awards	2019	Music Video of the Year	"Time for the Moon Night"	Nominated	
Soribada Best K-Music Awards	2017	Daesang Award	GFriend	Nominated	
Soribada Best K-Music Awards	2017	Bonsang Award	GFriend	Won	
Soribada Best K-Music Awards	2017	Popularity Award	GFriend	Nominated	
Soribada Best K-Music Awards	2018	Bonsang Award	GFriend	Nominated	
Soribada Best K-Music Awards	2018	Popularity Award (Female)	GFriend	Nominated	
Soribada Best K-Music Awards	2018	Global Fandom Award	GFriend	Nominated	
Soribada Best K-Music Awards	2019	Bonsang Award	GFriend	Nominated	
Soribada Best K-Music Awards	2019	Popularity Award (Female)	GFriend	Nominated	
Soribada Best K-Music Awards	2020	Bonsang Award	GFriend	Won	
The Fact Music Awards	2019	Artist of the Year (Bonsang)	GFriend	Won	
V Live Awards	2018	Global Artist Top 10	GFriend	Won	
V Live Awards	2018	Best Beagle Award	GFriend	Won	
V Live Awards	2019	Artist Top 10	GFriend	Nominated	
V Live Awards	2019	Best Channel – 1 million followers	GFriend	Nominated	
V Live Awards	2019	Global Artist Top 12	GFriend	Nominated	
Yahoo! Asia Buzz Awards	2016	Asia Popular Artist Award	GFriend	Nominated	
YinYueTai V-Chart Awards	2016	Rookie of the Year	GFriend	Won	

== Other accolades ==
=== Listicles ===
Name of publisher, year listed, name of listicle, and placement
Publisher	Year	Listicle	Placement	Ref.
Forbes	2017	Korea Power Celebrity	24th	
