= Kyō Kara Watashitachi wa: GFriend 1st Best =

- Digital and Type A edition cover

Compilation album by GFriend
- Released: May 23, 2018
- Recorded: 2015–2018
- Genres: J-pop; K-pop
- Length: 42:06
- Languages: Japanese; Korean
- Label: King

GFriend chronology
Time for the Moon Night (2018)	Kyō Kara Watashitachi wa: GFriend 1st Best (2018)	Sunny Summer (2018)

Singles from Kyō Kara Watashitachi wa: GFriend 1st Best
- 1. "Me Gustas Tu (Japanese Ver.)" Released: May 6, 2018

Kyō Kara Watashitachi wa: GFriend 1st Best (Japanese: 今日から私たちは ~GFRIEND 1st BEST~; stylized as Kyō Kara Watashitachi wa ~ GFRIEND 1st BEST ~) is the debut Japanese album by South Korean girl group GFriend and the first compilation album of the group. It was released on May 23, 2018, by King Records. A music video was released for the lead single "Kyō Kara Watashitachi wa (Me Gustas Tu)" on May 6, 2018.

== Release and promotion ==
Kyō Kara Watashitachi wa: GFriend 1st Best was released on May 23, 2018 in five editions: the regular one, two limited editions (Type A and Type B), the WEB one and the King e-Shop edition. The album contains Japanese and Korean versions of five of their previous title tracks as well as the song "Trust" from the EP Snowflake. The limited edition Type B contains as well a DVD with the music video of the Japanese version of "Me Gustas Tu" and the documentary movie of the group's Japanese debut.

== Track listing ==
CD - Limited edition A - B, Regular edition, King e-Shop edition
No.	Title	Lyrics	Music	Arrangement	Length
1.	"Glass Bead (Japanese version)"	SHOW	Iggy; Youngbae	Iggy; Youngbae	3:24
2.	"Me Gustas Tu (Japanese version)" (今日から私たちは; Kyō Kara Watashitachi wa)	anan	Iggy; Youngbae	Iggy; Youngbae	3:42
3.	"Rough (Japanese version)" (トキヲコエテ; Toki o Koete)	JUNE; Miz	Iggy; Youngbae	Iggy; Youngbae	3:30
4.	"Navillera (Japanese version)"	JUNE; Miz	Iggy; Youngbae	Iggy; Youngbae	3:15
5.	"Love Whisper (Japanese version)"	JUNE; Miz	Iggy; Youngbae	Iggy; Youngbae	3:33
6.	"Trust (Japanese version)"	SHOW; KAHO	Noh Joo-hwan; Lee Won-jong	Noh Joo-hwan; Lee Won-jong	3:38
7.	"Glass Bead (Korean version)"	Iggy; Youngbae	Iggy; Youngbae	Iggy; Youngbae	3:24
8.	"Me Gustas Tu (Korean version)"	Iggy; Youngbae	Iggy; Youngbae	Iggy; Youngbae	3:42
9.	"Rough (Korean version)"	Iggy; Youngbae	Iggy; Youngbae	Iggy; Youngbae	3:30
10.	"Navillera (Korean version"	Iggy; Youngbae	Iggy; Youngbae	Iggy; Youngbae	3:14
11.	"Love Whisper (Korean version)"	Iggy; Youngbae	Iggy; Youngbae	Iggy; Youngbae	3:33
12.	"Trust (Korean version)"	Noh Joo-hwan	Noh Joo-hwan; Lee Won-jong	Noh Joo-hwan; Lee Won-jong	3:35
Total length:					42:06

DVD – Limited edition B
No.	Title	Length
1.	"Me Gustas Tu (Japanese version)" (music video)	4:22
2.	"GFriend Japan Debut Documentary Movie"

== Charts ==
Chart (2018)	Peak position
Japanese weekly albums (Oricon)	10
Japanese monthly albums (Oricon)	25
Japanese albums (Japan Hot 100)	10
