= Me Gusta =

Me Gusta or variants may refer to:

- "Me Gusta" (Inna song), 2018
- "Me Gusta" (Natti Natasha song), 2018
- "Me Gusta" (Mikolas Josef song), 2018
- "Me Gusta" (Shakira and Anuel AA song), 2020, sampling Inner Circle's Sweat (A La La La La Long)
- "Me Gusta", a 2014 song by Dj R'AN featuring José de Rico, Willy William & Anna Torres
- "Me Gustas Tu" (GFriend song), a song by GFriend from the 2015 EP Flower Bud
- "Me gusta" (Anitta song), 2020 song by Anitta featuring Cardi B and Myke Towers

== See also ==
- Me gustas tú (disambiguation)
- Me gusta, pero me asusta, a 2017 Mexican comedy film directed by Beto Gómez
