= Touch (Sori song) =

2018 debut single by Sori

Single by Sori featuring Basick
- Released: September 4, 2018
- Recorded: 2018
- Genre: K-pop; dance
- Length: 3:01
- Label: Mol Entertainment
- Songwriter(s): Gamen Rider; Basick
- Producer(s): Gamen Rider

Sori singles chronology
"To Myself" (2017)	"Touch" (2018)	"I'm Ready" (2018)

Music video
- "Touch" on YouTube

"Touch" is a debut song by the South Korean singer and actress Sori featuring the rapper Basick. The song was released as the debut single of the former on September 4, 2018. "Touch" was arranged, composed, and penned by the record producer Gamen Rider. The music video premiered on the same day of the single's release and was directed by the film director Hong Won-gi of the video production company Zanybros.

== Background and promotion ==
Sori announced her debut as a solo artist through her official YouTube channel on July 31, 2018. In order to cover the expenses of her debut, a Makestar project was subsequently launched, running from August 1, 2018 until August 24, 2018. The project was an immense success, with approximately 250 supporters raising over $20,000. Her debut single titled "Touch" was announced on August 27, 2018 in conjunction with the reveal of its cover art. The cover art was shot by the photographer Nakamura Kazutaka, while the latex dress sported in the cover art was designed by the fashion designer Atsuko Kudo.

== Composition ==
"Touch" is an uptempo dance-pop love song with tropical influences. The song was arranged, composed, and penned by the record producer Gamen Rider, who previously produced a majority of the duo CocoSori's discography. "Touch" is three minutes and one second long. The song features the rapper Basick.

== Commercial performance ==
"Touch" was a minor commercial success, where the physical version of the single debuted and peaked at number 49 on the Gaon Album Chart on the chart issued on September 14, 2018.

== Music video ==
=== Background and release ===
A teaser for "Touch"'s music video was released on August 30, 2018. It ultimately premiered on September 4, 2018. The music video was directed by the film director Hong Won-gi of the video production company Zanybros. A choreography-centered version of the music video premiered on September 11, 2018. The choreography was created by the choreographer Choi Hyo-jin of the dance studio 1Million Dance Studio. A dancing competition using the song's choreography was subsequently held from September 12, 2018 until October 10, 2018, where the winner will receive ₩1,000,000.

=== Synopsis ===
The music video begins with Sori resting her head on an unorganized dining table decorated with a bowl of cereal, a pitcher filled with milk, and an apple. She subsequently sprinkles cereal inside of the bowl before getting up and consuming a spoonful. Sori falls on a bed being pushed by women in orange latex swimsuits soon after. Throughout the music video, the aforementioned women dance around Sori, accompanying her to the swimming pool, an art museum, a restaurant, and her bedroom. Miscellaneous shots include her undressing herself in a corridor, resting on a large apple, bathing in a bathtub filled with milk, playing with curtains, and falling from a building.

== Live performances ==
"Touch" was performed for the first time during its showcase held at the Dongja Art Hall in Seoul, South Korea on September 4, 2018. The song was subsequently performed on several music programs including KBS2's Music Bank, Mnet's M Countdown, SBS MTV's The Show, and MBC Music's Show Champion. Additionally, Sori performed "Touch" twice during a street performance in Hongdae, Seoul, with the first on September 8, 2018 and the second on December 29, 2018, in which she was accompanied by the internet personality StarTy.

== Track listing ==
Korean version
No.	Title	Lyrics	Music	Length
1.	"Touch"	Gamen Rider, Basick	Gamen Rider	3:01
2.	"Touch (Instrumental)"		Gamen Rider	3:01
Total length:				6:02

Japanese version
No.	Title	Lyrics	Music	Length
1.	"Touch (Japanese version)"	Gamen Rider, Basick	Gamen Rider	3:01
2.	"Touch (Korean version)"	Gamen Rider, Basick	Gamen Rider	3:01
3.	"Touch (Instrumental)"		Gamen Rider	3:01
Total length:				9:03

== Charts ==
Chart	Peak position
South Korea (Gaon Album Chart)	49

== Release history ==
List of release dates, showing region, release format(s), version(s), label(s) and reference(s)
Region	Date	Format(s)	Version(s)	Label(s)
Various	September 4, 2018	CD single; digital download; streaming	Official	Mol Entertainment
Japan	November 14, 2018	CD single; digital download; streaming	Japanese	IMX
