= I'm Ready (Sori song) =

2018 single by Sori

Single by Sori featuring Jaehyun
- Released: December 26, 2018
- Recorded: 2018
- Genre: K-pop; moombahton; dance
- Length: 3:09
- Label: Mol Entertainment
- Songwriter(s): Gamen Rider; Jaehyun
- Producer(s): Gamen Rider

Sori singles chronology
"Touch" (2018)	"I'm Ready" (2018)	"I Am Not Alone" (2019)

Music video
- "I'm Ready" on YouTube

"I'm Ready" is a song by the South Korean singer and actress Sori featuring the rapper Jaehyun. The song was released on December 26, 2018. "I'm Ready" was arranged, composed, and penned by the record producer Gamen Rider. The music video premiered on December 22, 2018, four days prior to the release of the single, and was directed by the film director Kyotaro Hayashi.

== Background and promotion ==
Following the conclusion of the promotional activities for the Japanese version of "Touch", Sori launched a Kickstarter project on December 7, 2018 in order to fund her sophomore release titled "I'm Ready". She subsequently uploaded videos of herself preparing the rewards for the supporters of the project on her official YouTube channel, which included a custom-made baseball cap with the song title printed on the front panels. When the project concluded on December 21, 2018, the project raised more than ¥3,000,000 by approximately 260 supporters.

== Composition ==
"I'm Ready" is an uptempo moombahton dance song with an "addictive refrain". The song is a musical departure from Sori's previous releases as a member of both CocoSori and Real Girls Project as well as "Touch", seeing her embrace a much more "mature" sound. "I'm Ready" was arranged, composed, and penned by the record producer Gamen Rider, who previously produced Sori's aforementioned debut single. The song features the rapper Jaehyun.

== Commercial performance ==
Following the re-release of the single on February 8, 2019 in Japan, "I'm Ready" enjoyed minor commercial success, where it debuted and peaked at number 126 on the Oricon Singles Chart on the chart issued on February 18, 2019.

== Music video ==
=== Background and release ===
A teaser of the music video for "I'm Ready" was released on December 17, 2018. It ultimately premiered on December 21, 2018 following the conclusion of the Kickstarter project and four days prior to the release of the single through music portals. It was filmed in several locations: the interior and the rooftop of a warehouse in Yokohama, and a bridge near the Yamanote Line, and the rooftop of a building in Shinjuku. A choreography-centered video for the song premiered on January 5, 2019, which was filmed in the temperature -7 °C (19.4 °F). The choreography was created by the choreographers MikuNana.

=== Synopsis ===
The music video opens with a train passing behind Sori. Subsequent scenes see her accompanied by MikuNana performing the choreography of "I'm Ready" in multiple settings including the interior of a warehouse, in front of shipping containers, and on top of a rooftop, during which they are joined by numerous dancers for the final chorus. The video closes with Sori crossing a pedestrian crossing.

== Live performances ==
Due to the single being released during the holiday season, Sori began promoting "I'm Ready" approximately a month following its release. She performed the song on several music programs including KBS2's Music Bank and SBS MTV's The Show. In addition to her music program performances, Sori held a street performance in Hongdae, Seoul, where she was accompanied by the South Korean internet personality StarTy for a performance of "I'm Ready" as well as other songs including "Touch", "What Is Love?" by the girl group Twice, and "Ddu-Du Ddu-Du" by the girl group Blackpink. The song was later performed during her first Japanese fanmeet titled "SoriNation in Japan", which was held on February 11, 2019 at Club Citta in Kawasaki, Kanagawa.

== Track listing ==
No.	Title	Lyrics	Music	Length
1.	"I'm Ready"	Gamen Rider, Jaehyun	Gamen Rider	3:09
2.	"I'm Ready (Instrumental)"		Gamen Rider	3:09
Total length:				6:18

== Charts ==
Chart	Peak position
Japan (Oricon Singles Chart)	126

== Release history ==
List of release dates, showing region, release format(s), version(s), label(s) and reference(s)
Region	Date	Format(s)	Version(s)	Label(s)
Various	December 26, 2018	CD single; digital download; streaming	Official	Mol Entertainment
Japan	February 9, 2019	CD single; digital download; streaming	Official	IMX
