= Flower Bud =

EP by GFriend
- Released: July 23, 2015
- Genre: K-pop; bubblegum pop
- Length: 19:36
- Label: Source Music; KT Music

GFriend chronology
| Season of Glass (2015) | Flower Bud (2015) | Snowflake (2016) |

Singles from Flower Bud
- 1. "Me Gustas Tu" Released: July 23, 2015

Flower Bud is the second extended play (EP) by South Korean girl group GFriend. It was released by Source Music on July 23, 2015 and distributed by KT Music. The album contains four songs, including the single "Me Gustas Tu", and one instrumental track. The album debuted at number six on the Gaon Album Chart and has sold more than 18,000 units. Musically, the album is in the bubblegum pop genre and is similar in style to Korean girl groups of the 1990s. Most of the tracks on the album were written by Iggy and Seo Yong-bae, who worked with the group on their debut album, Season of Glass.

GFriend promoted the album with a series of televised live performances on South Korea's music shows. "Me Gustas Tu" was noted for its powerful choreography, unusual for a girl group with an "innocent" image. A fan-taken video of the group performing the song on a slippery stage went viral in September 2015, boosting the group's popularity. The song peaked at number 8 on the Gaon Digital Chart and has sold over two million digital copies.

== Release and promotion ==
On July 13, 2015, Source Music announced the upcoming release of GFriend's second EP, Flower Bud. The album was released as a digital download on July 23, and was released in CD format on July 27. The music video for lead single "Me Gustas Tu" was produced by Zanybros and directed by Hong Won-ki. One of the settings is a "dream-like" forest with the members wearing white lace dresses and rompers. "Me Gustas Tu" is the second song in the group's "school series" and represents a trip during summer vacation. The group's "pure" image was complemented by powerful dance choreography, rare for a girl group with an "innocent" concept. The choreography was created by Park Jun-hee, and the most notable part involves Yerin vaulting over Umji, while Yuju slides underneath in a split. It took the group three months to perfect the difficult moves.

GFriend promoted the album with performances of "Me Gustas Tu" on various music shows, starting with M Countdown on July 23. On September 5, they performed the song at an SBS Radio event in Inje, Gangwon Province. The stage floor was wet due to the rain, and Yuju slipped and fell five times during the performance, while SinB fell once. A fan posted a video of the performance to YouTube, which subsequently went viral, boosting the group's popularity. Promotion for the album ended the next day, with a performance of "Glass Bead" and "Me Gustas Tu" on Inkigayo.

In January 2016, "Me Gustas Tu" was one of the songs broadcast via loudspeaker across the Korean Demilitarized Zone, as part of South Korea's anti-Pyongyang propaganda program Voice of Freedom. The broadcast was a response to a North Korean nuclear bomb test.

== Composition ==
"Me Gustas Tu" and "One" were written by Iggy and Rainbow Bridge World producer Seo Yong-bae, the team who also composed songs from GFriend's first album, including "Glass Bead". "Me Gustas Tu" means "I Like You" in Spanish, and the lyrics are about a girl's shy confession of love. The song was written to emphasize the members' "bright and youthful" qualities, and features "funky" synths, guitar, and Moog bass sounds. "Under the Sky" is a song about a girl's hopes for the future, and "My Buddy" is a song about friendship and love. "One" is a song about love, featuring acoustic guitar, strings, and electric piano. All four songs are medium-tempo dance songs similar in style to Korean girl groups of the 1990s.

== Reception ==
The album entered the weekly Gaon Album Chart at number six. It was the eighteenth best selling album during the month of July, selling 4,011 physical copies. By March 2016, it had sold more than 18,000 units. "Me Gustas Tu" entered the Gaon Digital Chart at number 27, and rose to number 15 the following week. It peaked at number eight after the "falling" performance video went viral. After the release of GFriend's third EP, Snowflake, "Me Gustas Tu" rose in the chart, ranking at number 12 the second week of February 2016. As of May 2016, it has sold 1.6 million digital downloads.

Won Ho-jung of The Korea Herald said GFriend "played it safe" with the album, going with the niche genre of bubblegum pop instead of the more popular EDM and hip hop, and maintaining the "sweet, innocent vibe" from their first album. Overall, Won said the songs were neither bad nor outstanding, and the group was posed to "solidify their position in the K-pop world" with their next release.

Multiple music critics said GFriend's songs are "characterized as being well-made with familiar, catchy melodies, resembling Japanese animated films' theme songs". Seo Jeong Min-gap said "Me Gustas Tu" was particularly polished and had "a strong sense of completion".

== Track listing ==
| No. | Title | Lyrics | Music | Arrangement | Length |
|---|---|---|---|---|---|
| 1. | "Intro (Flower Bud)" | | Iggy; Seo Yong-bae | Iggy; Seo | 1:19 |
| 2. | "Me Gustas Tu" (Korean: 오늘부터 우리는; RR: Oneulbuteo urineun; lit. '"From Today, We Are"') | Iggy; Seo | Iggy; Seo | Iggy; Seo | 3:40 |
| 3. | "Under the Sky" (하늘 아래서; Haneul araeseo) | Iggy | Iggy; Hong Beom-gyu; Kim Woong | Hong; Kim | 4:10 |
| 4. | "One" | Iggy; Seo | Iggy; Seo | Iggy; Seo | 3:14 |
| 5. | "My Buddy" (기억해; Gieokhae; '"Remember"') | Heuk Tae | Heuk Tae; Kwon Hyeok-ho | Heuk Tae | 3:33 |
| 6. | "Me Gustas Tu" (Instrumental) | | Iggy; Seo | Iggy; Seo | 3:40 |
| Total length: | | | | | 19:36 |

== Charts ==
| Chart | Peak position |
|---|---|
| South Korean Albums (Gaon) | 6 |

== Sales ==
| Country | Sales amount |
|---|---|
| South Korea | 18,355 |
