= Sori (singer) =

South Korean singer (born 1990)

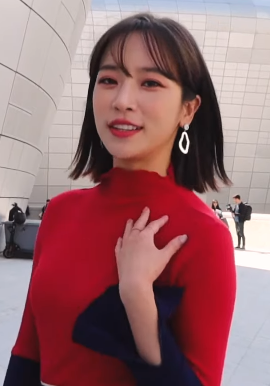
- Sori in November 2019
- Born: Kim So-ri; July 21, 1990 (age 36); Seoul, South Korea
- Occupations: Singer; actress
- Musical career
- Genres: K-pop; J-pop
- Instrument: Vocals
- Years active: 2016–present
- Label: B.able
- Formerly of: CocoSori; Real Girls Project

Korean name
- Hangul: 김소리
- Hanja: 金昭利
- RR: Gim Sori
- MR: Kim Sori

YouTube information
- Channel: 진짜소리
- Genre: Lifestyle
- Subscribers: 207 thousand
- Views: 12.7 million
- Last updated: July 26, 2026

Kim So-ri (Korean: 김소리; born July 21, 1990), professionally known by the mononym Sori (stylized as SoRi), is a South Korean singer and actress. She is a former member of the duo CocoSori and the project girl group Real Girls Project.

== Life and career ==
=== 1990–2014: Early life and career beginnings ===
Kim So-ri was born on July 21, 1990, in Mapo District, Seoul, South Korea. As a teenager, she migrated to Japan for her secondary education. Additionally, she became a cheerleader at her high school, which became the "base experience that made her yearn for the stage." Following three years in college, Kim returned to South Korea to pursue a career as a singer, where she signed with the South Korean entertainment company Mol Entertainment in 2013, subsequently appearing in the music video of "B.I.K.I.N.I" by Kim So-ri alongside Nine Muses member Sojin on August 15, 2013. She debuted as an actress the following year in KBS2's romantic comedy television series Hi! School: Love On, in which she portrayed a high school student.

=== 2016–2018: CocoSori and Real Girls Project ===
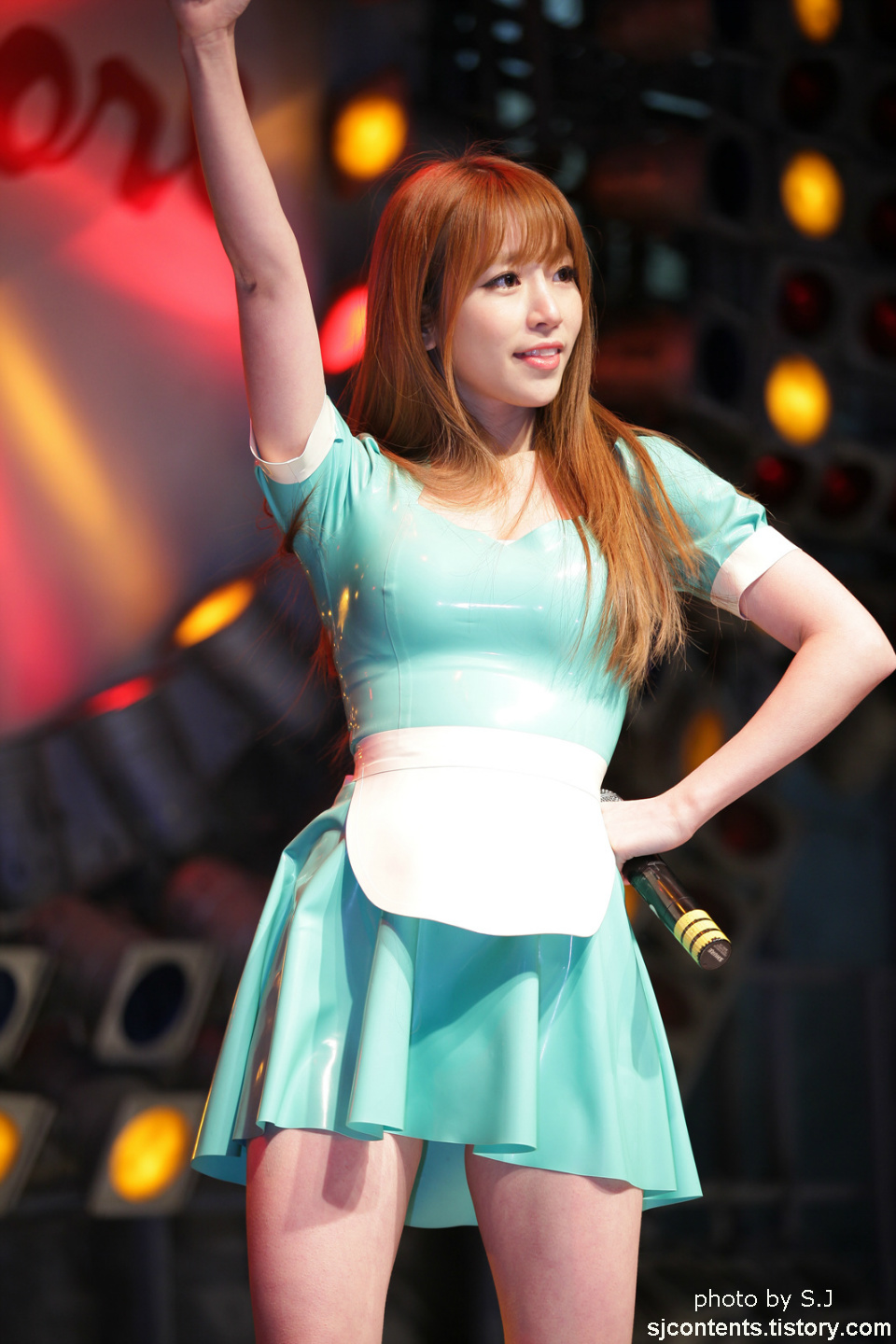
Sori in February 2016

Following three years of training, Kim debuted under the mononym SoRi as one-half of the duo CocoSori with the single "Dark Circle" on January 4, 2016. The duo's image was compared to the girl group Crayon Pop due to their similar musical direction and unconventional music videos. CocoSori auditioned to become members of the project girl group Real Girls Project on May 6, 2016, resulting in Sori scoring a spot in the group. The group debuted with the single "Dream" on August 24, 2016. Consequently, she was billed as one of the main cast members of Amazon Video's musical drama television series The Idolmaster KR, a South Korean adaption of the video game series of the same name. The series premiered on April 28, 2017, and ran for twenty-four episodes prior to its conclusion on October 6, 2017.

Alongside former Real Girls Project groupmates Heo Young-joo, Lee Ye-eun, and Yukika Teramoto, Sori competed as one of Mol Entertainment's four representatives in JTBC's reality television competition Mix Nine, during which she became the subject of controversy following a comment made by the judge Yang Hyun-suk regarding her age and the state of her career. She released a single titled "To Myself" in the midst of the controversy on November 5, 2017. Sori ultimately finished in seventh place in a field of ninety-seven female contestants and therefore became a member of the resulting girl group during the final episode on January 26, 2018. However, the group was defeated by their male counterpart for the opportunity to debut after the former garnered 7,866 points against the latter's 8,114 points.

=== 2018–2020: Solo career beginnings ===
Sori announced her debut as a solo artist through her official YouTube channel on July 31, 2018. She launched a Makestar project in order to fund the expenses of her debut on August 1, 2018. The project ultimately concluded on August 28, 2018, with over $20,000 raised by approximately 250 supporters. Sori's debut single titled "Touch", featuring the rapper Basick, was released on September 4, 2018, in conjunction with the premiere of its music video. The song was arranged, composed, and penned by the record producer Gamen Rider. The music video was directed by the film director Hong Won-gi of the video production company Zanybros. "Touch" was performed for the first time during its showcase held at the Dongja Art Hall in Seoul, South Korea on the day of its release. The single enjoyed minor commercial success, where its physical version debuted and peaked at number 49 on the Gaon Album Chart. To promote the single, Sori performed on music programs and radio programs, and held street performances as well. A Japanese version of "Touch" was released as her debut single in Japan on November 14, 2018, with the music video premiering two days later. The Japanese version was performed for the first time during its showcase, which was held for four days at the HMV flagship in Harajuku, Shibuya.

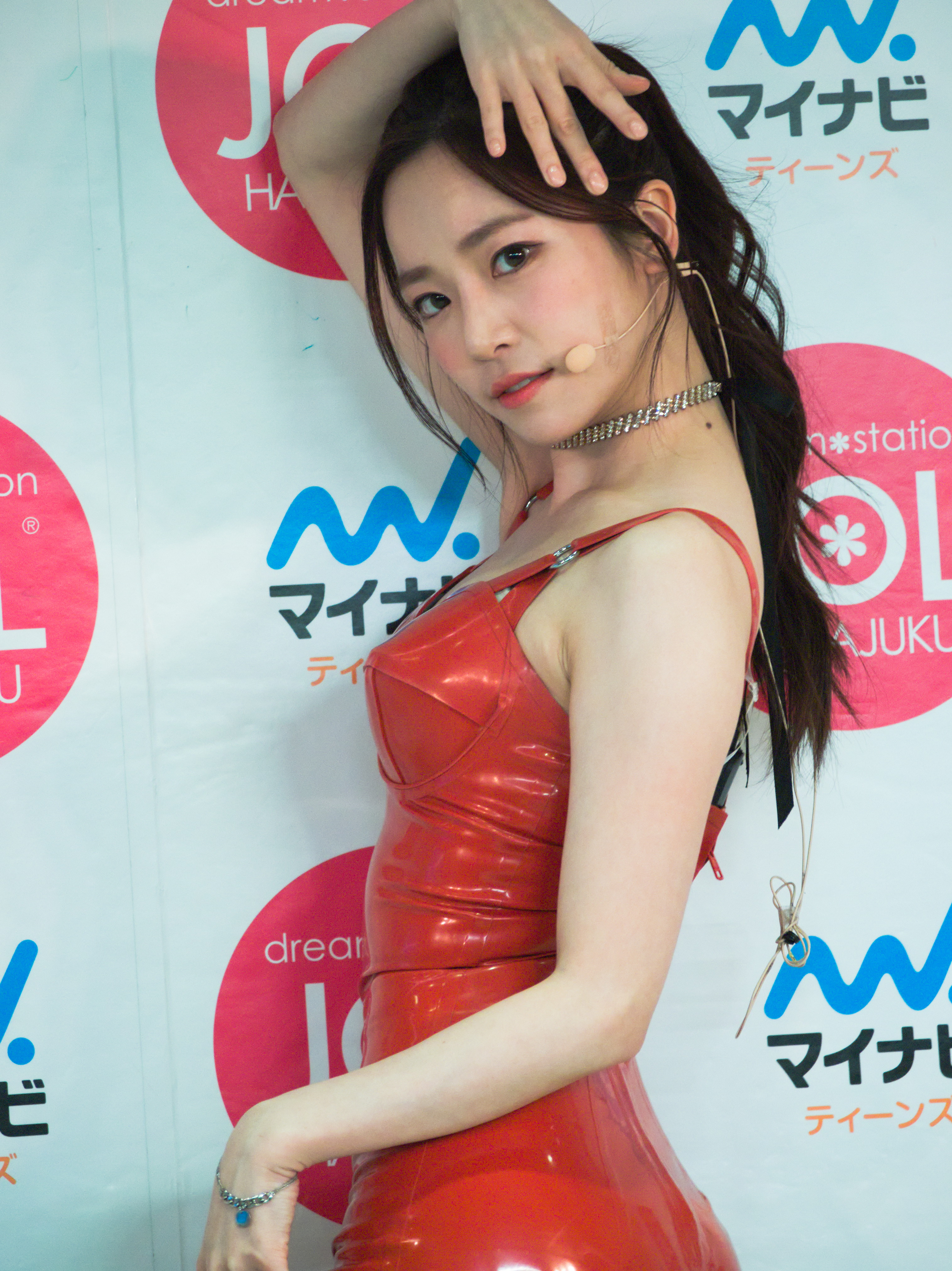
Sori in November 2018

Sori launched a Kickstarter project on December 7, 2018, in order to fund the expenses of her sophomore release. Throughout its run, she documented herself preparing the rewards for the supporters of the project on her YouTube channel. The project concluded on December 21, 2018, with over ¥3,000,000 raised by around 260 supporters. The music video for the song titled "I'm Ready", featuring the rapper Jaehyun, subsequently premiered ahead of its release. It was directed by the film director Kyotaro Hayashi. The single was ultimately released on December 26, 2018, through several music portals. "I'm Ready" was composed and penned by Gamen Rider, who previously worked on "Touch". Promotions for the single were held the following month due to the holiday season, which included a collaborative performance with the internet personality StarTy in Hongdae, Seoul. "I'm Ready" was re-released on February 8, 2019, in Japan prior to Sori's first fanmeet titled ''SoriNation in Japan", which was held on February 11, 2019, at Club Citta in Kawasaki, Kanagawa. The fanmeet was presented by the singer Miho Miyazaki, while choreographers MikuNana and former Real Girls Project groupmate Lee Su-ji appeared as guests. The single debuted and peaked at number 126 on the Oricon Singles Chart.

Following CocoSori's disbandment on March 6, 2019, Sori became the host of a segment titled Sori Action for TBS' variety show Fact in Star. Its first episode premiered on March 13, 2019, in which she analysed the music video of "Noir" by the singer Sunmi. Sori subsequently became a cast member of Channel J's travel documentary Travel in Japan That Even Japanese Don't Know for its fourth and fifth season set in the Ibaraki Prefecture and the Tottori Prefecture respectively. She announced that she will be releasing a collaboration with the record producer Folded Dragons as her third single through her official Patreon page on May 17, 2019. A Kickstarter project was subsequently launched in order to fund the expenses of the single, which ran from May 23, 2019, until June 20, 2019. The project concluded with approximately ¥1,900,000 raised by 245 supporters. Sori revealed the title of the song as "I Am Not Alone" with an accompanying still from its music video on July 1, 2019. The single was ultimately released in conjunction with the premiere of its performance-oriented music video on July 10, 2019. It was directed by the film director Park Sang-won of the Zanybros. "I Am Not Alone" was arranged and penned by the rapper Grace under the pseudonym Storm. Sori became a cast member of the second season of Mnet's reality television series Somebody, which premiered its first episode on October 18, 2019. She subsequently performed at the series' joint concert titled "Some Days" and "Some Nights", which was held on January 18, 2020, at the Sangmyung Art Center in Hongji-dong, Jongno District.

=== 2020–present: Recent work ===
Sori made a cameo appearance as a jazz club singer in the fourth episode of OCN's action and science fiction television series Rugal, which premiered on April 5, 2020. She portrayed a fictionalized version of herself in Naver TV's romantic drama web series Almost Famous, which was based on her personal struggles. Prior to the development of the series, Sori quietly retired from the music industry without informing her company and fan base and was employed as a part-time barista, but she returned shortly after online petitions emerged that encouraged her to resume her career. Almost Famous premiered its first episode on July 7, 2020. She released a single titled "Melting Love" as a part of the series' original soundtrack on July 16, 2020. Sori subsequently announced the release of her fourth single the following month through her official YouTube channel on July 31, 2020. In conjunction with the announcement, she launched a Kickstarter project in order to fund the expenses of the single and would run until August 30, 2020. The project ultimately accumulated ¥2,313,597 from 313 backers. Sori posted a promotional photo for the single, which was revealed to be titled "Initial S", to her official Twitter account on August 20, 2020. The single was released on August 31, 2020, with an accompanying music video. It was directed by the film director Sohn Il-hyung. "Initial S" was composed and penned by Gamen Rider. Her first online fanmeet, and second overall, titled "SweetNotes" was held on September 26, 2020.

Sori contributed to the soundtrack of the reality web series YouTuLover with the single "Deja Vu" on May 20, 2021. She appeared in the final episode of TVN's fantasy and historical drama Bulgasal: Immortal Souls on February 6, 2022, during which she portrayed Min Sang-woon. Sori subsequently received a World Creator Award for her work as an influencer during its ceremony on February 23, 2022. She returned to Channel J as a cast member of its variety television show I Live in Korea, which premiered on April 30, 2022. Sori held a series of concerts at the Shinjuku Idol Stage in Kabukichō, Shinjuku from July 16, 2022, until July 24, 2022.

== Filmography ==
=== Television ===
Year	Title	Role	Notes
2014	Hi! School: Love On	High school student	Television debut
2017	The Idolmaster KR	Sori	Main role (24 episodes)
2017–2018	Mix Nine	Contestant	Mol Entertainment representative; 7th place
2019	Travel in Japan That Even Japanese Don't Know	Herself	Main cast member (season 4–5)
2019	Somebody	Herself	Main cast member (season 2)
2020	Rugal	Jazz club singer	Cameo role (Air date: April 5, 2020)
2022	Bulgasal: Immortal Souls	Min Sang-woon	Cameo role (Air date: February 6, 2022)
2022	I Live in Korea	Herself	Main cast member (13 episodes)

=== Web ===
Year	Title	Role	Notes
2019	Sori Action	Host	Fact in Star segment; 17 episodes
2020	Almost Famous	Lee So-ri	Lead role (16 episodes)
2026	Made in Korea	Hansol	Tamil language film by Netflix

=== Music videos ===
Year	Title	Other performer(s) credited	Director(s)	Ref.
2018	"Touch"	Basick	Hong Won-gi (Zanybros)	
2018	"I'm Ready"	Jaehyun	Kyotaro Hayashi	
2019	"I Am Not Alone"	Folded Dragons	Park Sang-won (Zanybros)	
2020	"Initial S"	None	Sohn Il-hyung	
2023	"Always"	Ra.D	Ra.D	

== Discography ==
=== Singles ===
Title	Year	Peak chart position		Album
Title	Year	KOR	JPN	Album
"To Myself" (잘했다 말해주고 싶어)	2017	—	*	Mix Nine Part 2
"Touch" (featuring Basick)	2018	49	—	Non-album singles
"I'm Ready" (featuring Jaehyun)	2018	—	126	Non-album singles
"I Am Not Alone" (with Folded Dragons)	2019	—	*	Non-album singles
"Melting Love" (사르르)	2020	—	*	Almost Famous (Original Television Soundtrack), Pt. 2
"Initial S" (이니셜S)	2020	—	*	Non-album single
"Deja Vu"	2021	—	*	YouTuLover OST, Part 2
"Always" (with Ra.D)	2023	—	*	Non-album single
"—" denotes releases that did not chart.
