= 2016 Mnet Asian Music Awards =

Asian music awards ceremony

- Date: December 2, 2016
- Location: AsiaWorld–Expo, Hong Kong
- Hosted by: Lee Byung-hun
- Most awards: Exo (3)
- Website: Mnet Asian Music Awards

Television/radio coverage
- Network: South Korea: Mnet (see complete list)
- Runtime: 120 minutes (Red Carpet); 240 minutes (Main event)

The 2016 Mnet Asian Music Awards ceremony, organized by CJ E&M through its music channel Mnet, took place at the AsiaWorld-Expo in Hong Kong. The ceremony was the seventh consecutive Mnet Asian Music Awards to be hosted outside of South Korea and the 18th ceremony in the show's history.

Nominees were announced on October 28, 2016, through the 2016 MAMA Nomination Special Live Broadcast aired on Mnet streamed nationally and globally. Leading the awards was Exo with 3.

== Background ==
MAMA 2016 was the eighteenth edition of the Mnet Asian Music Awards. It was simultaneously broadcast live in South Korea, Japan, the United States and Southeast Asia. In Sri Lanka and Thailand, it was made available to stream on Iflix 24 hours after its broadcast in South Korea. This marked the fifth consecutive time the event would take place in the same country and the fourth consecutive time to be held in the same venue.

However, MAMA 2016 has the lowest TV ratings since 2009 edition.

== Performers and presenters ==
2016 Mnet Asian Music Awards host

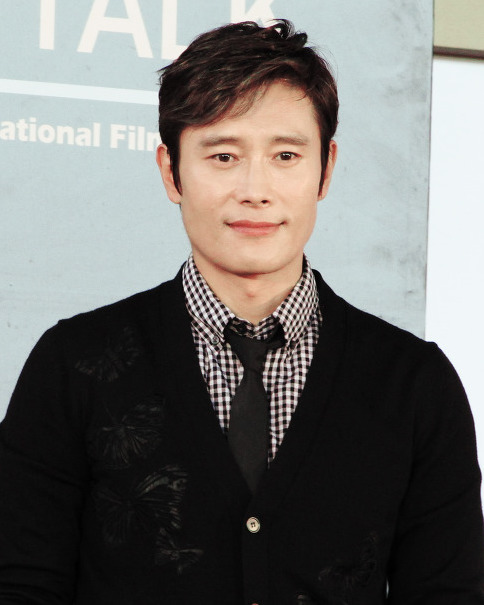
Lee Byung-hun

The following individuals and groups, listed in order of appearance, presented awards or performed musical numbers.

=== Performers ===
Artist(s)	Song(s)	Notes
Pre-show
NCT Dream	"Chewing Gum"	
SF9	"Fanfare"	
I.O.I	"Dream Girls"	
Main show
Lee Tae Kyung, Park Hye-ji, Park In-soo & J-Black	Intro	"We Are All Connected" (opening act)
NCT	Dance Connection + "Black On Black"	"We Are All Connected" (opening act)
Taemin	"Goodbye", "Soldier", "Guess Who"	"We Are All Connected" (opening act)
GFriend	"Rough", "Navillera", "Very Nice"	"Memories Of Springtime"
Seventeen	"Boom Boom", "Adore U", "Very Nice"	"Memories Of Springtime"
Gallant	"Weight in Gold"	"Soul Wave"
Baekhyun & Suzy	"Dream"	"Dream A Little Dream"
Dean	"D" (Half Moon)	"Bermuda: Last In Soul"
Crush	"Don't Forget"	"Bermuda: Last In Soul"
Zico	"Eureka", "Boys and Girls"	"Bermuda: Last In Soul"
Zico, Dean and Crush	"Bermuda Triangle"	"Bermuda: Last In Soul"
NCT 127	"Firetruck"	"Who's The Winner?"
Lee Joo-heon and Taeyong	Rap Battle	"Who's The Winner?"
Monsta X	"Fighter"	"Who's The Winner?"
Got7	"Hard Carry"	"Who's The Winner?"
Lee Juck and Ko Sang Ji	"Don't Worry"	"Don't Worry"
I.O.I	"Pick Me", "Very Very Very"	"Happy Music Factory"
Twice	"Cheer Up", "TT"	"Happy Music Factory"
Timbaland and Eric Nam	"Body"	"Time For Connection"
BTS	"Boy Meets Evil", "Blood Sweat & Tears", "Fire"	"Boy Meets Evil"
BewhY and Prepix	"Forever"	"Hello Universe"
Yiruma	"River Flows In You"	"Hello Universe"
Yoo Ah In, BewhY and Yiruma	"Day Day"	"Hello Universe"
Taeyeon (Note: Taeyeon was supposed to perform “See You Again” with Wiz Khalifa, but the performance was cancelled due to technical issue.)	"Rain"	"About Farewell"
Wiz Khalifa	"Young, Wild & Free", "See You Again"^{1}	"Hiphop Wizdom"
Exo	"Transformer", "Monster"	"The Sacrifice"

=== Presenters ===
- Moon Hee-joon, Shin A-young, Z.Hera – red carpet hosts
- Lee Byung-hun – main host
- Twice – presented Best New Artist (Female)
- Gong Myung, Park Ha-sun – presented Best New Artist (Male)
- Wang Tang Lu – introduced 'Memories of Springtime' performance
- Park Ki-woong, Choo Ja-hyun – presented Best Asian Style
- John H. Lee, Lee Ji-ah – presented Worldwide Favorite Artist
- Kwon Hyuk-soo – presented Best OST
- Lee Soo-hyuk, Kang Seung-hyun – presented Best Female Artist and Best Dance Performance (Male)
- Wang Ta Lu, Park Min-young – presented Worldwide Performer
- Han Ji-min – introduced 'Girls Education' campaign
- Ahn Jae-hyun, Shin Hye-sun – presented Best Vocal Performance (Male & Female)
- Seo Kang-joon, Emma Wu – presented Best Dance Performance (Solo) and Best Vocal Performance (Group)
- Park Seo-joon, Han Hyo-joo – presented Best Male Group and Best Female Group
- Jang Hyuk, Hwang Jung-eum – presented Best Collaboration and Best Rap Performance
- Park Bo-gum, Kim Yoo-jung – presented Best Male Artist and Best Dance Performance (Female)
- Quincy Jones – speech about theme
- Cha Seung-won – presented Song of the Year
- Ha Ji-won – presented Artist of the Year
- Leon Lai – presented Album of the Year

== Judging criteria ==
Eligible nominees included songs and/or albums released from October 31, 2015, until October 27 the next year. Winners would be selected based on six categories including online voting and evaluation from MAMA professional panel. (Note: Overseas categories and Professional categories have different criteria.)

Division	Online Voting	Research	MAMA Professional Panel (Local + Foreign)	Music Sales	Record Sales	MAMA Selection Committee
Artist of the Year Award Category by Artist*	20%	20%	20%	20%	10%	10%
Song of the Year Award Category by Genre**	10%	20%	20%	30%	10%	10%
Album of the Year	—	—	30%	—	50%	20%
Special Prize***	30%	—	50%	—	—	20%
*UnionPay Artist of the Year, Best New (M)ale/(F)emale Artist, Best M/F Artist, Best M/F Group (6 total); **UnionPay Song of the Year, Best Dance Performance (Solo/M/F Group), Best Vocal Performance (M/F/Group), Best Rap Performance, Best Band Performance, Best Collaboration (10 total); ***Best Music Video, Best OST (2 total)

== Winners and nominees ==
Winners are listed first and highlighted in boldface.

Following the announcement of the nominees on October 28, online voting opened on the official MAMA website via PC and mobile web. The voting ended on December 1, 2016.

Artist of the Year (Daesang)	Album of the Year (Daesang)
**BTS**; Exo; Twice; GFriend; Taeyeon	**Exo – Ex'Act**; Twice – Page Two; BTS – Wings; Seventeen – Love & Letter; Shinee – 1 of 1
Song of the Year (Daesang)	Best Music Video
**Twice – "Cheer Up"**; Exo – "Monster"; BTS – "Blood Sweat & Tears"; GFriend – "Rough"; Zico – "I Am You, You Are Me"	**Blackpink – "Whistle"**; Dean – "Bonnie & Clyde"; Gain – "Carnival (The Last Day)"; BTS – "Blood Sweat & Tears"; Wonder Girls – "Why So Lonely"
Best Male Artist	Best Female Artist
**Zico**; Park Hyo Shin; Psy; Im Chang-jung; Crush	**Taeyeon**; Baek A-yeon; Ailee; Lee Hi; Jung Eunji
Best Male Group	Best Female Group
**Exo**; iKon; BTS; Block B; Shinee; Infinite	**Twice**; Red Velvet; Mamamoo; GFriend; Wonder Girls
Best Dance Performance – Male Group	Best Dance Performance – Female Group
**BTS – "Blood Sweat & Tears"**; Exo – "Monster"; Got7 – "Hard Carry"; Monsta X – "All In"; VIXX – "Fantasy"; Seventeen – "Pretty U"	**GFriend – "Rough"**; AOA – "Good Luck"; Twice – "Cheer Up"; Red Velvet – "Russian Roulette"; Sistar – "I Like That"
Best Dance Performance – Solo	Best Collaboration
**Taemin – "Press Your Number"**; Luna – "Free Somebody"; Jun Hyoseong – "Find Me"; Tiffany – "I Just Wanna Dance"; HyunA – "How's This?"	**Suzy & Baekhyun – "Dream"**; MOBB (Mino & Bobby) – "HIT ME"; Park Kyung & Eunha – "Inferiority Complex"; BoA & Beenzino – "No Matter What"; Eric Nam & Wendy – "Spring Love"
Best Vocal Performance – Group	Best OST
**Davichi – "Beside Me"**; Mamamoo – "You're the Best"; Beast – "Ribbon"; BTOB – "Remember That"; Urban Zakapa – "I Don't Love You"	**Lee Juck – "Don't Worry" (Reply 1988)**; Gummy – "Moonlight Drawn by Clouds" (Love in the Moonlight); DAVICHI – "This Love" (Descendants of the Sun); Ben – "Like a Dream" (Another Miss Oh); Jang Beom June – "Reminiscence" (Signal)
Best Vocal Performance – Male Solo	Best Vocal Performance – Female Solo
**Crush – "Don't Forget" featuring Taeyeon**; Dean – "D (Half Moon)"; Eric Nam – "Good For You"; Im Chang-jung – "The Love That I Committed"; Jang Beom June – "Fallen in Love (Only with You)"	**Ailee – "If You"**; Baek A-yeon – "So-So"; Baek Yerin – "Across The Universe"; Jung Eunji – "Hopefully Sky"; Taeyeon – "Rain"
Best Band Performance	Best Rap Performance
**CNBLUE – "You're So Fine"**; 10cm – "What The Spring??"; DAY6 – "Letting Go"; FTISLAND – "Take Me Now"; Guckkasten – "Pulse"	**C Jamm & BewhY – "Puzzle"**; Gary – "Lonely Night"; DOK2 – "1llusion"; San E & Mad Clown – "Sour Grapes"; Zico – "I Am You, You Are Me"
Best New Artist – Male	Best New Artist – Female
**NCT 127**; SF9; Astro; KNK; Pentagon	**I.O.I**; Blackpink; Gugudan; Bolbbalgan4; Cosmic Girls

=== Special Awards ===
- World Performer Award: **Seventeen**
- iQIYI Worldwide Favourite Artist: **Got7**
- Best of Next Male Artist Award: **Monsta X**
- Best of Next Female Artist Award: **Blackpink**
- Best Producer: **Black Eyed Pilseung**
- Best Visual & Art Director: **Min Hee-jin**
- Best Choreographer: **J.Da Apissara Phetruengrong**
- Best Promoter: **Masahiro Hikada**
- Best Executive Producer: **Bang Si Hyuk**
- Best International Producer: **Timbaland**
- Best Engineer: **Tanaka Hironobu**
- Inspired Achievement: **Quincy Jones**
- Best Asian Style: **Exo**
- Best Asian Artist: **Getsunova**; **Noo Phuoc Thinh**; **Isyana Sarasvati**; **JJ Lin**; **Sekai no Owari**; **Hua Chenyu**

=== Multiple nominations ===
The following artist(s) received two or more nominations (excluding the special awards):

Nominations	Artist(s)
6
6	Exo
6	BTS
5
5	Twice
4	GFriend
4	Taeyeon
4	Zico
2	Ailee
2	Baek A-yeon
2	Blackpink
2	Crush
2	Davichi
2	Dean
2	Eric Nam
2	Im Chang-jung
2	Jang Beom June
2	Jung Eun-ji
2	Mamamoo
2	Red Velvet
2	Wonder Girls

== Network ==
Country	Network
South Korea	Mnet, OnStyle, O'live, XTM
Japan	Mnet Japan, Mnet Smart, Yahoo Gyao
United States	Mnet America, Kcon.tv
Southeast Asia	tvN Asia
Taiwan	tvN Asia, MTV Mandarin, KKTV
Thailand	Iflix
Sri Lanka	Iflix
Malaysia	Tonton
France	Dramapassion
Indonesia	Indosiar, Vidio
Philippines	Myx
Cambodia	MyTV
Hong Kong	tvN Asia, ViuTV
