= Me gustas tú =

Me gustas tú (English: I like you) may refer to:

- "Me Gustas Tú" (Manu Chao song), a 2001 single by Manu Chao from the album Próxima Estación: Esperanza
- "Me Gustas Tú", a 2010 single by J Balvin from the mixtape J Balvin Mix Tape
- "Me Gustas Tu" (GFriend song), a 2015 single by GFriend from the EP Flower Bud
