= Season of Glass (EP) =

EP by GFriend
- Released: January 15, 2015
- Genres: K-pop; bubblegum pop; dance pop
- Length: 14:55
- Labels: Source Music; KT Music

GFriend chronology
Season of Glass (2015)	Flower Bud (2015)

Singles from Season of Glass
- 1. "Glass Bead" Released: January 15, 2015

Season of Glass is the debut extended play (EP) by South Korean girl group GFriend. It was released by Source Music on January 15, 2015, and distributed by KT Music. The album contains three songs, including the single "Glass Bead", and two instrumental tracks. The album peaked at number nine on the Gaon Album Chart and has sold over 10,000 units. GFriend promoted the album with a series of televised live performances on South Korea's music shows. Their debut was often compared to Girls' Generation's debut, with the music and choreography of "Glass Bead" being reminiscent of "Into the New World".

== Release and promotion ==
In November 2014, Source Music announced the upcoming debut of their first girl group, named GFriend. On January 5, the whole group was unveiled and their album release date was announced. GFriend's debut EP (also called a mini album) was released as a digital download on January 15, and was released in CD format the next day. The music video for lead single "Glass Bead" was produced by Zanybros and directed by Hong Won-ki. GFriend was designed to target a teenage audience, and the music video is set in various school locations, including a classroom and gym. "Glass Bead" is the first song in the group's "school series" and represents the start of school semester and enjoying time with friends.

GFriend promoted the album with performances of "Glass Bead" on various music shows, starting with Music Bank on January 16. They presented an "innocent and youthful" image, wearing cheerleader-inspired outfits with simple hairstyles and minimal makeup. In contrast to their appearance, the group's choreography was described as "powerful" and "energetic".

== Production and composition ==
The album's intro track, "Glass Bead", and "White" were written by Iggy and Seo Yong-bae, who had previously written songs such as Ailee's "Heaven" and Orange Caramel's "Catallena". Seo is an in-house producer at Rainbow Bridge World. "Neverland" was composed by Yoon Woo-seok of ZigZag Note and Kang Myeong-shin, with lyrics by Kim Seo-jun and Kim Yong-hwan (Eden Beatz).

"Glass Bead" is bubblegum pop dance song, with a "magnificent string sound, powerful beat, and emotional and flowing melody". The lyrics are from the perspective of a teenage girl, who says she will not easily break despite seeming fragile like a glass bead, and will shine for the one she loves. Originally, a different, "softer", song was set to be the album's single. When GFriend's manager played "Glass Bead" for the group, they all instantly liked it. Sowon said it "gives the feel of running around at the gym, which I thought matched us better". Although the song was often compared to Girls' Generation's "Into the New World", it reminded the group of Fin.K.L and S.E.S., Korean girl groups from the late 1990s and early 2000s. "Neverland" is a dance song with "powerful" synths and guitars, featuring vocal harmony in the chorus, and "White" is a medium-tempo dance song reminiscent of the 1990s.

== Reception ==
The album entered the weekly Gaon Album Chart at number twelve, and peaked at number nine in the second week of February. It was the 38th best selling album during the month of January, selling 1,146 physical copies. As of June 2016, it has sold a total of 11,640 units. "Glass Bead" entered the Gaon Digital Chart at number 89 and peaked at number 25 the following week. The song's music video was the ninth most viewed K-pop music video globally during the month of January.

At the end of January, GFriend was included in Billboard's list of "Top 5 K-Pop Artists to Watch in 2015". Jeff Benjamin said that GFriend, along with fellow rookie girl group Lovelyz, was "leading a new wave of female acts with a classic innocent look", in contrast to the popular "sexy" trend of 2014. He said the "sweet sound" and "non-stop" choreography of "Glass Bead" brought "undeniable nostalgia" for Girl's Generation's debut single, "Into the New World". Writing for Fuse, he said GFriend was "arguably the most successful" innocent girl group and called "Glass Bead" a "nostalgic gem". He concluded that the group needed to create a unique identity for themselves, or "risk being nothing but a [Girl's Generation] tribute act".

== Track listing ==
No.	Title	Lyrics	Music	Arrangement	Length
1.	"Season of Glass" (Intro)		Iggy; Seo Yong-bae	Iggy; Seo	1:13
2.	"Glass Bead" (Korean: 유리구슬; RR: Yuriguseul)	Iggy; Seo	Iggy; Seo	Iggy; Seo	3:23
3.	"Neverland"	Eden Beatz	ZigZag Note; Kang Myeong-shin	ZigZag Note; Kang	3:11
4.	"White" (Korean: 하얀마음; RR: Hayan maeum; lit. '"White Heart"')	Iggy; Seo	Iggy; Seo	Iggy; Seo	3:45
5.	"Glass Bead" (Instrumental)		Iggy; Seo	Iggy; Seo	3:23
Total length:					14:55

== Personnel ==
Credits adapted from album liner notes.

Locations

- Recorded at K-Note Studio
- Recorded at Hong Sound (track 2)
- Recorded at Big Hit Studio (track 2)
- Mixed at Cube Studio
- Mastered at Suono Mastering

Personnel

- GFriend - backing vocals (tracks 2–5)
- Seo Yong-bae - drum programming (tracks 1–2, 5)
- Iggy - piano (tracks 1–2, 5), electric piano (track 4), synthesizer (tracks 1–2, 4–5)
- Kwon Seok-hong - string arrangement (tracks 2, 5)
- Kim So-ri - backing vocals (tracks 2–5)
- Jung Jae-pil - guitar (tracks 2–3, 5)
- Yoong strings - strings (tracks 2, 5)
- Kim Gi-wook - bass (track 3)
- No Eun-jong - guitar (track 3)

== Charts ==
Chart	Peak position
South Korean Albums (Gaon)	9

== Sales ==
Country	Sales amount
South Korea	11,640

== See also ==
- Season of Glass at Discogs
