= Snowflake (EP) =

EP by GFriend
- Released: January 25, 2016
- Genre: K-pop
- Length: 21:42
- Label: Source Music; LOEN Entertainment

GFriend chronology
Flower Bud (2015)	Snowflake (2016)	LOL (2016)

Singles from Snowflake
- 1. "Rough" Released: January 25, 2016

Snowflake is the third extended play (EP) by South Korean girl group GFriend. It was released by Source Music on January 25, 2016 and distributed by LOEN Entertainment. The album contains five songs, including the single "Rough", and two instrumental tracks. The album debuted at number two on the Gaon Album Chart and has sold more than 33,000 units. GFriend promoted the album with a series of televised live performances on South Korea's music shows, winning a total of 15 music show awards. "Rough" was also commercially successful, topping the Gaon Digital Chart and selling more than one million digital downloads. Musically, the album is similar in style to K-pop from the late 1990s and 2000s.

== Release and promotion ==
GFriend's third EP was much-anticipated after the group won Rookie of the Year at the Golden Disk Awards and Best New Female Artist at the MelOn Music Awards for their hit singles "Glass Bead" and "Me Gustas Tu". The album's title, Snowflake, and track list were revealed on January 14, 2016. It was released on January 25, in both CD and digital formats. The lead single, "Rough", is the final song in the group's "school series" and represents the end of a school year. They maintained their "powerful-innocent" concept, wearing school uniforms and showcasing "perfectly synchronized fierce and powerful" dance choreography. The accompanying music video for "Rough" was inspired by the anime film The Girl Who Leapt Through Time. It was produced by Zanybros and directed by Hong Won-ki.

Hours after the album's release, the group held a showcase at AX Korea in Gwangjin-gu, Seoul, which was broadcast live via Naver's V app. They performed songs from the album for the first time at the showcase. The group then promoted the album with performances of "Rough" on various music shows, starting with SBS MTV's The Show on January 26. In their second week of promotion, the song won first place on every music show with a chart system. By February 28, "Rough" had won a total of 15 music show trophies, including "triple crowns" on M! Countdown, Music Bank, Show Champion, and Inkigayo. With these wins, GFriend is in second place for number of wins by a girl group for a single song, behind Apink's 17 wins for "Luv".

== Composition ==
The album opens with a dramatic intro track, "Snowflake". The lead single, "Rough", is a dance song described as "lyrical, catchy, and melodic" with "powerful beats and emotional lyrics". Its Korean title literally translates to "Running Through Time", and the lyrics are about a girl's desire to "run through time and grow up" so she can be with the one she loves. "Say My Name" features drums, acoustic guitar, and synthesizer riffs. "Luv Star" is a medium-tempo dance song with string instrumentation and "Someday" was described as an "energetic cheer song". "Trust" is a medium-tempo pop ballad that portrays the love story of a "shy but serious girl". "Rough" and "Say My Name" were written by Iggy and Seo Yong-bae, who also wrote both of GFriend's previous singles. Seo is an in-house producer at Rainbow Bridge World.

== Reception ==
The album entered the weekly Gaon Album Chart at number two, selling 11,165 physical copies in one week. It was also number ten on the Billboard World Albums chart. As of June 2016, it has sold more than 33,000 copies. All five songs from the album charted on the Gaon Digital Chart, with "Rough" peaking at number one the third week of release. "Rough" has sold more than 1.2 million digital downloads as of May 2016. During the month of January, the music video for "Rough" was the third most watched K-pop music video globally.

Won Ho-jung of The Korea Herald said the album's musical style is similar to K-pop from the late 1990s and 2000s, and can appeal to fans who still want the "old-style feel" of classic Korean pop idol groups. Won described "Rough" and "Say My Name" as powerful and dramatic, and "Luv Star" and "Someday" as adorable and "sugary sweet". Won called GFriend's vocals "on point" and noted that the members were able to adeptly switch between "powerful, soaring voices" and "cutesy, nasal voices" for the two types of songs. Overall, Won said the album "demonstrates GFriend's potential to move beyond the cliché schoolgirl concept and do something interesting of their own, bringing classic girl groups to 21st-century K-pop."

== Track listing ==
No.	Title	Lyrics	Music	Arrangement	Length
1.	"Snowflake" (Intro)		Hong Beom-gyu; Kim Woong	Hong; Kim	1:16
2.	"Rough" (Korean: 시간을 달려서; RR: Siganeul dallyeoseo; lit. '"Running Through Time"')	Iggy; Seo Yong-bae	Iggy; Seo	Iggy; Seo	3:29
3.	"Say My Name" (내 이름을 불러줘; Nae ireumeul bulleojwo)	Iggy; Seo	Iggy; Seo	Iggy; Seo	3:08
4.	"Luv Star" (사랑별; Sarangbyeol)	E.ONE	E.ONE	E.ONE; Jo Jae-seok	3:08
5.	"Someday" (그런 날엔; Geureon naren)	Heuk Tae	Heuk Tae; Jun Ta; Park Chan	Heuk Tae; Park Chan	3:37
6.	"Trust"	No Ju-hwan	No; Lee Won-jong	No; Lee	3:35
7.	"Rough" (Instrumental)		Iggy; Seo	Iggy; Seo	3:29
Total length:					21:42

== Charts ==
=== Weekly charts ===
Chart (2016)	Peak position
South Korean Albums (Gaon)	2
US World Albums (Billboard)	10

=== Monthly charts ===
Chart (2016)	Peak position
South Korean Albums (Gaon)	7

=== Year-end charts ===
Chart (2016)	Position
South Korean Albums (Gaon)	76

== Sales ==
Country	Sales amount
South Korea	37,744
