= LOL (GFriend album) =

- Digital and Laughing Out Loud version cover

Studio album by GFriend
- Released: July 11, 2016
- Studio: Vibe Studio
- Genre: K-pop
- Length: 39:16
- Labels: Source Music; LOEN Entertainment

GFriend chronology
Snowflake (2016)	LOL (2016)	The Awakening (2017)

Singles from LOL
- 1. "Navillera" Released: July 11, 2016

LOL is the debut studio album by South Korean girl group GFriend. It was released by Source Music on July 11, 2016, distributed by LOEN Entertainment. The album contains ten songs, including the single "Navillera", and two instrumental tracks. It has a retro musical style with a diverse range of genres, including pop, rock, reggae, R&B, and house.

== Release and promotion ==
LOL is GFriend's first studio album, released eighteen months after their debut. It follows their three successful extended plays that comprise their "school series" trilogy. It was released at midnight on July 11, 2016, in two versions: "Laughing Out Loud" and "Lots of Love". That same day, GFriend held two showcases in Seoul, where they performed songs from the album. The media showcase was held at Yes24 Live Hall in Gwangjin-gu, and the showcase for fans was broadcast live via Naver's V app. The group then promoted the album on music shows, starting with SBS MTV's The Show on July 12, where they performed "Navillera" and "Gone with the Wind". In the second week of promotion, GFriend won all five music show awards, on The Show, Show Champion, M! Countdown, Music Bank, and Inkigayo. They won a total of 14 music show awards, including triple crowns (three consecutive wins) on The Show, M! Countdown, and Inkigayo.

They promoted the album with the showcase tour The L.O.L Asia showcase, started on July 10, 2016, in Yes24 Live Hall, Seoul, South Korea, ended in Taipei International Convention Center, Taipei, Taiwan on October 1, 2016.

== Composition ==
The album has a retro musical style, with a more diverse range of genres compared to GFriend's past releases, in order to appeal to a wider audience. The title is an acronym for both "Laughing Out Loud" and "Lots of Love", which represents the dual concept of "playful and bubbly" and "feminine and graceful" songs. "Navillera" is a pop-rock song with a guitar solo, written by Iggy and Seo Yong-bae, who wrote the group's previous three singles. "Navillera" (나빌레라) is a reference to Cho Chi-hun's poem "The Nun's Dance" (승무), and is a phrase used to describe a fluttering action similar to the movement of a butterfly. The song's lyrics describe a girl's feeling of wanting to fly like a butterfly to be with the person she loves.

"Distance" is the group's first attempt at reggae, and features piano, guitar, and harmonica. "Water Flower" is a rock song with drum sounds and guitar distortion effects, and "Mermaid" is a pop ballad written by Source Music's group Mio, inspired by the fairy tale "The Little Mermaid". "Sunshine" is an R&B song with electronic rhythm and acoustic piano harmony, while "Compas" is in the house music genre. "Click" is a medium-tempo pop song produced by Hyuk Shin, and is in the style of 1990s American pop music. "Gone with the Wind" is the group's first dubstep song.

== Reception ==
Miriam Steglich of the Korea JoongAng Daily described the album as "express[ing] the heart and feeling of a young girl", with songs ranging from "bright and energetic" to "soothing and relaxing". She said the diversity of genre and unique instrumentation was impressive, and identified "Navillera" as the album's standout track. However, she regretted that it was not "much of a departure from their last, leaving room for improvement and expectations for their next effort."

The album was a commercial success in South Korea. It was the fourth best-selling physical release during the month of July 2016, selling 40,680 units. It entered the Gaon Album Chart at number three, while "Navillera" topped the Gaon Digital Chart. "LOL", "Mermaid", and "Gone with the Wind" also charted in the top 100, at numbers 80, 83, and 87, respectively. In the United States, LOL charted at number seven on the Billboard World Albums chart, while "Navillera" was number 12 on the World Digital Songs chart.

== Track listing ==
No.	Title	Lyrics	Music	Arrangement	Length
1.	"Intro"		Jo In-ho; Kim Woong (Note: Oreo is a production team composed of Iggy (Lim Soo-ho), C-no and Kim Woong. "Intro", "Fall in Love", and "Water Flower" are credited under Oreo.)	Jo; Kim Woong	1:06
2.	"Fall in Love" (물들어요; Muldeureoyo, lit. "Dyed")	Hong Beom-gyu; Jo; Kim Woong	Hong; Jo; Kim Woong	Hong; Kim Woong	3:18
3.	"Navillera" (너 그리고 나; Neo Geurigo Na, lit. "You and I")	Iggy (Note: Iggy (birth name Lim Soo-ho) is a member of production teams Oreo and Iggy & Yongbae.); Seo Yong-bae (Note: Seo Yong-bae is a member of production teams Kamen Rider and Iggy & Yongbae.)	Iggy; Seo	Iggy; Seo	3:14
4.	"LOL"	Kim Eana	Master Key; Phat Music; Score	Master Key; Phat Music; Score	3:30
5.	"Distance" (한 뼘; Han Ppyeom)	Iggy; Seo	Iggy; Seo	Iggy; Seo	3:37
6.	"Water Flower" (물꽃놀이; Mulkkonnori)	Hong; Kim Woong; Iggy	Hong; Kim Woong; Iggy	Hong; Kim Woong	3:41
7.	"Mermaid"	Mio (Note: Mio is a vocal group signed with Source Music, composed of Lee Jung-wook, Yoo Saeng-hwan, and Jang Jung-woo.)	Mio	Mio	3:27
8.	"Sunshine" (나의 일기장; Naui Ilgijang, lit. "My Diary")	E.ONE (Note: E.ONE (also written as e.one) is a music production team composed of Choi Hyun-joon (V.O.S) and Jung Ho-hyun.)	E.ONE	E.ONE	3:31
9.	"Compass" (나침반; Nachimban)	Kim Jung-yoon (ZigZag Note); Oh Ji-hoon (Note: Credited under the group name Retro Funkee); Choi Hyun-joon	Kim Jung-yoon; Oh; Choi	Kim Jung-yoon; Oh; Choi	3:30
10.	"Click" (찰칵; Chalkak)	Mafly; Hyuk Shin	MRey; DK	Shin; MRey	3:18
11.	"Gone with the Wind" (바람에 날려; Barame Nallyeo)	E.ONE	E.ONE	E.ONE	3:50
12.	"Navillera" (Instrumental)		Iggy; Seo	Iggy; Seo	3:14
Total length:					39:16

== Personnel ==
Credits adapted from the album liner notes.

Locations

- Recorded at Vibe Studio (tracks 2–11)
- Mixed at Cube Studio (tracks 1–3, 5–6, 8, 11–12)
- Mixed at MasterPiece SoundLab (track 4)
- Mixed at Vibe Studio (track 7)
- Mixed at W Studio (track 9)
- Mixed at Joombas Factory USA (track 10)

Personnel

- GFriend – vocals
- Kwak Jung-shin – recording engineer (tracks 2–11), mixing engineer (track 7)
- Jung Mo-yeon – recording engineer (tracks 2–11)
- Oreo – all instruments (track 1)
- Young – guitar (tracks 1–3, 5–7, 12)
- Jo-ssi Ajeossi – mixing engineer (tracks 1–3, 6, 8, 11–12)
- Hong Beom-gyu – drum programming (tracks 2, 6), guitar (track 6)
- Kim Woong – piano, synthesizer (tracks 2, 6)
- Kim So-ri – background vocals (tracks 2–7, 9–10)
- Kwon Seok-hong – string arrangement (tracks 2–3, 7, 11–12)
- Yoong String – strings (tracks 2–3, 7, 11–12)
- Seo Yong-bae – drum programming (tracks 3, 5, 12)
- Iggy – keyboard, synthesizer (tracks 3, 5, 12)
- Master Key – mixing engineer, drum programming, keyboard, synthesizer (track 4)
- Score – drum programming, piano (track 4)
- Lee Tae-wook – guitar (track 4)
- Im Jin-cheol – harmonica (track 5)
- Shin Jae-bin – mixing engineer (track 5)
- Kim Ye-il – bass guitar (track 6)
- Mio – all instruments (track 7)
- Choi Hoon – bass guitar (track 7)
- Jung Ho-hyun – all instruments (tracks 8, 11)
- EJ Show – keyboard (track 8)
- Geum Jo – background vocals (tracks 8, 11)
- Oh Ji-hoon – drum programming (track 9)
- No Eun-jong – guitar (track 9)
- Kim Jung-yoon – synthesizer (track 9)
- Jo Joon-sung – mixing engineer (track 9)
- Maxx Song – recording director (track 10)
- MRey – mixing engineer (track 10)
- Jung Soo-wan – guitar (track 11)
- Ho Hyun – keyboard (track 11)

== Charts ==
=== Weekly charts ===
Chart	Peak position
South Korean Albums (Gaon)	3
US World Albums (Billboard)	7

=== Year-end charts ===
Chart	Peak position
South Korean Albums (Gaon)	45
