= Zanybros =

South Korean video production company

- Industry: Multimedia entertainment
- Genre: Video production, recording label
- Founded: 2002; 24 years ago
- Founder: Hong Won-ki; Kim Jun-hong
- Headquarters: Seoul, South Korea
- Subsidiaries: ZB Label
- Website: zanybros.com

Zanybros (Korean: 쟈니브로스, stylized as ZANYBROS) is a South Korean video production company specializing in music video and commercial film production.

Zanybros was founded in 2002 by director Hong Won-ki and videographer Kim Jun-hong and has evolved to be one of the most influential music video companies of the Korean Wave. Zanybros also includes the subsidiary companies Astro Digital Lab, a post production company, the specialised camera team Roll Cam and the lighting company Strobe. They have worked with indie bands as well as entertainment agencies such as S.M. Entertainment and JYP Entertainment.

Among the work of Zanybros are some of the highest budget productions in the Korean music video industry, including Seo Taiji's "Moai" and B.A.P's "One Shot"

In 2020, Zanybros and director Hong Won-ki produced their first web series, Goedam, together with Megabox Plus M. The series was acquired by Netflix.

== ZB Label ==
The company's newest subsidiary, a recording company, ZB Label, released a debut music video, "Bomb", on October 20, 2019, for their first artist, Korean-American Alex Christine, also known as AleXa. AleXa left the label following the conclusion of her contract in 2025.

On September 10, 2021, Zanybros co-founder Hong Won-ki and his band MilkTz (밀크티즈) released their debut album MilkTz the 197x under ZB Label and Warner Music Korea.

ZB Label's chief executive officer is Kim Jun-hong, the other co-founder of Zanybros.

== Music videos (selection) ==
=== 2025 ===
- Gyubin - "Like U 100"

=== 2024 ===
- 8Turn - "Like a Friend"
- AleXa - "Sick"
- Be'O - "Criminal"
- Blackswan - "Roll Up"
- Bolbbalgan4 - "Lips"
- Boy Story - "Alpha"
- DKZ - "Like a Movie"
- Gyubin - "Really Like You", "Satellite"
- ILY:1 - "Firework"
- Juniel - "Bye"
- Lee DongYeol - "Drip Drop"
- MIRAE - "Running"
- Moonbyul - "Think About"
- NuNew X Paul Kim - "Blooming Just For You"
- Oneus - "Now"
- Primrose - "Freyja"
- Rothy - "Happy Ebd"
- Sevenus - "Want You Back", 'Pretty Good"
- Solar - "Colors"
- TIOT - "Rock Thang"
- Waker - Atlantis

=== 2023 ===
- AleXa - "Juliet"
- Alice - "Show Down"
- Bang Ye-dam - "Only One", "Miss You"
- Bella - "Juice"
- Billlie- "Dang! (hocus pocus)"
- Blackswan - "Karma", "Cat & Mouse"
- EL7Z UP - "Cheeky"
- Fifty Fifty - "Cupid"
- Golden Child - "Feel Me"
- Ghost9 - "Ruckus"
- ILY:1 - "Twinkle Twinkle", "My Color"
- Jang Min-ho - "Swish"
- Just B X AleXa - "MBTI"
- Kim Jae-hwan - "Spring Breeze"
- Kingdom - "Dystopia", "Coup d'Eat"
- LE'V - "A.I.BAE"
- Mamamoo+ - "GGBB", "dangdang"
- MIRAE - "Jump!"
- Nell - "Crack the Code"
- Nine to Six - "Don't Call Me"
- Onewe - "Gravity"
- Park Jae-chan - "Hello", "Time", "Oh Girl"
- Park Ji-hoon - "Blank Effect"
- Pixy - "Karma"
- Purple Kiss - "Sweet Juice", "7Heaven"
- Rocket Punch - "Boom"
- Rothy - "Something Casual", "No Where, Now Here"
- Secret Number - "Doxa"
- Sevenus - "Wonderland"
- Shownu - "Let's GGo!"
- SNH48 - "Lovely Echo", "Number One"
- Winter x Liz x Soyeon- "Nobody"
- Xikers - "Run"
- Yesung - "Floral Sense"

=== 2022 ===
- &Team - "Scent of You"
- AleXa - "Tattoo", "Wonderland", "Back in Vogue"
- Alice - "Dance On"
- Billlie - "GingaMingaYo (The Strange World)", "Patbingsu", "Ring Ma Bell"
- DAVII - "Flying"
- DKB - "24/7"
- DKZ - "Uh-Heung"
- E'Last - "Creature"
- Golden Child - "A Woo", "Rata Tat Tat"
- Ghost9 - "X-Ray"
- Ha Sung-woon - "Can't Live Without You"
- Hwayeon - "Blossom"
- Ichillin' - "Play Hide & Seek"
- ILY:1 - "Love in Bloom", "Que Sera Sera"
- Justhis - "Are We Done"
- Kara - "When I Move"
- KARD - "Ring The Alarm"
- Kassy - "Don't Wanna Leave Tonight"
- Kim Chaewon - "Tomorrow"
- Kingdom - "Ascension", "Promise", "Long Live The King"
- Kwon Eun-bi - "Light"
- Lee Seung Yoon - "Upon A Smile"
- Lim Young-woong - "London Boy"
- Loona - "Flip That"
- MAMAMOO - "Illella", "1,2,3 Eoi!'"
- MIRAE - "Marvelous", "Drip N' Drop", "Snow Prince"
- Moonbyul - "Lunatic", "Ddu Ddu Ddu"
- Oneus - "Bring It On", "Trickster", "Same Scent"
- Onewe - "Roommate", "Montage", "Still Here"
- Park Ji-hoon - "Moon&Back", "Nitro"
- Purple Kiss - "memeM", "Pretty Psycho", "Nerdy", "Geekyland"
- Secret Number - "Doomchita", "Tap"
- Shinwha WDJ - "Flash"
- Solar - "Honey"
- Song Soowoo - "Love Me or Hate Me"
- Soyou - "Dolls"
- Super Junior - "Mango"
- The Boyz - "Echo"
- WEi - "Spray"

=== 2021 ===
- Ahn Yeeun - "Sailing"
- AleXa - "Never Let You Go", "Xtra"
- Ateez - "Dreamers"
- Billlie - "Snowy Night"
- Blackswan - "Close To Me"
- Checkmate - "You"
- Daedo & AleXa - "Summer Breeze"
- Drippin - "Free Pass"
- G-Reyish - "Blood Night"
- Ghost9 - "Seoul", "Up All Night", "Control"
- Golden Child - "Burn It", "Breathe", "Ra Pam Pam"
- Ha Sung-woon - "Electrified"
- Hot Issue - "Icons"
- Hi-L - "Too Too"
- Kim Jae-hwan - "Unforgettable"
- Kim Sung-kyu - "Hush"
- Kingdom - "Excalibur", "Black Crown"
- Lapoem - "Sunshine"
- Lee Hong-gi - "Found Me"
- MIRAE - "Splash"
- Moonbyul - "G999"
- NADA - "Spicy"
- Nell - "Beautiful Jeopardy"
- Oneus - "Devil is in the detail", "No Diggity", "Black Mirror", "Thriller"
- Onewe - "Rain To Be", "Veronica", "Aurora", "Star"
- Onewe, Oneus - "Stay"
- Park Ji-hoon - "Serious"
- Pink Fantasy - "Poison"
- Purple Kiss - "Can We Talk Again", "Ponzona", "Zombie", "Cast Pearls Before Swine", "My My"
- Rocket Punch - "Ring Ring"
- T-ara - "Tiki Taka"
- 3YE x B.I.G (Triple7)- "Presente"
- WEi - "All or Nothing", "Bye Bye Bye"
- Woosung - "Dimples"

=== 2020 ===
- 1TEAM - "Ullaeli Kkollaeli"
- 1THE9 - "Bad Guy"
- AleXa - "Revolution", "Villain", "Do or Die"
- April - "Now or Never"
- Ateez - "The Black Cat Nero"
- Ben - "Bad"
- Botopass- "Flamingo"
- Blackswan - "Tonight"
- Bolbbalgan4 - "Leo", "Hug", "Dancing Cartoon", "Red Lipstick"
- Checkmate - "Drum"
- Chungha feat. PH-1 - "My Friend"
- Dahye - "Bad Blood"
- DAVII - "Jamie Cullum"
- DIA - "Hug U"
- DreamNote - "Wish"
- ENOi - "Cheeky", "W.A.Y"
- Fanatics - "Vavi Girl"
- (G)I-DLE - "Oh My God (Japanese Ver.)"
- Giriboy - "Just Kidding"
- Glay and Pentagon - "I'm Loving You"
- Golden Child - "Without You", "ONE (Lucid Dream)", "Pump It Up"
- Ghost9 - "Think of Dawn", "W.All"
- IZ - "Say Yes"
- H&D - "Soul", "Unfamiliar", "Good Night"
- JBJ95 - "Jasmine"
- Kard - "Red Moon", "Gunshot"
- Kim Sung-kyu - "I'm Cold"
- Kim Yo-han - "No More"
- Lovelyz - "Obliviate"
- MAMAMOO - "Wanna Be Myself", "Dingga", "Aya", "Travel"
- Moonbyul - "Eclipse", "Absence", "A Miracle 3days ago"
- Oneus - "A Song Written Easily", "Come Back Home", "To Be or Not to Be", "Bbusyeo"
- Onewe - "Q", "End of Spring", "Parting", "A Book in Memory"
- Peakboy - "Diet (Feat. Wheein)"
- Pentagon - "Dr. Bebe"
- Pink Fantasy - "Shadow Play"
- Purple Kiss - "My Heart Skip a Beat"
- Refund Sisters - "Don't Touch Me"
- Rolling Quartz - "Blaze"
- Rothy - "Ocean View"
- Rocket Punch - "Bouncy"
- Ryu Su-jeong - "Tiger Eyes"
- Saturday – "D.B.D.B.DIB"
- Secret Number - "Who Dis?", "Got That Boom"
- Solar - "Spit It Out"
- Super Junior - "2YA2YAO!"
- T1419 - "Dracula", "Row"
- UNVS - "Give You Up"
- WEi - "Twilight"
- WJSN Chocome - "Hmph!"
- XUM - "Ddalala"

=== 2019 ===
- 100% - "Still Loving You"
- 1THE9 - "XIX", "Blah"
- Ailee - "Room Shaker"
- AleXa - "Bomb"
- Ateez - "Hala Hala", "Aurora"
- Bolbbalgan4 - "25", "Workaholic"
- CLC - "ME (美)", "Devil"
- DIA - "Woowa"
- Dreamcatcher - "PIRI"
- Eunha, Ravi - "Blossom"
- Fanatics - "Sunday"
- Favorite - "Loca"
- fishingirls - "Enamoured"
- Fly to the Sky - "Thank You for Being Part of My Life"
- F.T. Island - "God Bless You"
- GFriend - "Fallin' Light (天使の梯子)", "Fever", "Flower"
- (G)I-DLE - "Latata (Crash Diamond Eyes ver.)", "Senorita"
- Giriboy - "party is over"
- Golden Child - "Wannabe"
- Henry Prince Mak - "Go Away"
- Honey Popcorn - "De-aeseohsta"
- Huta - "With Melody"
- Hwasa - "Twit"
- IN2IT - "Run Away", "ULlala: Poisoning"
- IZ - "Memento"
- KARD - "Bomb Bomb", "Dumb Litty"
- Kei - "I Go"
- Kim Dong-han - "Focus"
- Kim Jae-hwan - "Begin Again"
- Ladies' Code - "Feedback", "Set Me Free"
- Limitless - "Dream Play"
- MAMAMOO - "gogobebe", "HIP"
- Meng Meiqi - "Jiang"
- Nature - "Dream About U"
- N.Flying - "Rooftop"
- Oneus - "Valkyrie", "Twilight", "LIT"
- Onewe - "Reminisce about All", "Ring on my Ears", "0&4", "Regulus"
- Ong Seong-wu - "Heart Sign"
- Park Ji-hoon - "L.O.V.E"
- Peniel - "Flip (feat. Beenzino)", "Fly23"
- Pentagon - "COSMO", "Happiness", "Humph!", "Sha La La (Japanese Ver.)"
- Rocket Punch - "Bim Bam Bum"
- Rockit girl - "little cat"
- Rothy - "Blossom Flower"
- SF9 - "Enough", "RPM (Japanese Ver.)"
- S.I.S - "Always Be Your Girl"
- Sonamoo - "We Are Legendary"
- Song Ga-in - "Mom Arirang"
- Sori and Folded Dragons - "I Am Not Alone"
- TARGET - "Beautiful"
- Teen Top - "Run Away"
- The Boyz - "D.D.D"
- TRCNG - "Missing"
- UHSN - "Popsicle"
- UNINE - "Bomba"
- Vibe - "A Sad Song"
- Weki Meki - "Tiki Taka (99%)"
- Wheein - "Goodbye"
- W Project 4 - "1M1S"
- WJSN (Cosmic Girls) - "Boogie Up"
- Yesung - "Because I Love You 〜大切な絆〜"
- Youngjae - "Forever Love"

=== 2018 ===
- 100% - "Heart"
- Alex Christine - "Strike It Up"
- Big Marvel - Twilight (feat. Ysabelle)
- Bigflo - "Upside Down"
- BlueV - "MAMI"
- Bolbbalgan4 - "Starlight", "Travel", "Wind"
- Cross Gene - "Touch It"
- D7Boys - "Red Alert"
- DIA - "WooWoo"
- Elris - "Summer Dream"
- Favorite - "Where are you from?"
- Flowsik × Jessi - "Wet"
- F.T. Island - "Pretty Girl"
- GFriend - "Me Gustas Tu (Japanese ver.)", "Memoria"
- GLABINGO - "On My Body"
- Gugudan SEMINA - "Semina"
- (G)I-DLE - "Hann (Alone)", "Latata"
- Hong Jin-young - "Goodbye"
- H.U.B - "Finale"
- Imfact - "The Light"
- IZ - "ANGEL", "Granulate"
- Jeon Soyeon - "Idle song"
- Kim Dong-han - "Sunset", "Good Night Kiss"
- Lucente - "Your Difference"
- MAMAMOO - "Paint Me", "Star Wind Flower Sun", "Starry Night", "Egotistic", "Wind flower"
- Marmello - "Wake Me Up"
- Moonbyul - "Selfish (feat. Seulgi of Red Velvet)"
- Nature - "Allegro Cantabile"
- NEX7 - "Wait A Minute"
- Rothy - "Burning"
- Rothy - "SULLAE"
- SF9 - "Now or Never (Japanese ver.)"
- Shinhwa - "All Your Dreams (2018)"
- S.I.S - "Say Yes"
- SNH48 - "笔下之城 (Dream)"
- SNH48 - "Don't Touch"
- SNH48 - "森林法则 (Forest Theorem)"
- Solar - "Nada Sou Sou"
- Sori - "Touch" (feat. Basick)
- S.O.U.L - "Get Myself With You"
- Super Junior - "One More Time (Otra Vez)" (feat. Reik)
- TARGET - "Awake"
- The Unit - "My Turn"
- TRCNG - "Wolf Baby"
- UNB - "Black Heart", "Only One"
- UNI.T - "No More"
- UNI.T G - "Cherry On Top"
- Vromance - "Star"
- Wanna One - "Boomerang"
- Weki Meki - "Crush"
- Wheein - "Easy"
- WJMK - "Strong"

=== 2017 ===
- 100% - "Sketch U"
- 24K - "Only You"
- 4Men - "Break Up The Morning"
- 7SENSES - "7senses", "Girl Crush", "Like a Diamond"
- Ailee - "Reminiscing"
- AOA - "Bing Bing", "Excuse Me"
- April - "Take My Hand"
- B.A.P - "Honeymoon", "Wake Me Up"
- BTS - "Come Back Home"
- Bursters - "Dreamer", "Wherever You Are"
- CANDO (feat. 정재필) - "Funfun"
- CNBLUE - "Starting Over"
- Color Girls - "Colorful Days"
- Cross Gene - "Black or White"
- Crush - "Last Festival"
- DinDin - "Super Super Lonely"
- Eddy Kim - "Now"
- Elris - "Pow Pow", "We, First"
- Fly To The Sky - "Your Season"
- GFriend - "Fingertip", "Love Whisper", "Summer Rain"
- Heize - "In the Time Spent With You"
- Highlight - "Can Be Better"
- I - "I Wish"
- Ivy (艾菲) - "离骚"
- Ivy (艾菲) & Sdanny Lee (李斯丹妮) - "Bad Girls Need Love Too"
- Imfact - "Tension Up"
- Infinite - "Air"
- Jang Moon-bok & Seo Hyun-woo - "Don't Be Scared"
- Jessi - "Don't Make Me Cry"
- Kiku - "Rain"
- Kiku - "Yes or No"
- Kim Hyun-Joong - "風車<re:wind>"
- KNK - "Rain"
- KNK - "Sun.Moon.Star"
- Kriesha Chu - "Trouble"
- Letter flow - "Enough"
- Loopy & Nafla - "Internet War"
- Lovelyz - "Twinkle"
- MAMAMOO - "Aze Gag", "Yes I Am"
- Masta Wu (feat. Dok2) - "Shit"
- NCT 127 - "Limitless (Performance ver.)" (Filmed by their RollCam but the director is Kim Ja-Kyoung of Flexible Pictures)
- Nicky Park - "Fly High"
- Nine Muses - "Love City", "Remember"
- OGUGU - "Ice Chu"
- Pentagon - "Gorilla (Japanese ver.)"
- P.O.P - "Catch You"
- Romeo - "Without U"
- Rothy - "Star"
- Samuel - "Candy"
- Sdanny Lee (李斯丹妮) - "Animal"
- Shinhwa - "Touch"
- S.I.S - "I've Got A Feeling"
- SNH48 - "Dawn in Naples", "Glorious Times", "My Stage", "Summer Pirates", "Yes or No"
- Sohee - "Spotlight"
- Sonamoo - "I Think I Love U"
- Suran - "Sad Pain"
- Teen Top - "Love is"
- The Boyz - "I'm Your Boy"
- TopSecret - "Mind Control", "She"
- Trax - "Road"
- TRCNG - "Spectrum"
- UNIT BLACK - "Steal Your Heart"
- Urban Zakapa - Moai
- UP10TION - "Going Crazy"
- Vromance - "I'm Fine"
- Wanna One - "Beautiful (Performance Ver.)"
- Wanna One - "Energetic", "Wanna Be (My Baby)"
- Yesung, Seulgi - "Darling U"
- YHBOYS - "梦想加油"
- Younha - "Take Five"
- Z-uK - "Push&Pull"

=== 2016 ===
- 24K - "Bingo", "Still 24K"
- 4Minute - "Hate"
- Ailee - "If You", "Home (feat. Yoon Mirae)"
- Angels - "Always For You"
- AOA - "Good Luck", "Wow War Tonight 〜時には起こせよムーヴメント girls ver.", "愛をちょうだい (feat. Takanori Nishikawa)"
- AOA Cream - "I'm Jelly Baby"
- April - "Tinker Bell"
- As One - "Hey Ya!"
- B.A.P - "Feel So Good", "Fly High", "Kingdom", "Skydive", "That's My Jam"
- Baechigi - "Wakwak", "Hangover (feat. Jessi)"
- Basick - "Nice (feat. G2, Hwasa of Mamamoo)"
- Beast - "Butterfly", "Ribbon"
- BEJ48 - "元气觉醒 (The Awakening)"
- Berry Good - "Don't believe"
- Bolbbalgan4 - "Fight Day", "Hard To Love"
- Boyfriend - "Jackpot"
- BOYS24 - "E", "Rising Star"
- Bracelet - "Breakaway"
- BtoB - "Dear Bride", "L.U.V"
- Bumkey - "backindadayz (feat. Dok2, Microdot, 산체스 (Sanchez) a.k.a. Fassnakuh, dh-style)"
- Chancellor - "Surrender (feat. Lyn)"
- Choi Gogi, Yu Catnip - "Suddenly"
- CLC - "High Heels"
- Crayon Pop - "Doo Doom Chit"
- D.Action - "Check It Out"
- Drug Restaurant - "Mistake"
- Fiestar - "Apple Pie", "Mirror"
- GFriend - "Rough, "Wave"
- GNZ48 - "你所不知道的我 (You Don't Know Me)"
- Gugudan - "Wonderland"
- Heechul, Jungmo, Wheein - "Narcissus"
- HONGCHA - "Cheer Up"
- Huh Gak, Vromance - "Already Winter"
- Hyoyeon - "Mystery"
- Hyuna - "How's This?"
- I.O.I - "Dream Girls", "Whatta Man"
- Inlayer - "Mindjack"
- Jang Moon-bok - "Hip-Hop President"
- Jenyer - "I Do"
- Jessi - "Excessive Love"
- Jimin (feat. Xiumin of EXO) - "Call You Bae"
- JJCC - "ToDay"
- Kiku - "Everyday"
- Jun Hyoseong (feat. D.Action) - "Find Me"
- Jung Joon-young (feat. Seo Young-eun) - "Sympathy"
- K.Will, Junggigo, Jooyoung, Brother Su - "Cook for Love"
- K.Will - "You Call It Romance (feat. Davichi)"
- Kei, The Solutions - "Beautiful"
- KIXS - "Please come back"
- Kreatures - "Some Say"
- Laboum - "Journey to Atlantis"
- Lou.de - "Disrespectful breakup"
- Luizy (feat. Hyunsik of BtoB) - "Baby Ride"
- Luizy, Flowsik - "Recipe"
- M.A.P6 - "Swagger Time"
- MAMAMOO - "Angel", "Dab Dab", "Décalcomanie", "New York", "Tears (I Love Too)"
- Miss $ - "Don't Speak Without Soul"
- Monsta X - "All In" (Dance Practice ver.)
- Moon Jung-jae, Kim Il-ji - "Regrets and Resolutions"
- Nell - "Dream Catcher"
- Nine Muses A - "Lip 2 Lip"
- O21 - "Show Me"
- Romeo - "Miro"
- Ryeowook - "The Little Prince"
- Scarlet mojo-Pin - "I feel the swing"
- Shinhwa - "Orange"
- SNH48 - "Bingo", "夜蝶", "源动力", "公主披风", "浪漫关系", "哎呦爱呦"
- Seo In-young - "Hugged by You"
- SISTAR (feat. Giorgio Moroder) - "One More Day"
- Snuper - "You=Heaven"
- Sonamoo - "I Like U Too Much"
- Song Jieun - "Bobby Doll"
- Sunday, Kim Tae-hyun of DickPunks - "Still"
- Sweden Laundry - "foggy"
- SWIN-S - "New World"
- Sleepy (feat. Bang Yong-guk) - "Body Lotion"
- Teen Top - "Warning Sign"
- Two X - "Over"
- Tymee - "Cinderella"
- UP10TION - "Attention"
- Voisper - "In Your Voice", "Learn To Love"
- WJSN (Cosmic Girls) - "Catch Me", "MoMoMo"
- Wheesung (feat. LE of EXID) - "Hold Over"
- Yoon Do-hyun, G2, Reddy, Inlayer, Johnny - "Nightmare"
- Yuri, Seohyun - "Secret"
- ZE:A J - "Just Tonight"

=== 2015 ===
- 1931 - "Fire, 我@֦ "
- 2PM - "Guilty Love", "Higher"
- 4minute - "Cold Rain", "Crazy"
- A.Kor - "How We Do"
- Ailee - "Insane", "Mind Your Own Business"
- 黃鴻升Alien Huang - "Napoléon"
- Amber - "Shake That Brass"
- AOA - "Oh Boy", "Heart Attack"
- Apink - "Petal", "Remember"
- April - "Muah!", "Snowman"
- As One - "Candy Ball"
- B.A.P - "Young, Wild & Free"
- Baechigi (feat. Solji of EXID) - "Shut Up"
- Basick, Lil Boi (feat. Hwasa of Mamamoo) - "Call Me"
- Beast - "最後の一言"
- Ben - "Looby Loo"
- Bestie - "Excuse Me"
- Bigflo - "Delilah (Japanese Version)", "Obliviate"
- Boys Republic - "Hello"
- BtoB - "It's Okay", "Way Back Home", "Summer Color My Girl"
- BTS - "For You"
- Bursters - "Lost Child", "Whenever You Call Me"
- Change (feat. Ken of VIXX) - "4 Dimensional Love"
- Change - "8th Day", "Make Up"
- Cho PD – "Candy"
- CLC - "Like", "Pepe"
- DiaGirls - "Gently"
- DinDin - "New Leader (feat. Goo YooJung)", "Pour"
- Dongwoon - "キミしか"
- Ella (S.H.E) - "有何不可"
- Eric Nam, Park Ji-min - "Dream"
- Fly To The Sky - "If I have to hate you", "It Happens To Be That Way"
- F.T. Island - "Pray", "To The Light"
- GFriend - "Glass Bead, "Me Gustas Tu"
- Girls' Generation - "Party", "Lion Heart"
- Girls' Generation-TTS - "Dear Santa"
- Gyuri (feat. From the Airport) - "The Little Prince"
- g.o.d - "A Funny But Sad Day"
- Han Geng - "I Don't Give A Shit"
- Hello Stranger - "Mirage"
- Hello Venus - "I'm ill"
- High4 - "Baby Boy", "Day By Day"
- Hong Dae Kwang - "Good Luck", "With You"
- Hyolyn, Bumkey & Jooyoung - "Love Line"
- Hyuna - "Roll Deep"
- Infinite - "24hours", "Dilemma"
- Infinite H - "Pretty"
- Jang Hyun-seung (Beast) (feat. Giriboy) - "Ma First"
- Jaywon Jung - "She said"
- Jessi - "Ssenunni"
- Jimin N J.Don - "God"
- JJCC - "Fire", "Where you at"
- JJY Band - "OMG"
- Jun Hyoseong - "Into You"
- Jung Yong-hwa - "Mileage"
- Kara - "Summer Magic"
- Kim Feel - "Marry Me"
- Kim Hyung-joong (feat. Boa of Spica) - "Zero"
- Kim Tae-woo (feat. Jay Park) - "Lonely Funk"
- Kim Yeonji - "Forgot"
- Kixs (feat. San E) - "Beautiful"
- Kyuhyun (Super Junior) - "A Million Pieces"
- Lim Kim - "Love Game"
- M.A.P6 - "Storm"
- Melody Day - "Speed Up"
- My Name - "Just Tell Me", "Too Very So Much"
- NC.A - "Vanilla Shake"
- Nell - "Star Shell"
- Nine Muses - "Drama", "Hurt Locker", "Sleepless Night"
- Oh My Girl - "Cupid"
- Park Bo-ram - "Celepretty"
- Primary (musician) (feat. BSK, Gaeko) - "See You"
- Rainbow - "Black Swan"
- Roh Ji-hoon - "If You Were Me"
- Romeo - "Target"
- Shin Bora (feat. Vasco) - "Mis-Match"
- Shinee - Your Number"
- Sleepy - "Cool Night"
- SNH48 - "Bitter And Sweet", "Halloween Night", "Sounds Good"
- Snuper - "Shall We Dance"
- Sonamoo - "Cushion"
- Stellar - "Fool"
- Sunny Hill - "Child In Time"
- Super Junior - "Devil", "Magic"
- Super Junior-D&E - "Growing Pains"
- SUS4 (feat. Maboos) - "Shake It"
- T-ara - "So Crazy"
- Taeyeon (Girls' Generation) - "I"
- The Koxx - "echo"
- U-Know (TVXQ) - "Champagne"
- Uniq - "Eoeo", "Luv Again"
- Unpretty Rapstar 2 - "Don't Stop"
- Untouchable - "Crayon"
- UP10TION - "Catch me!", "So Dangerous"
- VIVIDIVA - "Service"
- VIXX - "Can't say"
- V.O.S - "Someday"
- Z.Hera (feat. Gaeun of Dal Shabet) - "Xox"
- ZE:A J - "Marry Me"

=== 2014 ===
- 2PM - "Go Crazy!"
- 4minute - "Whatcha Doin' Today"
- A.Kor - "But Go"
- Ailee - "Don't Touch Me"
- AOA - "Like a Cat", "Miniskirt", "Short Hair"
- Apink - "LUV"
- B.A.P - "1004", "Where Are You? What Are You Doing?"
- Bestie - "Thank U Very Much"
- Boyfriend - "Obsession", "Witch"
- Boys Republic - "Dress Up'
- BtoB - "Beep Beep", "You're So Fly"
- BTS – "Hormone War"
- CN Blue - "Truth"
- Crush - "Hug Me"
- Eric Nam - "Ooh Ooh"
- EXO - "Overdose"
- Fly To The Sky - "You You You"
- Galaxy United - "Heavy Rain Advisory"
- Gary - "Shower Later", "Zotto Mola"
- Girls' Generation-TTS - "Holler"
- Halo - "Come on Now"
- Hello Venus - "Sticky Sticky"
- High4 - "Headache"
- Hologram Film - "Return"
- Hyuna - "Red"
- JJCC - "At First"
- Jun Hyoseong - "Goodnight Kiss"
- Jung Dong Ha - "If I"
- Jung Jae Won - "She Said"
- Jung Joon Young & Younha - "Just The Way You Are"
- Kanto - "Before The Snow"
- Kara - "Mamma Mia!"
- Kim Bada - "Moonage Dream"
- Kim Hyun-Joong - "Beauty Beauty"
- Natthew - "Love Will Be Ok"
- NU'EST - "Good Bye Bye"
- Park Si-hwan - "I Just Loved You"
- S - "Without You"
- Secret - "I'm In Love"
- Seo Taiji - "Christmalo.Win"
- Shin Ji-hoon - "Crybaby"
- SNH48 - "Uza"
- Sonamoo - "Deja Vu"
- Song Jieun - "Don't Look At Me Like That", "Twenty-Five"
- Soyou & Junggigo - "Some"
- Soyou, Kwon Soonil & Park Yongin - "The Space Between"
- Spica - "Ghost"
- Sunny Hill - "Here I Am", "Monday Blues", "Once in Summer"
- Super Junior - "Mamacita", "This Is Love", "Evanesce"
- Super Junior M - "Swing"
- Super Junior: Donghae & Eunhyuk - "Motorcycle", "Skeleton"
- Swings - "Bulldozer", "Fallin", "Victorious 2"
- T-ara - "Sugar Free"
- Tae Wan - "Good Morning", "History"
- The Plain - "Lost Man"
- The SeeYa & Son Ho-jun - "More And More"
- TINT - "Wolf is Stupid"
- Troy - "Green Light"
- TVXQ - "Something", "Spellbound"
- Uniq - "Falling in Love"
- Untouchable - "Clockwork", "Take Out"
- Verbal Jint - "Rare Breed"
- VIXX- "Error", "Eternity"
- Will Pan - "Clown"
- Xxxy - "Flower"
- Yery Band - "Romeo Mannequin"

=== 2013 ===
- 2AM - "One Spring Day", "Regret"
- 4Minute - "Is It Poppin?", "What's Your Name"
- AA - "Midnight Taxi", "Ok About It"
- After School - "First Love"
- AOA - "Confused"
- AOA Black - "Moya"
- Apink - "No No No", "Secret Garden"
- B.A.P - "Badman", "Coffee Shop", "Hurricane", "One Shot", "Rain Sound"
- Boyfriend - "I Yah"
- Broken Valentine - "Aluminium"
- BTS - "N.O", "No More Dream", "We Are Bulletproof Pt.2"
- Candy Mafia - "Cliché"
- Davichi - "Be Warmed", "Just The Two Of Us", "Missing You Today"
- Evo Nine - "Make You Dance", "Superman"
- F-ve Dolls - "Can You Love Me?", "Deceive"
- F(x) - "Rum Pum Pum Pum"
- Girls' Generation - "I Got A Boy"
- GLAM - "In Front of the Mirror"
- H - "Lose Control"
- Hello Venus - "Would You Stay For Tea?"
- Henry - "Trap"
- Heo Young Saeng - "Weak Child"
- Infinite - "Destiny", "Man In Love"
- Infinite H - "Special Girl", "Without You"
- Jaurim - "Icarus"
- K.Will - "You Don't Know Love"
- Kanto (feat. Kim Sung-kyu) - "What You Want"
- Kara - "Bye Bye Happy Days!", "Orion (Japanese Version)"
- Kim Hyun Joong - "Unbreakable"
- LC9 - "Ma Ma Beat"
- Moon HeeJun - "I'm not OK", "Scandal"
- Nell - "Ocean Of Light"
- Nine Muses - "Glue", "Gun", "Wild"
- NU'EST - "Sleep Talking"
- Park Mu Jin - "Dala Dala"
- Park Myung Soo - "You're My Girl"
- Phantom - "New Era"
- Pure - "Still Love You"
- Roy Kim - "Love Love Love", "Bom Bom Bom"
- Secret - "I Do I Do", "Yoohoo"
- Seo In Young - "Let's Break Up"
- Skull & Haha - "Ragga Muffin"
- So Ji Sub - "Eraser", "Picnic"
- Song Jieun - "False Hope"
- Speed - "Pain The Love Of Heart"
- Sunhwa & Youngjae - "Everything Pretty"
- Super Junior: Donghae & Eunhyuk - "I Wanna Dance"
- T-ara - "Because I Know", "Do You Know Me?", "Hide & Seek", "Number Nine"
- T-ara N4 - "Jeon Won Diary"
- Tasty - "Ma Ma Ma"
- Team H (Jang Keun-suk) - "Feel The Beat (Japanese Version)"
- The Koxx - "Love Dance"
- Transfixion - "Rockstar", "Tonight"
- Untouchable - "Call Me", "Trip"
- Urban Zakapa - "Blind", "When Winter Comes"
- VIXX - "Girls, Why? (Feat. 옥상달빛)", "G.R.8.U", "Hyde", "Voodoo Doll","Only U"
- Zia & Lee Hae-ri - "If You Loved Me"

=== 2012 ===
- 4Minute - "Volume Up"
- A-Jax - "Hot Game"
- AOA - "Get Out", "Elvis"
- Apink - "Hush"
- B.A.P - "No Mercy", "Power", "Stop It", "Warrior"
- B1A4 - "Baby Goodnight", "Baby I'm Sorry", "Tried to Walk"
- Beast - "Beautiful Night", "I Knew It", "Midnight (Japanese Version)"
- Boyfriend - "Dance X 3 (Japanese Version)", "Janus", "Lady (Japanese Version)"
- Brown Eyed Girls - "One Summer Night"
- Brown Eyed Girls: Miryo - "Dirty"
- BtoB - "Irresistible Lips", "Wow", "Insane"
- Dalmatian - "E.R."
- Dal Shabet - "Hit U", "Mr. Bang Bang"
- Epik High - "Don't Hate Me", "Up"
- EXID - "I Feel Good", "Whoz That Girl"
- F.Cuz - "Dreaming I"
- F.T. Island - "I Wish", "Severely"
- F(x) - "Electric Shock", "Hot Summer (Japanese Version)"
- G.NA - "2Hot"
- Girls' Generation-TTS - "Twinkle"
- Hyuna - "Ice Cream"
- Infinite - "Be Mine (Japanese Version)"
- Infinite: Kim Sung-kyu - "60seconds", "I Need You"
- Juniel - "Fool (feat. Jung Yong-hwa), "illa illa", "Bad Man"
- K.Will - "Please Don't"
- Kim Hyun Joong - "Your Story (Japanese Version)", "Save Today (Japanese Version)"
- MBLAQ - "This Is War"
- Nell - "White Night"
- Nine Muses - "Ticket"
- Noel - "Leaving"
- Primary - "?" Feat. Choiza of Dynamic Duo, Zion T
- Primary - "입장정리" Feat. Choiza of Dynamic Duo, Simon D
- Secret - "Poison", "Talk That"
- Stellar - "UFO"
- Super Junior - "Opera (Japanese Version)", "Spy", "Sexy Free & Single"
- Super Junior Donghae & Eunhyuk - "Oppa, Oppa (Japanese Version)"
- Super Kidd - "Rockstar Pt.2"
- Team H (Jang Keunsuk) - "Can't Stop (Japanese Version)"
- Tiny-G - "Tiny-G"
- TVXQ - "Android Draft (Japanese Version)", "Humanoid"
- Ulala Session - "Beautiful Night"
- VIXX - "Rock Ur Body", "Super Hero"
- Will Pan - "24billy"
- Yang Yo-seob & Jung Eun-ji - "Love Day"
- Duble Sidekick (Song By Kim Tae Woo) - "When I Look At Myself"

=== 2011 ===
- 4Minute - "Heart To Heart", "Mirror Mirror"
- Apink - "I Don't Know", "It Girl", "Mymy"
- Beast - "Bad Girl (Japanese Version)", "Shock (Japanese Version)", "Fiction"
- Bang Yongguk - "I Remember"
- Bang Yongguk & Zelo - "Never Give Up"
- Dynamic Duo - "Friday Night", "Without You"
- F(x) - "Hot Summer"
- FTISLAND - "Hello Hello", "Like Birds"
- G.NA - "Black & White", "Top Girl"
- Girls' Generation - "The Boys"
- Huh Gak - "Hello, I Told You I Wanna Die"
- Hyuna - "Bubble Pop!"
- Jay Park - "Abandoned"
- Lim Jeong-hee - "Golden Lady"
- MBLAQ - "Cry", "Stay"
- Noel - "I Miss You"
- Secret - "Love Is Move", "Shy Boy", "Starlight Moonlight"
- Shinee - "Lucifer (Japanese Version)"
- Stellar - "Rocket Girl"
- Super Junior - "A-Cha", "Mr. Simple"
- Super Junior M - "Perfection Chinese Ver."
- Trouble Maker - "Trouble Maker"
- TVXQ - "Before U Go"

=== 2010 ===
- 4Minute - "Huh", "I My Me Mine"
- Beast - "Beautiful", "I Like You Best", "Soom", "Shock"
- Chae Yeon - "Look Look Look"
- G.NA - "I'll Back Off So You Can Live Better"
- Hwanhee - "하다가"
- Hyuna - "Change"
- Kara - "Jumping"
- Lee Seung Hwan - "Half Of Half"
- Lim Jeong-hee - "It Can't Be Real"
- Miss A - "Bad Girl Good Girl", "Love Again"
- NS Yoon Ji - "Don't Go Back"
- Park Myeong-su - "Fyah"
- Rainbow - "A"
- Secret - "Madonna", "Magic"
- Shinee - "Hello", "Lucifer"
- SS501 - "Love Ya"
- Trax - "Oh! My Goodness"
- Wheesung - "Even Thought Of Marriage"

=== 2009 ===
- 4Minute - "Hot Issue", "Muzik", "What A Girl Wants"
- Ahn Jae-wook - "사랑이 사랑을"
- Kim Bada - "Mad"
- Beast - "Bad Girl"
- Epik High - "Trot", "Wannabe"
- Hwanhee - "Because I Missed Your Heart"
- Wheesung - "Insomnia"
- Lyn - "Love... Is All Lies", "New Celebration", "True Story"
- Park Ji-yoon - "In My Fading Memory"
- Rainbow - "Gossip Girl"
- Seo Taiji - "Coma", "Juliet", "Snow Of Morning"
- Shin Hyesung - "Why Did You Call"
- Shin Seung-hun - "I'm Terrible In Love", "My Love"
- SS501 - "Love Like This"
- SS501: Heo Young-saeng - "Cant Remember Your"
- SS501: Kim Hyun-joong - "Hey G", "Please Treat Me Well"
- SS501: Kim Kyu-jong - "Wass Up"
- SS501: Park Jung-min - "Cannot"

=== 2008 ===
- Ahn Jae-wook - "이별 인 건지"
- Epik High - "Breakdown", "One 1minute 1second"
- Wheesung - "Star Falls"
- Nell - "Part2", "Recede", "Walking Through The Time Of Remembrance"
- Seo Taiji - "Bermuda Triangle", "Human Dream", "Moai", "Tik Tak"
- SS501 - "Dejavue", "Lucky Days", "Song For You", "Your Man"

== Commercial film (selection) ==
=== 2016 ===
- CJ CheilJedang - Petitzel Oh! Eclair Commercial Film (with I.O.I)
- KT CLiP - 클립행 (with Cheng Xiao of WJSN (Cosmic Girls))

=== 2015 ===
- Etude House - TV commercial

=== 2014 ===
- Haruyache Interactive Commercial Film
- TBC TV commercial

=== 2013 ===
- Samsung Galaxy - CNBLUE - Feel Good

=== 2012 ===
- Galaxy S Olympic Cheering Song - 모두 애쓰리
- LG - 3D TV 3D Content Video,'Girl's Generation'
- Samsung - YOG (youth Olympic Game 2012) Promotion MV

=== 2011 ===
- LG - 3D Contents G.NA
- LG Nethard
- Samsung - Mp3 Player Tictoc Promotion Winner
- LG Monitor - Super Led Monitor Global Promotion
- Aziatix - Cold [US Ver.]
- Hankook - 60th anniversary Promotion

=== 2010 ===
- Samsung - Mp3 Player Tictoc Brand Launching (Europe)
- Apple - iPhone 4 - Function Drama
- Apple - iPhone 4 - Creative Movie Ad
- Apple - iPhone 4 Launching Movie, Launching On Line
- KT Nexus One (Google Phone) – Commercial Film
- KT I Phone 4 Short Film - Zombie Hunter
- LG - Led Monitor Bland Launching World Wide Cm
- Manchester United 박지성 - 자생한방병원 -
- Samsung - Navibot Commercial Film
- Canon - Eos 500d Webtoon Drama (Seti – 윤태호작가)
- LG - Network Monitor BToB Promotion
- LG - LED Monitor Launching Video
- CGV - Promotion Video (China)
- Everland - Summer Splash Online Commercial film
- Nongshim - 둥지냉면 Launching Viral

== Concert documentary and VCR ==
=== 2012 ===
- Nell - Music Trailer
- Seo Taiji - 8th Album Documentary DVD

=== 2011 ===
- SBS Gayodaejun VCR

=== 2009 ===
- Seo Taiji - Möbius Concert Tour Spot
- Seo Taiji -Möbius Concert Tour Movie

=== 2008 ===
- Nell - Concert DVD
- Seo Taiji - E.T.P Festival CM
- Seo Taeji – E.T.P Festival DVD
- Seo Taiji - Symphony DVD
- SS501 - Music Drama

== Drama, Entertainment and Film ==
=== 2022 ===
- wavve - MMM_Where are we now (with RBW and Studio wavve)

=== 2021 ===
- Mnet, M2 - Kep1er-view (with CJ ENM, Swing Entertainment and WakeOne)

=== 2020 ===
- Netflix - Goedam (with Megabox Plus M)

=== 2017 ===
- Rakuten Viki, YouTube - UP10TION, Please! (with TOP Media and Soompi)
