= Rough (song) =

2016 single by GFriend

Single by GFriend

from the EP Snowflake
- Released: January 25, 2016
- Genre: K-pop
- Length: 3:29
- Label: Source; LOEN
- Songwriters: Iggy; Youngbae
- Producers: Iggy; Youngbae

GFriend singles chronology
"Me Gustas Tu" (2015)	"Rough" (2016)	"Navillera" (2016)

Music video
- "Rough" on YouTube

"Rough" (Korean: 시간을 달려서; RR: Siganeul Dallyeoseo; lit. 'Run through time') is a song recorded by South Korean girl group GFriend for their third extended play, Snowflake (2016). The song was written and produced by Iggy and Youngbae, and was released by Source Music on January 25, 2016.

The song was ranked at number 3 on the year-end Gaon Digital Chart for 2016 and was the best selling song of the year in South Korea with 1,903,126 downloads sold.

== Release and promotion ==
"Rough" was revealed as the lead single of GFriend's third EP, Snowflake, on January 14, 2016, and was released with the EP on January 25. "Rough" is the final song in the group's "school series" and represents the end of a school year. They maintained their "powerful-innocent" concept, wearing school uniforms and showcasing "perfectly synchronized fierce and powerful" dance choreography. The accompanying music video for "Rough" was inspired by the anime film The Girl Who Leapt Through Time. It was produced by Zanybros and directed by Hong Won-ki.

The group performed "Rough" for the first time at the showcase for the EP, held at AX Korea in Gwangjin District, Seoul, and broadcast live via Naver's V app. The group then promoted the EP with performances of "Rough" on various music shows, starting with SBS MTV's The Show on January 26. In their second week of promotion, the song won first place on every music show with a chart system. By February 28, "Rough" had won a total of 15 music show trophies, including "triple crowns" on M! Countdown, Music Bank, Show Champion, and Inkigayo. With these wins, GFriend is in second place for number of wins by a girl group for a single song, behind Apink's 17 wins for "Luv".

== Reception ==
The song made Billboard's 20 Best K-Pop Songs of 2016 list at number 13, stating that the group "solidified their place as one of the top new girl groups", adding that they "perfected their formula of synthesizer-driven pop with dramatic violin lines" with a "more impassioned vocal delivery than we heard from the six beauties".

"Rough" on listicles
Critic/Publication	List	Rank	Ref.
Billboard	Top 20 Best K-Pop Songs of 2016: Critic's Picks	13	
SBS PopAsia	Top 6 K-Pop Songs of 2016	1	
Kim Young-dae	Best K-pop Idol Songs of 2007–2017: Critic's Pick	—	
Yang So-ha (Music Critic)	Top 50 K-pop Tracks (2015–2019)	44	
Melon	Top 100 Songs of the Decade Chart	67	

== Chart performance ==
The song debuted at number 2 on the Gaon Digital Chart, on the chart issue dated January 24–30, 2016, with 298,228 downloads sold and 4,598,171 streams. In its second week, the song stayed at number 2 and topped the chart the following week, marking the group's first number one single in South Korea. The song topped the chart for two consecutive weeks and spent a total of seven weeks within the top 10.

The song placed at number 14 on the chart for the month of January 2016, with 325,098 downloads sold and 5,287,188 streams. In February, the song topped the monthly chart with 454,065 downloads sold and 22,466,115 streams - topping the Streaming Chart -.

The song also made the year-end chart as the third best selling song of the 2016, with 1,903,126 downloads sold - topping the year-end Download Chart - and 98,910,973 streams.

The song surpassed 100 million streams in January 2017 and 2,500,000 downloads in June 2018.

== Accolades ==
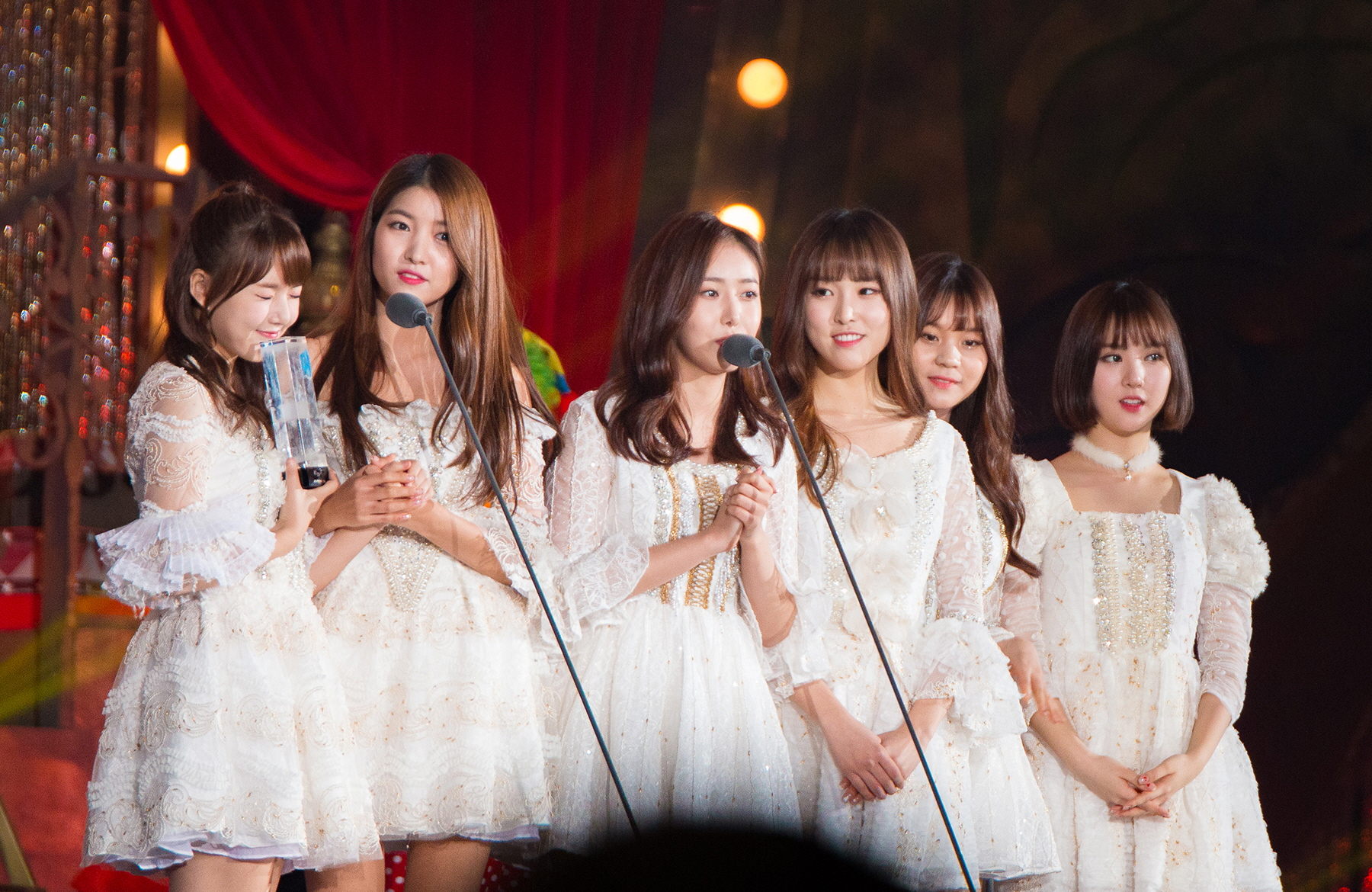
GFriend at the 2016 Melon Music Awards

Awards and nominations for "Rough"
Year	Organization	Category	Results	Ref.
2016	Mnet Asian Music Awards	Best Dance Performance (Female)	Won	
2016	Mnet Asian Music Awards	Song of the Year	Nominated	
2016	Melon Music Awards	Song of the Year	Nominated	
2016	Melon Music Awards	Best Dance Performance (Female)	Won	
2017	Gaon Chart Music Awards	Song of the Year – January	Won	
2017	Golden Disc Awards	Digital Bonsang	Won	
2017	Golden Disc Awards	Digital Daesang	Nominated	
2017	SBS MTV Best of the Best	Best of Best View	Won	
2017	Soompi Awards	Best Choreography	Nominated	
2020	Bugs Music Awards	20th Anniversary – Most Loved Songs	Won	

Music program awards
Program	Date (15 total)	Ref.
The Show	February 2, 2016	
The Show	February 16, 2016	
Show Champion	February 3, 2016	
Show Champion	February 17, 2016	
Show Champion	February 24, 2016	
M Countdown	February 4, 2016	
M Countdown	February 11, 2016	
M Countdown	February 18, 2016	
Music Bank	February 5, 2016	
Music Bank	February 12, 2016	
Music Bank	February 19, 2016	
Music Bank	February 26, 2016	
Inkigayo	February 7, 2016	
Inkigayo	February 21, 2016	
Inkigayo	February 28, 2016	

== Charts ==
=== Weekly charts ===
Chart (2016)	Peak position
South Korea (Gaon Digital Chart)	1

=== Year-end charts ===
Chart (2016)	Position
South Korea (Gaon Digital Chart)	3

== Sales ==
Country	Sales
South Korea (digital)	2,500,000+
South Korea (streaming)	125,291,174+
