= CocoSori =

South Korean musical duo

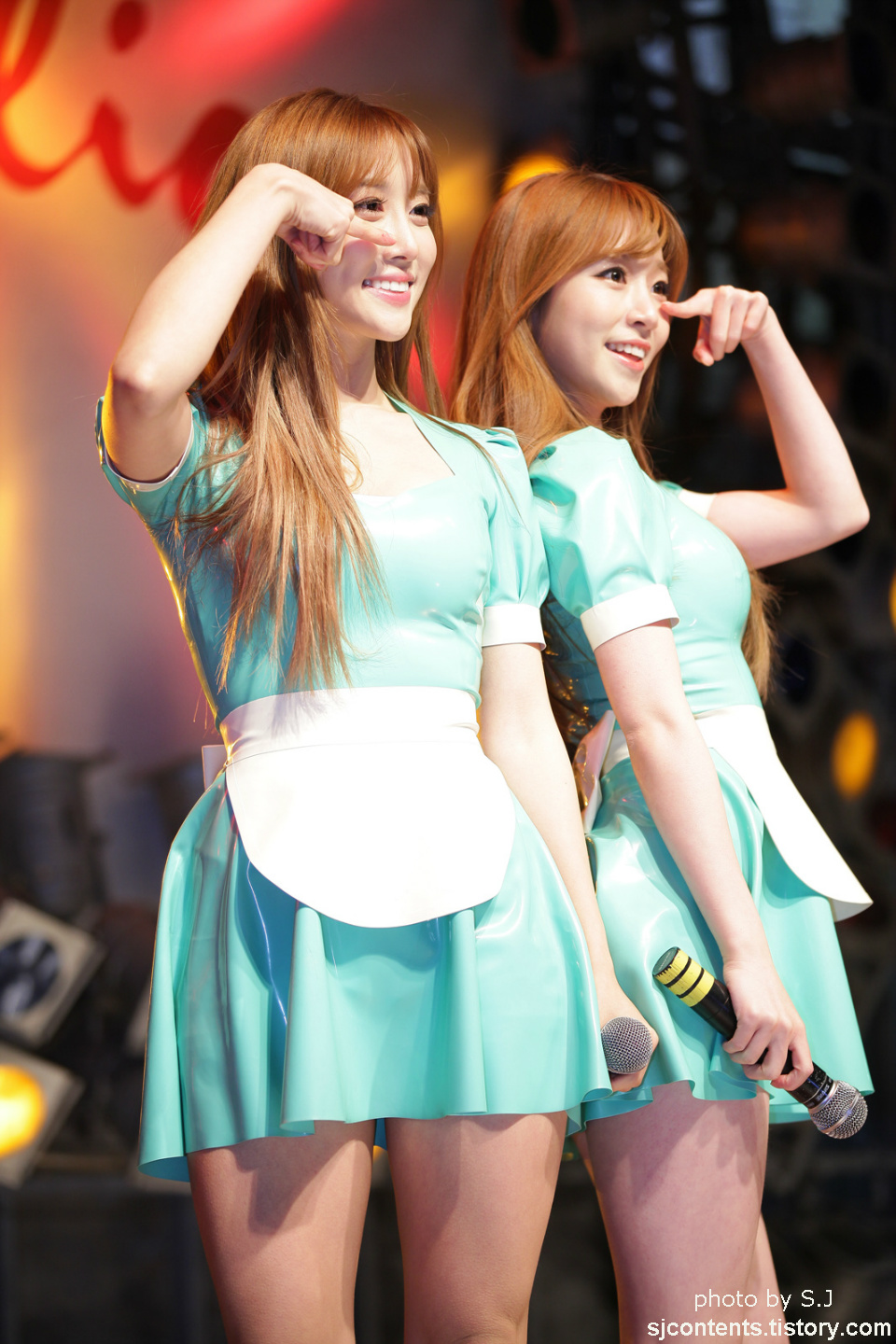
- CocoSori in 2016

Background information
- Origin: South Korea
- Genres: K-pop; J-pop
- Years active: 2016–2019
- Labels: Mole
- Past members: Coco; Sori
- Website: molent.co.kr

CocoSori (Korean: 코코소리) was a South Korean duo formed by Mole Entertainment. They debuted on January 5, 2016, with the single "Dark Circle". On February 1, 2019, through a direct statement from Mole Entertainment, CocoSori was announced to have disbanded due to internal conflicts with member Coco.

== Discography ==
=== Single albums ===
Title	Album details	Peak chart positions	Sales
Title	Album details	KOR	Sales
Mi Amor	Released: February 12, 2018; Label: Mole Entertainment, Sony Music; Formats: CD, digital download	34	KOR: 1,300

=== Singles ===
Title	Year	Peak chart positions		Album
Title	Year	KOR	JPN	Album
Korean
"Dark Circle" (다크서클)	2016	—	—	Non-album single
"Exquisite!" (절묘해)	2016	—	—	Non-album single
"Mi Amor"	2018	—	—	Mi Amor
Japanese
"Itoshi no Māmeido" (愛しのマーメイド)	2016	—	71	Non-album single
"—" denotes releases that did not chart.
