= Glass Bead =

2015 single by GFriend

Single by GFriend

from the EP Season of Glass
- Released: January 15, 2015
- Genre: K-pop
- Length: 3:23
- Label: Source; KT
- Songwriters: Iggy; Youngbae
- Producers: Iggy; Youngbae

GFriend singles chronology
"Glass Bead" (2015)	"Me Gustas Tu" (2015)

Music video
- "Glass Bead" on YouTube

"Glass Bead" (Korean: 유리구슬; RR: Yuriguseul) is the debut single by South Korean girl group GFriend. It was released by Source Music on January 15, 2015, as the lead single of their debut extended play, Season of Glass (2015). Written and produced by Iggy and Youngbae, the song was described by Fuse as a "nostalgic gem that heavily recalls Girls' Generation's earliest work, from the sound to the energetic choreography".

The song peaked at number 25 on the Gaon Digital Chart and has sold over 1,025,731 downloads, as of July 2016.

== Chart performance ==
The song debuted at number 89 on the Gaon Digital Chart, on the chart issue dated January 11–17, 2015, with 17,730 downloads sold. In its second week, the song peaked at number 25.

In the monthly chart, the song debuted at number 78 for January 2015, with 75,229 downloads sold. In February, the song rose to number 43, with 81,131 downloads sold. In March, the song peaked at number 39 with 121,825 downloads sold. The song made the year-end chart, as the 95th best selling song of 2015, with 681,925 downloads sold and 29,715,429 streams.

== Charts ==
Chart (2015)	Peak position
South Korea (Gaon Digital Chart)	25
