= Me Gustas Tu (GFriend song) =

2015 single by GFriend

Single by GFriend

from the EP Flower Bud
- Released: July 23, 2015
- Genre: Pop
- Length: 3:40
- Label: Source
- Songwriters: Iggy; Youngbae
- Producers: Iggy; Youngbae

GFriend singles chronology
"Glass Bead" (2015)	"Me Gustas Tu" (2015)	"Rough" (2016)

Music videos
- "Me Gustas Tu" on YouTube
- "Me Gustas Tu JP ver." on YouTube

"Me Gustas Tu" (Korean: 오늘부터 우리는; RR: Oneulbuteo urineun; Lit.: "From Today, We Are") is a song recorded by South Korean girl group GFriend. It was released by Source Music on July 23, 2015, as the lead single of the group's second extended play, Flower Bud (2015). The Japanese version was released by King Records on May 6, 2018, as the lead single of GFriend's compilation album Kyō Kara Watashitachi wa ~ GFriend 1st Best ~ (2018).

Considered as GFriend's breakout hit, the song boosted the group's popularity when a fan-taken video of a performance on a slippery stage went viral in September 2015. The song peaked at number 8 on the Gaon Digital Chart with 100 million streams and has sold over two million digital copies in South Korea.

== Background and release ==
On July 13, 2015, Source Music announced the upcoming release of GFriend's second EP, Flower Bud. The album was released as a digital download on July 23, and was released in CD format on July 27. The music video for lead single "Me Gustas Tu" was produced by Zanybros and directed by Hong Won-ki. One of the settings is a "dream-like" forest with the members wearing white lace dresses and rompers. "Me Gustas Tu" is the second song in the group's "school series" and represents a trip during summer vacation. The group's "pure" image was complemented by powerful dance choreography, rare for a girl group with an "innocent" concept. The choreography was created by Park Jun-hee, and the most notable part involves Yerin vaulting over Umji, while Yuju slides underneath in a split. It took the group three months to perfect the difficult moves.

=== Japanese version ===
In February 2018, GFriend signed with King Records. In late May, the group boarded for Japan to promote the compilation album Kyō Kara Watashitachi wa ~ GFriend 1st Best ~ which was released on May 23. The album consists of twelve songs including both Korean and Japanese-language versions of "Me Gustas Tu". The full music video of the Japanese version of "Me Gustas Tu" was released on May 6.

== Composition ==
The song was written and produced by Iggy and Youngbae, who previously produced the debut song of the group.

== Commercial performance ==
The song debuted at number 27 on the Gaon Digital Chart, on the chart issue dated July 19–25, 2015, with 66,912 downloads sold and 1,014,574 streams. In its second week, the song rose to number 15. In its eighth week, the song peaked at number 8, staying for two consecutive weeks, marking the group's first Top 10 single in South Korea. The song placed at number 59 on the chart, for the month of July 2015, with 137,376 downloads sold and 3,061,299 streams. For the month of August, the song rose to number 23, with 230,905 downloads sold and 9,734,931 streams, and peaked at number 13 in September, with 233,310 downloads sold and 13,117,951 streams. The song made the year-end chart as the 38th best selling song of 2015, selling 1,013,776 downloads and accumulating 50,169,974 streams. It was also the 27th best selling song of 2016, selling 1,150,274 downloads and accumulating 66,037,226 streams. The song surpassed 100 million streams in July 2016 and 2,500,000 downloads in November 2017. As of 2017, it as received over 136 million streams in South Korea.

== Music video and promotion ==
A music video for the song was released first on MBC Music on July 20, 2015 (rated as "General Audience") and uploaded three days later on the respective YouTube channels of the group and the single's distributor. The video, directed by Hong Won-ki from Zanybros, features the group in outdoor scenes, intercalated with dance scenes in a field. Due to the distribution change from Genie Music (formerly KT Music) to kakao M (formerly LOEN Entertainment), the music video was reuploaded on the YouTube channel of the latter's 1theK service on November 2, 2017. In turn, the former deleted the video from their own account.

GFriend promoted the album with performances of "Me Gustas Tu" on various music shows, starting with M Countdown on July 23. On September 5, they performed the song at an SBS Radio event in Inje, Gangwon Province. The stage floor was wet due to the rain, and Yuju slipped and fell five times during the performance, while SinB fell once. A fan posted a video of the performance to YouTube, which subsequently went viral, boosting the group's popularity. Promotion for the album ended the next day, with a performance of "Glass Bead" and "Me Gustas Tu" on Inkigayo. In January 2016, "Me Gustas Tu" was one of the songs broadcast via loudspeaker across the Korean Demilitarized Zone, as part of South Korea's anti-Pyongyang propaganda program Voice of Freedom. The broadcast was a response to a North Korean nuclear bomb test.

== Accolades ==
Listicles
Critic/publication	List	Rank	Ref.
Melon	Top 100 Songs of the Decade Chart	59	
Kim Young-dae	Best K-pop Idol Songs of 2007-2017: Critic's Pick	—	

== Charts ==
=== Weekly charts ===
Chart (2015)	Peak position
South Korea (Gaon)	8

=== Year-end charts ===
Chart (2015)	Position
South Korea (Gaon)	38

Chart (2016)	Position
South Korea (Gaon)	27

== Sales ==
Region	Sales	Ref.
South Korea (digital)	2,500,000	
