= Navillera (song) =

2016 single by GFriend

Single by GFriend

from the album LOL
- Language: Korean
- Released: July 11, 2016
- Genre: K-pop; pop rock
- Length: 3:14
- Label: Source; LOEN
- Songwriters: Iggy; Youngbae
- Producers: Iggy; Youngbae

GFriend singles chronology
"Rough" (2016)	"Navillera" (2016)	"Fingertip" (2017)

Music video
- "Navillera" on YouTube

"Navillera" (Korean: 너 그리고 나; RR: Neo Geurigo Na; lit.: "You and I") is a song recorded by South Korean girl group GFriend for their first studio album, LOL (2016). The song was released by Source Music on July 11, 2016, as the album's lead single. Written and produced by longtime collaborators Iggy and Youngbae, "Navillera" is a pop rock song that references Cho Chi-hun's poem "The Nun's Dance", with lyrics describing "a girl's desire to fly like a butterfly to be with the person she loves".

The song became GFriend's second number-one single in South Korea, topping the Gaon Digital Chart for two consecutive weeks.

== Release and promotion ==
On July 4, 2016, the tracklist of GFriend's first studio album, LOL, was released, revealing "Navillera" as the lead single. The single was released with the album on July 11, along with a music video. That same day, the group performed the song for the first time at a media showcase at Yes24 Live Hall in Gwangjin-gu, followed by a showcase for fans broadcast live via Naver's V app. The group then promoted the song on music shows, starting with SBS MTV's The Show on July 12. In the second week of promotion, GFriend won all five music show awards, on The Show, Show Champion, M Countdown, Music Bank, and Inkigayo. They won a total of 14 music show awards, including triple crowns (three consecutive wins) on The Show, M! Countdown, and Inkigayo.

== Chart performance ==
The song debuted atop the Gaon Digital Chart, on the chart issue dated July 10–16, 2016, with 278,636 downloads sold and 4,917,825 streams. In its second week, the song stayed atop the chart and fell to number 2 in its third week. The song also debuted at number 4 on the chart for the month of July 2016, with 482,833 downloads sold and 14,741,974 streams. The song made the year-end chart as the 29th best-performing song of 2016, with 1,113,582 downloads sold and 56,753,386 streams.

== Accolades ==
Listicles for "Navillera"
Critic/Publication	List	Ranking	Ref.
Billboard	The 100 Greatest K-pop Songs of the 2010s	98	

Music program awards
Program	Date
The Show	July 19, 2016
The Show	August 2, 2016
The Show	August 9, 2016
Show Champion	July 20, 2016
Show Champion	August 10, 2016
M Countdown	July 21, 2016
M Countdown	July 28, 2016
M Countdown	August 4, 2016
Music Bank	July 22, 2016
Music Bank	July 29, 2016
Music Bank	August 12, 2016
Inkigayo	July 24, 2016
Inkigayo	July 31, 2016
Inkigayo	August 7, 2016

== Charts ==
=== Weekly charts ===
Chart (2016)	Peak position
South Korea (Gaon Digital Chart)	1

=== Year-end charts ===
Chart (2016)	Position
South Korea (Gaon Digital Chart)	29
