= Idol Room =

Television program

- Promotional poster
- Genre: Variety
- Presented by: Jung Hyung-don; Defconn
- Country of origin: South Korea
- Original language: Korean
- No. of seasons: 1
- No. of episodes: 87

Production
- Production location: South Korea
- Running time: 60 minutes
- Production company: FNC Production

Original release
- Network: JTBC
- Release: May 12, 2018 – February 11, 2020

Idol Room (Korean: 아이돌룸) is a South Korean television program which aired on JTBC every Tuesday at 18:30 (KST) and was hosted by Jeong Hyeong-don and Defconn. The program is inspired by JTBC Newsroom, and it is produced in order to be the idol-specialised program with number one credibility.

It was also simulcasted through Naver V Live until episode 41. The show began on May 12, 2018, and originally aired on Saturdays at 16:40 (KST). The final episode of the season aired on February 11, 2020.

== Airtime ==
Air date	Airtime
May 12, 2018 – June 30, 2018	Saturdays at 4:40 PM KST
July 3, 2018 – February 11, 2020	Tuesdays at 6:30 PM KST

== Host ==
The nicknames for the hosts are inspired by Sohn Suk-hee.

- Jung Hyung-don (Don Hee)
- Defconn (Con Hee)

== Program ==
Usually, during or after each episode's recording, there will be a short live stream through Idol Room's Naver V Live channel that acts as a teaser to the episode. This was not available anymore after episode 41.

=== Studio Set ===
The studio sets used are as follow:

- Episodes 1-8: Black room with a large landscape screen at the background
- Episodes 9-51: Beige room with a tall portrait screen at the back
- Episode 52-87: Pink room with a landscape screen at the back

In some special episodes, the 2 hosts will go outdoors.

=== Theme Song ===
There are two theme songs for the show, one being produced by Pentagon's Hui and the other being produced by (G)I-DLE's Soyeon. In episode 5, where they appeared with their groups, they each were tasked with composing a theme song for the show. The theme songs will be played at the start of each alternate episode, beginning from episode 7 with Hui's produced theme song, and episode 8 with Soyeon's produced theme song. This has been discontinued since the introduction of Idol 999.

A third theme song, which is produced by N.Flying's Lee Seung-hyub, was performed live by the band at the start of episode 42.

=== Featured Corners ===
==== Current ====
- Idol 999 Forced Auditions: This is the program's new project which started on episode 52. It lets the 2 hosts find 999 idol group members and form the co-ed group 1001 (read as "One Oh Oh One") together. Every week, the guest(s) will undergo individual and group evaluations throughout the episode, and at any point of time the 2 hosts can give or take away grade(s) from each guest. The final grade of each guest can be of a single grade (e.g. A or B), or multiple grades (e.g. AA or ABF). The final member to be picked for Idol 999 will be selected through the Bomb Dance. When the balloon bursts while this member was holding it, even when they were in the middle of the handover, that member will become the selected idol to join Idol 999. There are other procedures done to choose the idol to join Idol 999:
  - For episode 54, instead of the Bomb Dance, the Bomb Interview is used as selection. The guests will pass down the bomb after saying a sentence, and this will be done continuously until the balloon bursts and the guest holding it when it bursts is the selected idol to join Idol 999.
  - For episode 55, where there is only Jeon So-mi taking part in the audition, the rendition of the game "He loves me... he loves me not" is played to decide whether she will join Idol 999 or not.
  - For episode 58, where there is only Eun Ji-won taking part in the audition, he will draw lots to decide whether he will join Idol 999 or not.
  - For episode 60, the members of NCT Dream will do 10 elephant spins and each will attempt to touch Don Hee's finger with his finger. The first member to touch will be the member of Idol 999.
  - For episode 64, the members of Pretty 95s will each compete against Don Hee for pulling the Couple Bar ice cream in half, and the member with the bigger portion pulled out will be the member of Idol 999.
  - For episode 65, Apink members Park Cho-rong and Kim Nam-joo will have to push fellow member Oh Ha-young, who was sitting on the hyodo chair, to the target and whether she lands on the target or not will decide whether she will join Idol 999 or not.
  - For the Twice audition, each member picks an Idol Room umbrella. The member who picked the umbrella with the hosts' faces will be the member of Idol 999.
  - For the Dreamcatcher-Everglow audition, episodes 78 and 81, the Idol 999 member would be picked through the return of Today's Pick-dol Close-up Camera.
  - For episode 75, the game of Yut is played. The stick of the member that shows the face (with the rest of the members showing the crosses) will be the member of Idol 999.
  - For episode 84, the members of Cosmic Girls challenge to eat jelly strips without the use of their hands. The fastest to finish her jelly strip will be the member of Idol 999.
  - For episode 85, the members of The Boyz challenge to inflate balloons with their mouths. The fastest to burst his balloon will be the member of Idol 999.
  - For episode 86, based on a theme, the GFriend member who did the same pose as Sowon (who is already a member of Idol 999) will be the member of Idol 999.
  - For episode 87, Ghost Leg is used. Eun Ji-won (who is already a member of Idol 999) will trace from a start point he chose and eventually to the Sechs Kies member, who then becomes the member of Idol 999.
- Metal Tray Dance Room: A corner introduced in Twice's third visit. This is a parody of the Metal Tray Karaoke Room from KBS show Happy Together. Each member stands below his/her metal tray, and he/she has to dance only when the light in front of him/her lights up, if not it is considered a failure and the whole group will be punished by getting hit by the metal trays above. Starting from episode 52, this corner is part of Idol 999's group evaluations.
- Ending Fairy Selection Bomb Dance: A corner introduced in Twice's third visit. All members dance to their new song while passing the balloon bomb around, and each member has to hold it for at least 5 seconds before being able to pass it around. When it bursts while one member is holding it, that member will become the "Ending Fairy". The benefit for becoming the "Ending Fairy" is that from immediately after the end of this corner until the closing of the episode, all cameras would be focused on this member. Starting from episode 52, this corner has become the crucial corner in order to select the idol for Idol 999 in each episode.
- Swimming Competition: A corner typically introduced to male idol groups for the Idol 999 Forced Auditions. Competing members will drink up the water through the straws as fast as possible until his own character falls to the line.
- Toast King: A semi-fixed corner where all members each attempt to catch a piece of bread that has bounced from the toaster with their mouths.
- Havana Korea Selections: A corner typically introduced to female guests only. All guests will dance to Havana in their own ways, one by one. The 2 hosts will pick a winner after all dances for the episode are done. This is often used to pick the sexiest member of the group. If the week's guest is only one person, she must dance to the song numerous times in different kinds of sexy dances to be crowned as uncontested winner.

==== Former ====
- Nano Dance: All members of the group will dance to their latest title song together first, then at the killing part each member dances to his/her own individual part one by one while the rest of the members stop moving, after that they will continue to the next part together.
  - An alternative of this corner specifically for bands, named Nano Band, was introduced in episode 42 with N.Flying as guests. All members of the band will perform the song together first, then at the killing part each member responsible for his own role will do his/her own individual part one by one while the rest of the members stop performing, after that they will continue to the next part together.
  - If the week's guest is only 1 person, the Nano Dance will be either:
    1. Repeat the same killing part 3 times: once with only the face moving, once with only the upper body moving, and once with only the lower body moving. This is seen during the episode with Seungri as guest.
    2. Showing different sides of the guest while repeating the same killing part. This is seen during the episode with Sunmi as guest.
- Fact Check: A corner to check on whether the news, rumors or theses about the individual members or the whole group are true or not. Before the recording of each episode, a notice would be put up on the Idol Room's Naver V Live channel to gather questions. There is an alternate version, named Live Fact Check, where the show would receive questions through a live stream instead of a notice.
- Q100 Question Vending Machine: A special corner introduced in Twice's third visit. The production team will collect questions from fans around the world and choose 100 questions to be placed inside the vending machine. The members place the coins into the vending machine and select the question package each member wants, and that question will be answered in the show.
- Does (Group name) Know Their Members Well: A special corner for groups approaching or past their debut anniversaries. The corner prepares in-depth questions about the members, and they will also be fact-checked. It was first introduced to Twice on their second visit.
- My Idol's Guinness: All guests will challenge for a new type of Guinness Record.
- To Me Letter: A special corner wherein all guests will each film video messages to their past selves in their debut year.
- One Column Dance: All guests stand in one column and dance to the mission song(s), showing the synchronisation between all members of the group. It was first introduced to GFriend.
- Today's Pick-dol Close-up Camera: All guests lie down surrounding the roulette that has a camera attached at the centre. The roulette is spun and the 1 person who is captured when it stopped spinning is picked as the episode's Pick-dol. Fancams of every corner focused on the Pick-dol will be uploaded on the Idol Room's Naver V Live channel after the episode has finished its broadcasting. There is an alternate version, named Today's Live Pick-dol Close-up Camera, where the corner will be progressed with a live stream, but will not reveal who is picked as the episode's Pick-dol. It will only be revealed during the broadcast of the episode, as per normal. The corner was discontinued starting episode 44, with the introduction of the LG U+ Idol Live application.
  - For the solo guests, the corner will be progressed with either different sides/emotions of the guest or with some of the staff wearing masks of celebrities related to the guest; for the latter scenario, if the guest was not picked, the reactions of the picked non-guest will be used, but fancams of the guest will still be uploaded.
  - For episode 28, with 21 guests, they play Rock–paper–scissors with Con Hee as the opponent, and the game is played (eliminated in the first round if one loses to Con Hee, and eliminated in the final rounds if one doesn't tie with Con Hee) until there is only 1 guest left and the Pick-dol is chosen.
- 357 Dance: Any number (from zero to all members of the group) will be called out by Don Hee at any random timing while the mission song is played. The corresponding number of members will move to the middle of the studio and dance to the mission song.
- Attention Dance: All guests set themselves in the position of at attention and dance to the mission song(s), without moving their arms.
- N.C.N Dance: Acronym for "When Number is Called Find the Camera With the Number Dance", also known as "Bun Bul Bun Dan" (번불번댄); Don Hee will call out any camera number from 1 to 6 at any random timing and all guests will have to move in front of the numbered camera and dance in front of the camera, marking it as the centre.

== Episodes (2018) ==
List of episodes (episode 1–33)

Ep.	Broadcast Date	Guest(s)	Today's Pick-dol	Note(s)	Ref.
1	May 12	Wanna One	Ha Sung-woon	90 minute special episode	
2	May 19	Shinhwa	Shin Hye-sung	—	
3	May 26	Highlight	Yang Yo-seob	—	
4	June 2	AOA	Jimin	—	
5	June 9	Pentagon, (G)I-dle	Soyeon ((G)I-dle)	Special corner of produced Idol Room theme songs showcasing	
6	June 16	BtoB	Lee Chang-sub	—	
7	June 23	Blackpink	Jisoo	—	
8	June 30	UNB, Uni.T	Yang Ji-won (Uni.T)	—	
Change in broadcast time to Tuesday at 18:30 (KST)
9	July 3	Apink	Park Cho-rong	—	
10	July 10	Twice	Jeongyeon	—	
11	July 17	Seventeen	S.Coups	—	
12	July 24	Seungri (BigBang)	Taeyang (BigBang)	Special appearances by DJ Glory, DJ TPA and DJ Danu	(Note: The Pick-dol picking corner was progressed alongside a few of the staff wearing masks of Yang Hyun-suk, Taeyang (BigBang), Yoo Byung-jae, Mino (Winner), Bobby (iKon) and Jennie (Blackpink). "Taeyang" was picked as the Pick-dol as the camera stopped at him. Reactions of Taeyang would be used in the show, but fancams of Seungri will be uploaded.)
13	July 31	GFriend	SinB	—	
14	August 7	Mamamoo	Solar	—	
15	August 14	Red Velvet	Seulgi	Special appearance by Jisung (NCT)	
16	August 21	Stray Kids	Woojin	Summer Vacation Special; Family Visit Special 1: Don Hee and Con Hee visit JYP Entertainment; Special appearance by Park Jin-young	
17	August 28	iKon	Chanwoo	—	
18	September 4	Sunmi		Special appearances by Kim Jong-min (Koyote), Umji (GFriend) and Yoojung (Weki Meki)	(Note: The roulette consists of 5 sides of Sunmi. The "bright and eccentric" Sunmi was picked as the Pick-dol as the camera stopped at the sign.)
19	September 11	Oh My Girl	Hyojung	—	
20	September 18	Got7	BamBam	Due to JTBC's coverage of the September 2018 Inter-Korean Summit, broadcast was postponed to September 19 at 00:20 KST (reflected as September 18); Special appearance by Hyunjin (Stray Kids); Special voice appearance by Park Jin-young through phone	
—	No broadcast on September 25 due to Chuseok				
21	October 2	WJSN	Yeonjung	WJSN members Xuanyi, Cheng Xiao and Meiqi are absent	
22	October 9	Weki Meki	Lua	—	
23	October 16	NCT 127	Johnny	Family Visit Special 2: Don Hee and Con Hee visit SM Entertainment	
24	October 23	Monsta X	Shownu	—	
25	October 30	Iz*One	Lee Chae-yeon	—	
26	November 6	Twice	Sana	Special appearance by Seunghee (Oh My Girl) through video call	
27	November 13	Gugudan	Sally	—	
28	November 20	Loona, Fromis 9	Go Won (Loona)	Rookie Girl Groups of 2018 Special	
29	November 27	Mino (Winner)	Lee Seung-hoon (Winner)	Special appearances by Lee Seung-hoon (Winner) and P.O (Block B)	(Note: The Pick-dol picking corner was progressed alongside 2 of the staff wearing masks of Kim Jin-woo and Kang Seung-yoon, together with Lee Seung-hoon who specially appeared in this episode. Lee Seung-hoon was picked as the Pick-dol as the camera stopped at him. Reactions of Lee Seung-hoon would be used in the show, but fancams of Mino (and Lee Seung-hoon) will be uploaded.)
30	December 4	NU'EST W	JR	—	
31	December 11	Hyungdon and Daejun, The Boyz	Sangyeon (The Boyz)	Special hosts: Jung Il-hoon (BtoB), An Yu-jin (Iz*One); Don Hee and Con Hee appeared as guests, Hyungdon and Daejun, in this episode	
32	December 18	Winner	Lee Seung-hoon	—	
33	December 25	Seungri (BigBang), Wanna One, (G)I-dle	—N/a	Christmas Special: The 1st Thank You Awards; Special voice appearance by B.I (iKon) through phone	

== Episodes (2019) ==
List of episodes (episode 34–81)

Ep.	Broadcast Date	Guest(s)	Today's Pick-dol	Note(s)	Ref.
—	No broadcast on January 1 due to New Year				
34	January 8	Sowon (GFriend), YooA (Oh My Girl), Bona (WJSN), Ahn Ji-young (Bolbbalgan4), Chungha	Bona	Year of the Pig Special	
35	January 15	GFriend	Eunha	—	
36	January 22	Seventeen	Mingyu	—	
37	January 29	—N/a		Unaired Clips Special 1	(Note: Featuring unaired clips from episodes 2, 6, 15, 23, 25, 30, 32, 34-36)
—	No broadcast on February 5 due to Lunar New Year special broadcast				
38	February 12	Taemin (Shinee)	Key (Shinee)	Special appearances by NCT (Jeno, Jisung), Chani (SF9) and Kim Dong-han	(Note: The Pick-dol picking corner was progressed alongside a few of the staff wearing masks of Key (Shinee), Kai (Exo), Jimin (BTS) and Ha Sung-woon (Hotshot). "Key" was picked as the Pick-dol as the camera stopped at him. Reactions of Key would be used in the show, but fancams of Taemin will be uploaded.)
39	February 19	Monsta X	Joohoney	—	
—	No broadcast on February 26 due to the broadcast of Political Desk				
40	March 5	SF9	Inseong	SF9 member Zuho is absent	
41	March 12	(G)I-dle	Miyeon	—	
42	March 19	N.Flying	Kim Jae-hyun	Special appearance by Lee Hong-gi (F.T. Island)	
43	March 26	Stray Kids	Seungmin	—	
44	April 2	Iz*One	—N/a	—	—
45	April 9	Henry, Bolbbalgan4	—N/a	Musician Special	—
46	April 16	NCT (Renjun, Chenle), Pentagon (Yan An, Yuto), Samuel, (G)I-dle (Minnie, Yuqi, Shuhua), Soso (GWSN), Kenta (JBJ95), Cherry Bullet (Kokoro, Linlin)	—N/a	Foreign Idols Special	—
Ep.	Broadcast Date	Guest(s)	This Week's Ending Fairy	Note(s)	Ref.
47	April 23	Twice	Tzuyu	Idol Room 1st Anniversary Special; Special video appearances by Iz*One (Sakura Miyawaki, Nako Yabuki, Hitomi Honda) on episode 48	—
48	April 30	Twice	Tzuyu	Idol Room 1st Anniversary Special; Special video appearances by Iz*One (Sakura Miyawaki, Nako Yabuki, Hitomi Honda) on episode 48	—
49	May 7	Kim Jong-min (Koyote), Chungha, DreamNote, Bvndit	—N/a	Please Take Care of My Junior-dols Special	—
50	May 14	The Boyz	Q	—	—
51	May 21	Got7	Yugyeom	—	—
Ep.	Broadcast Date	Guest(s)	Member Picked For Idol 999	Note(s)	Ref.
52	May 28	Winner	Kang Seung-yoon	Start of Idol Room's new concept: Idol 999	(Note: Final evaluation grades: Kim Jin-woo: C Lee Seung-hoon: AAC Mino: AA Kang Seung-yoon: F)
53	June 4	Fromis 9	Baek Ji-heon	Special voice appearance by Kim Hee-chul (Super Junior) through phone	(Note: Final evaluation grades: Lee Sae-rom: B Song Ha-young: AAAAA Jang Gyu-ri: A Park Ji-won: B Roh Ji-sun: A Lee Seo-yeon: AAA Lee Chae-young: F Lee Na-gyung: A Baek Ji-heon: AA)
54	June 11	Lee Hi, Paul Kim, Jung Seung-hwan	Jung Seung-hwan	Ballad-dol Special (main vocalist selection for Idol 999)	(Note: Final evaluation grades: Lee Hi: AAAAA Paul Kim: ABBBF Jung Seung-hwan: AB)
55	June 18	Jeon Somi		Special appearance by Kang Seung-yoon (Winner)	(Note: Final evaluation grade: AA)
56	June 25	Red Velvet	Seulgi	—	(Note: Final evaluation grades: Irene: AAF Seulgi: FFF Wendy: AF Joy: AFFFFF Yeri: AAAF)
57	July 2	GFriend	Sowon	—	(Note: Final evaluation grades: Sowon: AA Yerin: AA Eunha: AFFFFF Yuju: AA SinB: AAB Umji: AA)
58	July 9	Eun Ji-won (Sechs Kies)		Special appearance by Jang Su-won (Sechs Kies); Special voice appearance by Mino (Winner) through phone	(Note: Final evaluation grade: AAAAAAF)
59	July 16	Nature	Aurora	Nature member Gaga is absent	(Note: Final evaluation grades: Aurora: A Saebom: AB Lu: AFF Chaebin: AAF Haru: AAA Loha: AAA Uchae: AABF Sunshine: AB)
60	July 23	NCT Dream	Chenle	NCT Dream member Haechan is absent	(Note: Final evaluation grades: Renjun: AFFF Jeno: AF Jaemin: AAACFF Chenle: AAAAFF Jisung: AAAF)
61	July 30	Itzy	Chaeryeong	—	(Note: Final evaluation grades: Yeji: AAAAAAF Lia: FFFFFFF Ryujin: AAF Chaeryeong: AAA Yuna: FFFFFFFFF)
62	August 6	Oh My Girl	Arin	—	(Note: Final evaluation grades: Hyojung: AAAF Mimi: A YooA: AF Seunghee: AAAAA Jiho: AFF Binnie: FF Arin: FF)
63	August 13	Rocket Punch	Yeonhee	Special appearance by Nam Woo-hyun (Infinite)	(Note: Final evaluation grades: Juri: AF Yeonhee: ABF Suyun: A Yunkyoung: AF Sohee: A Dahyun: A)
64	August 20	Pretty 95s (Yook Sung-jae (BtoB), Ricky (Teen Top), Jo Young-min, Jo Kwang-min, Baek Kyung-do)	Yook Sung-jae	No Min-woo, also a member of Pretty 95s, is absent	(Note: Final evaluation grades: Yook Sung-jae: Many of Every Grade Ricky: Mostly Fs Jo Young-min: ACF Jo Kwang-min: AA Baek Kyung-do: AFF)
65	August 27	Oh Ha-young (Apink)		Special appearances by Apink (Park Cho-rong, Jung Eun-ji, Kim Nam-joo)	(Note: Final evaluation grade: Oh Ha-young: FFFF)
66	September 3	—N/a		Unaired Clips Special 2; Special host: Jeon Somi	(Note: Featuring unaired clips from episodes 44, 51, 55-57, 60-61, 64)
67	September 10	X1	Cho Seung-youn	—	(Note: Final evaluation grades: Han Seung-woo: F Cho Seung-youn: AA Kim Woo-seok: School Roll Warning Kim Yo-han: AFFF Lee Han-gyul: AAAA Cha Jun-ho: BF Son Dong-pyo: AFFF Kang Min-hee: AF Lee Eun-sang: FFF Song Hyeong-jun: AA Nam Do-hyon: A)
68	September 17	Seventeen	Hoshi	—	(Note: Final evaluation grades: S.Coups: AC Jeonghan: No Grade Joshua: No Grade Jun: AAAB Hoshi: No Grade Wonwoo: No Grade Woozi: No Grade DK: F Mingyu: A The8: AA Seungkwan: FF Vernon: No Grade Dino: No Grade)
69	September 24	Twice	Jihyo	Twice member Mina is absent; The first part of October 1's episode continued from September 24's episode	(Note: Final evaluation grades: Nayeon: A Jeongyeon: AAABFF Momo: AAA Sana: AFF Jihyo: Idol Room Chief Dahyun: AF Chaeyoung: F Tzuyu: AF)
70	October 1	Twice	Jihyo	Twice member Mina is absent; The first part of October 1's episode continued from September 24's episode	(Note: Final evaluation grades: Nayeon: A Jeongyeon: AAABFF Momo: AAA Sana: AFF Jihyo: Idol Room Chief Dahyun: AF Chaeyoung: F Tzuyu: AF)
70	October 1	Dreamcatcher, Everglow	Onda (Everglow)	—	(Note: Final evaluation grades: JiU: A SuA: AA Siyeon: AFFF Handong: A Yoohyeon: A Dami: AA Gahyeon: AFFF E:U: AA Sihyeon: AA Mia: AA Onda: AAA Aisha: AA Yiren: A)
71	October 8	ONF	E-Tion	Special appearances by Oh My Girl (Hyojung, Seunghee)	(Note: Final evaluation grades: Hyojin: AF E-Tion: A J-Us: F Wyatt: F MK: AFF U: A)
72	October 15	Super Junior	Leeteuk	Super Junior member Kyuhyun is absent, but made a special voice appearance through phone	(Note: Final evaluation grades: Leeteuk: Top in Variety Skills but Somewhat Desultory Heechul: Top in Variety Skills but Somewhat Desultory Yesung: Operated Sincerely (The Rest Are Omitted) Shindong: A Eunhyuk: Operated Sincerely (The Rest Are Omitted) Donghae: Operated Sincerely (The Rest Are Omitted) Siwon: AF Ryeowook: AF)
73	October 22	NU'EST	Baekho	—	(Note: Final evaluation grades: Aron: Top Scholar JR: AA Baekho: A Minhyun: FF Ren: Retained)
74	October 29	Monsta X	I.M	—	(Note: Final evaluation grades: Shownu: AAB Wonho: AAF Minhyuk: B Kihyun: AABF Hyungwon: AABCF Joohoney: AAFFFFF I.M: CF)
75	November 5	Winner	Lee Seung-hoon	—	(Note: Final evaluation grades: Kim Jin-woo: Top Scholar Lee Seung-hoon: AAAA Mino: AFFF)
76	November 12	Tomorrow X Together	Taehyun	—	(Note: Final evaluation grades: Yeonjun: AAA Soobin: AAFFF Beomgyu: ABFF Taehyun: AAAAA HueningKai: ABF)
—	The episode featuring Iz*One was scheduled to air on November 19 but was postponed indefinitely (and eventually cancelled) due to the Mnet vote manipulation investigation.				
77	November 26	AOA	Jimin	—	(Note: Final evaluation grades: Jimin: AFFFF Yuna: A Hyejeong: A Seolhyun: AAA Chanmi: AAAFF)
78	December 3	Kim Young-chul, Sejeong (Gugudan), Park Ji-hoon	Sejeong	Soloists Special	(Note: Final evaluation grades: Kim Young-chul: FFFFFFFFFFF Sejeong: AAAAA Park Ji-hoon: AAAAA)
79	December 10	CIX	Jinyoung	—	(Note: Final evaluation grades: BX: C and many Fs Seunghun: AFFF Yonghee: AAB Jinyoung: Many As and a few Fs Hyunsuk: AAACF)
80	December 17	Rainbow	Jung Yoon-hye	—	(Note: Final evaluation grades: Kim Jae-kyung: AAF Go Woo-ri: AAA Oh Seung-ah: A No Eul: A Jung Yoon-hye: A Kim Ji-sook: AA Cho Hyun-young: AF)
81	December 24	MAHEUN5 (Heo Kyung-hwan, Park Young-jin, Kim Won-hyo, Park Sung-kwang, Kim Ji-ho)	—N/a	Special appearance by Hong Jin-young	(Note: Final evaluation grades: Heo Kyung-hwan: AFF Park Young-jin: A Kim Won-hyo: AF Park Sung-kwang: AF Kim Ji-ho: AA)
—	No broadcast on December 31				

== Episodes (2020) ==
List of episodes (episode 82–87)

Ep.	Broadcast Date	Guest(s)	Member Picked For Idol 999	Note(s)	Ref.
82	January 7	SF9	Hwiyoung	—	(Note: Final evaluation grades: Youngbin: AAA Inseong: BF Jaeyoon: A Dawon: Many Fs, 1A Rowoon: A Zuho: A Taeyang: AAFF Hwiyoung: A Chani: B)
83	January 14	Momoland	Nayun	—	(Note: Final evaluation grades: Hyebin: AAA Jane: AAF Nayun: AF JooE: AFFFFF Ahin: A Nancy: FFF)
84	January 21	WJSN	Eunseo	WJSN members SeolA, Xuanyi, Luda, Dawon, Cheng Xiao and Meiqi are absent	(Note: Final evaluation grades: Bona: B Exy: A Soobin: No Grade Eunseo: A Yeoreum: AAB Dayoung: AB Yeonjung: A)
85	January 28	The Boyz	New	—	(Note: Final evaluation grades: Sangyeon: AA Jacob: A Younghoon: FF Hyunjae: F Juyeon: AF Kevin: AF New: AF Q: A Haknyeon: A Sunwoo: AF Eric: AF)
86	February 4	GFriend	Eunha	—	(Note: Final evaluation grades: Yerin: AFF Eunha: B Yuju: AAF SinB: AAF Umji: AA)
87	February 11	Sechs Kies	Jang Su-won	End of season; Includes unaired footage from episodes 68 and 77	(Note: Final evaluation grades: Lee Jai-jin: AA Kim Jae-duck: No Grade Jang Su-won: A)

== Ratings ==
In the ratings below, the highest rating for the show will be in red, and the lowest rating for the show will be in blue each year. Some of the ratings found have already been rounded off to 1 decimal place, as they are usually of lower rankings in terms of the day's ratings.

=== 2018 ===
List of ratings (episode 1–33)

Episode #	Broadcast date	Average audience share
Episode #	Broadcast date	AGB Nielsen
Episode #	Broadcast date	Nationwide
1	May 12	0.895%
2	May 19	0.702%
3	May 26	0.4%
4	June 2	0.5%
5	June 9	0.5%
6	June 16	0.6%
7	June 23	0.502%
8	June 30	0.6%
9	July 3	0.784%
10	July 10	0.695%
11	July 17	0.526%
12	July 24	0.829%
13	July 31	0.672%
14	August 7	0.770%
15	August 14	0.801%
16	August 21	0.816%
17	August 28	0.522%
18	September 4	0.665%
19	September 11	0.553%
20	September 18	0.4%
21	October 2	0.608%
22	October 9	0.649%
23	October 16	0.612%
24	October 23	0.499%
25	October 30	0.714%
26	November 6	0.960%
27	November 13	0.528%
28	November 20	0.691%
29	November 27	0.958%
30	December 4	0.682%
31	December 11	0.5%
32	December 18	0.876%
33	December 25	0.863%

=== 2019 ===
List of ratings (episode 34–81)

Episode #	Broadcast date	Average audience share
Episode #	Broadcast date	AGB Nielsen
Episode #	Broadcast date	Nationwide
34	January 8	0.797%
35	January 15	0.726%
36	January 22	0.879%
37	January 29	0.633%
38	February 12	0.520%
39	February 19	0.485%
40	March 5	0.470%
41	March 12	0.700%
42	March 19	0.597%
43	March 26	0.4%
44	April 2	0.642%
45	April 9	0.783%
46	April 16	0.587%
47	April 23	0.689%
48	April 30	0.788%
49	May 7	0.4%
50	May 14	0.2%
51	May 21	0.379%
52	May 28	0.492%
53	June 4	0.381%
54	June 11	0.482%
55	June 18	0.491%
56	June 25	0.751%
57	July 2	0.436%
58	July 9	0.785%
59	July 16	0.5%
60	July 23	0.359%
61	July 30	1.015%
62	August 6	0.501%
63	August 13	0.354%
64	August 20	0.481%
65	August 27	0.554%
66	September 3	0.625%
67	September 10	0.935%
68	September 17	0.469%
69	September 24	0.607%
70	October 1	0.486%
71	October 8	0.3%
72	October 15	0.684%
73	October 22	0.470%
74	October 29	0.396%
75	November 5	0.450%
76	November 12	0.429%
77	November 26	0.568%
78	December 3	0.450%
79	December 10	0.320%
80	December 17	0.614%
81	December 24	0.686%

=== 2020 ===
List of ratings (episode 82–87)

Episode #	Broadcast date	Average audience share
Episode #	Broadcast date	AGB Nielsen
Episode #	Broadcast date	Nationwide
82	January 7	0.506%
83	January 14	0.565%
84	January 21	0.382%
85	January 28	0.431%
86	February 4	0.566%
87	February 11	0.520%

- Note that the show airs on a cable channel (pay TV), which plays part in its slower uptake and relatively small audience share when compared to programs broadcast (FTA) on public networks such as KBS, SBS, MBC or EBS.
- NR rating means "not reported".
- TNmS have stopped publishing their rating reports from June 2018.
