= Season of Memories =

- Digital cover

Single album by GFriend
- Released: January 13, 2025
- Length: 6:07
- Language: Korean
- Labels: Source; YG Plus; Hybe Japan
- Producers: Lee Won-jong; Leevi Haapanen; Lenno Linjama; Noh Joo-hwan; Shintaro Yasuda

GFriend chronology
Walpurgis Night (2020)	Season of Memories (2025)

Singles from Season of Memories
- 1. "Season of Memories" Released: January 6, 2025

Season of Memories is the first single album (Note: Marketed as a "special album") by South Korean girl group GFriend. It was released on January 13, 2025, by Source Music. The album is a special project to celebrate the group's tenth anniversary, and is their first release since Walpurgis Night in 2020.

== Background and release ==
GFriend debuted in 2015 with Season of Glass. In May 2021, Source Music announced that the group would be leaving the agency upon the completion of their exclusive contracts. In 2022, former members Eunha, SinB, and Umji reunited to form Viviz under BPM Entertainment.

On September 24, 2024, Source Music confirmed that the members of GFriend would be reuniting in January 2025 for a special project in celebration of their tenth anniversary. In November 2024, Ilgan Sports reported that January 2025's "special project" would be an album, but the size and concept had yet to be determined.

GFriend's reunion project, Season of Memories, was officially announced on December 2, 2024 as a "special album", to be released on January 13, 2025, being preceded by a pre-release single on January 6. At the same time, it was announced that the group will hold two concerts at Olympic Hall, Seoul on January 18 and 19. Speaking of the comeback, GFriend member Sowon stated that "no matter what, we've never reunited or disbanded. I'm so happy to be back on stage because I've waited for four years."

== Promotion ==
Season of Memories will be promoted by the group with a concert tour of Asia, beginning on January 17, 2025 in Seoul. Originally announced along with the album as two standalone concerts at Seoul's Olympic Hall, a third show was added after tickets quickly sold out on December 9. On December 18, the concert series was further expanded, with a tour of Asia being announced, visiting cities in Japan, Taiwan, and Hong Kong in March. The announcement included a teaser poster for the concerts that shows the group members running through a field of snow.

The group also performed at the 39th Golden Disc Awards on January 5 in Fukuoka, Japan.

== Track listing ==
Season of Memories track listing
No.	Title	Writer(s)	Producer(s)	Length
1.	"Season of Memories" (우리의 다정한 계절 속에)	Noh Joo-hwan; Shintaro Yasuda; Lee Won-jong; Takayuki "Kojiro" Sasaki	Noh; Lee; Yasuda	3:06
2.	"Always"	Lauren Mandel; Rollo; Lenno Linjama; Lee Won-jong; Leevi Haapanen; Yuju; Umji; Danke; Jeong Chilli (PNP); Kim Soo-ji; Baek Sae-im (PNP)	Linjama; Lee; Haapanen	3:01
Total length:				6:07

Notes

- The Korean title of "Season of Memories", "우리의 다정한 계절 속에" (Uriui Dajeonghan Gyejeol Soge), means "In our affectionate season".

== Charts ==
=== Weekly charts ===
Weekly chart performance for Season of Memories
Chart (2025)	Peak position
Japan (Oricon)	30
Japan Top Singles Sales (Billboard Japan)	24
South Korean Albums (Circle)	3

=== Monthly charts ===
Monthly chart performance for Season of Memories
Chart (2025)	Position
South Korean Albums (Circle)	10

== Release history ==
Release history for Season of Memories
Region	Date	Format	Label
Various	January 13, 2025	Digital download; streaming	Source Music
South Korea	January 13, 2025	CD	Source Music
Japan	January 13, 2025	CD single	Hybe Japan
