= Mago (song) =

2020 single by GFriend

- Logo of the single

Single by GFriend

from the album Walpurgis Night
- Released: November 9, 2020
- Recorded: 2020
- Genre: K-pop; nu-disco; dance-pop
- Length: 3:19
- Label: Source; kakao M
- Songwriters: FRANTS; "hitman" bang; Kyler Niko; Paulina Cerrilla; Eunha; Cho Yoon-kyung; Yuju; Alice Vicious; Cazzi Opeia; Ellen Berg; JADED JANE; Noisy Citizen; Justin Reinstein; JJean; Umji
- Producer: FRANTS

GFriend singles chronology
"Apple" (2020)	"Mago" (2020)	"Season of Memories" (2025)

Music video
- "MAGO" on YouTube

"Mago" (stylized in all caps) is a song recorded by South Korean girl group GFriend for their third Korean-language studio album Walpurgis Night. The song was released as the title track of the album on November 9, 2020, by Source Music. It is the group's final release before their departure from Source Music and disbandment in May 2021.

== Background ==
On October 31, 2020, a sneak peek of the song and its music video was shown during the group's online concert GFriend C:ON. On the same day, members Eunha and Umji appeared on the show Knowing Bros and showcased a tip of the song and its choreography.

== Composition ==
"Mago"
A 24-second sample of "Mago", a disco and dance-pop song.

The song was written and produced by FRANTS. Many other producers also participated in writing the song: "hitman" bang, Kyler Niko, Paulina Cerrilla, Cho Yoon-kyung, Alice Vicious, Cazzi Opeia, Ellen Berg, JADED JANE, Noisy Citizen, Justin Reinstein and JJean. Members Eunha, Yuju and Umji participated as well in writing lyrics for the song.

The song was described by Teen Vogue's Sara Delgado as "one of the most striking videos to come from GFriend to date".

== Chart performance ==
The song debuted at number 17 on Billboard's World Digital Song Sales and peaked at number 16 a week after. It debuted at number 46 on Billboard's K-pop Hot 100 for the week ending November 21, 2020 and at number 42 on Gaon Digital Chart for the week ending November 14, 2020.

== Music video ==
On October 31, 2020, a sneak peek of the music video for "Mago" was shown during the group's online concert GFriend C:ON. The music video was then released on HYBE Labels's YouTube channel on November 9, 2020, along with the album. It was directed by Guzza of Lumpens, who previously directed the music video for their previous single, "Apple".

== Accolades ==
Year-end lists
Critics/Publication	List	Rank	Ref.
SCMP	The Best 15 Singles from K-pop Groups in 2020	1	
Billboard	20 Best K-Pop Songs of 2020: Critic's Picks	4	
Dazed	The 40 Best K-pop Songs of 2020	9	
Paper	The 40 Best K-pop Songs of 2020	12	
Don't Bore Us	10 K-pop Tracks from 2020	—	

Music program awards
Program	Date	Ref.
The Show	November 17, 2020	
Show Champion	November 18, 2020	

== Charts ==
=== Weekly charts ===
Chart (2020)	Peak position
Malaysia (RIM)	18
Singapore (RIAS)	18
South Korea (Gaon)	42
South Korea (Kpop Hot 100)	35
US World Digital Song Sales (Billboard)	16

=== Monthly charts ===
Chart (November 2020)	Position
South Korea (Gaon)	99

== Release history ==
Release dates and formats for "Mago"
Region	Date	Format	Label	Ref.
Various	November 9, 2020	CD; digital download; streaming	Source Music; kakao M	
