= Song of the Sirens =

- Digital and Apple version cover

EP by GFriend
- Released: July 13, 2020
- Recorded: March–July 2020
- Venue: Seoul, South Korea
- Studio: Source Studios, Big Hit Studios
- Genre: K-pop; dance
- Length: 21:29
- Label: Source; kakao M

GFriend chronology
Labyrinth (2020)	Song of the Sirens (2020)	Walpurgis Night (2020)

Singles from Song of the Sirens
- 1. "Apple" Released: July 13, 2020

Song of the Sirens (stylized as 回:Song of the Sirens) is the ninth extended play by South Korean girl group GFriend, released on July 13, 2020, by Source Music and distributed by kakao M. The EP contains six songs including the lead single "Apple".

== Release and promotion ==
On June 17, 2020, it was reported that GFriend would come back on July 13 with a new mini-album titled 回:Song of the Sirens. It's the second release of the series "回". A source also reported that: "GFriend recently wrapped up filming the music video for their title track. Throughout the filming, the staff on set were surprised by GFriend’s shocking transformation." Preorders began on June 22. On June 26, the group released the comeback timetable of their album. On June 28, the group released a teaser video titled "A Tale of the Glass Bead: Butterfly Effect" through Hybe Corporation's official YouTube channel. On June 30, GFriend released the first set of concept photos titled "Broken Room". The "Titled" and "Apple" versions of concept photos were released respectively on July 2 and July 4. The tracklist of the album was released on July 6. The highlight medley was released two days later. On July 10, the first teaser of the music video for their lead single "Apple" was uploaded on Hybe Corporation’s YouTube channel. The second teaser was uploaded two days later. The EP was released on July 13 along with the music video for "Apple".

== Production and composition ==
For "Apple", Yuju and Eunha both participated in composing and writing lyrics for the song. Yuju, Eunha, and Umji participated in writing lyrics for "Tarot Cards", and Yuju and Umji both worked on "Eye of the Storm" together with Umji writing lyrics and Yuju participating in composing the song.

The last track of the album, "Stairs in the North", is based on SinB's personal story. In an interview with ELLE magazine, they talked about how the group discussed with the staff about music, including thoughts about the past, present, future of the group. The song was mainly inspired by the ups and downs of their lives.

== Track listing ==
No.	Title	Writer(s)	Producer(s)	Length
1.	"Apple"	FRANTS; Pdogg; "hitman" bang; Hwang Hyun (MonoTree); Eunha; Hannah Robinson; Richard Phillips; Alex Nese; Chendy; Yuju; Noh Joo-hwan; Kim Jin (Makeumine Works); Gu Yeo-reum (Makeumine Works); Lee Seu-ran	FRANTS; Pdogg; "hitman" bang	3:27
2.	"Eye of the Storm" (눈의 시간; Nun-ui sigan: lit. Time of the Eye)	Alyssa Ayaka Ichinose; Mike Macdermid; Charlotte Churchman; David Brant; "hitman" bang; Umji; Lee Mi-seong (VoidheaD); Lee Seu-ran; Yuju; Kim Jin (Makeumine Works)	Alyssa Ayaka Ichinose	3:41
3.	"Room of Mirrors" (거울의 방; Geour-ui bang)	Noh Joo-hwan; Lee Won-jong; D.Ori; Steven Lee; Caroline Gustavsson; Kim Kiwi	Noh Joo-hwan; Lee Won-jong	3:27
4.	"Tarot Cards"	Jung Ho-hyun (e.one); Kim Yeon-seo; Sophia Pae; Val Del Prete; Son Ko-eun (MonoTree); Cho Yoon-kyung; Yuju; Eunha; Umji	Jung Ho-hyun (e.one)	3:15
5.	"Crème Brûlée"	Lee Woo-min "collapsedone"; Justin Reinstein; Mayu Wakisaka; Lee Seu-ran	Lee Woo-min "collapsedone"; Justin Reinstein	3:17
6.	"Stairs in the North" (북쪽 계단; Bukjjok gyedan)	"hitman" bang; FRANTS	FRANTS	4:20
Total length:				21:29

== Charts ==
=== Weekly charts ===
Weekly chart performance for 回:Song of the Sirens
Chart (2020)	Peak position
South Korean Albums (Gaon)	3

=== Monthly charts ===
Monthly chart performance for 回:Song of the Sirens
Chart (July 2020)	Position
South Korean Albums (Gaon)	7

== Accolades ==
Music program awards
Song	Program	Date	Ref.
"Apple"	The Show	July 21, 2020	
"Apple"	Show Champion	July 22, 2020	
"Apple"	M Countdown	July 23, 2020	

== Release history ==
Release dates and formats for 回:Song of the Sirens
Region	Date	Format	Label	Ref.
Various	July 13, 2020	CD; digital download; streaming	Source Music; kakao M	
