= Fever Season (EP) =

- Digital and 熱(열) version cover.

EP by GFriend
- Released: July 1, 2019
- Recorded: 2019
- Genres: K-pop; tropical house
- Length: 27:20
- Labels: Source; Kakao M

GFriend chronology
Time for Us (2019)	Fever Season (2019)	Fallin' Light (2019)

Singles from Fever Season
- 1. "Fever" Released: July 1, 2019

Fever Season is the seventh extended play (EP) by South Korean girl group GFriend. It was released by Source Music on July 1, 2019, and distributed by kakao M. It debuted at number 10 on the Billboard World Albums chart. A music video was released for "Fever".

== Promotion ==
The group promoted the single "Fever" in several music shows having received 7 music shows wins with the single during the promotion of the EP.

== Production and composition ==
"Fever" was released as the lead single in conjunction with the EP on July 1, 2019.

All GFriend members participated in writing lyrics for the song "Hope" with Lee Won-jong.

The EP includes the song the Korean version of the group's third Japanese single "Flower".

== Commercial performance ==
The EP debuted at number one on South Korea's Gaon Album Chart becoming the group's 4th album to achieve

== Track listing ==
No.	Title	Lyrics	Music	Arrangement	Length
1.	"Fever" (열대야; Yeoldaeya: lit. Tropical Night)	Igi (Oreo), Cino (Oreo), Ung Kim (Oreo)	Igi (Oreo), Cino (Oreo), Ung Kim (Oreo)	Cino (Oreo), Ung Kim (Oreo)	3:34
2.	"Mr. Blue"	13	13	13	3:17
3.	"Smile" (좋은 말 한때; Joeun mal hanttae: lit. Good Words)	Noh Joo-hwan	Noh Joo-hwan, Lee Won-jong	Noh Joo-hwan, Lee Won-jong	3:15
4.	"Wish" (바라; Bara: lit. Want)	MosPick	MosPick	MosPick	3:16
5.	"Paradise"	Islan	Jeong Ho-hyun (e.one)	Jeong Ho-hyun (e.one)	3:14
6.	"Hope" (기대; Gidae: lit. Expectation)	Sowon, Yerin, Eunha, Yuju, SinB, Umji, Lee Won-jong	Lee Won-jong	Lee Won-jong	3:28
7.	"Flower" (Korean version)	13	13	13	3:37
8.	"Fever" (instrumental)		Igi (Oreo), Cino (Oreo), Ung Kim (Oreo)	Cino (Oreo), Ung Kim (Oreo)	3:33
Total length:					27:20

== Charts ==
=== Album ===
Chart (2019)	Peak position
South Korean Albums (Gaon)	1
US World Albums (Billboard)	10

==== Year-end charts ====
Chart (2019)	Position
South Korean Albums (Gaon)	68

=== Single ===
"Fever"

Chart (2019)	Peak position
South Korea (Gaon)	27
South Korea (K-pop Hot 100)	13

== Accolades ==
Year-end song lists
Critic/Publication	List	Song	Rank	Ref.
MTV	The Best K-pop B-sides of 2019	"Paradise"	16	
