= School of Performing Arts Seoul =

Private high school in Seoul, South Korea

School of Performing Arts Seoul (SOPA) 서울공연예술고등학교 (서공예)

Location
- 16-26 Ori-ro 22na-gil, Guro District; Seoul; South Korea; 37°30′01″N 126°49′55″E

Information
- Type: Private
- Established: 1966 (60 years ago)
- Principal: Im Ho-seong (임호성)
- Deputy principal: Kwon Oh-hyun (권오현)
- Faculty: 37
- Gender: Co-educational
- Enrollment: 813
- Colors: Yellow
- Website: sopa.hs.kr

School of Performing Arts Seoul (SOPA; Korean: 서울공연예술고등학교 / 서공예) is an arts high school located in Gung-dong, Guro District, in Seoul, South Korea.

== History ==
SOPA was founded on March 6, 1966 as Jeonghui High School (정희고등공민학교). On February 28, 2002, Park Jae-ryeon was appointed as principal. SOPA was relocated on September 1, 2008 to its current location at 147-1 Gung-dong, Guro-gu in Seoul.

After changing its name to School of Performing Arts Seoul (Korean: 서울공연예술고등학교; RR: Seo-ul Gong-yeon Yesul Godeung Hakkyo), SOPA took in their first batch of students on March 1, 2009. There are a total of 11,935 graduates as of February 4, 2016, with March 2, 2016 marking new student admissions for the 2016 school year.

== Departments ==
- Department of Theatre & Film
- Department of Practical Dance
- Department of Practical Music
- Department of Stage Arts
- Department of Theatre Arts (combined with Department of Broadcasting Arts to form Department of Theatre & Film)
- Department of Broadcasting Arts (combined with Department of Theatre Arts to form Department of Theatre & Film)

== Notable alumni ==
- An Yu-jin
- Bae Suzy
- Bang Ye-dam
- Cheng Xiao
- Choi Jin-ri (aka "Sulli")
- Choi Jun-hong (aka "Zelo")
- Choi Jisu (aka "Lia")
- Choi Min-hwan
- Choi Seo-ah (aka "Juniel")
- Choi Ye-won (aka "Arin")
- Choi Yoo-jung
- Choi Yu-na (aka "Yuju")
- Choi Seungcheol (aka "S.Coups")
- Chu So-jung (aka "Exy")
- Gong Chan-sik (aka "Gongchan")
- Heo Young-ji
- Hong Ye-ji
- Hwang Eun-bi (aka "SinB")
- Hwang Hyun-jin
- Hwang Min-hyun
- Im Da-young
- Jang Do-yoon
- Jang Won-young
- Jang Ye-eun
- Jeon Jung-kook
- Jeon Wonwoo
- Jeong Yun-o (aka "Jaehyun")
- Jo Kwang-min
- Jo Young-min
- Jung Chae-yeon
- Jung Eun-bi (aka "Eunha")
- Jeong Se-woon
- Jeong Yun-ho
- Jung Ye-rin
- Jung Yoon-seok
- Kang Chan-hee
- Kang Mi-na
- Kang Seul-gi
- Kang Yi-seok
- Kim Do-yeon
- Kim Jae-hyun
- Kim Jae-won
- Kim Ji-soo
- Kim Jong-in (aka "Kai")
- Kim Min-jae
- Kim Min-ju
- Kim Nam-joo
- Kim Sae-ron
- Kim Woo-jin
- Kim Ye-won (aka "Umji")
- Kwak Dong-yeon
- Kwon Eun-bi
- Lee Da-bin (aka "Yeonwoo")
- Lee Dae-hwi
- Lee Ha-yi
- Lee Dong-hyuck (aka "Haechan")
- Lee Hye-ri
- Lee Jae-jin
- Lee Je-no
- Lee Jong-hyun
- Lee Na-eun
- Lee Seok-min (aka "DK")
- Lee Tae-yong
- Lee Young-yoo
- Mark Lee
- Na Hae-ryung
- Na Jae-min
- Oh Ha-young
- Oh Se-hun
- Park Ji-hoon
- Park Jung-hyun (aka "Xiyeon")
- Park Soo-young (aka "Joy")
- Ryu Su-jeong
- Seo Ji-hee
- Shin Ji-hoon
- Son Na-eun
- Son Seung-yeon
- Song Seung-hyun
- Yang Jeong-in (aka "I.N")
- Zhou Jieqiong
