= Fever (GFriend song) =

2019 single by GFriend

Single by GFriend

from the EP Fever Season
- Released: July 1, 2019
- Genre: K-pop; EDM; moombahton; synthpop
- Length: 3:34
- Label: Source; kakao M
- Songwriters: Iggy; C-no; Ung Kim
- Producers: Iggy; C-no; Ung Kim

GFriend singles chronology
"Oh Difficult" (2019)	"Fever" (2019)	"Fallin' Light" (2019)

Music video
- "Fever" on YouTube

"Fever" (Korean: 열대야; RR: Yeoldaeya) is a song recorded by South Korean girl group GFriend for their seventh extended play Fever Season. The song was released as the title track of the EP on July 1, 2019 by Source Music.

== Composition ==
The song was written and produced by C-no, Ung Kim and Iggy who was also part of the creation of all the group's singles until "Summer Rain". It was described by Billboard's Tamar Herman, as a "sleek dance track all about the heat of a romance that doesn't diminish even during the cool nighttime".

== Chart performance ==
The song debuted and peaked at number 27 on the Gaon Digital Chart for the week ending June 30, 2019.

== Music video ==
A music video for the song was uploaded on GFriend's and 1theK's YouTube channels on July 1, 2019, at the same moment as the EP. Then, on July 11, a choreography version of the music video was released, As of 2021 the video gained 31 million views.

== Accolades ==
Music program awards
Program	Date	Ref.
The Show	July 9, 2019	
Show Champion	July 10, 2019	
M Countdown	July 11, 2019	
Music Bank	July 12, 2019	
Show! Music Core	July 13, 2019	
Inkigayo	July 14, 2019	

== Charts ==
Chart (2019)	Peak position
South Korea (Gaon)	27
South Korea (Kpop Hot 100)	13

== See also ==
- List of M Countdown Chart winners (2019)
