= GFriend =

South Korean girl group

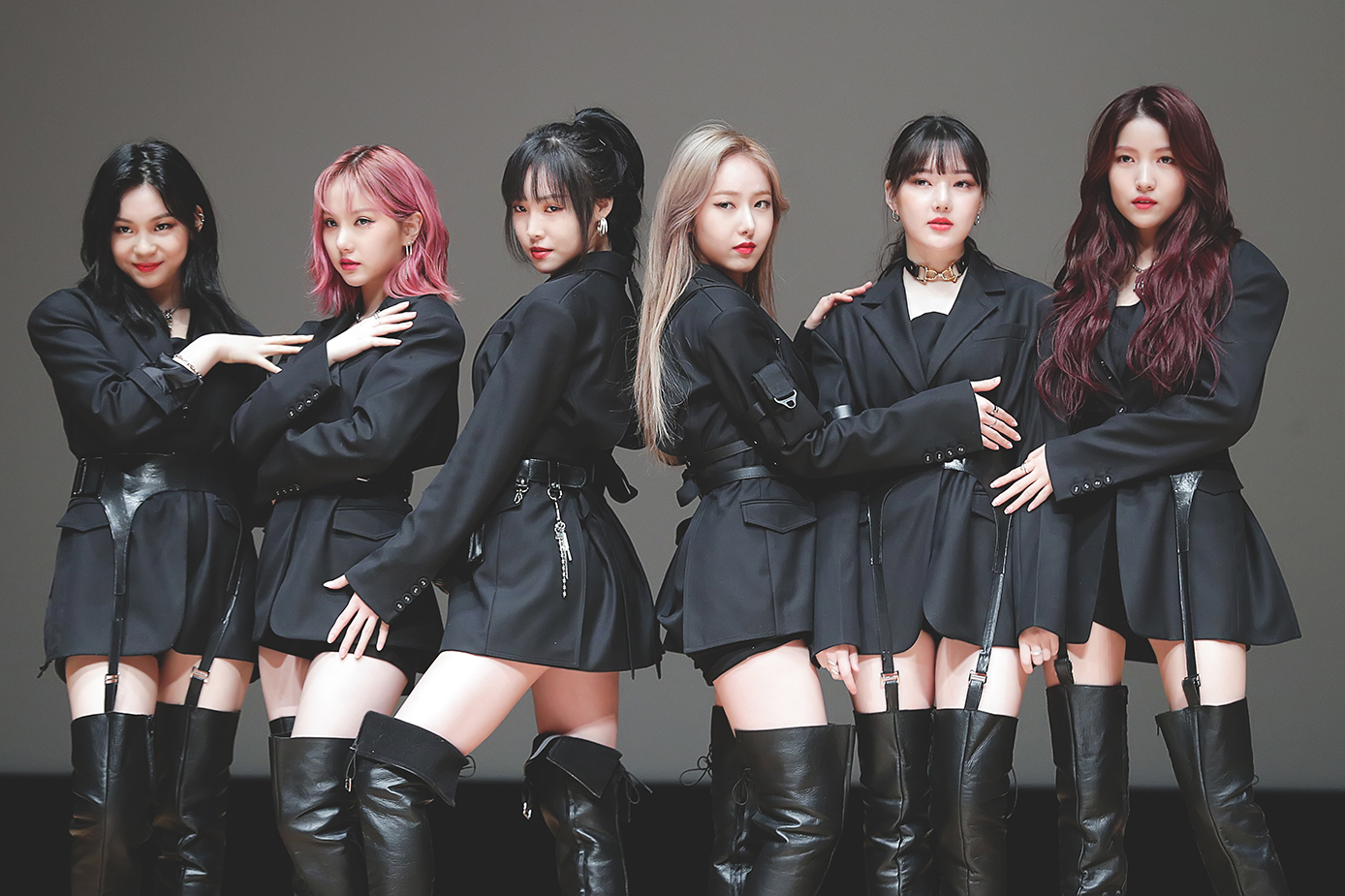
- GFriend in February 2020; From left to right: Umji, Eunha, Yuju, SinB, Yerin, and Sowon

Background information
- Origin: Seoul, South Korea
- Genre: K-pop
- Years active: 2015–2021; 2024–2025
- Labels: Source; King
- Members: Sowon; Yerin; Eunha; Yuju; SinB; Umji

GFriend (stylized in all caps; Korean: 여자친구; RR: Yeojachingu; lit. 'Girlfriend') is a South Korean girl group formed by Source Music in 2015. The group consists of six members: Sowon, Yerin, Eunha, Yuju, SinB, and Umji. They debuted with the extended play (EP) Season of Glass on January 15, 2015, and won several female rookie awards, garnering momentum early on despite being from a small company.

GFriend continued their commercial success in the next year with their third EP, Snowflake, whose lead single "Rough" won first place on numerous music shows. They released their first studio album, LOL, in 2016 as well. In 2017, GFriend returned with their fourth EP, The Awakening, for which pre-orders exceeded 100,000 copies. The same year, the group released their fifth EP, Parallel, which was re-issued one month later under the title Rainbow.

In 2018, GFriend released their sixth EP, Time for the Moon Night, and the special EP Sunny Summer. They also made their official Japanese debut with the compilation album GFriend 1st Best, held their first concert, and embarked on their first Asian tour. In 2019, GFriend released their second studio album, Time For Us, and their seventh EP, Fever Season. The group's final releases were part of the "回" series in 2020, which included two EPs and their third studio album. That year, GFriend became the first-ever girl group to be interviewed for the Grammy Mini Masterclass. The group was disbanded on May 22, 2021, after all members left Source Music upon the conclusion of their contracts. Eunha, SinB, and Umji later formed the group Viviz in 2022 after signing with BPM Entertainment.

In September 2024, it was announced that the group would reunite in 2025 to celebrate their tenth anniversary. The group's reunion project, a single album entitled Season of Memories, was released on January 13, 2025, followed by a concert tour.

== History ==
=== 2015: Debut with Season of Glass, Flower Bud and rise in popularity ===
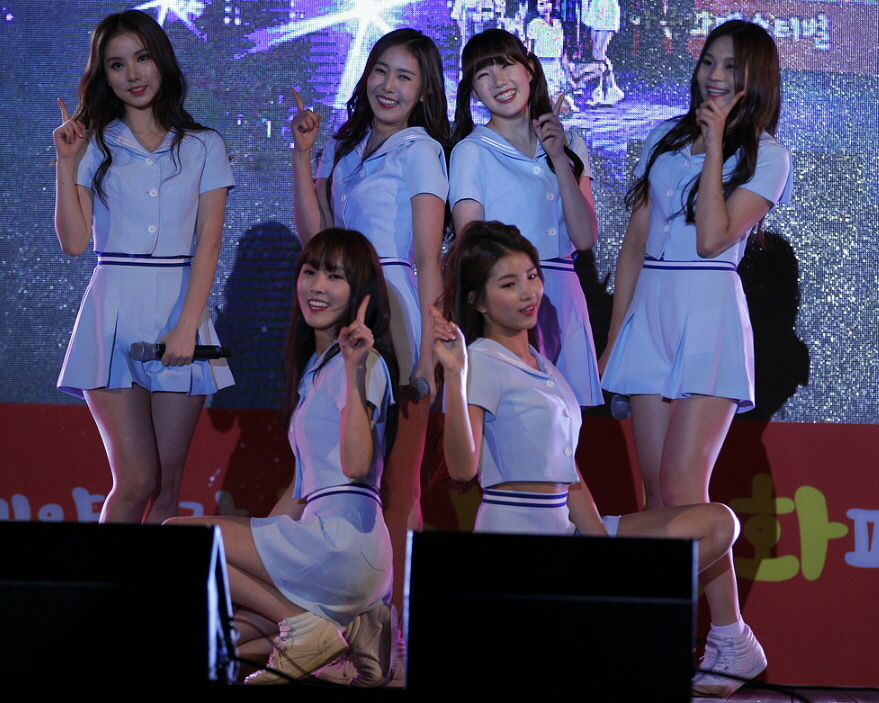
GFriend in 2015

On January 15, 2015, GFriend released their five-track debut extended play (EP), Season of Glass. The lead single "Glass Bead" was composed by Seo Yong-bae and Iggy, and the album debuted at number twelve on Gaon's weekly chart. The group began album promotions on January 16 on KBS' Music Bank. According to YouTube, the music video for "Glass Bead" ranked number nine on their list of the ten "Most Viewed K-Pop Videos Around the World in January 2015". On January 28, 2015, Billboard named GFriend one of "Top 5 K-Pop Artists to Watch in 2015".

GFriend released their second EP Flower Bud and the music video for lead single "Me Gustas Tu" on July 23. GFriend began promoting on the same date as the album release on Mnet's M Countdown. The group garnered international attention after a fan-taken video of the members continuing a performance of "Me Gustas Tu" despite the slippery stage went viral in September. GFriend was praised for their professionalism, especially Yuju, who fell five times and suffered a twisted finger during the performance. They were the only girl group nominated in the 2015 MTV Europe Music Awards "Best Korean Act" category alongside boy groups B1A4, BTS, Got7, and VIXX. "Me Gustas Tu" entered the Gaon Year-End Top 100 chart as the 38th best selling song of 2015. "Me Gustas Tu" and "Glass Bead" were also ranked 18th and 44th, respectively, in the 2015 Bugs Year-End Top 100.

=== 2016: Snowflake, first music show wins, Showtime and LOL ===
On January 25, 2016, GFriend released their third EP, Snowflake, led by the single "Rough". "Rough" was the last song in GFriend's high school concept trilogy, along with "Glass Bead" and "Me Gustas Tu". GFriend began promotions for Snowflake on January 26 on SBS MTV's The Show. Snowflake debuted at number ten on he Billboard World Albums Chart, and the music video of "Rough" on YouTube ranked at number three in the top ten "Most Viewed K-Pop Videos Around the World in January 2016".

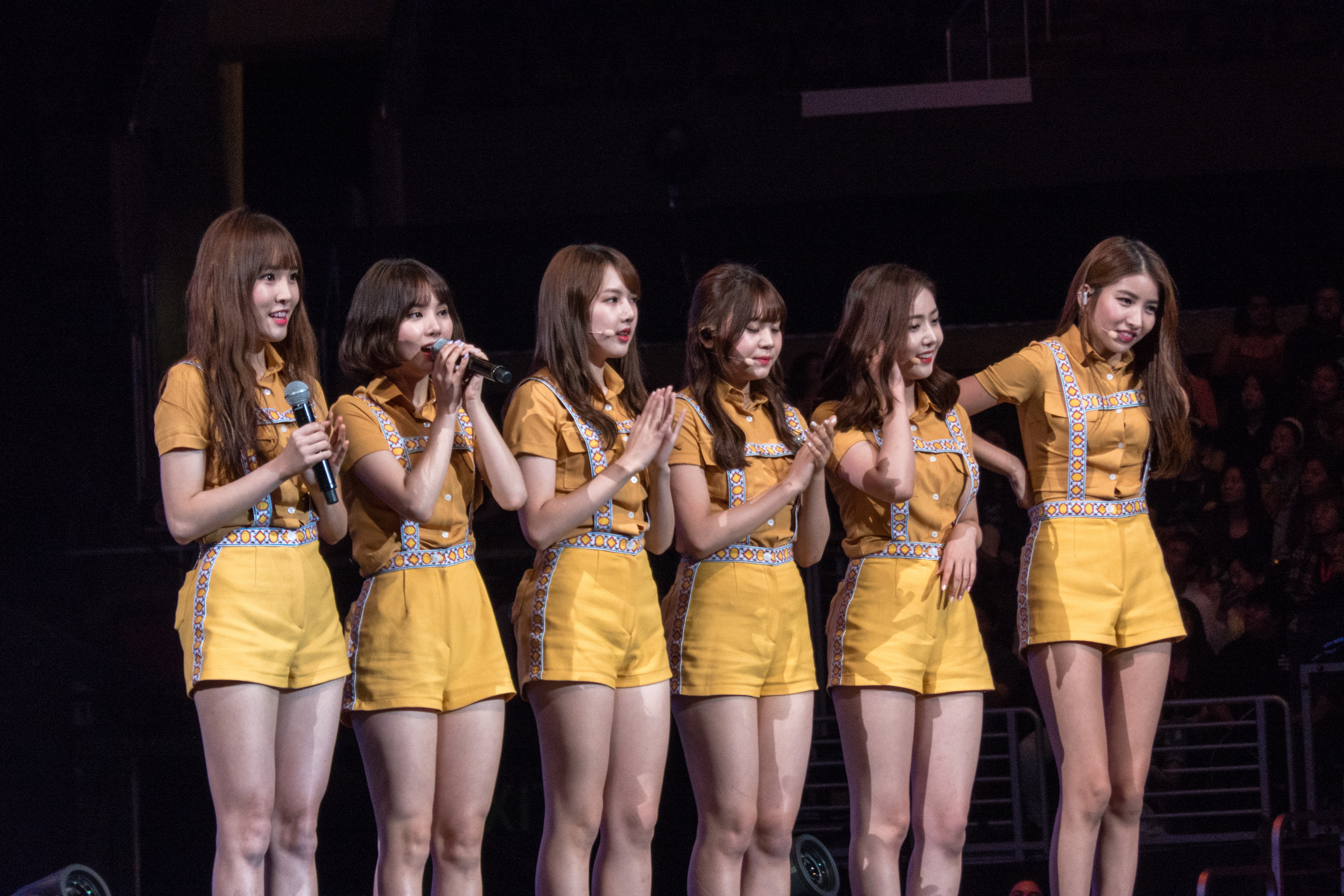
GFriend on stage during KCON16 LA, on July 30, 2016

On February 2, GFriend received their first music show win for their song "Rough" on The Show. They went on to win another fourteen awards on the music shows, including their first triple crowns on M Countdown, Music Bank, Show Champion, and Inkigayo. With a total of 15 wins, they placed second in the number of wins for girls groups, behind Apink who recorded a total of 17 wins with "Luv". The song "Rough" also placed first in Gaon Chart's First Half of 2016 chart rankings.

On June 15, it was announced that GFriend would star alongside Mamamoo in a new season of Showtime. On June 29, Source Music began preparations for the release of the group's first studio album, LOL, which stands for both "Laughing Out Loud" and "Lots of Love". LOL was released on July 11 with the lead single "Navillera", having accumulated more than 60,000 pre-orders worldwide. On July 19, GFriend earned their first music show win for "Navillera" on The Show.

At the end of the year, YouTube revealed the top 10 K-pop MVs most beloved by South Koreans in 2016; "Rough" and "Navillera" were ranked second and tenth, respectively. "Rough" and "Navillera" were also ranked second and eleventh, respectively, in the 2016 Bugs Year-End Top 100. "Rough" ranked 13th in Billboard's 20 Best K-Pop Songs of 2016: Critic's Picks. At the end of the year show 2016 KBS Song Festival, the peak viewer ratings for the whole show were recorded during GFriend's "Rough" performance at 10.3%. "Rough" also became the most downloaded song in 2016, according to Gaon Chart's 2016 Year End Download Chart.

=== 2017: First fan-meeting, The Awakening, Parallel and Rainbow ===
On February 23, 2017, Source Music announced that GFriend would make a comeback on March 6. On February 27, it was revealed that their fourth EP would be titled The Awakening with lead single "Fingertip". The Awakening global pre-orders exceeded 100,000 copies, a new personal record. Additionally, the album debuted at fifth on Billboard's World Albums chart.

In April, GFriend held their first fan meeting, "Dear Buddy".

On August 1, GFriend released their fifth EP, Parallel, with lead single "Love Whisper". In September, they released the repackaged version of the album Rainbow with the lead single "Summer Rain".

=== 2018: First solo concert, Time for the Moon Night, Japanese debut, Sunny Summer and "Memoria" ===
GFriend opened the year with their first solo concert, "Season of GFriend", on January 6 and 7, 2018. GFriend signed with King Records.

Their sixth EP, Time for the Moon Night, debuted on top the Download, Album & Social charts on Gaon, selling more than 84,000 copies in domestically. The following week, it was reported that the group tied with Girls' Generation and Twice as the girl groups with the most entries in the Top 10 of the Billboard World Albums Chart, with five each. In the second week of album promotions, GFriend won six awards on music programs, making "Time for the Moon Night" the first song of 2018 to win all prizes at musical programs.

In late May, the group promoted their compilation album Kyō Kara Watashitachi wa ~ GFriend 1st Best ~ in Japan, which was released on May 23. GFriend Japanese debut album peak at number 10 on the Oricon weekly album chart.

On July 19, GFriend released a summer EP, Sunny Summer. they made a debut in Billboard's Social 50 chart at number 30, one week after the release of the album.

On October 10, GFriend released their first Japanese single album, "Memoria /夜 (Time for the moon night)". It debuted at number six on the Oricon weekly singles chart and five on the Billboard Japan weekly top singles sales.

=== 2019: Time for Us, back-to-back Japanese singles, Fever Season and Fallin' Light ===
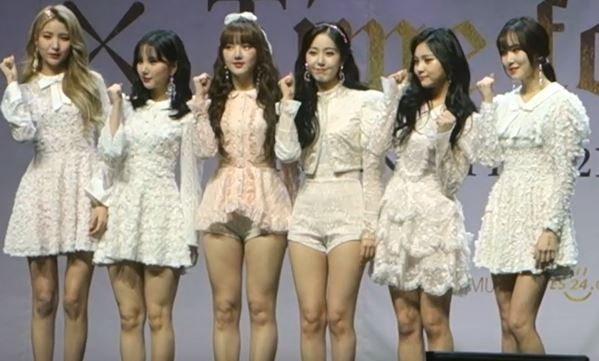
GFriend during the showcase of Time for Us on January 14, 2019

On January 14, 2019, GFriend released their second studio album, Time for Us, with lead single "Sunrise". It became the group's highest selling Korean album, with more than 86,000 copies sold on Gaon. On February 13, the group released their second Japanese single album, "Sunrise (JP ver.)/La Pam Pam". On March 13, they released their third Japanese single album, "Flower/Beautiful".

On July 1, GFriend released their seventh EP, Fever Season, with lead single "Fever". The EP consisted of eight tracks, including an instrumental version of their lead single. The group also promoted in Japan by collaborating with Japanese pop group Sonar Pocket and released Japanese single album Oh Difficult – Sonar Pocket×GFriend on July 3.

On November 13, GFriend released their first Japanese studio album, Fallin' Light, with a lead single of the same name. The album also contained all of their previous Japanese songs since "Memoria", as well as new tracks.

=== 2020–2021: "回" series and disbandment ===
On February 3, 2020, GFriend released their eighth EP, 回:Labyrinth, with lead single "Crossroads". It marked the group's first Korean comeback since the acquisition of Source Music by Big Hit Entertainment in 2019.

Their ninth EP, 回:Song of the Sirens, was released on July 13 with the lead single "Apple".

On October 14, the group released 回:Labyrinth ~Crossroads~, containing Japanese versions of "Crossroads" and "Labyrinth". It was followed by 回:Song of the Sirens ~Apple~ on October 21, containing Japanese versions of "Apple" and "Tarot Cards". GFriend's third studio album, 回:Walpurgis Night, was released on November 9, with lead single "Mago".

On May 22, 2021, all six members left Source Music upon the end of their contracts, and the group officially disbanded. Eunha, SinB, and Umji later formed the group Viviz in 2022, after signing with BPM Entertainment.

=== 2024–present: Reunion for tenth-anniversary project ===
On September 24, 2024, Source Music confirmed that the members of GFriend would be reuniting in January 2025 for a special project to celebrate their tenth anniversary.

Sowon performed GFriend songs at her first solo Asia fan meeting on October 26. Ahead of her fan meeting, Sowon characterized the group's reunion through a video on her YouTube channel: "Whatever it may be, a reunion… we never really disbanded. I've been waiting for four years to perform on stage again, so I'm really happy."

In November 2024, Ilgan Sports reported that January 2025's "special project" would be an album, but the size and concept had yet to be determined.

Season of Memories, a special album celebrating GFriend's tenth anniversary, was announced on December 2, 2024. The album was released on January 13, 2025, preceded by the pre-release single of the same name on January 6. The group also held three concerts at Olympic Hall, Seoul on January 17 to 19, and also held four other concerts in Asia in March.

== Ambassadorship ==
In 2019, Shopee Indonesia named GFriend their 2019 Global K-Market Ambassador. The group had great contribution to the brand's K-Wave net shares, helping achieve an eightfold increase in their Korean sales on the platform and earn first place for Indonesia and seventh place worldwide in the Best Brand Category of the 2019 Top Brand Buzz Awards.

== Legal matters ==
=== Lawsuit against clothing company ===
On December 28, 2016, GFriend won a partial lawsuit against a clothing company for using their photographs without permission to promote its products. The company had provided clothing for a magazine shoot in April 2015 but later used the images on its website for advertising. The group sought ₩60 million (US$44,766.9) in damages, citing violations of personal rights and potential impacts on future advertising. The Seoul Central District Court ruled against the company's defence of claiming that using photographs of models wearing its products was common practice in sponsorship arrangements, stating that such a defence do not allow unauthorized commercial use of images. The court ordered the company to pay ₩18 million (US$13,430.07) in compensation.

== Members ==
- Sowon (소원) — leader
- Yerin (예린)
- Eunha (은하)
- Yuju (유주)
- SinB (신비)
- Umji (엄지)

== Discography ==
=== Korean albums ===
- LOL (2016)
- Time for Us (2019)
- 回:Walpurgis Night (2020)

=== Japanese albums ===
- Fallin' Light (2019)

== Filmography ==
=== Reality shows ===
Year	Title	Notes	Ref.
2015	GFriend! Look After Our Dog	12 episodes	
2015	One Fine Day	Filmed on Cebu, Philippines, 4 episodes	
2016	GFriend – Where R U Going?!	Filmed on Jeju Island, 7 episodes	
2016	Mamamoo x GFriend Showtime	8 episodes	
2016	GFriend Loves Europe	Filmed in Austria, Hungary, and Slovenia, 8 episodes	
2017	The Friends in Adriatic Sea	Filmed in Italy and Slovenia, 5 episodes	
2019	GFriend Summer Vacation in Okinawa	Filmed in Okinawa, Japan, 10 episodes	
2020	GFriend's Memoria	Season 1 filmed in Chuncheon, 4 episodes	
2020	GFriend's Memoria Season 2	Season 2 filmed in YangYang Gaenmaeul Beach, 6 episodes	
2020	GFriend's Memoria <ONE HALF #1>	3 episodes	
2020	GFriend's Memoria Season 3	Season 3 filmed in Gapyeong Hanok Village, 7 episodes	
2020	GFriend's Memoria Season 4	Season 4 filmed in Buddy High School with Variety Show Concept, 3 episodes	
2021	GFriend's Memoria – New Year's Party	2 episodes	
2021	GFriend's Memoria – The Cooking Show	Variety Show Concept, 2 episodes	
2021	GFriend's Memoria – Detective GFriend	Variety Show Concept, 2 episodes	
2021	GFriend's Memoria – Talk Show	2 episodes	
2021	GFriend's Memoria – Home Together	3 episodes	
2021	GFriend's Memoria – Game Friend	Variety Show Concept, 2 episodes	

=== DVDs & Blu-ray ===
- GFriend – Where R U Going? (2016)
- 2016 Season's Greetings
- 2017 Season's Greetings
- 2018 Season's Greetings
- 2018 GFRIEND 1st Concert "Season of GFriend" (2018)
- 2019 Season's Greetings "Be In Full Bloom"
- 2018 GFRIEND 1st Concert ENCORE "Season of Gfriend" (2019)
- GFriend 1st Photo Book "여자친구" (2019)
- 2020 Season's Greetings
- 2019 GFRIEND ASIA TOUR in Seoul Go Go GFRIEND! (2020)
- GFriend 2nd Photo Book (CHOICE) (2020)
- 2021 Season's Greetings

== Concert and tours ==
=== Online concerts ===
- GFriend Online Concert: GFriend C:ON (2020)

=== Asia tours ===
==== GFriend 1st Asia Tour: Season of GFriend (2018) ====
Concert dates
Date	City	Country	Venue	Attendance
January 6, 2018	Seoul	South Korea	Olympic Hall	6,000
January 7, 2018	Seoul	South Korea	Olympic Hall	6,000
February 28, 2018	New Taipei City	Taiwan	Xinzhuang Gymnasium	5,000
August 2, 2018	Osaka	Japan	Namba Hatch	—N/a
August 5, 2018	Tokyo	Japan	Toyosu PIT	3,000
August 26, 2018	Quezon City	Philippines	Kia Theatre	—N/a
September 1, 2018	Hong Kong		Kowloonbay International Trade & Exhibition Centre	—N/a
September 8, 2018	Seoul	South Korea	SK Olympic Handball Gymnasium	8,000
September 9, 2018	Seoul	South Korea	SK Olympic Handball Gymnasium	8,000

- The two concerts held in Japan were called "Summer Live in Japan 2018" due to their Japanese debut promotions. The concerts were part of their Asia Tour.

==== GFriend 2nd Asia Tour: Go Go GFriend! (2019) ====
Concert dates
Date	City	Country	Venue	Attendance
May 18, 2019	Seoul	South Korea	SK Olympic Handball Gymnasium	40,000
May 19, 2019	Seoul	South Korea	SK Olympic Handball Gymnasium	40,000
June 29, 2019	Kuala Lumpur	Malaysia	Malawati Indoor Stadium	40,000
July 20, 2019	Singapore		The Star Performing Arts Centre	40,000
July 27, 2019	Bangkok	Thailand	BCC Hall	40,000
August 3, 2019	Hong Kong		AsiaWorld–Expo	40,000
August 23, 2019	Jakarta	Indonesia	The Kasablanka Hall	40,000
August 25, 2019	Quezon City	Philippines	New Frontier Theater	40,000
August 31, 2019	Taoyuan	Taiwan	NTSU Arena	40,000
November 17, 2019	Yokohama	Japan	Pacifico Yokohama	40,000

==== GFriend 10th Anniversary Concert: Season of Memories (2025) ====
Concert dates
Date	City	Country	Venue	Attendance
January 17, 2025	Seoul	South Korea	Olympic Hall	9,000
January 18, 2025	Seoul	South Korea	Olympic Hall	9,000
January 19, 2025	Seoul	South Korea	Olympic Hall	9,000
March 9, 2025	Osaka	Japan	Zepp Osaka Bayside	—N/a
March 11, 2025	Yokohama	Japan	KT Zepp Yokohama	—N/a
March 14, 2025	Hong Kong		AsiaWorld-Expo, Runway 11	—N/a
March 22, 2025	Kaohsiung	Taiwan	Kaohsiung Music Center	—N/a
March 23, 2025	Kaohsiung	Taiwan	Kaohsiung Music Center	—N/a
March 29, 2025	Taipei	Taiwan	Taipei Music Center	—N/a
March 30, 2025	Taipei	Taiwan	Taipei Music Center	—N/a

=== Japan tours ===
==== GFriend Spring Tour 2019: Bloom (2019) ====
Concert dates
Date	City	Country	Venue	Attendance
March 3, 2019	Osaka	Japan	Zepp Osaka Bayside	—N/a
March 15, 2019	Nagoya	Japan	Zepp Nagoya	—N/a
March 20, 2019	Tokyo	Japan	Toyosu PIT	6,000
March 21, 2019	Tokyo	Japan	Toyosu PIT	6,000

=== Concert participations ===
- 2021 New Year's Eve Live presented by Weverse (2020)

== Awards and nominations ==
GFriend got their first-ever major award for their debut extended play Season of Glass, released in January 2015, as the "Best New Female Artist" at Melon Music Awards on November 7, 2015. The group also won several new artist awards between late 2015 to early 2016, including at the 5th Gaon Chart Music Awards, the 30th Golden Disc Awards and the 25th Seoul Music Awards.

Their first music show win was on The Show with "Rough" on February 2, 2016, after which the group went on to receive a total of 15 music show wins during the song's promotion. During their "Navillera" promotions they got a total of 14 music show wins, making them the girl group with most wins gained within a year with a total of 29 wins.

The group's third extended play Snowflake single "Rough" won the group several awards between late 2016 to early 2017, including Song of the Year – January at the 7th Gaon Chart Music Awards. The single also won the Best Dance award and Digital Bonsang award at the 2016 Melon Music Awards, the 2016 Mnet Asian Music Awards and the 31st Golden Disc Awards, respectively. In 2020, Dingo Music has given them a "Special Grand Prize" trophy for their exemplary contribution for the Original Contents created by the channel throughout the years.
