= Kim So-won =

South Korean singer and actress (born 1995)

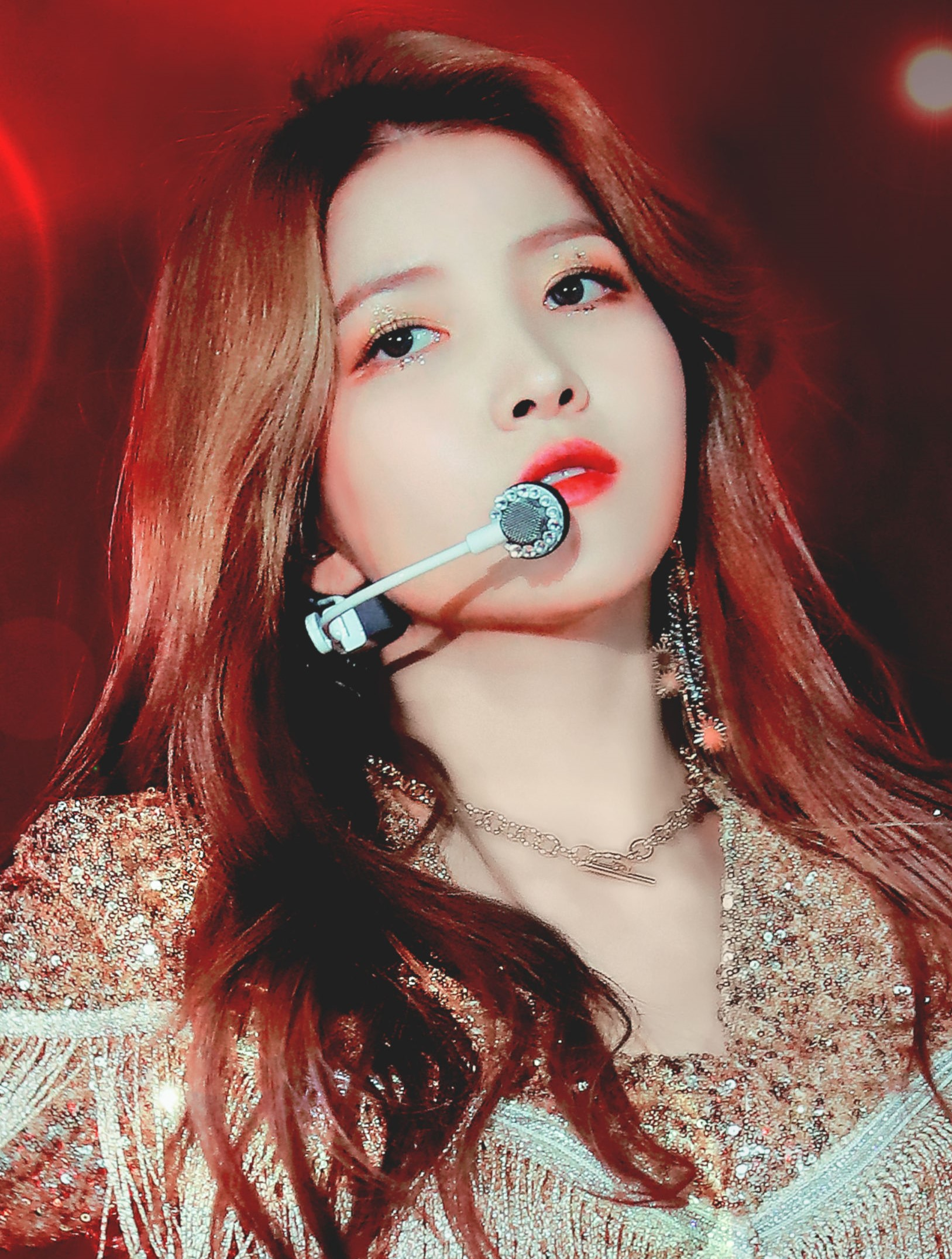
- Kim in 2019
- Born: Kim So-jeong; December 7, 1995 (age 30); Seoul, South Korea
- Education: Sungshin Women's University – Department of Media and Film Acting
- Occupations: Singer; actress
- Years active: 2015–present
- Agent: Haky Entertainment
- Musical career
- Also known as: Sowon
- Genre: K-pop
- Instrument: Vocals
- Years active: 2015–2021; 2024–2025
- Label: Source
- Member of: GFriend

Korean name
- Hangul: 김소정
- RR: Gim Sojeong
- MR: Kim Sojŏng

Stage name
- Hangul: 김소원
- RR: Gim Sowon
- MR: Kim Sowŏn

Kim So-jeong (Korean: 김소정; born December 7, 1995), known professionally as Kim So-won (김소원), is a South Korean singer and actress. She is best known as the leader of South Korean girl group GFriend.

== Early life and education ==
Kim was born on December 7, 1995, in Gupabal-dong, Eunpyeong District, Seoul, South Korea. She graduated from Hanlim Multi Arts High School in 2014, majored in modeling. She got accepted into the Department of Media and Film Acting at Sungshin Women's University in 2016.

== Career ==
=== 2010–2014: Pre-debut ===
Prior to debut, Kim trained with DSP Media for 4 years. After leaving DSP Media, she joined Source Music as trainee in 2013, where she trained for 1 year and 6 months before debuting as a member of GFriend.

=== 2015–2020: Debut with GFriend, solo activities and contract termination ===
On January 15, 2015, Kim debuted as a member and sub-vocal of South Korean girl group GFriend under the stage name Sowon with the released of EP Season of Glass.

On July 25, 2018, Kim was cast as the main host for MBC's Look at Me beauty program, marking her first time hosting a television program. On October 17, Kim made her debut as runway model for D-Antidote at S/S Hera Seoul Fashion Week 2019.

On May 18, 2021, Source Music announced that the agency and members of GFriend including Kim have agreed not to renew contracts. The group officially disbanded on May 22.

=== 2021–present: Acting career and other ventures ===
On August 2, 2021, it was announced that she has signed with IOK Company as an actress under her birth name. On September 30, she made her acting debut in the television film My Chilling Roommate alongside iKon's Jung Chan-woo. On December 1, Kim was cast in the short-form horror film 4:44 Seconds. The film is set to release on November 1, 2024.

On November 15, 2022, it was announced that Kim had signed a contract with Oui Entertainment, continuing her acting career under stage name "Kim So-won".

On August 8, 2024, Oui Entertainment announced that Kim would be leaving the company after agreeing not to renew her exclusive contract. On September 29, 2025, Kim signed a contract with Haky Entertainment. On November 13, 2025, Kim announced the launch of her own skincare brand Neovea, which was officially launched on November 17.

== Public image ==
Sowon has received attention for her beauty and physical fitness. On the Korea's Corporation Reputation Research Institution Monthly "Individual Girl Group Members Brand Power Ranking", Sowon placed number two on the January 2019 search and number 36 on the October 2019 search.

== Discography ==
=== Composition credits ===
All song credits are adapted from the Korea Music Copyright Association's database unless stated otherwise.

List of songs, showing year released, artist name, and name of the album
Title	Year	Artist	Album	Composer	Lyricist
"Hope"	2019	GFriend	Fever Season	No	Yes
"Better Me"	2020	GFriend	回:Walpurgis Night	Yes	Yes

== Filmography ==
=== Film ===
Year	Title	Role	Notes	Ref.
2024	Astro Boy	Cora	Voice-over for the Korean-dubbed version	
2024	4:44 Seconds	Choi Hee-young		

=== Television series ===
Year	Title	Role	Notes	Ref.
2022	My Chilling Roommate	Jung Se-ri	Television film	
2024–2025	Who Is She	Seo Chan-mi		
TBA	The Chain	TBA		

=== Television shows ===
Year	Title	Role	Notes	Ref.
2012	DSP BOYZ – Making the Star	Contestant	With A-Jax	
2018	Look at Me	Host		
2019	Trend by Me	Cast member		

=== Music videos appearances ===
Year	Title	Artist	Ref.
2011	"To Me" (내게로..)	Rainbow	
2022	"Endless Night" (긴밤)	Kim Min-jong	

== Awards and nominations ==
Name of the award ceremony, year presented, category, nominee of the award, and the result of the nomination
Award ceremony	Year	Category	Nominee(s) / Work(s)	Result	Ref.
Korea First Brand Awards (Note: Hosted by the Korea Consumer Brand Committee and the Korea Consumer Forum, the Korea First Brand Awards bases its winners on a nationwide South Korean survey.)	2018	Beauty Icon	Sowon	Won	
