= Walpurgis Night (album) =

- Digital and My Way version cover

Studio album by GFriend
- Released: November 9, 2020
- Studios: Source Music, Big Hit Studios
- Genres: K-pop; dance
- Length: 37:05
- Labels: Source; kakao M

GFriend chronology
Song of the Sirens (2020)	Walpurgis Night (2020)	Season of Memories (2025)

Singles from Walpurgis Night
- 1. "Mago" Released: November 9, 2020

Walpurgis Night (stylized as 回:Walpurgis Night) is the third Korean-language (fourth overall) studio album by South Korean girl group GFriend. It was released on November 9, 2020, by Source Music and distributed by Kakao M. The album contains 11 songs including the lead single "Mago". It was the group's final release before the conclusion of their contract with Source Music and disbandment in May 2021.

== Release and promotion ==
Logo used for promotion of 回:Walpurgis Night.

On October 12, 2020, it was reported that GFriend would come back on November 9 with a new studio album titled 回:Walpurgis Night. It's the third and last release of the series "回". Preorders began on October 19. On October 20, it was confirmed that the group will perform some tracks from the album in advance during their online concert GFriend C:ON on October 31. On October 24, the group released the checklist of their album. The tracklist of 回:Walpurgis Night was released two days later, including the lead single "Mago" as well as previous releases "Apple", "Crossroads" and "Labyrinth". On October 27, the first set of concept photos titled "My Way" were released. The second set titled "My Room" was released on October 28. Moving photos for "My Room" only were uploaded later on the same day. On October 29, Source Music released the last set of concept photos titled "My Girls". On October 31, the group revealed and performed in advance the sub-unit songs "Secret Diary", "Better Me" and "Night Drive" during their online concert GFriend C:ON. On the same day, members Eunha and Umji showcased a tip of the song and the choreography for "Mago" on the show Knowing Bros. On November 4, the highlight medley for the album was uploaded on HYBE Labels' YouTube channel. The first teaser for their lead single "Mago" was uploaded on the same channel on November 6. Two days later, the second teaser was released.

The album was released on November 9, The music video for "Mago" was released on the same day.

== Production and composition ==
For "Mago", Eunha, Yuju and Umji participated in composing and writing lyrics for the song.

"Secret Diary", "Better Me" and "Night Drive" are sub-unit songs, performed respectively by Yerin and SinB, by Sowon and Umji and by Eunha and Yuju. Each of the members participated in composing and writing lyrics for their respective song.

The songs "Apple", "Crossroads" and "Labyrinth" were previously released from the prior '回' album series, with the tracks having updated harmonies during the choruses. These versions of the songs are not found on the iTunes version of the album, but rather are on the physical release of the CD.

== Critical reception ==
Beats Per Minute called Walpurgis Night as "a bold, vibrant and occasionally experimental album that finds GFriend shedding the melancholy of their previous two releases." It gave the album a score of 68%, evaluating it as "a daring reinvention that adds new dimensions to their discography. However, the group haven't fully veered away from what has made them one of the most distinguished groups in K-pop, and what makes this album special is how they have reserved their bright energy for internal healing and liberation, but still keep romance in their peripheral vision."

IZM gave Walpurgis Night 3 out of 5 stars, stating that, aside from a slight sense of incongruity, "the good melody, which were the center of the team, is safely inherited" in GFriend's new path; however, it found that the '回' trilogy clashed with the group's previous releases, "trying to burn too many stories and excessive intervention that does not seem to take into account the existing identity."

Walpurgis Night on rankings
Publication	List	Rank	Ref.
SCMP	The Top15 Albums from K-pop Groups in 2020		
Time	The Albums That Defined K-Pop's Monumental Year in 2020		
Rolling Stone India	10 Best K-pop Albums of 2020	4	

== Track listing ==
No.	Title	Writer(s)	Producer(s)	Length
1.	"Mago (Note: "Mago" is stylized in all caps.)"	FRANTS; "hitman" bang; Kyler Niko; Paulina “Pau” Cerrilla; Eunha; Cho Yoon-kyung; Yuju; Alice Vicious; Cazzi Opeia; Ellen Berg; Jaded Jane; Noisy Citizen; Justin Reinstein; JJean; Umji	FRANTS	3:19
2.	"Love Spell"	FRANTS; Maria Marcus; "hitman" bang; Misung (VoidheaD); ZNEE (Flying Lab)	FRANTS	3:08
3.	"Three of Cups"	Noh Joo-hwan; Lee Won-jong; Kim Jung-woo; Mayu Wakisaka	Noh Joo-hwan; Lee Won-jong	3:28
4.	"GRWM"	Son Young-jin (MosPick); Yeahnice (MosPick); Ferdy (MosPick); JayJay (MosPick)	MosPick	3:30
5.	"Secret Diary" (performed by Yerin and SinB)	Noh Joo-hwan; Woong Kim; Andreas Öberg; Simon Petrén; Yerin; SinB	Noh Joo-hwan	3:13
6.	"Better Me" (performed by Sowon and Umji)	SCORE (13); MEGATONE (13); LUKE (13); Umji; Sowon	13	3:01
7.	"Night Drive" (performed by Eunha and Yuju)	Noh Joo-hwan; Yuju; Eunha	Noh Joo-hwan	3:27
8.	"Apple (Note: "Apple" is the previous lead single of the group from the EP 回:Song of the Sirens.)"	FRANTS; Pdogg; "hitman" bang; Hwang Hyun (MonoTree); Eunha; Hannah Robinson; Richard Phillips; Alex Nese; Chendy; Yuju; Noh Joo-hwan; Kim Jin (Makeumine Works); Gu Yeo-reum (Makeumine Works); Lee Seu-ran	FRANTS; Pdogg; "hitman" bang	3:27
9.	"Crossroads (Note: "Crossroads" and "Labyrinth" are previous releases of the group from the EP 回:Labyrinth.)" (교차로; Gyocharo)	Noh Joo-hwan; Lee Won-jong	Noh Joo-hwan; Lee Won-jong	3:23
10.	"Labyrinth"	Noh Joo-hwan; "hitman" bang; Lee Won-jong; Kim Jung-woo; FRANTS; Sophia Pae; Carlos K; ADORA; Cho Yoon-kyung; Kim Yeon-seo	Noh Joo-hwan; "hitman" bang; Lee Won-jong	3:21
11.	"Wheel of the Year" (앞면의 뒷면의 뒷면; Ammyeon-ui dwinmyeon-ui dwinmyeon: lit. The front's back's back)	Hwang Hyun (MonoTree); Mayu Wakisaka	Hwang Hyun (MonoTree)	3:48
Total length:				37:05

== Charts ==
=== Weekly charts ===
Weekly chart performance for 回:Walpurgis Night
Chart (2020)	Peak position
South Korean Albums (Gaon)	3

=== Monthly charts ===
Monthly chart performance for 回:Walpurgis Night
Chart (2020)	Peak position
South Korean Albums (Gaon)	19

== Release history ==
Release dates and formats for 回:Walpurgis Night
Region	Date	Format	Label	Ref.
Various	November 9, 2020	CD; digital download; streaming	Source Music; kakao M	
