= Yerin (entertainer) =

South Korean singer and actress (born 1996)

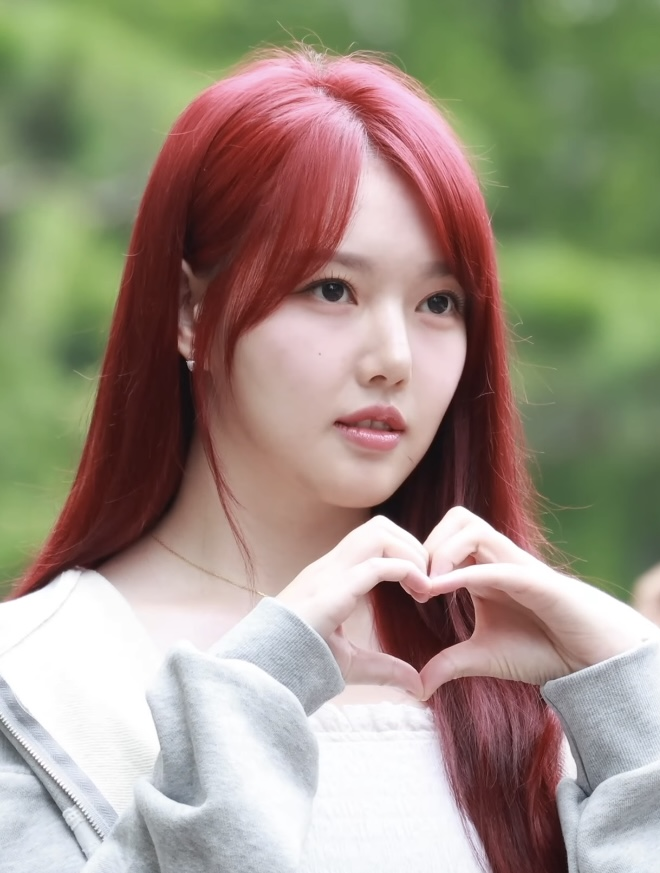
- Yerin in 2024
- Born: Jung Ye-rin; August 19, 1996 (age 30); Incheon, South Korea
- Education: School of Performing Arts Seoul
- Occupations: Singer; actress
- Musical career
- Genre: K-pop
- Instrument: Vocals
- Years active: 2015–present
- Labels: Source Music; Sublime; Bill; A-Side
- Member of: GFriend

Korean name
- Hangul: 정예린
- RR: Jeong Yerin
- MR: Chŏng Yerin

Jung Ye-rin (Korean: 정예린; born August 19, 1996), known mononymously as Yerin (예린), is a South Korean singer and actress. She is a member of the South Korean girl group GFriend and is currently active as a soloist.

== Early life ==
Yerin was born on August 19, 1996, in Incheon. She attended the School of Performing Arts Seoul and graduated in 2015.

== Career ==
=== 2015–2021: Activities with GFriend ===
In January 2015, Yerin officially debuted as a member of GFriend with their first extended play, Season of Glass. She made her acting debut two months later playing a supporting role in the web drama Midnight's Girl. On April 13, 2015, she appeared in Super Junior Heechul and TRAX Jungmo unit M&D's music video "I Wish".

In January 2016, Yerin was chosen as a new MC for SBS MTV's music program The Show, alongside Zhou Mi. On October 17, 2016, she featured the song "Future Boyfriend" with El Camino.

In 2017, Yerin collaborated with Cao Lu and Kisum on the single "Spring Again". Later that year, she participated in SBS's reality-documentary show Law of the Jungle, featuring in the episodes in Komodo.

=== 2021–present: Solo activities ===
In June 2021, Yerin signed with Sublime Artist Agency as a solo artist and actress.

In February 2022, Yerin hosted an entertainment show of MBN "Catch Job" with broadcaster Cho Woo-Jong. In May 2022, Yerin made her solo debut with the extended play Aria. She is set to be an MC in MBC's Crazy Encounter Season 4.

On March 31, 2023, Sublime Artist Agency announced that Yerin would be leaving the company after deciding not to renew her exclusive contract. On April 17, Bill Entertainment announced that Yerin signed an exclusive contract with the agency. Additionally on June 21, they announced that she would be coming back with her second solo album. Her second EP Ready, Set, Love was released on August 23.

On August 13, 2024, it was announced that Yerin would be releasing her third EP Rewrite on September 4.

In 2025, Yerin signed an exclusive contract with A-Side Company, before releasing her first digital single "Awake" on September 24.

On May 26, 2026, A-Side Company announced that Yerin's fourth EP Reach You would be released on June 9.

== Discography ==
=== Extended plays ===
List of extended plays, showing selected details, selected chart positions, and sales figures
Title	Details	Peak chart positions	Sales
Title	Details	KOR	Sales
Aria	Released: May 18, 2022; Label: Sublime; Formats: CD, digital download, streaming; Track listing: 1. "Intro: Bloom"; 2. "Aria"; 3. "Believer"; 4. "Lalala"; 5. "Time" (시간)	8	KOR: 41,303
Ready, Set, Love	Released: August 23, 2023; Label: Bill Entertainment; Formats: CD, digital download, streaming; Track listing: 1. "Bambambam" (밤밤밤); 2. "Summer Charm" (루프탑); 3. "The Dance"; 4. "Bambambam" (밤밤밤; Inst.)	18	KOR: 13,645
Rewrite	Released: September 4, 2024; Label: Bill Entertainment; Formats: CD, digital download, streaming; Track listing: 1. "Wavy"; 2. "Shine" (볕뉘); 3. "Permeate"; 4. "Save Me"; 5. "One Thing" (featuring Kim Da-yeon (Kep1er)); 6. "4U"	30	KOR: 9,040
Reach You	Released: June 9, 2026; Label: A-Side; Formats: CD, digital download, streaming; Track listing: 1. "Polaris"; 2. "Shooting Star" (조각별); 3. "Spring Glow" 춘곤 (春困); 4. "Orbit"; 5. "Shooting Star" (조각별; Inst.)	22	KOR: 6,136

=== Single albums ===
List of single albums, showing selected details, selected chart positions, and sales figures
Title	Details	Peak chart positions	Sales
Title	Details	KOR	Sales
Awake	Released: September 24, 2025; Label: A-Side; Formats: Digital download, streaming; Track listing: 1. "Awake"; 2. "Awake" (Instrumental)	23	KOR: 4,248

=== Singles ===
List of singles, showing year released, selected chart positions, sales figures, and name of the album
Title	Year	Peak chart positions	Sales (DL)	Album
Title	Year	KOR	Sales (DL)	Album
As lead artist
"Aria"	2022	— (Note: "Aria" did not enter the Gaon Digital Chart, but peaked at number 46 on the Download Chart.)	—N/a	Aria
"Bambambam" (밤밤밤)	2023	— (Note: "Bambambam" did not enter the Circle Digital Chart, but peaked at number 48 on the Download Chart.)	—N/a	Ready, Set, Love
"Wavy"	2024	— (Note: "Wavy" did not enter the Circle Digital Chart, but peaked at number 67 on the Download Chart.)	—N/a	Rewrite
"Awake"	2025	— (Note: "Awake" did not enter the Circle Digital Chart, but peaked at number 121 on the Download Chart.)	—N/a	Awake
"Shooting Star" (조각별)	2026	— (Note: "Shooting Star" did not enter the Circle Digital Chart, but peaked at number 75 on the Download Chart.)	—N/a	Reach You
Collaborations
"Spring Again" (왜 또 봄이야) (with Cao Lu, Kisum)	2017	37	KOR: 82,419	Non-album singles
"Colors" (with Youngjae)	2022	—	—N/a	Non-album singles
As featured artist
"Future Boyfriend" (미남) (El Camino featuring Yerin)	2016	—	—N/a	Non-album singles
"Sorry for Loving You" (Gree featuring Yerin)	2021	—	—N/a	Non-album singles
"—" denotes a recording that did not chart or was not released in that territory N/A denotes data that are not available.

=== Soundtrack appearances ===
List of soundtracks, showing year released, and name of the album
Title	Year	Album
"Spring"	2022	Good Job OST Part 4
"All I Need Is You" (너만 있으면) (with Song I-han)	2023	The Witch Store Reopens OST Part 3

=== Other charted songs ===
Title	Year	Peak chart positions	Album
Title	Year	KOR Down.	Album
"Believer"	2022	134	Aria
"Lalala"	2022	146	Aria
"Time" (시간)	2022	145	Aria

=== Composition credits ===
All song credits are adapted from the Korea Music Copyright Association's database unless stated otherwise.

Title	Year	Album	Artist	Composer	Lyricist	Arranger
"Hope"	2019	Fever Season	GFriend	No	Yes	No
"Secret Diary"	2020	回:Walpurgis Night	GFriend	Yes	Yes	Yes

== Videography ==
=== Music videos ===
Title	Year	Director(s)	Ref.
"Aria"	2022	Kim Young-jo, Yoo Seung-woo (Naive)	
"Bambambam" (밤밤밤)	2023	Kim Byung-joon (Maybe More That)	
"Wavy"	2024	Unknown	
"Awake"	2025	Jang Soha (Gudalsfilm)	
"Shooting Star" (조각별)	2026	Han Sangbum (IOFX MMC Production)	

== Filmography ==
=== Film ===
Year	Title	Role	Notes	Ref.
2023	New Normal	Hae-kyung	Closing film at 26th BIFFF	

=== Web series ===
Year	Title	Role	Ref.
2015	Midnight's Girl	Ye Eun	
2023	The Witch Store Reopening	Lee Hae-na	
2024	Sea Village Cloud Pension	Gu Ru-mi	

=== Television shows ===
Year	Title	Role	Ref.
2016	The Show	MC	
2021	Beauty Time 3	Cast member	
2022	Catch Job	MC	
2022	My House Sangjeon	Cast member	
2022	Crazy Encounter Season 4	MC	

=== Web shows ===
Year	Title	Role	Ref.
2022	Sing in the Green	Cast member	

=== Radio shows ===
Year	Title	Role	Ref.
2021	On Air Spin-off	DJ	
2022	Got7's Youngjae's Best Friend	Special DJ	
