= Umji =

South Korean singer (born 1998)

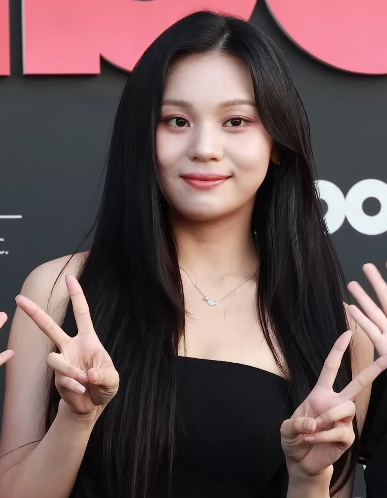
- Umji in August 2024
- Born: Kim Ye-won; August 19, 1998 (age 28); Incheon, South Korea
- Occupations: Singer; dancer
- Musical career
- Genre: K-pop
- Instrument: Vocals
- Years active: 2015–present
- Labels: Source; BPM; Uncore
- Member of: GFriend; Viviz

Korean name
- Hangul: 김예원
- RR: Gim Yewon
- MR: Kim Yewŏn

Stage name
- Hangul: 엄지
- RR: Eomji
- MR: Ŏmji

Kim Ye-won (Korean: 김예원; born August 19, 1998), better known by her stage name Umji (엄지), is a South Korean singer-songwriter and dancer. She is a member of the girl groups GFriend and Viviz.

== Early life ==
Umji was born on August 19, 1998, in Yeonsu-dong, Yeonsu-gu, Incheon, South Korea and is the youngest daughter of her family (one older brother and one older sister). Her father is dentist and chairman of a famous dental corporation in South Korea.

Umji went to English preschool and graduated from Shinsong Middle School, Incheon. She graduated from the School of Performing Arts Seoul (SOPA - Theater Department) in February 2017, along with her groupmate, SinB.

== Career ==
Umji made her debut as a member of the group GFriend on January 15, 2015, with the release of the extended play Season of Glass, along with the single "Glass Bead". The group first live performance took place on the KBS2's Music Bank on January 16.

In September 2016, she released her first solo soundtrack for the South Korean drama Shopping King Louie, entitled "The Way". In October 2016, the singer stopped activities with the group after being diagnosed with a twist in the sarus muscle. She returned a month after recovering for the Melon Music Awards.

In November 2017, she took part in King of Mask Singer, participating in two rounds until she was eliminated by Sunwoo Jung-a.

In 2018, along with member Sanha from the boys band Astro, the singer was chosen to host a talk show for the youth audience entitled Yogobara.

In March 2020, the singer released her second soundtrack for the South Korean drama Welcome called "Welcome". In April 2020, she replaced her fellow group member Eunha as a new DJ for Naver Now "Avenger Girls".

In October 2020, Umji appeared with Eunha on the show Knowing Bros and showcased a tip of the single "Mago" from GFriend's studio album 回:Walpurgis Night released two weeks later on November 9.

On October 6, 2021, it was announced that Umji, along with former GFriend members, Eunha and SinB, have signed a contract with BPM Entertainment to debut as a trio. On October 8, 2021, it was announced their new group name would be Viviz. Viviz debuted on February 9, 2022, with the extended play Beam of Prism.

== Discography ==
=== Soundtrack appearances ===
Title	Year	Peak chart position	Album
Title	Year	KOR Gaon	Album
"The Way"	2016	—	Shopping King Louie OST
"Meow the Secret boy" (어서와)	2020	—	Welcome OST
"May I Love You?" (이 마음을 전해도 될까)	2024	— (Note: ”May I Love You? (이 마음을 전해도 될까)” did not enter the Circle Digital Chart, but peaked at number 80 on the component Circle Download Chart.)	Lovely Runner OST
"—" denotes releases that did not chart or were not released in that region.

=== Composition credits ===
All song credits are adapted from the Korea Music Copyright Association's database unless stated otherwise.

Title	Year	Album	Artist	Composer	Lyricist	Arranger
"Hope"	2019	Fever Season	GFriend	No	Yes	No
"Eye of the Storm"	2020	回:Song of the Sirens	GFriend	Yes	Yes	No
"Tarot Cards"	2020	回:Song of the Sirens	GFriend	Yes	Yes	No
"Mago"	2020	回:Walpurgis Night	GFriend	Yes	Yes	No
"Better Me"	2020	回:Walpurgis Night	GFriend	Yes	Yes	No
"Eve Love"	2020	Non-album single	Umji	Yes	Yes	Yes
"Love You Like"	2022	Beam of Prism	Viviz	No	Yes	No
"Hypnotize"	2024	Voyage	Viviz	No	Yes	No
"Love & Tears"	2024	Voyage	Viviz	Yes	Yes	No
"Always"	2025	Season of Memories	Gfriend	Yes	Yes	No
"Love Language"	2025	A Montage of ( )	Viviz	No	Yes	No

== Filmography ==
=== Radio show ===
Year	Title	Network	Role	Notes	Ref.
2021–2022	Umji Cells	Spoon Radio Studio	DJ	November 16, 2021 – January 4, 2022	
