= Seoul Central District Court =

District court in Seoul, South Korea

- Interactive map of Seoul Central District Court
- 37.4937°N 127.0086°E
- Established: March 25, 1985
- Coordinates: 37.4937°N 127.0086°E
- Website: seoul.scourt.go.kr

The Seoul Central District Court (Korean: 서울중앙지방법원) is a district court with jurisdiction over Gangnam, Gwanak, Dongjak, Seocho, Jongno, and Jung in Seoul, South Korea.

== History ==
The court was established on March 25, 1895, when the Court Constitution Act was revised.
