= Eunha (singer) =

South Korean singer (born 1997)

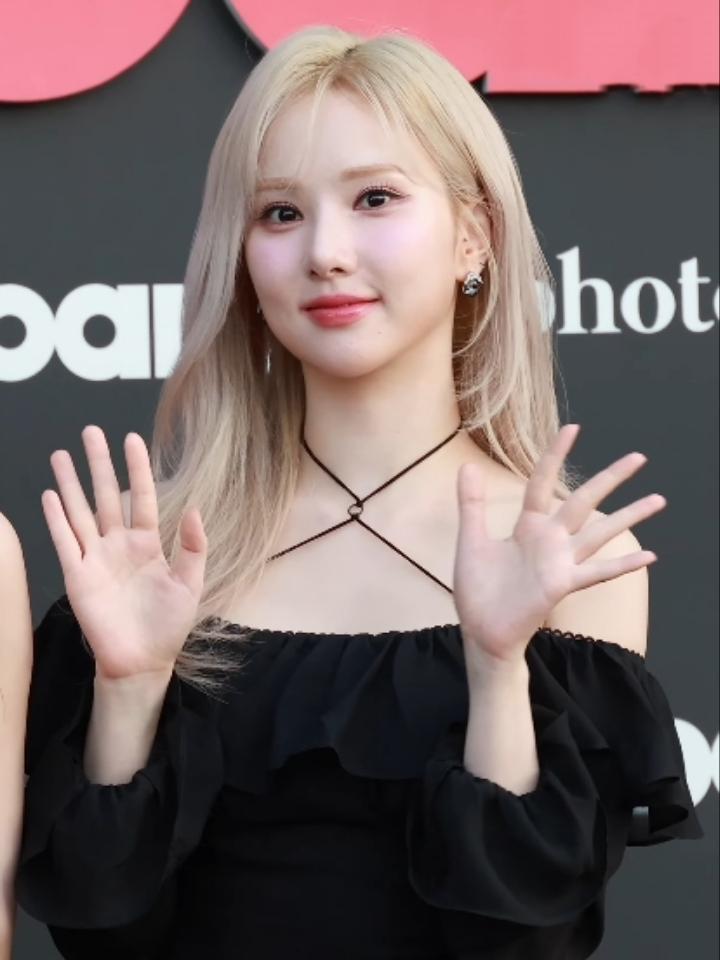
- Eunha in August 2024
- Born: Jung Eun-bi; May 30, 1997 (age 29); Seoul, South Korea
- Occupation: Singer
- Musical career
- Genre: K-pop
- Instrument: Vocals
- Years active: 2015–present
- Labels: Source; BPM; Uncore
- Member of: GFriend; Viviz

Korean name
- Hangul: 정은비
- RR: Jeong Eunbi
- MR: Chŏng Ŭnbi

Stage name
- Hangul: 은하
- RR: Eunha
- MR: Ŭnha

Jung Eun-bi (Korean: 정은비; born May 30, 1997), better known by her stage name Eunha (은하), is a South Korean singer. She is a vocalist in the girl groups GFriend and Viviz.

== Early life ==
Eunha was born May 30, 1997, in Geumcheon District, Seoul, South Korea. She appeared in the 2007 television drama The Clinic for Married Couples: Love and War. When she was seven years old, she was diagnosed with langerhans cell histiocytosis (LCH). She then took on treatment for the disease and had regular blood tests until she was in the sixth grade of primary school. It was successfully cured and it was said that there is no possibility of recurrence.

== Career ==
Eunha debuted as a member of South Korean girl group GFriend in early 2015 with the song "Glass Bead". She was featured on Pro C's single "Han River at Night", released on October 21, 2015. Eunha's first solo release was the song "Don't Come to Farewell", recorded for the soundtrack of the television drama Six Flying Dragons. It was released on March 7, 2016.

She played a role in MBC MBig TV's web show Oh My God! Tip with Block B's Park Kyung. Eunha was then featured on Park Kyung's single "Inferiority Complex", released May 25, 2016.

Her second solo release was the song "Love-ing", recorded for the soundtrack of the television drama Temperature of Love. It was released on October 2, 2017.

On October 6, 2021, it was announced that Eunha, along with former GFriend members SinB and Umji, had signed a contract with BPM Entertainment and would be debuting as a trio. On October 8, 2021, it was announced their new group name would be Viviz. Viviz debuted on February 9, 2022, with the extended play Beam of Prism.

On April 5, 2023, it was confirmed that Eunha and Xiumin would have a collaboration song "Who?", which was released on April 9, 2023. On May 23, 2023, Eunha was featured on Mighty Mouth's digital single "Slam Dunk".

== Discography ==
=== Singles ===
List of singles, showing year released, selected chart positions, sales figures, and name of the album
Title	Year	Peak chart positions	Sales	Album
Title	Year	KOR	Sales	Album
As lead artist
"Pat Pat" (어루만져 줄게요)	2024	—	—N/a	Non-album single
As featured artist
"Han River at Night" (밤에 본 한강) (Pro C featuring Eunha)	2015	—	—N/a	Non-album single
"Inferiority Complex" (자격지심) (Park Kyung featuring Eunha)	2016	3	KOR: 888,848	Notebook
"Chemistry" (케미) (MC Mong featuring Eunha)	2016	28	KOR: 40,317	U.F.O (Utter Force On)
"Make U Dance" (ADORA featuring Eunha)	2021	— (Note: "Make U Dance" did not enter the Gaon Digital Chart, but peaked at position 139 on component Download Chart.)	—N/a	Non-album single
"Slam Dunk" (Mighty Mouth featuring Eunha)	2023	—	—N/a	Non-album single
Collaborations
"Firefly" (with Hwang Chi Yeul)	2016	88	KOR: 33,107	Fall in, girl Vol. 1
"Taxi" (Sunny Girls: Eunha, YooA, Cheng Xiao, Nayoung and Nancy)	2016	—	—N/a	Inkigayo Music Crush Part. 2
"Hold Your Hand" (왼손 오른손) (with Chunji)	2017	— (Note: "Hold Your Hand" did not enter the Gaon Digital Chart, but peaked at position 96 on component BGM Chart.)	—N/a	Non-album single
"Blossom" (with Ravi)	2019	— (Note: "Blossom" did not enter the Gaon Digital Chart, but peaked at position 69 on component BGM Chart.)	—N/a	Non-album single
"Who?" (with Xiumin)	2023	—	—N/a	Non-album single
"—" denotes a recording that did not chart or was not released in that territory

=== Soundtrack appearances ===
List of soundtracks, showing year released, selected chart positions, sales figures, and name of the album
Title	Year	Peak chart positions	Sales	Album
Title	Year	KOR Gaon	Sales	Album
"Don't Come to Farewell" (이별로 오지마)	2016	98	KOR: 14,007	Six Flying Dragons OST Part 7
"Love-ing" (사랑 ing)	2017	82	KOR: 25,699	Temperature of Love OST Part 2
"You Look Nice Today" (오늘따라 예쁘다) (featuring Yoon Ddan Ddan)	2017	— (Note: "You Look Nice Today" didn't enter the Gaon Digital Chart, but peaked at position 77 on component BGM Chart.)	—N/a	The Package OST Part 5
"Hope" (희망)	2017	—	—N/a	Grand Chase for Kakao OST
"So In Love"	2018	—	—N/a	Lovely Horribly OST Part 4
"Tell me" (말해줘요)	2019	— (Note: "Tell Me" didn't enter the Gaon Digital Chart, but peaked at position 52 on component BGM Chart.)	—N/a	The Crowned Clown OST Part 3
"Mr. Stranger" (featuring Kisum)	2019	—	—N/a	My Absolute Boyfriend OST Part 3
"BUDDY! Birdie!"	2021	—	—N/a	Birdie Crush OST
"Pit-A-Pat" (설레)	2021	— (Note: "Pit-A-Pat" didn't enter the Gaon Digital Chart, but peaked at position 54 on component Download Chart.)	—N/a	She Would Never Know OST
"At The End Of Time" (시간의 끝에서)	2021	— (Note: "At The End Of Time" didn't enter the Gaon Digital Chart, but peaked at position 110 on component Download Chart.)	—N/a	The Stairway Of Time OST Part 1
"Telepathy" (텔레파시) (with Yang Yoseob)	2022	— (Note: "Telepathy" didn't enter the Gaon Digital Chart, but peaked at position 19 on component Download Chart.)	—N/a	Under The Oak Tree OST
"Do You Know That" (알고 있나요)	2022	— (Note: "Do You Know That" didn't enter the Gaon Digital Chart, but peaked at position 143 on component Download Chart.)	—N/a	The Forbidden Marriage OST
"—" denotes releases that did not chart or were not released in that territory.

=== Composition credits ===
All song credits are adapted from the Korea Music Copyright Association's database unless stated otherwise.

List of songs, showing year released, artist name, and name of the album
Title	Year	Artist	Album	Composer	Lyricist
"Hope"	2019	GFriend	Fever Season	No	Yes
"Apple"	2020	GFriend	回:Song of the Sirens	Yes	Yes
"Tarot Cards"	2020	GFriend	回:Song of the Sirens	Yes	Yes
"Mago"	2020	GFriend	回:Walpurgis Night	Yes	Yes
"Night Drive"	2020	GFriend	回:Walpurgis Night	Yes	Yes
"Milky Way"	2025	Viviz	A Montage of ( )	Yes	Yes

== Filmography ==
=== Television series ===
Year	Title	Role	Note	Ref.
2007	The Clinic for Married Couples: Love and War	Im Su-young	Credited as Jung Eun-bi	

=== Web show ===
Year	Title	Role	Ref.
2016	Oh My God! Tip	Herself	

=== Hosting ===
Year	Title	Notes	Ref.
2022	2022 INK Concert	with Lee Jang-jun	

== Awards and nominations ==
Name of the award ceremony, year presented, category, nominee of the award, and the result of the nomination
Award ceremony	Year	Category	Nominee / work	Result	Ref.
Golden Disc Awards	2017	Digital Bonsang	"Inferiority Complex" by Park Kyung & Eunha	Nominated	
Melon Music Awards	2016	Rap/Hip Hop Genre	"Inferiority Complex" by Park Kyung & Eunha	Nominated	
Mnet Asian Music Awards	2016	Best Collaboration	"Inferiority Complex" by Park Kyung & Eunha	Nominated	
Mnet Asian Music Awards	2016	Song of the Year	"Inferiority Complex" by Park Kyung & Eunha	Nominated	
