= SinB =

South Korean singer (born 1998)

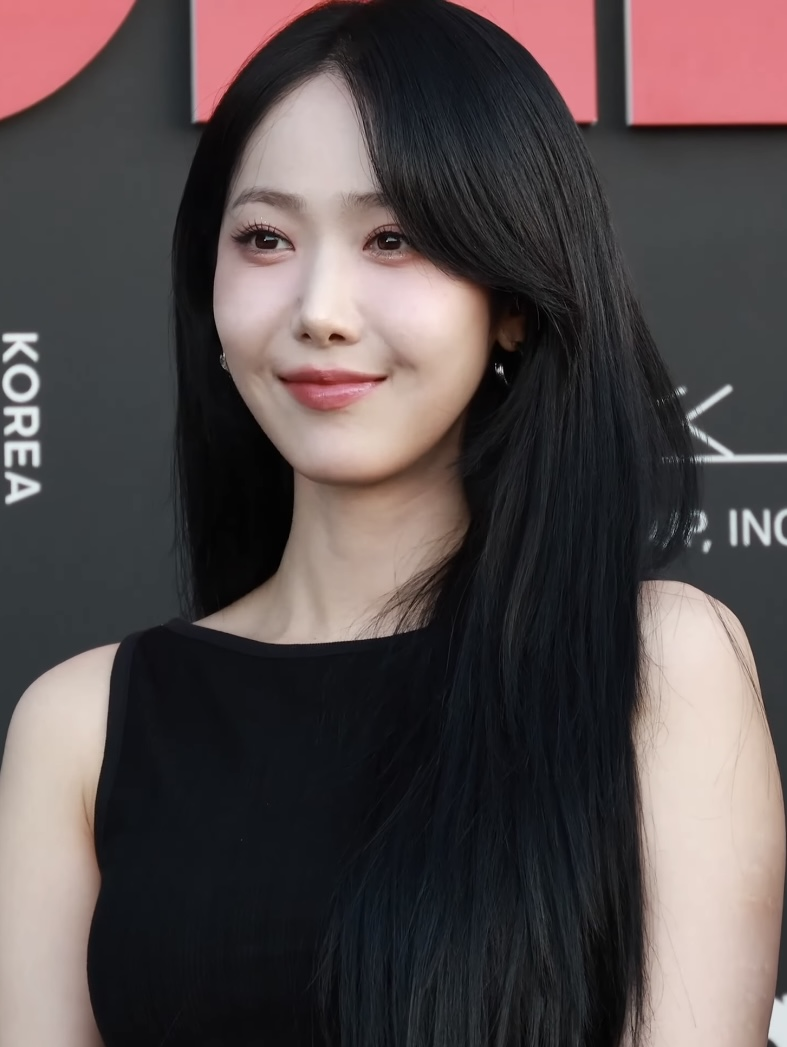
- SinB in August 2024
- Born: Hwang Eun-bi; June 3, 1998 (age 28); Cheongju, South Korea
- Occupations: Singer; dancer; actress
- Musical career
- Genre: K-pop
- Instrument: Vocals
- Years active: 2015–present
- Labels: Source; BPM; Uncore
- Member of: GFriend; Viviz

Korean name
- Hangul: 황은비
- RR: Hwang Eunbi
- MR: Hwang Ŭnbi

Stage name
- Hangul: 신비
- RR: Sinbi
- MR: Sinbi

Hwang Eun-bi (Korean: 황은비; born June 3, 1998), known professionally as SinB, is a South Korean singer, dancer, and actress. She is a member of South Korean girl groups GFriend and Viviz.

== Early life ==
SinB was born June 3, 1998, in Cheongju. In 2017, she graduated from School of Performing Arts Seoul.

Prior to her debut, she trained with Big Hit Entertainment for two years, then later moved onto LOEN Entertainment, where she trained for an additional year before settling with Source Music.

== Career ==
=== 2015–2021: Debut with GFriend ===
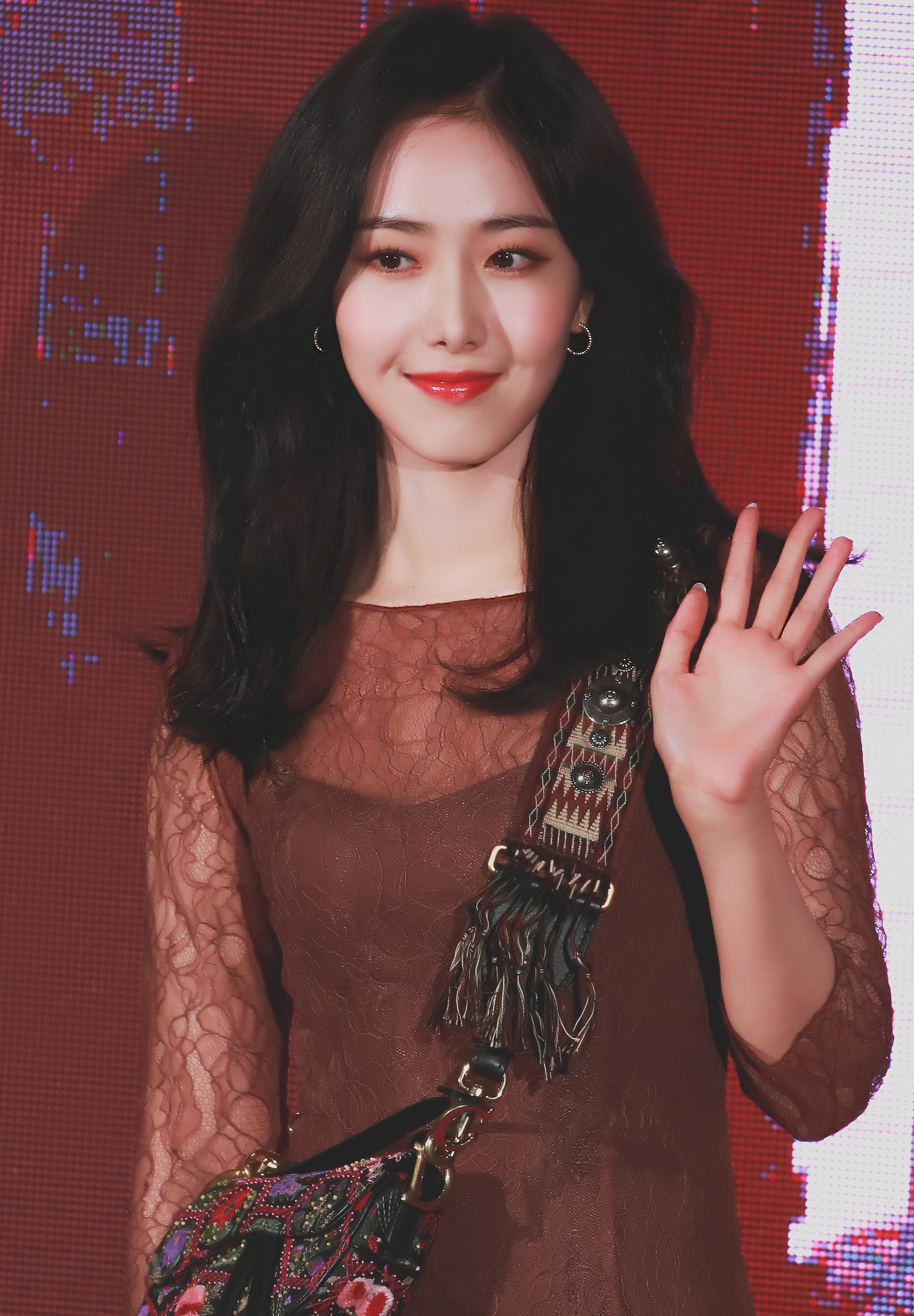
SinB in 2019

On January 15, 2015, SinB debuted as a member of South Korean girl group GFriend with the release of their debut album Season of Glass. On August 26, 2016, SinB released "Confession" (고백) for the soundtrack of Cinderella with Four Knights.

In 2018, SinB along with Red Velvet's Seulgi, (G)I-dle's Soyeon and soloist Chungha released "Wow Thing" on September 28 as part of SM Entertainment's project album SM Station X 0.

=== 2021–present: Debut with Viviz ===
On October 6, 2021, it was announced that SinB, along with former GFriend members, Eunha and Umji, had signed a contract with BPM Entertainment to debut as a trio. On October 8, 2021, it was announced the group name would be Viviz.

In December 2021, it was announced that SinB will appear as an MC on the new beauty and style program Style Me Season 2 which will air on Dong-A TV for the first time on January 9, 2022.

Viviz debuted on February 9, 2022, with the extended play Beam of Prism.

== Discography ==
=== Collaborations ===
List of collaboration, showing year released, selected chart positions, and name of the album
Title	Year	Peak chart position			Album
Title	Year	KOR Gaon	KOR Hot	US World	Album
"Wow Thing" (with Jeon So-yeon, Seulgi and Chungha)	2018	35	43	3	SM Station X 0
"Be Yourself" (신비송(ㅅㅂㅅ)) (with Shinbi)	2020	—	—	—	Shinbi Song: Self-esteem project
"—" denotes releases that did not chart or were not released in that region.

=== Soundtrack appearances ===
List of soundtrack, showing year released, selected chart positions, and name of the album
Title	Year	Peak chart position	Album
Title	Year	KOR Gaon	Album
"I'll Be There" (내품에 라바와 친구들)	2015	—	The Fairies In My Arms (내품에 친구들) OST
"Confession" (고백) (feat. Sijin)	2016	— (Note: "Confession" didn't enter Gaon Digital Chart, but peaked at position 76 on component BGM Chart.)	Cinderella with Four Knights OST Part 3
"Like A Dream" (꿈인 듯 해)	2020	— (Note: "Like A Dream" didn't enter Gaon Digital Chart, but peaked at position 81 on component BGM Chart.)	Do Do Sol Sol La La Sol OST Part 2
"Loveable" (사랑스러워)	2021	— (Note: "Loveable" didn't enter Gaon Digital Chart, but peaked at position 53 on component Download Chart.)	A Love So Beautiful OST Part 2
"—" denotes releases that did not chart.

=== Composition credits ===
All song credits are adapted from the Korea Music Copyright Association's database unless stated otherwise.

List of songs, showing year released, artist name, and name of the album
Title	Year	Artist	Album	Composer	Lyricist
"Hope"	2019	Fever Season	GFriend	No	Yes
"Secret Diary"	2020	回:Walpurgis Night	GFriend	Yes	Yes

== Filmography ==
=== Television show ===
Year	Title	Role	Notes	Ref.
2016	Weekly Idol	Fixed panelist	"Idols are the Best" corner (Episode 249–283)	
2022	Style Me	Host	Season 2	

=== Television series ===
Year	Title	Role	Ref.
2015–2016	The Fairies In My Arms	Shawing	

== Awards and nominations ==
Name of the award ceremony, year presented, category, nominee of the award, and the result of the nomination
Award	Year	Category	Nominee / Work	Result	Ref.
Seoul International Drama Awards	2021	Outstanding Korean Drama OST	"Like A Dream"	Nominated	
