= Source Music =

South Korean entertainment company

Source Music Co., Ltd.
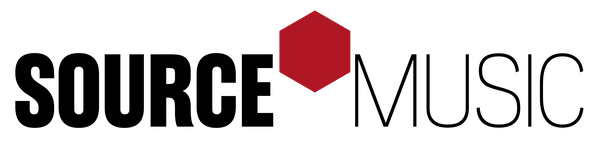
- Native name: 주식회사 쏘스뮤직
- Type: Private subsidiary
- Industry: Music; entertainment
- Founded: November 17, 2009; 16 years ago
- Founder: So Sung-jin
- Headquarters: 16F 42 Hangang-daero, Yongsan-gu, Seoul (Hangangno 3-ga, Yongsan Trade Center), South Korea
- Area served: Worldwide
- Key people: Shin Sun-jung (CEO and president)
- Services: Music production; Artists management
- Revenue: ▲ ₩77.9 billion (US$58.12 million) (2025)
- Net income: ▲ ₩10.72 billion (US$8 million) (2025)
- Total assets: ▲ ₩47.63 billion (US$35.54 million) (2025)
- Total equity: ▲ ₩22.65 billion (US$16.9 million) (2025)
- Number of employees: 64 (2025)
- Parent: Hybe Corporation (Note: since 2019)
- Website: www.sourcemusic.com

Source Music Co., Ltd. (Korean: 주식회사 쏘스뮤직) is a South Korean record label established in 2009 by So Sung-jin. In July 2019, the company was acquired by Hybe Corporation, making the company part of the collective term "Hybe Labels". (Note: Entertainment companies, music production companies or labels owned by Hybe Corporation partially or largely still operate independently.) The company manages girl group Le Sserafim, and previously managed soloist Kan Mi-youn and girl groups Glam and GFriend.

== History ==
=== 2009–2014: Foundation and first generation artists ===
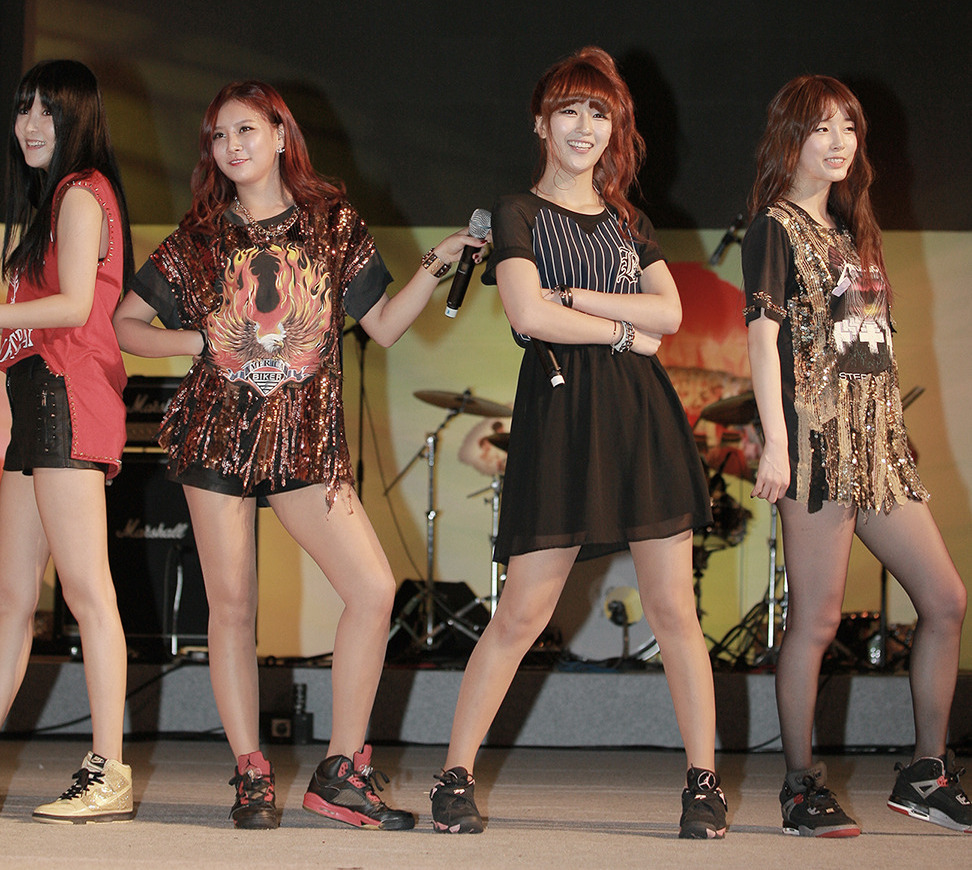
Glam in January 2014

Source Music was founded on November 17, 2009, by So Sung-jin, who worked at SM Entertainment as a talent manager for various artists between 2000 and 2002. He later moved to JYP Entertainment.

In 2010, the label's first-ever artist, female soloist Kan Mi-youn (formerly of Baby Vox) released her first digital single titled "Going Crazy". The music video featured Lee Joon and Mir from MBLAQ. The song peaked at #11 on South Korea's national chart Gaon.

In 2012, Glam was formed as a joint collaboration between Source Music and Big Hit Entertainment and was composed of Dahee, Trinity, Zinni, Miso and Jiyeon. Following Trinity's departure, they continued as a four-member group. The group was active until 2014 and was officially disbanded in January 2015, after Dahee was sentenced to one year imprisonment for a case of extortion against actor Lee Byung-hun.

=== 2015–2019 ===
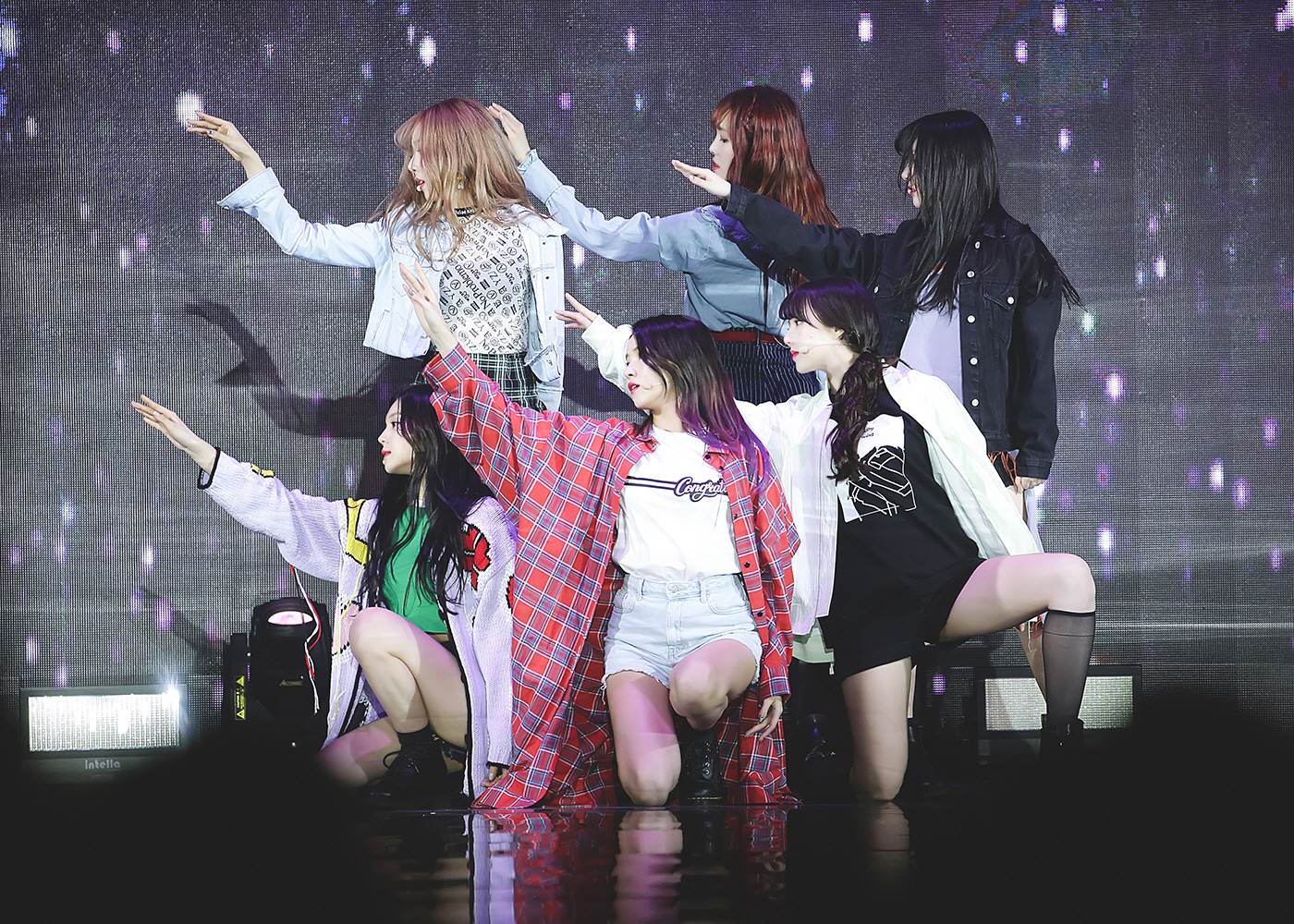
GFriend at the Asia Model Awards in May 2018

In 2015, GFriend was formed. The group consisted of members Sowon, Yerin, Eunha, Yuju, SinB, and Umji. They made their debut with the extended play Season of Glass on January 15, 2015.

=== 2019–present: Acquisition by Hybe Corporation ===
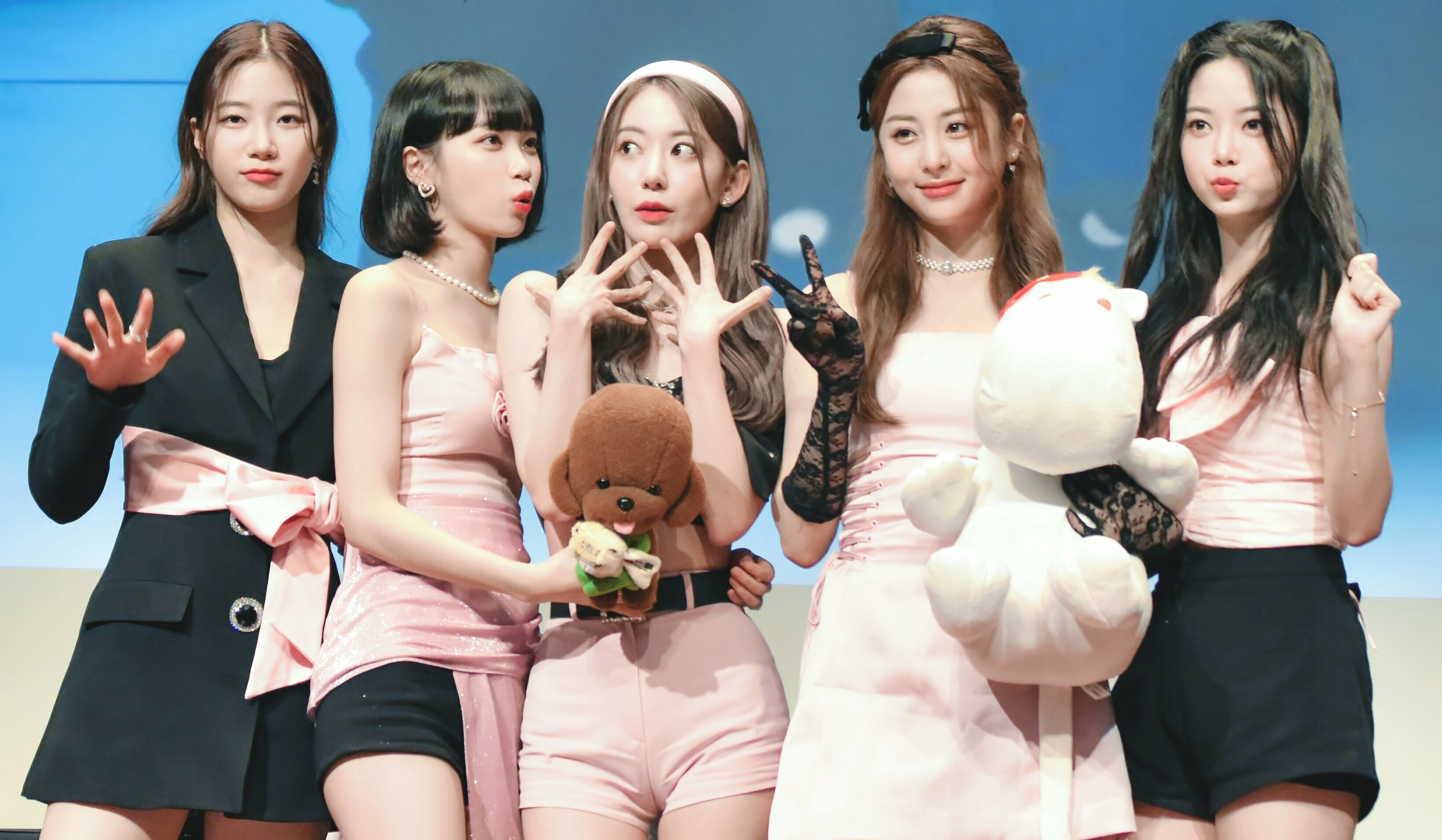
Le Sserafim in June 2022

In July 2019, Hybe Corporation (formerly Big Hit Entertainment) acquired Source Music, making the company a subsidiary under Hybe Labels, Hybe Corp.'s subdivision of labels, and keeping its existing management and style. On March 22, 2021, Source Music, as well as the other labels under Hybe Labels, moved to its new headquarters in the Yongsan Trade Center in the Yongsan District, the new headquarters of its parent company, Hybe Corporation. On March 31, 2021, the official website of Source Music changed its physical address to the new building in Yongsan, Seoul.

Following the completion of their six-year contract, all GFriend members left the company on May 22, 2021, marking the disbandment of the group. On March 14, 2022, former Iz*One members Sakura Miyawaki and Kim Chaewon signed exclusive contracts with Source Music and confirmed their debut in a new group. Le Sserafim, consisting of Sakura, Kim Chaewon, Huh Yunjin, Kazuha Nakamura, Kim Garam and Hong Eunchae, debuted on May 2 with the extended play Fearless.

In April 2022, Personal Information Protection Commission (PIPC) sanctioned six businesses for violations of the country's personal information protection regulations. The PIPC imposed a combined ₩45 million (US$33,575.17) in administrative fines and issued corrective orders. The violations were classified by the commission as minor, and no administrative surcharges were imposed. Source Music used Google's questionnaire to reimburse membership fees related to the disbandment of GFriend, and the personal information of 22 survey participants was compromised due to improper disclosure of survey results.

On September 24, 2024, Source Music announced that the members of GFriend would reunite in 2025 for a tenth anniversary project.

== Artists ==
- Le Sserafim
  - Huh Yunjin

== Former artists ==
- 8Eight (2009–2014, co-managed by Big Hit Entertainment)
- Kan Mi-youn (2009–2014)
- Glam (2012–2015, co-managed by Big Hit Entertainment)
- Eden Beatz (2012–2015)
- MI.O (2014–2018)
- GFriend (2015–2021; 2024–2025)
- Le Sserafim
  - Kim Garam (2022)

== Legal matters ==
=== Lawsuit against former trainee ===
In 2016, Source Music won a lawsuit against a former trainee who had been due to debut in GFriend. The trainee, referred to as "A" in reports, joined the agency in October 2013 and was initially part of the group's planned seven-member lineup. However, she stopped attending training in April 2014 after expressing her wish to return home. Later on, she claimed that the agency had pressured her to lose weight within a short period and excluded her from training when she failed to meet its expectations. The label filed a lawsuit in August 2014, seeking approximately ₩55.7 million (US$41,558.6) in compensation for the trainee's departure, including training expenses and costs it claimed were caused by a five-month delay to the group's debut.

On 2 May 2016, the Seoul Central District Court upheld a ruling ordering the former trainee to pay the label approximately ₩12.47 million (US$9,304.05), twice the amount the agency had invested in her training, in accordance with their contract. However, the court dismissed the agency's request for a further ₩43.22 million (US$32,247.09), finding that the delay could not be blamed solely on her departure for the group not debuting as planned, as another trainee had also left the planned lineup.

=== Lawsuit against Min Hee-jin ===
On July 15, 2024, Source Music filed a ₩500 million (US$373,057.49) lawsuit against Min Hee-jin, alleging interference with its business operations, financial losses and breaches of contractual obligations. The dispute arose from Min's public statements about the formation of NewJeans, particularly her claims that she had selected the group's members while they were trainees at Source Music and that the company had neglected them. Source Music disputed these claims, arguing that they misrepresented the group's development and damaged its reputation and that of its affiliated artists, including Le Sserafim.

On August 22, 2025, the Seoul Central District Court admitted KakaoTalk messages belonging to Min as evidence. Her lawyers had challenged their admissibility, arguing that they had been obtained unlawfully. The court reportedly ruled that accessing the device using a known password did not violate communications privacy laws. It also rejected Source Music's request to submit a multimedia presentation, finding that oral arguments were sufficient. The next hearing was scheduled for November 7, 2025.

At the fourth hearing, on November 7, 2025, Source Music presented video recordings concerning the recruitment of NewJeans members and their trainee contracts. One recording showed a discussion in which a member's mother considered whether her daughter should remain with Source Music or transfer to another agency if the group's debut was not confirmed. The company submitted the footage to challenge Min's account of the group's formation and its treatment of the members.

The fifth hearing took place on December 19, 2025. Source Music reiterated that Min's statements had damaged its reputation and affected its affiliated artists. Min's representatives maintained that her remarks should be understood in the context of the wider dispute with HYBE and the circumstances surrounding NewJeans' formation. The court initially concluded oral arguments and scheduled a judgment for January 2026. However, Source Music subsequently applied to reopen proceedings to introduce additional evidence and witnesses, delaying the anticipated ruling.

The court resumed hearings during the first half of 2026, with both parties submitting further arguments. Source Music maintained that Min's statements were defamatory and had damaged its reputation and that of its affiliated artists. Min's legal team argued that her remarks were made in response to HYBE's audit of ADOR and its handling of the dispute in the media. They maintained that her comments concerned the circumstances surrounding NewJeans' formation rather than constituting unlawful attacks on Source Music or its artists.

On August 21, 2026, the court concluded oral arguments for a second time but did not immediately set a judgment date, indicating that it would await developments in related proceedings. Source Music subsequently sought to reopen arguments and introduce further evidence. Both parties submitted written arguments on whether proceedings should resume, with Min's representatives opposing further delays. The applications left the case unresolved despite the conclusion of oral arguments.

On November 13, 2026, the court dismissed Source Music's damages claim against Min and ordered the company to pay the litigation costs. The ruling was delivered alongside decisions in separate damages proceedings involving Min and Belift Lab. Source Music expressed disappointment, arguing that the court had not adequately considered the impact of Min's remarks on its artists or evidence that it believed demonstrated her malicious intent. The company maintained that the statements had damaged the label and caused psychological distress to artists who were not directly involved in the dispute. It announced that it would appeal the ruling, describing the judgment as unjust and stating that it would continue to defend its position and protect its artists.
