= GFriend discography =

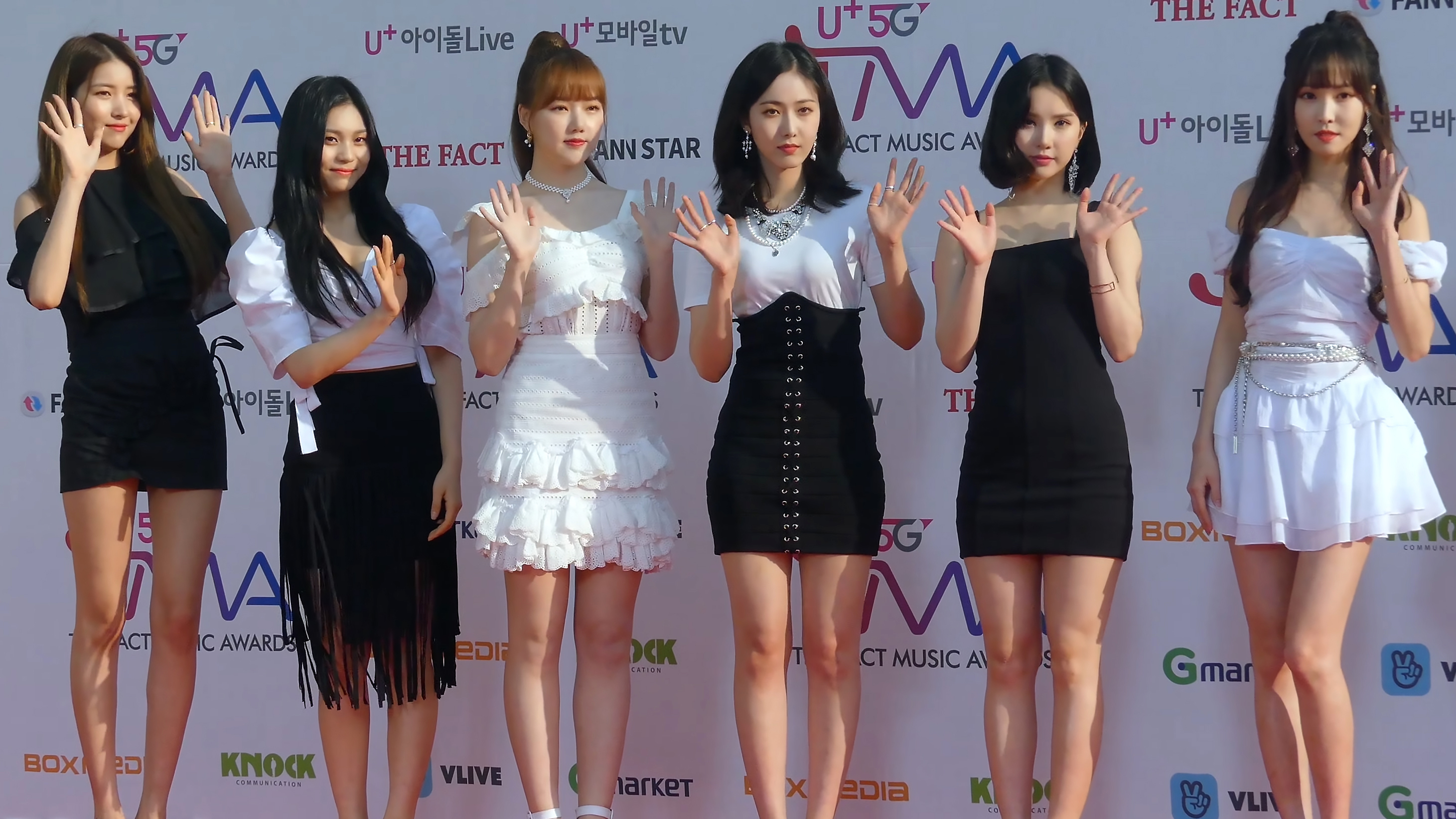
- GFriend in April 2019
- Studio albums: 4
- EPs: 10
- Compilation albums: 1
- Singles: 19
- Music videos: 20
- Reissues: 1
- Single albums: 1

The discography of the South Korean girl group GFriend consists of four studio albums, one compilation album, ten extended plays, one reissue album, one single album and nineteen singles. The group is composed of six members: Sowon, Yerin, Eunha, Yuju, SinB and Umji, and was formed by Source Music in 2015.

== Albums ==
=== Studio albums ===
List of studio albums, with selected details, selected chart positions, and sales figures
Title	Details	Peak chart positions				Sales
Title	Details	KOR	JPN	JPN Hot.	US World	Sales
LOL	Released: July 11, 2016; Label: Source Music; Formats: CD, digital download, SMC	3	55	—	7	KOR: 79,902; JPN: 3,088
Time for Us	Released: January 14, 2019; Label: Source Music; Formats: CD, digital download	2	55	—	12	KOR: 96,024; JPN: 2,019
Fallin' Light	Released: November 13, 2019; Label: King Records; Formats: CD, digital download	—	7	11	—	KOR: 347; JPN: 6,753
回:Walpurgis Night	Released: November 9, 2020; Label: Source Music; Formats: CD, digital download	3	84	—	—	KOR: 74,913; JPN: 1,042
"—" denotes releases that did not chart or were not released in that region.

=== Compilation albums ===
List of compilation albums, with selected details, selected chart positions, and sales figures
Title	Details	Peak chart positions		Sales
Title	Details	JPN	JPN Hot	Sales
Kyō Kara Watashitachi wa: GFriend 1st Best	Released: May 23, 2018; Label: King Records; Formats: CD, digital download	10	10	JPN: 14,736

=== Reissues ===
List of reissues, with selected details, selected chart positions, and sales figures
Title	Details	Peak chart positions		Sales
Title	Details	KOR	JPN	Sales
Rainbow	Released: September 13, 2017; Label: Source Music; Formats: CD, digital download	2	120	KOR: 43,807; JPN: 1,973 (Note: The sales of Parallel and Rainbow are combined in Oricon.)

== Extended plays ==
List of extended plays, with selected details, selected chart positions, and sales figures
Title	Details	Peak chart positions			Sales
Title	Details	KOR	JPN	US World	Sales
Season of Glass	Released: January 15, 2015; Label: Source Music; Formats: CD, digital download, SMC	9	—	—	KOR: 24,952
Flower Bud	Released: July 23, 2015; Label: Source Music; Formats: CD, digital download	6	—	—	KOR: 31,198
Snowflake	Released: January 25, 2016; Label: Source Music; Formats: CD, digital download, SMC	2	195	10	KOR: 44,985; JPN: 2,211
The Awakening	Released: March 6, 2017; Label: Source Music; Formats: CD, digital download	1	89	5	KOR: 75,867
Parallel	Released: August 1, 2017; Label: Source Music; Formats: CD, digital download, SMC	3	105	10	KOR: 62,781; JPN: 1,973
Time for the Moon Night	Released: April 30, 2018; Label: Source Music; Formats: CD, digital download, SMC	1	63	6	KOR: 89,412; JPN: 1,170
Sunny Summer	Released: July 19, 2018; Label: Source Music; Formats: CD, digital download, SMC	2	112	13	KOR: 58,333; JPN: 1,159
Fever Season	Released: July 1, 2019; Label: Source Music; Formats: CD, digital download	1	73	10	KOR: 82,389; JPN: 979
回:Labyrinth	Released: February 3, 2020; Label: Source Music; Formats: CD, digital download	1	43	—	KOR: 82,760; JPN: 1,414
回:Song of the Sirens	Released: July 13, 2020; Label: Source Music; Formats: CD, digital download	3	42	—	KOR: 91,115; JPN: 1,240
"—" denotes releases that did not chart or were not released in that region.

== Single albums ==
List of single albums, with selected details, selected chart positions, and sales figures
Title	Details	Peak chart positions		Sales
Title	Details	KOR	JPN	Sales
Season of Memories	Released: January 13, 2025; Label: Source Music; Formats: CD, digital download	3	30	KOR: 91,750; JPN: 939

== Singles ==
List of singles, with year released, selected chart positions, sales figures, and name of the album
Title	Year	Peak chart positions							Sales (DL)	Album
Title	Year	KOR	KOR Hot	JPN	JPN Hot	MYS	SGP	US World	Sales (DL)	Album
"Glass Bead" (유리구슬)	2015	25	—N/a	—	—	—	—	—	KOR: 1,025,731	Season of Glass
"Me Gustas Tu" (오늘부터 우리는) (Note: "Me Gustas Tu (Japanese version)" was released on May 6, 2018, as the title track from the group's Japanese debut album, GFriend 1st Best.)	2015	8	—N/a	—	—	—	—	—	KOR: 2,500,000	Flower Bud and GFriend 1st Best
"Rough" (시간을 달려서)	2016	1	—N/a	—	—	—	—	—	KOR: 2,500,000	Snowflake
"Navillera" (너 그리고 나)	2016	1	—N/a	—	—	—	—	12	KOR: 1,195,154	LOL
"Fingertip"	2017	2	56	—	—	—	—	13	KOR: 576,801	The Awakening
"Love Whisper" (귀를 기울이면)	2017	2	13	—	—	—	—	—	KOR: 557,278	Parallel
"Summer Rain" (여름비)	2017	11	21	—	—	—	—	—	KOR: 195,196	Rainbow
"Time for the Moon Night" (밤)	2018	2	3	—	—	—	—	17	—N/a	Time for the Moon Night
"Sunny Summer" (여름여름해)	2018	11	10	—	—	—	—	—	—N/a	Sunny Summer
"Memoria"	2018	—	—	6	13	—	—	—	JPN: 17,593 (Phy.)	Fallin' Light
"Sunrise" (해야) (Note: "Sunrise (Japanese version)" was released on February 13, 2019, as GFriend's second Japanese single.)	2019	12	10	11	50	—	—	25	JPN: 13,491 (Phy.)	Time for Us and Fallin' Light
"Flower"	2019	—	—	9	35	—	—	—	JPN: 11,053 (Phy.)	Fallin' Light
"Fever" (열대야)	2019	27	13	—	—	—	—	—	—N/a	Fever Season
"Fallin' Light" (天使の梯子)	2019	—	—	—	—	—	—	—	—N/a	Fallin' Light
"Crossroads" (교차로)	2020	32	20	—	—	—	—	—	—N/a	回:Labyrinth
"Apple"	2020	54	41	—	—	—	—	—	—N/a	回:Song of the Sirens
"Mago"	2020	42	35	—	—	18	18	16	—N/a	回:Walpurgis Night
"Season of Memories" (우리의 다정한 계절 속에)	2025	68	—	—	—	—	—	—	—N/a	Season of Memories
"—" denotes releases that did not chart or were not released in that region.

== Soundtrack appearances ==
List of soundtrack appearances, with year released, selected chart positions, and name of the album
Title	Year	Peak chart positions	Album
Title	Year	KOR Down.	Album
"Letter in My Pocket"	2016	—	Pokémon the Movie XY&Z OST
"Wanna Be"	2018	64	What's Wrong with Secretary Kim OST
"ZZAN" (짠)	2019	131	Just One Bite Season 2 OST
"Cocktail Love" (칵테일 사랑)	2020	—	Two Yoo Project Sugar Man 3: Episode 10
"—" denotes releases that did not chart or were not released in that region.

== Collaborations ==
List of collaborations, with year released, selected chart positions, sales figures, and name of the album
Title	Year	Peak chart positions	Sales (DL)	Album
Title	Year	JPN	Sales (DL)	Album
"Oh Difficult~" (with Sonar Pocket)	2019	13	JPN: 3,908 (Phy.)	Non-album single

== Other charted songs ==
List of other charted songs, with year released, selected chart positions, sales figures, and name of the album
Title	Year	Peak chart positions		Sales (DL)	Album
Title	Year	KOR	KOR Hot	Sales (DL)	Album
"Luv Star" (사랑별)	2016	52	—N/a	KOR: 72,598	Snowflake
"Trust"	2016	53	—N/a	KOR: 51,466	Snowflake
"Say My Name" (내 이름을 불러줘)	2016	72	—N/a	KOR: 51,728	Snowflake
"Someday" (그런 날엔)	2016	75	—N/a	KOR: 40,563	Snowflake
"Fall in Love" (물들어요)	2016	55	—N/a	KOR: 55,037	LOL
"LOL"	2016	80	—N/a	KOR: 43,237	LOL
"Mermaid"	2016	83	—N/a	KOR: 40,432	LOL
"Gone with the Wind" (바람에 날려)	2016	87	—N/a	KOR: 42,950	LOL
"Hear The Wind Sing" (바람의 노래)	2017	34	—N/a	KOR: 41,809	The Awakening
"Rain In The Spring Time" (봄비)	2017	94	—N/a	KOR: 21,003	The Awakening
"Please Save My Earth" (나의 지구를 지켜줘)	2017	99	—N/a	KOR: 20,156	The Awakening
"One Half" (이분의 일 1/2)	2017	52	—	KOR: 36,196	Parallel
"Ave Maria" (두 손을 모아)	2017	72	—	KOR: 31,212	Parallel
"Rainbow"	2017	86	—	KOR: 21,688	Rainbow
"Labyrinth"	2020	— (Note: "Labyrinth" did not enter Gaon Digital Chart, but peaked at number 42 on Gaon Download Chart.)	99	—N/a	回:Labyrinth
"Eclipse" (지금 만나러 갑니다)	2020	— (Note: "Eclipse" did not enter Gaon Digital Chart, but peaked at number 47 on Gaon Download Chart.)	86	—N/a	回:Labyrinth
"Eye of the Storm" (눈의 시간)	2020	— (Note: "Eye of the Storm" did not enter Gaon Digital Chart, but peaked at number 51 on Gaon Download Chart.)	92	—N/a	回:Song of the Sirens
"—" denotes releases that did not chart or were not released in that region.

== Music videos ==
List of music videos, with year released and name of the director(s)
Title	Year	Director(s)	Ref.
"Glass Bead" (유리구슬)	2015	Hong Won-ki (Zanybros)	
"Me Gustas Tu" (오늘부터 우리는)	2015	Hong Won-ki (Zanybros)	—N/a
"Rough" (시간을 달려서)	2016	Hong Won-ki (Zanybros)	
"Wave" (파도)	2016	Hong Won-ki (Zanybros)	
"Navillera" (너 그리고 나)	2016	Oui Kim (GDW)	
"Fingertip"	2017	Hong Won-ki (Zanybros)	
"Love Whisper" (귀를 기울이면)	2017	Hong Won-ki (Zanybros)	
"Summer Rain"(여름비)	2017	Hong Won-ki (Zanybros)	
"Time for the Moon Night" (밤)	2018	Edie Ko	
"Me Gustas Tu" (今日から私たちは) (Japanese version)	2018	Hong Won-ki (Zanybros)	—N/a
"Sunny Summer" (여름여름해)	2018	Edie Ko	
"Memoria"	2018	Hong Won-ki (Zanybros)	
"Sunrise" (해야)	2019	Vikings League	
"Sunrise" (Japanese version)	2019	Vikings League	
"Flower"	2019	Hong Won-ki (Zanybros)	—N/a
"Fever" (열대야)	2019	Hong Won-ki (Zanybros)	
"Fallin' Light" (天使の梯子)	2019	Zanybros	
"Crossroads" (교차로)	2020	Edie Ko	
"Apple"	2020	Guzza (Lumpens)	
"Mago"	2020	Guzza (Lumpens)	
"Season of Memories" (우리의 다정한 계절 속에)	2025	Guzza (Kudo)	
