= List of songs recorded by GFriend =

This is a list of all the songs by South Korean girl group GFriend. The group has released 93 songs in total since debut in 2015 until November 2020 with 4 studio albums, 1 compilation album, one reissue and 10 extended plays.

Key
†	Indicates single release
‡	Song available in Korean and Japanese

== A ==
Song	Writer	Album	Year	Ref.
"Ave Maria" (두 손을 모아)	Megatone; Ferdy	Parallel	2017	
"A Starry Sky"	Son Go-eun	Time for Us	2019	
"Apple" † ‡	FRANTS; Pdogg "hitman" bang Hwang Hyun (MonoTree); Eunha; Hannah Robinson; Richard Phillips; Alex Nese; Chendy; Yuju; Noh Joo-hwan; Kim Jin (Makeumine Works); Gu Yeo-reum (Makeumine Works); Lee Seu-ran	回:Song of the Sirens	2020	

== B ==
Song	Writer	Album	Year	Ref.
"Bye"	Noh Joo-hwan; Kim Ye-il; Sophia Pae	Time for the Moon Night	2018	
"Beautiful"	Kanata Okajima; Carlos K. Taku Goto	Fallin' Light	2019	
"Better Me" (performed by Sowon and Umji)	SCORE (13); MEGATONE (13); LUKE (13); Umji; Sowon	回:Walpurgis Night	2020	

== C ==
Song	Writer	Album	Year	Ref.
"Compass" (나침반)	Kim Jung-yoon (ZigZag Note); Oh Ji-hoon; Choi Hyun-joon	LOL	2016	
"Click" (찰칵)	Mafly; Hyuk Shin; MRey; DK; Shin	LOL	2016	
"Contrail" (비행운 : 飛行雲)	Mafly; Keyfly; Brian Choi; 220; Erik	The Awakening	2017	
"Crush" (핑)	e.one	The Awakening	2017	
"Crossroads" (교차로) † ‡	Noh Joo-hwan; Lee Won-jong	回:Labyrinth	2020	
"Crème Brûlée"	Lee Woo-min "collapsedone" Justin Reinstein; Mayu Wakisaka; Lee Seu-ran	回:Song of the Sirens	2020	

== D ==
Song	Writer	Album	Year	Ref.
"Distance" (한 뼘)	Iggy; Youngbae	LOL	2016	
"Dreamcatcher"	Kim Yeon-seo; Dvwn minGtion	回:Labyrinth	2020	

== E ==
Song	Writer	Album	Year	Ref.
"Emotional Days"	Carlos K.	Fallin' Light	2019	
"Eclipse" (지금 만나러 갑니다)	SCORE (13); MEGATONE (13); DOOR (13)	回:Labyrinth	2020	
"Eye of the Storm" (눈의 시간)	Alyssa Ayaka Ichinose; Mike Macdermid; Charlotte Churchman; David Brant "hitman" bang Umji; Lee Mi-seong (VoidheaD); Lee Seu-ran; Yuju; Kim Jin (Makeumine Works)	回:Song of the Sirens	2020	

== F ==
Song	Writer	Album	Year	Ref.
"Fall in Love" (물들어요)	Hong Beom-gyu; Jo In-ho; Kim Woong	LOL	2016	
"Fingertip" †	Iggy; Youngbae	The Awakening	2017	
"Falling Asleep Again" (그루잠)	Mafly; Noh Joo-hwan; Lee Won-jong	Parallel	2017	
"Flower Garden" (휘리휘리)	MI.O	Time for the Moon Night	2018	
"Flower" † ‡	13	Fever Season; Fallin' Light	2019	
"Fever" (열대야) †	Igi (Oreo); Cino (Oreo); Ung Kim (Oreo)	Fever Season	2019	
"Fallin' Light" (天使の梯子) †	Iggy; SYB; Carlos K.	Fallin' Light	2019	
"From Me"	Noh Joo-hwan; Lee Won-jong; Jeina Choi "hitman" bang	回:Labyrinth	2020	

== G ==
Song	Writer	Album	Year	Ref.
"Glass Bead" (유리구슬) † ‡	Iggy; Youngbae	Season of Glass	2015	
"Gone with the Wind" (바람에 날려)	e.one	LOL	2016	
"Glow" (만화경)	Lee Mi-so; Daniel Sherman; Val De Prete; Caroline Gustavsson	Time for Us	2019	
"GRWM"	Son Young-jin (MosPick); Yeahnice (MosPick); Ferdy (MosPick); JayJay (MosPick)	回:Walpurgis Night	2020	

== H ==
Song	Writer	Album	Year	Ref.
"Hear the Wind Sing" (바람의 노래)	Megatone; Ferdy	The Awakening	2017	
"Hope" (기대)	GFriend; Lee Won-jong	Fever Season	2019	
"Here We Are"	Jeong Ho-hyeon (e.one)	回:Labyrinth	2020	

== I ==
Song	Writer	Album	Year	Ref.
"It's You" (겨울, 끝)	Miyao; Jade; Kim Ah-reum; Spacecowboy	Time for Us	2019	

== K ==
Song	Writer	Album	Year	Ref.
"Koi no Hajimari" (恋の始まり)	Noh Joo-hwan; Lee Won-jong; Kim Jung-woo	Fallin' Light	2019	

== L ==
Song	Writer	Album	Year	Ref.
"Luv Star" (사랑별)	e.one Jo Jae-seok	Snowflake	2016	
"LOL"	Kim Eana; Master Key; Phat Music; Score	LOL	2016	
"Love Whisper" (귀를 기울이면) † ‡	Iggy; Youngbae	Parallel	2017	
"Life is a Party"	Mafly; Ponde; Hyuk Shin; RE:ONE; Davey Nate	Parallel	2017	
"Love Bug"	Seo Ji-eum; David Amber; Andy Love; Ryan S. Jhun	Time for the Moon Night	2018	
"Love in the Air"	Andreas Öberg; Darren Smith; Sean Alexander; Noh Joo-hwan; Avenue 52	Sunny Summer	2018	
"L.U.V." (기적을 넘어)	Lee Seu-ran; Darren Smith; Sean Alexander; Avenue 52	Time for Us	2019	
"Love Oh Love"	Jerry; Emotional Vending Machine; Megatone stereo14	Time for Us	2019	
"La Pam Pam"	Jang Jung-woo (MI.O)	Fallin' Light	2019	
"Labyrinth" ‡	"hitman" bang Cho Yoon-kyung; Noh Joo-hwan; ADORA; Sophia Pae; Kim Jung-woo; FRANTS; Carlos K. Kim Yeon-seo	回:Labyrinth	2020	
"Love Spell"	FRANTS; Maria Marcus "hitman" bang Misung (VoidheaD); ZNEE (Flying Lab)	回:Walpurgis Night	2020	

== M ==
Song	Writer	Album	Year	Ref.
"Me Gustas Tu" (오늘부터 우리는) † ‡	Iggy; Youngbae	Flower Bud	2015	
"My Buddy" (기억해) ‡	Iggy; Youngbae	Flower Bud	2015	
"Mermaid"	MI.O	LOL	2016	
"Memoria" † ‡	Noh Joo-hwan; Carlos K. Joe; Ryo Miyata	Time for Us; Fallin' Light	2018	
"Mr. Blue"	13	Fever Season	2019	
"My My My"	Jang Jung-woo (MI.O)	Fallin' Light	2019	
"Mago" †	FRANTS "hitman" bang Kyler Niko; Paulina Cerrilla; Eunha; Cho Yoon-kyung; Yuju; Alice Vicious; Cazzi Opeia; Ellen Berg; JADED JANE; Noisy Citizen; Justin Reinstein; JJean; Umji	回:Walpurgis Night	2020	

== N ==
Song	Writer	Album	Year	Ref.
"Neverland"	Eden Beatz; ZigZag Note; Kang Myeong-shin	Season of Glass	2015	
"Navillera" (너 그리고 나) † ‡	Iggy; Youngbae	LOL	2016	
"Night Drive" (performed by Eunha and Yuju)	Noh Joo-hwan; Yuju; Eunha	回:Walpurgis Night	2020	

== O ==
Song	Writer	Album	Year	Ref.
"One"	Iggy; Youngbae	Flower Bud	2015	
"One Half" (이분의 일 1/2)	Iggy; Youngbae	Parallel	2017	
"Our Secret" (비밀 이야기)	Lee Seu-ran; B.Eyes	Time for Us	2019	
"Only 1"	Iggy; Youngbae; Minki	Time for Us	2019	
"Oh Difficult" (with Sonar Pocket) †	—	Oh Difficult (with GFriend)	2019	

== P ==
Song	Writer	Album	Year	Ref.
"Please Save My Earth" (나의 지구를 지켜줘)	MI.O	The Awakening	2017	
"Paradise"	Islan; Jeong Ho-hyun (e.one)	Fever Season	2019	

== R ==
Song	Writer	Album	Year	Ref.
"Rough" (시간을 달려서) † ‡	Iggy; Youngbae	Snowflake	2016	
"Rain in the Spring Time" (봄비)	Mafly; Keyfly; Erik Lidbom; Sophia Pae; 220	The Awakening	2017	
"Red Umbrella" (빨간 우산)	Heuktae; Jang Jung-seok	Parallel	2017	
"Rainbow"	Mafly; Fuxxy; Vincenzo; Any Masingga; Anna Timgren	Rainbow	2017	
"Room of Mirrors" (거울의 방)	Noh Joo-hwan; Lee Won-jong; D.Ori; Steven Lee; Caroline Gustavsson; Kim Kiwi	回:Song of the Sirens	2020	

== S ==
Song	Writer	Album	Year	Ref.
"Say My Name" (내 이름을 불러줘)	Iggy; Youngbae	Snowflake	2016	
"Someday" (그런 날엔)	Heuk Tae; Jun Ta; Park Chan	Snowflake	2016	
"Sunshine" (나의 일기장)	e.one	LOL	2016	
"Summer Rain" (여름비) †	Iggy; Youngbae	Rainbow	2017	
"Sunny Summer" (여름여름해) †	Duble Sidekick; Black Edition	Sunny Summer	2018	
"Sweety"	MI.O	Sunny Summer	2018	
"Sunrise (해야)" † ‡	Noh Joo-hwan; Lee Won-jong	Time for Us	2019	
"Show Up" (보호색)	Noh Joo-hwan; Lee Won-jong	Time for Us	2019	
"Smile" (좋은 말 한때)	Noh Joo-hwan; Lee Won-jong	Fever Season	2019	
"Stairs in the North" (북쪽 계단)	"hitman" bang FRANTS	回:Song of the Sirens	2020	
"Secret Diary" (performed by Yerin and SinB)	Noh Joo-hwan; Woong Kim; Andreas Öberg; Simon Petrén; Yerin; SinB	回:Walpurgis Night	2020	

== T ==
Song	Writer	Album	Year	Ref.
"Trust" ‡	Noh Joo-hwan; Lee Won-jong	Snowflake	2016	
"Time for the Moon Night" (밤) † ‡	Noh Joo-hwan; Lee Won-jong	Time for the Moon Night	2018	
"Tik Tik" (틱틱)	Iggy; Youngbae	Time for the Moon Night	2018	
"Truly Love"	Limgo; Kim Woong	Time for Us	2019	
"Tarot Cards" ‡	Jung Ho-hyun (e.one); Kim Yeon-seo; Sophia Pae; Val Del Prete; Son Ko-eun (MonoTree); Cho Yoon-kyung; Yuju; Eunha; Umji	回:Song of the Sirens	2020	
"Three of Cups"	Noh Joo-hwan; Lee Won-jong; Kim Jung-woo; Mayu Wakisaka	回:Walpurgis Night	2020	

== U ==
Song	Writer	Album	Year	Ref.
"Under the Sky" (하늘 아래서)	Iggy; Hong Beom-gyu; Kim Woong	Flower Bud	2015	

== V ==
Song	Writer	Album	Year	Ref.
"Vacation"	Iggy; Youngbae	Sunny Summer	2018	

== W ==
Song	Writer	Album	Year	Ref.
"White" (하얀마음)	Iggy; Youngbae	Season of Glass	2015	
"Water Flower" (물꽃놀이)	Hong; Kim Woong; Iggy	LOL	2016	
"Windy Windy" (바람 바람 바람)	Boombastic	Sunny Summer	2018	
"Wish" (바라)	MosPick	Fever Season	2019	
"Wheel of the Year" (앞면의 뒷면의 뒷면)	Hwang Hyun (MonoTree); Mayu Wakisaka	回:Walpurgis Night	2020	

== Y ==
Song	Writer	Album	Year	Ref.
"You Are My Star" (별)	Lee Shin-seong; ZigZag Note	Time for the Moon Night	2018	
"You Are Not Alone"	Iggy; Youngbae	Time for Us	2019	

== Other songs ==
Song	Writer	Album	Year	Ref.
"Wave" (파도)	—	—	2016	
"Letter in My Pocket" (주머니 속 편지)	—	Pokémon the Movie XY&Z OST	2016	
"Wanna Be"	—	What's Wrong with Secretary Kim OST	2018	
"ZZAN" (짠)	—	Just One Bite Season 2 OST	2019	
