= Labyrinth (EP) =

- Digital and Crossroads version cover

EP by GFriend
- Released: February 3, 2020
- Recorded: 2019–2020
- Studio: Source Studios, Big Hit Studios
- Genre: K-pop; synth-pop; EDM; rock; R&B
- Length: 20:35
- Label: Source; kakao M

GFriend chronology
Fallin' Light (2019)	Labyrinth (2020)	Song of the Sirens (2020)

Singles from Labyrinth
- 1. "Crossroads" Released: February 3, 2020

Labyrinth (stylized as 回:LABYRINTH) is the eighth extended play (EP) and 5th anniversary debut commemorate album by South Korean girl group GFriend. The album was released on February 3, 2020, by Source Music and distributed by kakao M. The release marked the group's first album in seven months, following Fever Season and the group's first project since Source Music was acquired by the company Big Hit Entertainment (now known as Hybe Corporation) in 2019. The EP contains six songs including the lead single "Crossroads". Musically, it is a K-pop album with influences of various styles and genres including synth-pop, EDM and rock. Commercially, the EP topped the Gaon Album Chart upon debut. GFriend promoted the album with live performances on South Korean music shows, winning a total of 7 music show awards.

== Release and promotion ==
Logo used for promotion of 回:Labyrinth.

On January 16, it was reported that GFriend would make comeback in early February with a mini-album titled 回:Labyrinth. It marks the group's first release after Big Hit Entertainment acquired their record label Source Music in 2019. On January 20, GFriend released a comeback timetable through the group's official SNS channel, containing the schedule for the content release of 回:Labyrinth. The schedule showed sequentially the dates of releases of the track list, concept photo, music video teaser, highlight medley, and music video. Preorders began on the same day. On January 21, the group released a teaser video titled "A Tale of the Glass Bead: Previous Story" through Big Hit Entertainment's official YouTube channel. The teaser is a compilation of the music videos of the title tracks of Gfriend's previous releases. The video begins with scenes from music videos of "Love Whisper" released in 2017, and shifts between those of "Glass Bead" and "Fingertip". Through this teaser, Gfriend announced the beginning of a full-fledged growth musical narrative based on organically connected storytelling. The full tracklist of the album was released on January 22. From January 27 to January 29, the group released three pairs of different versions of concept photos. On January 30, the group released the official trailer of the music video for the lead single "Crossroads". On January 31, Big Hit released a "Highlight Medley" video on YouTube, containing the highlights of the album tracks. The EP was released on February 3 in CD and digital formats. It was released seven months after the release of their previous offering Fever Season. An accompanying music video for the lead single, "Crossroads" was released in conjunction with the release of the album. It shows "the ups and downs of relationships between the six members of GFriend as choices are made." The video is emotional and features the six members trying to find and repair their relationships with each other. It is devoid of any choreography to emphasize on storytelling. It connects the story-lines of the group's past music videos of "Fingertip" and "Time for the Moon Night" by presenting Eunha as the forlorn main character in an attempt to reunite with the rest of the group and alludes to intermittent theme of bright butterflies. On February 12, a special clip of their song "Labyrinth" was uploaded on the 1theK Originals YouTube channel.

On launch day, the group held a showcase to promote the album at Yes24 Live Hall in Gwangjin-gu, Seoul which was broadcast on Naver's V Live channel. The showcase was canceled for the public due to concerns about the spread of the coronavirus, and tickets were refunded. The group promoted the album with performances of "Crossroads" and "Labyrinth" on various South Korean music shows starting with Mnet's M Countdown! on February 7. The group also promoted the songs on KBS's Music Bank and SBS's Inkigayo. On February 11, the title track won its first award on SBS MTV's The Show, bringing GFriend's music show awards tally to 60 since their debut. In the last week of the album's promotion, the group performed the song "Labyrinth" instead of the title track "Crossroads", and concluded the promotions with 7 music show wins. On February 23, GFriend canceled a last minute fan sign event due to the coronavirus outbreak in South Korea.

== Artwork and packaging ==
Gfriend released 3 versions for 回:Labyrinth: "Crossroads", "Room" and "Twisted", each containing a pair of different concept photos. The first photo of the "Crossroads" shows the members standing on the intersection of a cracked train track, staring with expressionless faces. In another photo, the members are seen staring at each other, in the backdrop of a vast reed field. Crossroads version relays a vague and lonely mood. The first photo of the "Room" version shows the members staring at the camera with face devoid of expressions, in the light coming through the windows. The second photo shows the members together but engaged in different thoughts and actions. Room version conveys a relaxing yet indifferent atmosphere. The first photo of the "Twisted" version shows the members wearing the same white dresses, entangled together by colourful threads while the second photo sees them closing their eyes in the same posture. Twisted version portrays a calm and dream-like atmosphere.

== Production and composition ==
The album consists of six tracks. Big Hit's in-house producers, Adora and Frants, led by co-CEO Bang Si-hyuk, participated in lyric-writing and the overall creative process of the EP. "Labyrinth" is an EDM and rock song with distorted guitar instrumentation and contains vocal harmonies. The lyrics were written by Bang, Jo Yoon-kyung, Noh Joo-hwan, Adora and Sophia Pae. The lead single "Crossroads" is a synth-pop song with a retro Eighties pop beat and a dance rhythm. It features string instrumentation and powerful melodies. The song is written by Noh Joo-hwan and produced by Lee Won-jong and Noh Joo-hwan. The lyrics are melancholic, in which the group sings about "a girl who stands at a crossroads, contemplating whether to stay or move forward in the course of growing up." "Eclipse" is an "exotic" pop song with influences of tango music and contains string glissandos. "Here we are" is an emotional song with mild J-pop chord influences. It was written and produced by Jeong Ho-hyeon. "Dreamcatcher" is a synth-pop track with an exotic rhythm and R&B grooves that add to its dark atmosphere. "From me" is a sincere acoustic track that showcases the group's "calm and unique" voices. The song was written by Noh Joo-hwan, Jeina Choi and "hitman"bang".

== Critical reception ==
Professional ratings
Review scores
Source	Rating
IZM	3.5/5 stars

Billboard's Tamar Herman described the title track "Crossroads" as a synth-pop that is essentially GFriend for its melody. IZM's Hwang Sun-Up compared the group's sound with the Korean music scene, stating, "K-pop has become a global phenomenon and companies are looking for international composers to produce trendy sounds. However, GFriend always was out of the mainstream environment". He further added that "[the group] has stabilized a unique identity of any other group".

== Commercial performance ==
The album sold 29,000 copies on its first day on Hanteo and broke the group's personal record with 54,000 copies in South Korean territory in the first week, passing the mark of their previous EP, Fever Season. In the South Korean main table, the Gaon Album Chart, Labyrinth debuted at number one and became the group's fourth launch to accomplish this feat.

== Track listing ==
Track listing for Labyrinth
No.	Title	Lyrics	Music	Arrangement	Length
1.	"Labyrinth"	"Hitman" Bang; Jo Yoon-kyung; Noh Joo-hwan; Adora; Sophia Pae	Noh Joo-hwan; Lee Won-jong; Kim Jung-woo; Frants; Sophia Pae; Carlos K; Adora; Kim Yeon-seo	Noh Joo-hwan; Lee Won-jong; Kim Jung-woo; Frants	3:21
2.	"Crossroads" (교차로; Gyocharo)	Noh Joo-hwan	Noh Joo-hwan; Lee Won-jong	Noh Joo-hwan; Lee Won-jong	3:23
3.	"Here We Are"	Jeong Ho-hyeon (e.one)	Jeong Ho-hyeon (e.one)	Jeong Ho-hyeon (e.one)	3:27
4.	"Eclipse" (지금 만나러 갑니다; Jigeum mannareo gamnida; lit. I'm going to meet you now)	Score (13); Megatone (13); Door (13)	Score (13); Megatone (13); Door (13)	Score (13); Megatone (13)	3:25
5.	"Dreamcatcher"	Kim Yeon-seo; Dvwn; MinGtion	Kim Yeon-seo; Dvwn; MinGtion	MinGtion	3:18
6.	"From Me"	Noh Joo-hwan; Jeina Choi; "Hitman" Bang	Noh Joo-hwan; Lee Won-jong	Noh Joo-hwan; Lee Won-jong	3:41
Total length:					20:35

== Charts ==
=== Weekly charts ===
Weekly chart performance for 回:Labyrinth
Chart (2020)	Peak position
Japanese Albums (Oricon)	43
South Korean Albums (Gaon)	1

=== Monthly charts ===
Monthly chart performance for 回:Labyrinth
Chart (February 2020)	Position
Albums (Gaon)	4

== Accolades ==
Listicles
Critic/Publication	List	Song	Rank	Ref.
MTV	Best K-Pop B-sides of 2020	"Labyrinth"	9	

== Release history ==
Release dates and formats for 回:Labyrinth
Region	Date	Format	Label	Ref.
Various	February 3, 2020	CD; digital download; streaming	Source Music; kakao M	

== See also ==
- List of Gaon Album Chart number ones of 2020
