= Crossroads (GFriend song) =

2020 single by GFriend

- Japanese version cover

Single by GFriend

from the EP Labyrinth
- B-side: "Labyrinth"
- Released: February 3, 2020; October 14, 2020 (Japanese version)
- Genre: K-pop; dance; ballad
- Length: 3:23
- Label: Source; kakao M; King
- Songwriter: Noh Joo-hwan
- Producers: Noh Joo-hwan; Lee Won-jong

GFriend singles chronology
"Fallin' Light" (2019)	"Crossroads" (2020)	"Apple" (2020)

Music video
- "Crossroads" on YouTube

"Crossroads" (Korean: 교차로; RR: Gyocharo) is a song recorded by South Korean girl group GFriend for their eighth extended play 回:Labyrinth. The song was released as the title track of the EP on February 3, 2020 by Source Music. The Japanese single album 回:Labyrinth ~Crossroads~ was released on October 14, 2020 by King Records, including the Japanese versions of "Crossroads" and "Labyrinth".

== Composition ==
"Crossroads"
A 29-second sample of "Crossroads", a dance and ballad song.

The song was written by Noh Jooh-wan and was produced by him and Lee Won-jong. They both already made other GFriend songs such as "Time for the Moon Night" and "Sunrise". It was described by Billboard's Tamar Herman, as a song which is "quintessentially GFriend with its melodic, string-oriented soaring synth-pop as the members sing about".

On November 9, 2020, the song was included in the group third studio album 回:Walpurgis Night.

== Chart performance ==
The song debuted and peaked at number 32 on the Gaon Digital Chart for the week ending February 7, 2020.

== Music video ==
The music video for the song was released on February 3, 2020, at the same moment as the EP. For the first time, it was uploaded on HYBE Labels' YouTube channel after that the company Big Hit Entertainment (now known as Hybe Corporation) acquired Source Music in July 2019.

== Track listing ==
- Download and streaming
1. "Crossroads" – 3:22
- 回:Labyrinth ~Crossroads~
1. "Crossroads" (Japanese version) – 3:22
2. "Labyrinth" (Japanese version) – 3:23

== Accolades ==
Music program awards
Program	Date	Ref.
The Show	February 11, 2020	
The Show	February 18, 2020	
M Countdown	February 13, 2020	
M Countdown	February 20, 2020	
Music Bank	February 14, 2020	
Inkigayo	February 16, 2020	
Show Champion	February 19, 2020	

== Charts ==
=== Weekly charts ===
Chart (2020)	Peak position
South Korea (Gaon)	32
South Korea (Kpop Hot 100)	20

=== Monthly charts ===
Chart (February 2020)	Position
South Korea (Gaon)	71

== Release history ==
Release dates and formats for "Crossroads"
Region	Date	Format	Label	Ref.
Various	February 3, 2020	CD; digital download; streaming	Source Music; kakao M	
Japan	October 14, 2020	Digital download; streaming	King Records	

== See also ==
- List of Music Bank Chart winners (2020)
- List of Inkigayo Chart winners (2020)
- List of M Countdown Chart winners (2020)
