= Show Champion =

South Korean television program

- Genre: Music
- Presented by: Jeon Minwook; Jang Yeojun
- Country of origin: South Korea
- Original language: Korean
- No. of seasons: 7
- No. of episodes: 603

Production
- Running time: 80 minutes
- Production company: MBC Plus

Original release
- Network: MBC Every 1 (South Korea); ALL THE K-POP (Worldwide via YouTube live streaming)
- Release: February 14, 2012 – present

Show Champion (Korean: 쇼 챔피언) is a South Korean music television program broadcast live by MBC M every Wednesday at Bitmaru Broadcasting Center in Ilsan.

== Hosts ==
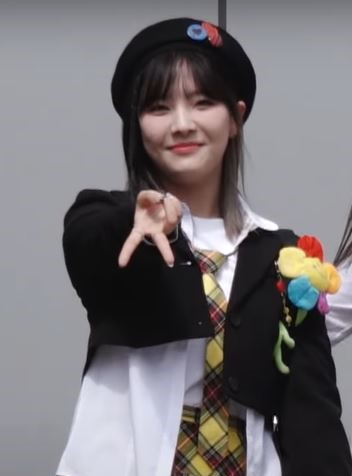
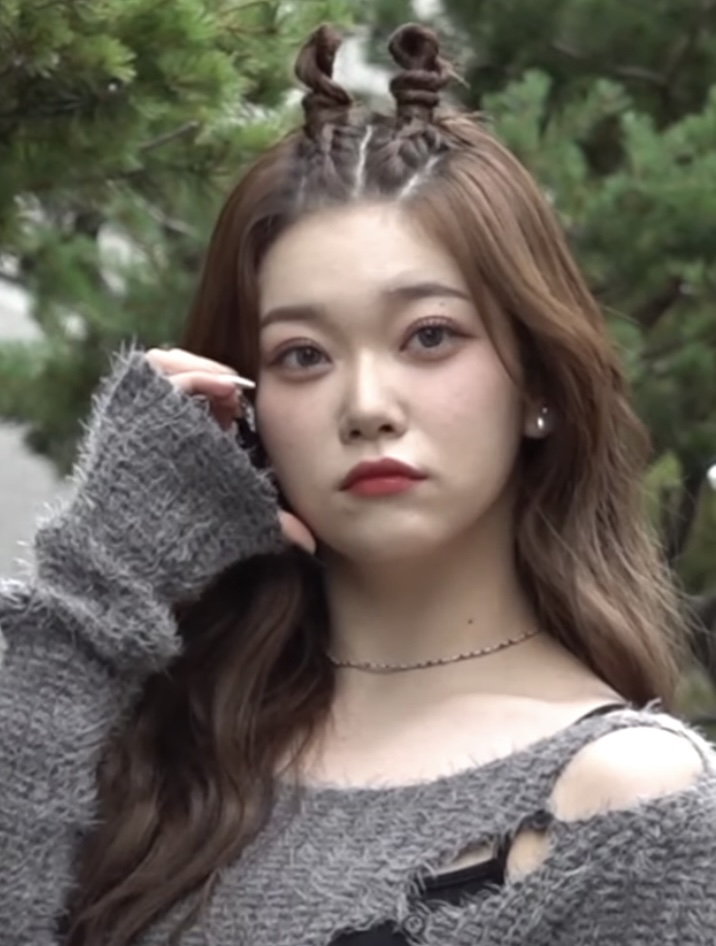
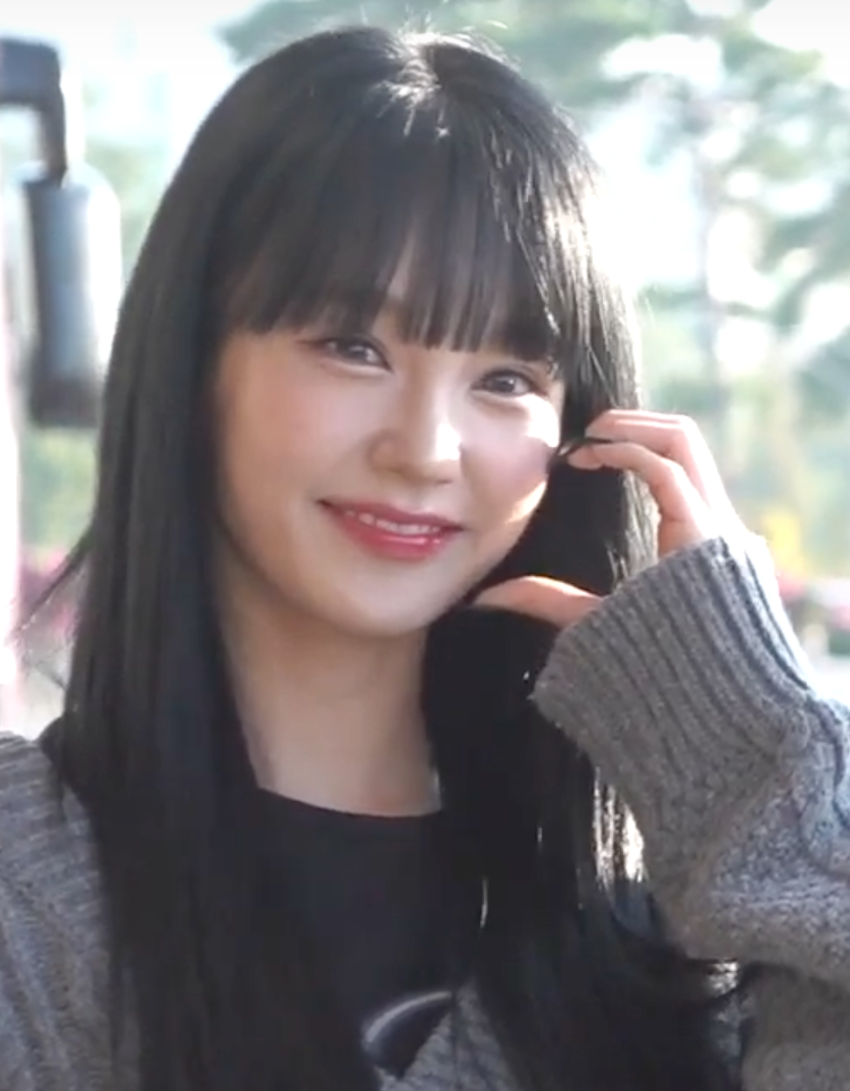
Billlie's Moon Sua (left) & Tsuki (center) and Woo!ah!'s Nana (right) were the co-hosts of Show Champion from February to November 2023.
- Shindong (February 14, 2012 – December 25, 2012)
- Hahm Eun-jung (January 30, 2013 – August 28, 2013)
- Amber (January 30, 2013 – December 18, 2013)
- Kangin (January 8, 2014 – November 26, 2014)
- Doyoung, Jaehyun (January 21, 2015 – July 1, 2015)
- Kim Shin-young (July 8, 2015 – December 11, 2019)
- Moonbin, Yoon San-ha, Kangmin (March 4, 2020 – October 26, 2022)
- Moon Sua, Tsuki, Nana (February 8, 2023 – November 15, 2023)
- Gaon, Keum (February 21, 2024 – March 26, 2025)
- Minwook, Yeojun, Seongmo (May 14, 2025 – July 8, 2026)
- Minwook, Yeojun (July 15, 2026 – Present)

== Chart point system ==
In 2013, the show switched from a pre-recorded format to a live show format. New changes to the show started with the episode on January 30, 2013. Since 2015 it also has a Triple Crown system used in Inkigayo and The Show, where the song is not eligible for top 3 anymore after winning three times.

Starting from July 14, 2021, Show Champion revealed the scores like every other show on their website, instead of just announcing winners. The tracking time is also revealed to be from Monday to Sunday.

Every song, as long as they are in the week's pre-vote list and have not yet had a triple-crown, is eligible for this chart. Though Show Champion is a cable music show, there's no requirement for artists to attend or promote. The time limit in the pre-vote list is unknown.

Criteria that is currently used and was used in Show Champion ranking system:

Period covered	Chart system					
Period covered	Broadcast	Digital sales	Physical album	Professional judges	Video views	Voting and netizen ranking
Prior to 2013	15%	45%	10%	15%	N/A	15% (netizen ranking)
2013 – June 28, 2017	N/A	50%	20%	15%	N/A	10% (netizen ranking)
July 5, 2017 – 2018	15%	40%	10%	15%	N/A	20%
2018 – February 12, 2020	10%	30%	10%	10%	N/A	40%
February 12, 2020 – July 7, 2021	20%	50% (digital + physical)		10%	10%	20%
July 14, 2021 – present	20%	35%	15%	10%	10%	20%

Based source and explanations for each criterion

- Broadcast: Artists should participate in MBC M Shows to get Broadcast Score
- Digital sales: Number of streaming and download based on Korean chart, Currently is Melon, Genie, FLO, Bugs. Former based source included Naver Music and Soribada.
- Physical album: Number of copies based on Hanteo album chart
- Professional judges or critics' choice: Score based on judgement by MBC Music's staff
- Video views or SNS: YouTube views, counted from official MV only.
- Voting and netizen ranking: Voting and netizen choices happens before show start. Currently via Idol Champ app. Previously app and website used include Genie (until 2020), Melon (until 2018). Current pre-voting times is from Friday to Monday (previously is Thursday to Sunday).

== Champion Song winners ==
=== 2012 ===
List of Champion Songs

February

- 02.21 – F.T. Island – "Severely"
- 02.28 – Miss A – "Touch"

March

- 03.06 – Miss A – "Touch"
- 03.13 – John Park – "Falling"
- 03.20 – 2AM – "I Wonder If You Hurt Like Me"
- 03.27 – Shinee – "Sherlock•셜록 (Clue + Note)"

April

- 04.03 – Shinee – "Sherlock•셜록 (Clue + Note)"
- 04.10 – CNBLUE – "Hey You"
- 04.17 – 4Minute – "Volume Up"
- 04.24 – 4Minute – "Volume Up"

May

- 05.01 – Sistar – "Alone"
- 05.08 – Girls' Generation-TTS – "Twinkle"
- 05.15 – Girls' Generation-TTS – "Twinkle"
- 05.22 – Girls' Generation-TTS – "Twinkle"
- 05.29 – No Show

June

- 06.05 – Infinite – "The Chaser"
- 06.12 – Wonder Girls – "Like This"
- 06.19 – Wonder Girls – "Like This"
- 06.26 – f(x) – "Electric Shock"

July

- 07.03 – f(x) – "Electric Shock"
- 07.10 – Super Junior – "Sexy, Free & Single"
- 07.17 – Super Junior – "Sexy, Free & Single"
- 07.24 – Super Junior – "Sexy, Free & Single"
- 07.31 – No Show

August

- 08.07 – No Show
- 08.14 – BoA – "Only One"
- 08.21 – Beast – "Beautiful Night"
- 08.28 – Kara – "Pandora"

(Starting from September 4, 2012, the ranking system was abolished but was revived later on January 30, 2013)

=== 2013 ===
List of Champion Songs

January

- 01.30 – CNBLUE – "I'm Sorry"

February

- 02.06 – CNBLUE – "I'm Sorry"
- 02.13 – CNBLUE – "I'm Sorry"
- 02.20 – Sistar19 – "Gone Not Around Any Longer"
- 02.27 – Shinee – "Dream Girl"

March

- 03.06 – Shinee – "Dream Girl"
- 03.13 – Shinee – "Dream Girl"
- 03.20 – Shinee – "Dream Girl"
- 03.27 – 2AM – "One Spring Day"

April

- 04.03 – Infinite – "Man In Love"
- 04.10 – Davichi – "Turtle"
- 04.17 – K.Will – "Love Blossom"
- 04.24 – K.Will – "Love Blossom"

May

- 05.01 – Cho Yong-pil – "Hello"
- 05.08 – 4Minute – "What's Your Name?"
- 05.15 – 4Minute – "What's Your Name?"
- 05.22 – 4Minute – "What's Your Name?"
- 05.29 – Shinhwa – "This Love"

June

- 06.05 – Shinhwa – "This Love"
- 06.12 – Lee Hyori – "Bad Girls"
- 06.19 – Exo – "Wolf"
- 06.26 – Sistar – "Give It to Me"

July

- 07.03 – <Mid-Year Special – No Chart>
- 07.10 – Dynamic Duo – "BAAAM"
- 07.17 – Apink – "No No No"
- 07.24 – Ailee – "U&I"
- 07.31 – Infinite – "Destiny"

August

- 08.07 – f(x) – "Rum Pum Pum Pum"
- 08.14 – <MBC Show Champion Sokcho Festival – No Chart>
- 08.21 – Exo – "Growl"
- 08.28 – Exo – "Growl"

September

- 09.04 – Exo – "Growl"
- 09.11 – Teen Top – "Rocking"
- 09.18 – Kara – "Damaged Lady"
- 09.25 – Kara – "Damaged Lady"

October

- 10.02 – Busker Busker – "Love, at first"
- 10.09 – Busker Busker – "Love, at first"
- 10.16 – IU – "The Red Shoes"
- 10.23 – Shinee – "Everybody"
- 10.30 – Shinee – "Everybody"

November

- 11.06 – Trouble Maker – "Now"
- 11.13 – Miss A – "Hush"
- 11.20 – Trouble Maker – "Now"
- 11.27 – <No Chart and Winner>

December

- 12.04 – Hyolyn – "One Way Love"
- 12.11 – <No Chart and Winner>
- 12.18 – Exo – "Miracles in December
- 12.25 – <No Chart and Winner>

=== 2014 ===
List of Champion Songs

Episode	Date	Artist	Song
—	January 1	No Chart and Winner	
90	January 8	Girl's Day	"Something"
91	January 15	Ailee	"Singing Got Better"
92	January 22	B1A4	"Lonely"
93	January 29	B1A4	"Lonely"
94	February 5	B1A4	"Lonely"
95	February 12	B.A.P	"1004 (Angel)"
96	February 19	Soyou & JunggiGo	"Some"
97	February 26	Special Episode, winner not announced	
98	March 5	CNBLUE	"Can't Stop"
99	March 12	Girls' Generation	"Mr.Mr."
100	March 19	Girls' Generation	"Mr.Mr."
101	March 26	Special Episode, winner not announced	
—	April 2	No Chart and Winner	
102	April 9	Apink	"Mr. Chu"
103	April 16	Mad Clown ft. Hyolyn	"Without You"
—	April 23	No Episode, winner not announced	
—	April 30	No Episode, winner not announced	
—	May 7	No Episode, winner not announced	
104	May 14	Exo-K	"Overdose"
105	May 21	Wheesung	"Night and Day"
106	May 28	Infinite	"Last Romeo"
107	June 4	Infinite	"Last Romeo"
108	June 11	VIXX	"Eternity"
—	June 18	No Chart and Winner	
109	June 25	Special Episode, winner not announced	
110	July 2	Beast	"Good Luck"
111	July 9	K.Will	"Day 1"
112	July 16	f(x)	"Red Light"
113	July 23	B1A4	"Solo Day"
114	July 30	Girl's Day	"Darling"
115	August 6	Hyuna	"Red"
116	August 13	Hyuna	"Red"
117	August 20	Block B	"H.E.R"
118	August 27	Kara	"Mamma Mia"
119	September 3	Sistar	"I Swear"
120	September 10	Super Junior	"Mamacita"
121	September 17	Super Junior	"Mamacita"
122	September 24	Teen Top	"Missing"
—	October 1	No Chart and Winner	
—	October 8	No Chart and Winner	
123	October 15	Ailee	"Don't Touch Me"
124	October 22	VIXX	"Error"
125	October 29	Beast	"12:30"
126	November 5	Special Episode, winner not announced	
—	November 12	No Chart and Winner	
127	November 19	AOA	"Like a Cat"
128	November 26	Kyuhyun	"At Gwanghwamun"
—	December 3	No Chart and Winner	
—	December 10	No Chart and Winner	
—	December 17	No Chart and Winner	
—	December 24	No Chart and Winner	
—	December 31	No Chart and Winner	

=== 2015 ===
List of Champion Songs

Episode	Date	Artist	Song
—	January 7	No Chart and Winner	
—	January 14	No Chart and Winner	
129	January 21	Jonghyun	"Déjà-Boo"
130	January 28	Mad Clown	"Fire"
131	February 4	Jung Yonghwa	"One Fine Day"
132	February 11	Zion.T & Crush	"Just"
133	February 18	4Minute	"Crazy"
134	February 25	4Minute	"Crazy"
135	March 4	VIXX	"Love Equation"
136	March 11	Shinhwa	"Sniper"
137	March 18	Shinhwa	"Sniper"
138	March 25	Minah	"I Am a Woman Too"
139	April 1	Red Velvet	"Ice Cream Cake"
140	April 8	Exo	"Call Me Baby"
141	April 15	Exo	"Call Me Baby"
142	April 22	Exo	"Call Me Baby"
143	April 29	EXID	"Ah Yeah"
144	May 6	EXID	"Ah Yeah"
145	May 13	BTS	"I Need U"
146	May 20	Big Bang	"Loser"
147	May 27	Shinee	"View"
—	June 3	No Chart and Winner	
148	June 10	Exo	"Love Me Right"
149	June 17	Exo	"Love Me Right"
150	June 24	Exo	"Love Me Right"
151	July 1	AOA	"Heart Attack"
152	July 8	Sistar	"Shake It"
153	July 15	Girls' Generation	"Party"
154	July 22	Infinite	"Bad"
—	July 29	Apink	"Remember"
155	August 5	Beast	"YeY"
156	August 12	Shinee	"Married to the Music"
157	August 19	B1A4	"Sweet Girl"
158	August 26	Girls' Generation	"Lion Heart"
—	September 2	No Chart and Winner	
—	September 9	No Chart and Winner	
159	September 16	Red Velvet	"Dumb Dumb"
160	September 23	CNBLUE	"Cinderella"
161	September 30	Special Episode, winner not announced	
162	October 7	Ailee	"Mind Your Own Business"
163	October 14	Taeyeon	"I"
164	October 21	BtoB	"Way Back Home"
—	October 28	No Chart and Winner	
—	November 4	No Chart and Winner	
—	November 11	No Chart and Winner	
165	November 18	VIXX	"Chained Up"
166 (Note: Episode number for the 4th week of November and 1st week of December were both numbered 166 on Show Champion's Twitter account and MBC Plus YouTube channel.)	November 25	EXID	"Hot Pink"
166	December 2	Dynamic Duo	"Jam"
167	December 9	BTS	"Run"
168	December 16	BTS	"Run"
169	December 23	Special Episode, winner not announced	
—	December 30	No Chart and Winner	

=== 2016 ===
List of Champion Songs

Episode	Date	Artist	Song
—	January 6	No Chart and Winner	
—	January 13	No Chart and Winner	
170	January 20	Special Episode, winner not announced	
171	January 27	Crush	"Don't Forget (feat. Taeyeon)"
172	February 3	GFriend	"Rough"
173	February 10	Winner	"Sentimental"
174	February 17	GFriend	"Rough"
175	February 24	GFriend	"Rough"
176	March 2	Taemin	"Press Your Number"
177	March 9	Mamamoo	"You're The Best"
178	March 16	Mamamoo	"You're The Best"
179	March 23	Red Velvet	"One of These Nights"
180	March 30	Got7	"Fly"
181	April 6	BtoB	"Remember That"
182	April 13	CNBLUE	"You're So Fine"
183	April 20	Block B	"Toy"
184	April 27	VIXX	"Dynamite"
185	May 4	Seventeen	"Pretty U"
186	May 11	Seventeen	"Pretty U"
187	May 18	Tiffany	"I Just Wanna Dance"
188	May 25	AOA	"Good Luck"
189	June 1	Jonghyun	"She Is"
190	June 8	EXID	"L.I.E."
—	June 15	No Chart and Winner	
191	June 22	Exo	"Monster"
192	June 29	Sistar	"I Like That"
193	July 6	Sistar	"I Like That"
194	July 13	Beast	"Ribbon"
195	July 20	GFriend	"Navillera"
196	July 27	Special Episode, winner not announced	
—	August 3	No Show, winner not announced	
197	August 10	GFriend	"Navillera"
198	August 17	I.O.I	"Whatta Man"
199	August 24	VIXX	"Fantasy"
200	August 31	Exo	"Lotto"
—	September 7	No Show, winner not announced	
201	September 14	Special Episode, winner not announced	
202	September 21	Red Velvet	"Russian Roulette"
203	September 28	Im Chang Jung	"The Love That I Committed"
—	October 5	No Show, winner not announced	
—	October 12	No Show, winner not announced	
204	October 19	BTS	"Blood Sweat & Tears"
205	October 26	I.O.I	"Very Very Very"
206	November 2	Twice	"TT"
207	November 9	VIXX	"The Closer"
—	November 16	No Show, winner not announced	
—	November 23	No Show, winner not announced	
208	November 30	Sejeong	"Flower Way"
—	December 7	No Chart and Winner	
209	December 14	B1A4	"A Lie"
210	December 21	Seventeen	"Boom Boom"
—	December 28	No Chart and Winner	

=== 2017 ===
List of Champion Songs

Episode	Date	Artist	Song
—	January 4	No Chart and Winner	
211	January 11	Special Episode, winner not announced	
212	January 18	AOA	"Excuse Me"
213	January 25	AOA	"Excuse Me"
214	February 1	Special Episode, winner not announced	
215	February 8	Red Velvet	"Rookie"
216	February 15	Red Velvet	"Rookie"
217	February 22	BTS	"Spring Day"
218	March 1	Twice	"Knock Knock"
219	March 8	Twice	"Knock Knock"
220	March 15	BtoB	"Movie"
221	March 22	Got7	"Never Ever"
222	March 29	Highlight	"Plz Don't Be Sad"
223	April 5	Girl's Day	"I'll Be Yours"
224	April 12	IU	"Through The Night"
225	April 19	Jung Eun-ji	"The Spring"
226	April 26	EXID	"Night Rather Than Day"
—	May 3	No Chart and Winner	
227	May 10	Special Episode, winner not announced	
228	May 17	IU	"Palette"
229	May 24	Twice	"Signal"
230	May 31	Twice	"Signal"
231	June 7	Seventeen	"Don't Wanna Cry"
232	June 14	Seventeen	"Don't Wanna Cry"
233	June 21	G-Dragon	"Untitled, 2014"
234	June 28	Mamamoo	"Yes I Am"
235	July 5	Apink	"Five"
236	July 12	Apink	"Five"
237	July 19	Red Velvet	"Red Flavor"
238	July 26	Exo	"Ko Ko Bop"
239	August 2	Exo	"Ko Ko Bop"
240	August 9	GFriend	"Love Whisper"
241	August 16	Wanna One	"Energetic"
242	August 23	Wanna One	"Energetic"
243	August 30	Wanna One	"Energetic"
244	September 6	Sunmi	"Gashina"
245	September 13	Exo	"Power"
246	September 20	Special Episode, winner not announced	
247	September 27	BTS	"DNA"
—	October 4	No Chart and Winner	
—	October 11	No Chart and Winner	
248	October 18	NU'EST W	"Where You At"
249	October 25	BtoB	"Missing You"
250	November 1	BtoB	"Missing You"
251	November 8	Twice	"Likey"
252	November 15	Seventeen	"Clap"
253	November 22	Wanna One	"Beautiful"
—	November 29	No Chart and Winner	
—	December 6	No Chart and Winner	
—	December 13	No Chart and Winner	
—	December 20	No Chart and Winner	
—	December 27	No Chart and Winner	

=== 2018 ===
List of Champion Songs

Episode	Date	Artist	Song
—	January 3	No Chart and Winner	
254	January 10	Exo	"Universe"
255	January 17	Infinite	"Tell Me"
256	January 24	Oh My Girl	"Secret Garden"
257	January 31	Momoland	"Bboom Bboom"
258	February 7	Red Velvet	"Bad Boy"
259	February 14	Seventeen	"Thanks"
—	February 21	No Chart and Winner	
—	February 28	No Chart and Winner	
260	March 7	iKon	"Love Scenario"
261	March 14	Mamamoo	"Starry Night"
262	March 21	Wanna One	"I Promise You (I.P.U.)"
263	March 28	Wanna One	"Boomerang"
264	April 4	Wanna One	"Boomerang"
265	April 11	Winner	"Everyday"
266	April 18	Twice	"What Is Love?"
267	April 25	Twice	"What Is Love?"
268	May 2	Twice	"What Is Love?"
269	May 9	GFriend	"Time for the Moon Night"
270	May 16	GFriend	"Time for the Moon Night"
271	May 23	Special Episode, winner not announced	
272	May 30	BTS	"Fake Love"
—	June 6	No Chart and Winner	
273	June 13	Wanna One	"Light"
274	June 20	Wanna One	"Light"
275	June 27	BtoB	"Only One For Me"
—	July 4	No Chart and Winner	
276	July 11	Apink	"I'm So Sick"
277	July 18	Twice	"Dance the Night Away"
278	July 25	Seventeen	"Oh My!"
—	August 1	No Chart and Winner	
279	August 8	Show Special, No Chart and Winner	
280	August 15	Red Velvet	"Power Up"
281	August 22	Red Velvet	"Power Up"
282	August 29	(G)I-dle	"Hann (Alone)"
283	September 5	BTS	"Idol"
284	September 12	BTS	"Idol"
285	September 19	Sunmi	"Siren"
286	September 26	No Chart and Winner	
287	October 3	No Chart and Winner	
288	October 10	iKon	"Goodbye Road"
289	October 14	iKon	"Goodbye Road"
—	October 24	No Chart and Winner	
—	October 31	Monsta X	"Shoot Out"
—	November 7	No Chart and Winner	
291	November 14	Twice	"Yes or Yes"
292	November 21	Twice	"Yes or Yes"
293	November 28	Wanna One	"Spring Breeze"
294	December 5	Wanna One	"Spring Breeze"
295	December 12	Mino	"Fiancé"
296	December 19	Mino	"Fiancé"
—	December 26	No Chart and Winner	

=== 2019 ===
List of Champion Songs

Episode	Date	Artist	Song
297	January 2	Winner	"Millions"
298	January 9	Chungha	"Gotta Go"
299	January 16	Apink	"%% (Eung Eung)"
300	January 23	GFriend	"Sunrise"
301	January 30	Seventeen	"Home"
302	February 6	Special Episode, winner not announced	
303	February 13	Seventeen	"Home"
304	February 20	Taemin	"Want"
305	February 27	Monsta X	"Alligator"
306	March 6	(G)I-dle	"Senorita"
307	March 13	Ha Sung-woon	"Bird"
308	March 20	TXT	"Crown"
309	March 27	Mamamoo	"Gogobebe"
310	April 3	Momoland	"I'm So Hot"
311	April 10	Iz*One	"Violeta"
312	April 17	Iz*One	"Violeta"
313	April 24	BTS	"Boy with Luv"
314	May 1	Twice	"Fancy"
315	May 8	NU'EST	"Bet Bet"
316	May 15	Oh My Girl	"The Fifth Season (SSFWL)"
317	May 22	NU'EST	"Bet Bet"
318	May 29	Kim Jae-hwan	"Begin Again"
319	June 5	AB6IX	"Breathe"
320	June 12	NCT 127	"Superhuman"
321	June 19	Cosmic Girls	"Boogie Up"
322	June 26	Red Velvet	"Zimzalabim"
323	July 3	Chungha	"Snapping"
324	July 10	GFriend	"Fever"
325	July 17	Ha Sung-woon	"Blue"
326	July 24	Day6	"Time of Our Life"
—	July 31	No Chart and Winner	
327	August 7	Itzy	"Icy"
328	August 14	Itzy	"Icy"
329	August 21	Itzy	"Icy"
330	August 28	Red Velvet	"Umpah Umpah"
331	September 4	X1	"Flash"
—	September 11	No Chart and Winner	
332	September 18	X1	"Flash"
333	September 25	Bolbbalgan4	"Workaholic"
334	October 2	Twice	"Feel Special"
335	October 9	Twice	"Feel Special"
336	October 16	AB6IX	"Blind For Love"
337	October 23	Chen	"Shall We?
338	October 30	NU'EST	"Love Me"
—	November 6	No Chart and Winner	
—	November 13	No Chart and Winner	
—	November 20	No Chart and Winner	
—	November 27	No Chart and Winner	
339	December 4	Mamamoo	"Hip"
340	December 11	Exo	"Obsession"
—	December 18	No Chart and Winner	
341	December 25	Special Episode, winner not announced	

=== 2020 ===
List of Champion Songs

Episode	Date	Artist	Song
—	January 1	No Chart and Winner	
—	January 8	No Chart and Winner	
—	January 15	No Chart and Winner	
—	January 22	No Chart and Winner	
—	January 29	No Chart and Winner	
—	February 5	No Chart and Winner	
—	February 12	No Chart and Winner	
342	February 19	GFriend	"Crossroads"
343	February 26	Iz*One	"Fiesta"
344	March 4	BTS	"On"
345	March 11	BTS	"On"
346	March 18	BTS	"On"
347	March 25	Itzy	"Wannabe"
348	April 1	Itzy	"Wannabe"
349	April 8	Kang Daniel	"2U"
—	April 15	No Chart and Winner	
350	April 22	Apink	"Dumhdurum"
351	April 29	Got7	"Not By The Moon"
352	May 6	Oh My Girl	"Nonstop"
353	May 13	Astro	"Knock"
354	May 20	NU'EST	"I'm in Trouble"
355	May 27	TXT	"Can't You See Me?"
356	June 3	Baekhyun	"Candy"
357	June 10	Twice	"More & More"
358	June 17	Twice	"More & More"
359	June 24	Iz*One	"Secret Story of the Swan"
360	July 1	Seventeen	"Left & Right"
361	July 8	Blackpink	"How You Like That"
362	July 15	Blackpink	"How You Like That"
363	July 22	GFriend	"Apple"
364	July 29	Blackpink	"How You Like That"
365	August 5	Ateez	"Inception"
366	August 12	(G)I-dle	"Dumdi Dumdi"
367	August 19	(G)I-dle	"Dumdi Dumdi"
368	August 26	Itzy	"Not Shy"
369	September 2	BTS	"Dynamite"
370	September 9	BTS	"Dynamite"
371	September 16	BTS	"Dynamite"
372	September 23	Stray Kids	"Back Door"
373 (Note: Special Episode, Show Champion's Karaoke Room)	September 30	The Boyz	"The Stealer"
—	October 7	No Chart and Winner	
374	October 14	Blackpink	"Lovesick Girls"
375	October 21	NCT U	"Make A Wish (Birthday Song)"
376	October 28	Seventeen	"HOME;RUN"
377	November 4	Twice	"I Can't Stop Me"
378	November 11	Monsta X	"Love Killa"
379	November 18	GFriend	"Mago"
380	November 25	AKMU	"Happening"
—	December 2	No Chart and Winner	
—	December 9	No Chart and Winner	
—	December 16	No Chart and Winner	
—	December 23	No Chart and Winner	
—	December 30	No Chart and Winner	

=== 2021 – present ===
- 2021
- 2022
- 2023
- 2024
- 2025
- 2026

== Triple Crowns ==
In 2015, Show Champion introduced the triple crown system which refers to when a song achieves three wins (consecutive or non-consecutive) on the show. It is then ineligible to win again and removed from the chart.

List of Triple Crowns

In 2015, Show Champion introduced the triple crown system.

Artist	Song	Year
Exo	"Call Me Baby"	2015
Exo	"Love Me Right"	2015
Girls' Generation	"Lion Heart"	2015
GFriend	"Rough"	2016
GFriend	"Navillera"	2016
Wanna One	"Energetic"	2017
Twice	"What Is Love?"	2018
Seventeen	"Home"	2019
Itzy	"Icy"	2019
X1	"Flash"	2019
Red Velvet	"Psycho"	2020
Zico	"Any Song"	2020
BTS	"On"	2020
Blackpink	"How You Like That"	2020
BTS	"Dynamite"	2020
BTS	"Butter"	2021
Blackpink	"Shut Down"	2022
Jisoo	"Flower"	2023
Stray Kids	"Chk Chk Boom"	2024
BTS	"Swim"	2026

== Achievements by artists ==
List of top 10 songs with highest score (6th system)

Starting from July 14, 2021; Show Champion reveal scores like every other show.

Rank	Artist	Songs	Points	Date
1st	NCT Dream	"Beatbox"	9,810 points	June 8, 2022
2nd	TWS	"Countdown"	9,394 points	April 30, 2025
3rd	Nmixx	"Love Me Like This"	9,176 points	March 29, 2023
4th	(G)I-dle	"Nxde"	8,771 points	October 26, 2022
5th	Fromis 9	"Stay This Way"	8,690 points	July 6, 2022
6th	Ive	"After Like"	8,632 points	August 31, 2022
7th	STAYC	"Stereotype"	8,161 points	September 15, 2021
8th	(G)I-dle	"Queencard"	8,141 points	May 24, 2023
9th	Riize	"Boom Boom Bass"	8,098 points	June 26, 2024
10th	Ive	"Eleven"	8,075 points	December 8, 2021

List of most Champion Song wins

Rank	Artist	Count
1st	BTS	25
2nd	Seventeen	21
3rd	Twice	18
4th	Exo	17
5th	Red Velvet	14
5th	Shinee	14
7th	GFriend	13
8th	Stray Kids	12
9th	Wanna One	11
10th	(G)I-dle	10
10th	Blackpink	10

List of Most Triple Crown winners

Rank	Artist	count
1st	BTS	4 songs
2nd	Exo	2 songs
2nd	GFriend	2 songs
2nd	Blackpink	2 songs

List of longest consecutive Champion Song winners

In 2015, Show Champion ended the unlimited trophy system and introduced the triple crown system.

Rank	Artist	Song	Count	Year
1st	Shinee	"Dream Girl"	4	2013
2nd	Girls' Generation-TTS	"Twinkle"	3	2012
2nd	Super Junior	"Sexy, Free & Single"	3	2012
2nd	CNBLUE	"I'm Sorry"	3	2013
2nd	4Minute	"What's Your Name?"	3	2013
2nd	Exo	"Growl"	3	2013
2nd	B1A4	"Lonely"	3	2014

== End of the Year Awards ==
=== 2015 ===
These are special end-of-the-year broadcast awards. Winners are listed first and highlighted in bold.

Best Champion Songs of 2015	Most appearances
**EXID – "Ah Yeah"**; **Exo – "Call Me Baby"**	**Seventeen**; **GFriend**
Best Audience Rating Stage	Most Spectators
**VIXX – "Love Equation"**; Monsta X; Lovelyz	**Shinhwa**
Best performance – Male	Best performance – Female
**BTS – "Run"**; Shinee – "View"; VIXX – "Chained up"	**EXID – "Hot Pink"**; AOA – "Heart Attack"; Red Velvet – "Dumb Dumb"

== Similar programs ==
- Mnet M Countdown
- SBS Inkigayo
- KBS Music Bank
- MBC Show! Music Core
- Arirang TV Pops in Seoul
- Arirang TV Simply K-Pop (formerly called The M-Wave and Wave K)
- Arirang TV Show K-Pop
- JTBC Music on Top
- JTBC Music Universe K-909
- SBS M The Show

== See also ==
- Music programs of South Korea
