= Sunny Summer (song) =

2018 single by GFriend

Single by GFriend

from the EP Sunny Summer
- Released: July 19, 2018
- Genre: K-pop, synth-pop, funk, soul
- Label: Source; kakao M
- Songwriters: Duble Sidekick; Black Edition
- Producers: Duble Sidekick; Black Edition

GFriend singles chronology
"Time for the Moon Night" (2018)	"Sunny Summer" (2018)	"Memoria" (2018)

Music video
- "Sunny Summer" on YouTube

"Sunny Summer" (Korean: 여름여름해; RR: Yeoreumyeoreumhae) is a song recorded by South Korean girl group GFriend for their seventh extended play of the same name. The song was released by Source Music on July 19, 2018 as the EP title track.

== Composition ==
The song was written and produced by Duble Sidekick and Black Edition. It was described by Billboard's Tamar Herman, as a "bright synth-pop track overflowing with rollicking brass and funky percussion". Lyrically, it is full of nuanced wordplay that incorporate the names of each of the six members.

== Chart performance ==
The song debuted at number 23 on the Gaon Digital Chart, on the week of July 21, 2018. In its second week, the song peaked at number 11. The song charted for 12 consecutive weeks in the Top 100. "Sunny Summer" also debuted at number 25 on the Kpop Hot 100 for the week of July 22, 2018. In its second week, the song peaked at number 10, staying for two consecutive weeks.

The song was the 42nd best-selling song in July, 19th in August and 66th in September 2018.

== Music video ==
A music video for the song was also released on July 19, 2018. The music video starts with a quote from William Shakespeare's Sonnet 43. It also shows segments of hand-waving choreography with clips of the group spending their summer having fun together.

== Charts ==
Chart (2018)	Peak position
South Korea (Gaon)	11
South Korea (Kpop Hot 100)	10
