= Parallel (EP) =

- Digital and "Love" version cover

EP by GFriend
- Released: August 1, 2017
- Genres: K-pop; new jack swing; dance pop
- Length: 25:18
- Label: Source

GFriend chronology
The Awakening (2017)	Parallel (2017)	Time for the Moon Night (2018)

Singles from Parallel
- 1. "Love Whisper" Released: August 1, 2017

Repackage album cover

Singles from Rainbow
- 1. "Summer Rain" Released: September 13, 2017

Parallel (stylized in all caps) is the fifth extended play (EP) by South Korean girl group GFriend. The EP was released digitally and physically by Source Music on August 1, 2017 and distributed by LOEN Entertainment. The album contains eight songs, including the single "Love Whisper", and one instrumental track. It has sold over 60,000 physical copies as of August 2017. The extended play was re-released on September 13 under the title Rainbow with the single "Summer Rain" and a bonus track of the same name.

== Commercial performance ==
=== Parallel ===
Parallel debuted at number 3 on the Gaon Album Chart, on the chart for July 30 – August 5, 2017. The EP also debuted at number 10 on the US World Albums chart, on the week ending August 19. The EP debuted at number 5 on the Gaon Album Chart, for the month of August 2017 with 61,473 physical copies sold.

Three songs from the EP entered the Gaon Digital Chart on the chart issue dated July 30 – August 5, 2017: "Love Whisper" at number 2; "One Half" at number 52 and "Ave Maria" at number 72.

=== Rainbow ===
Rainbow debuted at number 2 on the Gaon Album Chart for September 10–16, 2017.

The two new songs from the repackage EP entered the Gaon Digital Chart for September 10–16, 2017. "Summer Rain" charted at number 11 and "Rainbow" at number 86.

== Track listing ==
Parallel
No.	Title	Lyrics	Music	Arrangement	Length
1.	"Intro (Belief)"		Iggy; Seo	Iggy; Seo	1:12
2.	"Love Whisper" (귀를 기울이면; Gwireul Giurimyeon, lit. "If You Listen")	Iggy; Youngbae	Iggy; Youngbae	Iggy; Youngbae	3:32
3.	"Ave Maria" (두 손을 모아; Du Soneul Moa, lit "Put Your Hands Together")	Megatone; Ferdy	Megatone; Ferdy	Megatone; Ferdy	3:17
4.	"One Half" (이분의 일 1/2; Yibun-ui Il 1/2)	Iggy; Youngbae	Iggy; Youngbae	Iggy; Youngbae	3:34
5.	"Life Is a Party"	Mafly; Ponde	Hyuk Shin; RE:ONE; Davey Nate	RE:ONE	2:59
6.	"Red Umbrella" (빨간 우산; Ppalgan Usan)	Heuktae	Heuktae; Jang Jungseok	Jang Jungseok	3:26
7.	"Falling Asleep Again" (그루잠; Geurujam)	Mafly	Noh Joohwan; Lee Wonjong	Noh Joohwan; Lee Wonjong	3:43
8.	"Love Whisper" (Instrumental)		Iggy; Youngbae	Iggy; Youngbae	3:32
Total length:					25:18

Rainbow – Reissue
No.	Title	Lyrics	Music	Arrangement	Length
1.	"Intro (Belief)"		Iggy; Seo	Iggy; Seo	1:12
2.	"Love Whisper" (귀를 기울이면; Gwireul Giurimyeon, lit. "If You Listen")	Iggy; Youngbae	Iggy; Youngbae	Iggy; Youngbae	3:32
3.	"Summer Rain" (여름비; Yeoreumbi)	Iggy; Youngbae	Iggy; Youngbae	Iggy; Youngbae	3:20
4.	"Rainbow"	Mafly	Fuxxy; Vincenzo; Any Masingga; Anna Timgren	Fuxxy	3:52
5.	"Ave Maria" (두 손을 모아; Du Soneul Moa, lit "Put Your Hands Together")	Megatone; Ferdy	Megatone; Ferdy	Megatone; Ferdy	3:17
6.	"One Half" (이분의 일 1/2; Yibuneui Il 1/2)	Iggy; Youngbae	Iggy; Youngbae	Iggy; Youngbae	3:34
7.	"Life Is a Party"	Mafly; Ponde	Hyuk Shin; RE:ONE; Davey Nate	RE:ONE	2:59
8.	"Red Umbrella" (빨간 우산; Ppalgan Usan)	Heuktae	Heuktae; Jang Jungseok	Jang Jungseok	3:26
9.	"Falling Asleep Again" (그루잠; Geurujam)	Mafly	Noh Joohwan; Lee Wonjong	Noh Joohwan; Lee Wonjong	3:43
10.	"Summer Rain" (Instrumental)		Iggy; Youngbae	Iggy; Youngbae	3:20
Total length:					32:23

== Charts ==
Chart (2017)	Peak position
Japan (Oricon)	105
South Korea (Gaon)	3
Taiwanese Albums (Five Music)	1
US World Albums (Billboard)	10

== Sales ==
Region	Sales
South Korea (Gaon)	61,472+
Japan (Oricon)	1,269+

== Awards and nominations ==
=== Music program awards ===
Song	Program	Date
"Love Whisper"	The Show (SBS MTV)	August 8, 2017
"Love Whisper"	Show Champion (MBC Music)	August 9, 2017
"Love Whisper"	Music Bank (KBS)	August 11, 2017
"Love Whisper"	Inkigayo (SBS)	August 13, 2017
"Summer Rain"	The Show (SBS MTV)	September 19, 2017
"Summer Rain"	M Countdown (Mnet)	September 21, 2017
