= Time for Us =

- Digital and Daybreak version cover

Studio album by GFriend
- Released: January 14, 2019
- Recorded: 2017–2019
- Genre: K-pop; hip hop; R&B; tropical house; pop rock; ballad
- Length: 46:22
- Label: Source; Kakao M

GFriend chronology
Sunny Summer (2018)	Time for Us (2019)	Fever Season (2019)

Singles from Time for Us
- 1. "Sunrise" Released: January 14, 2019

Time for Us is the second studio album by South Korean girl group GFriend. It was released by Source Music on January 14, 2019, distributed by kakao M. The album contains thirteen songs, including the lead single "Sunrise" and its instrumental version, along with a Korean version of the group's first Japanese single "Memoria".

== Release and promotion ==
Time for Us is GFriend's second studio album, released two years and six months after their first studio album, LOL. Time for Us was released on January 14, 2019, in three versions: "Daybreak", "Daytime" and "Midnight". Following this, a limited version of the album was then released on January 25, 2019. GFriend started their promotions with Mnet's M Countdown on January 17, 2019, where they performed "Sunrise" and "Memoria (Korean ver.)". On January 19, 2019, they performed their side track "A Starry Sky" on MBC's Show! Music Core as part of their comeback stage. During the second week of promotions, GFriend took first place on all music shows, making them the first artist in 2019 to achieve a "grand slam".

== Track listing ==
No.	Title	Lyrics	Music	Arrangement	Length
1.	"Sunrise" (Korean: 해야; RR: Haeya)	No Joo-hwan	No Joo-hwan; Lee Won-jong	No Joo-hwan; Lee Won-jong	3:36
2.	"You Are Not Alone"	Iggy; Youngbae	Iggy; Youngbae	Iggy; Youngbae	3:33
3.	"L.U.V" (기적을 넘어; Gijeogeul neomeo, lit. "Surpassing Miracle")	Lee Seu-ran	Darren Smith; Sean Alexander	Darren Smith; Avenue 52	3:15
4.	"Glow" (만화경; Manhwagyeong, lit. "Comic Book")	Lee Mi-so	Daniel Sherman; Val De Prete; Caroline Gustavsson	Daniel Shermann	3:43
5.	"Our Secret" (비밀 이야기; Bimil iyagi, lit. "Secret Story")	Lee Seu-ran	B.Eyes	B.Eyes	3:25
6.	"Only 1"	Iggy; Youngbae	Iggy; Youngbae	Minki	3:10
7.	"Truly Love"	Limgo; Kim Woong	Kim Woong	Kim Woong	3:39
8.	"Show Up" (보호색; Bohosaek, lit. "Protective Color")	No Joo-hwan	No Joo-hwan; Lee Won-jong	Lee Won-jong	3:30
9.	"It's You" (겨울, 끝; Gyeoul kkeut; lit. "Winter, End")	Miyao, Jade, Kim Ah-reum	Spacecowboy	Spacecowboy	4:01
10.	"A Starry Sky"	Son Go-eun	Son Go-eun	Son Go-eun	3:11
11.	"Love Oh Love"	Jerry; Emotional Vending Machine	Megatone; stereo14	Megatone; stereo14	3:21
12.	"Memoria" (Korean ver.)	No Joo-hwan	Carlos K.; Joe	Carlos K.; Ryo Miyata	4:09
13.	"Sunrise" (Instrumental)		No Joo-hwan; Lee Won-jong	No Joo-hwan; Lee Won-jong	3:36
Total length:					46:22

== Personnel ==
Credits adapted from album liner notes.

Locations

- Recorded at VIBE Studio (all tracks)
- Recorded at Seoul Studio (tracks 1, 13)
- Mixed at KoKo Sound Studio (tracks 1, 7, 13)
- Mixed at Cube Studio (track 2)
- Mixed at J's Atelier Studio (tracks 3–4, 8, 12)
- Mixed at Mapps Studio (tracks 5–6)
- Mixed at W Sound (track 9)
- Mixed at LAFX Studios (track 10)
- Mixed at 821 Sound (track 11)
- Mastered at 821 Sound Mastering (all tracks)

Personnel

- Kim Ba-ro – string arrangement (tracks 1, 13)
- Kim Ye-il – bass guitar (tracks 1, 13)
- Lee Won-jong – programming (tracks 1, 8, 13), piano, keyboard (track 8)
- No Joo-hwan – piano, keyboard, programming (tracks 1, 13)
- Jung Dong-yoon – drum (tracks 1, 13)
- Ryu Hyeon-woo – guitar (tracks 1, 8, 13)
- Kwon Nam-woo – mastering (all tracks)
- Go Hyeon-jung – mixing (tracks 1, 7, 13)
- Yoong String – strings (tracks 1, 13)
- Seo Yong-bae – drum programming (track 2)
- Iggy – guitar, synth (track 2)
- Young – guitar (tracks 2, 6)
- Jeon Bu-yeon – mixing assistant (track 2)
- Jo-ssi Ajeossi – mixing (track 2)
- Darren Smith – keyboard, programming (track 3)
- Sean Michael Alexander – keyboard, programming (track 3)
- Jeong-jin – mixing (tracks 3–4, 8, 12)
- Ko Myung-jae – guitar (track 5)
- Kim Seok-min – mixing (tracks 5–6)
- B.Eyes – piano, keyboard, electric piano, bass, drum, synth (track 5)
- Minki – piano, bass (track 6)
- Kim Woong – piano, drum, bass, synth (track 7)
- Choi Young-joon – string arrangement (track 9)
- Lee Tae-wook – guitar (tracks 9, 11)
- Jo Joon-sung – mixing (track 9)
- Spacecowboy – piano, keyboard, electric piano, bass, drum, synth, programming (track 9)
- Kim Dong-min – guitar (track 10)
- Son Go-eun – keyboard (track 10)
- Alan Foster – mixing (track 10)
- Kim Jin-hee – keyboard, drum (track 11)
- Master Key – mixing (track 11)
- Kim Byeong-seok – piano, bass (track 11)
- Miz – strings, string arrangement (track 12)
- Ryo Miyata – string arrangement, piano, keyboard, bass, programming (track 12)
- Carlos K. – keyboard, electric piano, bass, drum, drum programming, synth, programming (track 12)
- Toshi-Fj – guitar (track 12)
- Joe – keyboard, synth (track 12)

== Charts ==
=== Weekly charts ===
Chart (2019)	Peak position
Japan (Oricon)	55
South Korean Albums (Gaon)	2
US World Albums (Billboard)	12

=== Year-end charts ===
Chart (2019)	Position
South Korean Albums (Gaon)	63

== Sales ==
Region	Sales
South Korea (Gaon)	91,099+
Japan (Oricon)	1,457+

== See also ==
- Time for Us at Discogs (list of releases)
