= Sunny Summer =

- Digital and Sunny version cover

EP by GFriend
- Released: July 19, 2018
- Genre: K-pop; synthpop; soul; Kawaii future bass
- Length: 16:51
- Label: Source Music; kakao M

GFriend chronology
Kyō Kara Watashitachi wa: GFriend 1st Best (2018)	Sunny Summer (2018)	Time for Us (2019)

Singles from Sunny Summer
- 1. "Sunny Summer" Released: July 19, 2018

Sunny Summer is a special extended play (EP) by South Korean girl group GFriend. The album is marketed as their first special "summer" EP. It was released by Source Music on July 19, 2018, and distributed by kakao M (formerly LOEN Entertainment).

== Composition ==
The album contains five songs, including the eponymous title track, "Sunny Summer," described by Billboard as having "airy, exuberant vocals that bounce along over the melody, [the song] is driven by the group's refreshing vocals tones as they sing about having a memorable summer together."

== Track listing ==
No.	Title	Lyrics	Music	Arrangement	Length
1.	"Sunny Summer" (Korean: 여름여름해; RR: Yeoreumyeoreumhae)	Duble Sidekick; Black Edition	Duble Sidekick; Black Edition	Duble Sidekick	3:18
2.	"Vacation"	Iggy; Youngbae	Iggy; Youngbae	Iggy; Youngbae	3:24
3.	"Sweety"	Mio	Mio, Dylan Tallchief	Mio, Dylan Tallchief	3:13
4.	"Windy Windy" (바람 바람 바람; Baram Baram Baram)	Boombastic	Boombastic	Boombastic	3:16
5.	"Love in the Air"	No Joo-hwan	Andreas Öberg; Darren Smith; Sean Alexander; No Joo-hwan	Andreas Öberg; Darren Smith; Avenue 52; No Joo-hwan	3:40
Total length:					16:51

== Charts ==
=== Weekly charts ===
Chart (2018)	Peak position
Japan (Oricon)	112
South Korean Albums (Gaon)	2
Taiwanese Albums (Five Music)	1
US World Albums (Billboard)	13

=== Year-end charts ===
Chart	Peak position
South Korean Albums (Gaon)	79

== Sales ==
Region	Sales
South Korea (Gaon)	54,913+
Japan (Oricon)	1,159+
