= Time for the Moon Night =

- Digital and Time version cover

EP by GFriend
- Released: April 30, 2018
- Recorded: 2018
- Genre: K-pop; ballad; dream pop
- Length: 26:50
- Label: Source; kakao M

GFriend chronology
Parallel (2017)	Time for the Moon Night (2018)	Kyō Kara Watashitachi wa: GFriend 1st Best (2018)

Singles from Time for the Moon Night
- 1. "Time for the Moon Night" Released: April 30, 2018

Time for the Moon Night is the sixth extended play (EP) by South Korean girl group GFriend. It was released by Source Music on April 30, 2018. The album contains six songs, including the single of the same name, and two instrumental tracks.

"Time for the Moon Night", written by No Joo-hwan and Lee Won-jong, is GFriend's first single not written by producer duo Iggy and Youngbae.

== Composition ==
Time for the Moon Night is more sentimental and dreamlike compared to GFriend's previous albums. According to member Umji, the group wanted to "set a new direction toward producing thought-provoking and sentimental music". The album's single, "Time for the Moon Night", has a retro sound reminiscent of Japanese anime soundtracks.

"Love Bug" is an upbeat song with a retro jazz sound, "Flower Garden" is retro synth-pop, and "Tik Tik" has a funky sound with Nu-disco beat. "Bye" is a pop ballad and "You Are My Star" is a sentimental song for GFriend's fans.

== Release and promotions ==
After a seven-month break since the sextet's reissue EP Rainbow, GFriend officially returned with Time for the Moon Night on April 30, 2018. They released three versions of the album named "Time Version", "Moon Version" and "Night Version". On the album's release date, GFriend held a comeback showcase titled Moon Light: Express 241 at Yes24 Live Hall in Gwangjin-gu. The group performed the lead single, "Time for the Moon Night" and the album track "Love Bug" at the media showcase, which was simultaneously broadcast live via Naver's V-Live app.

GFriend started promoting the album with performances of "Time for the Moon Night" and "Love Bug" on M Countdown on May 3, 2018, preceding live stages on various music shows throughout the entire week. In their second week of promotion, the song won first place on every music show with a chart system, making GFriend the first and only artist to achieve a "grand slam" in 2018. GFriend ended their promotions on May 20, garnering a total of 10 trophies from all six music programs. It became the third among the group's lead singles with most number of wins, only behind "Rough" and "Navillera".

== Track listing ==
No.	Title	Lyrics	Music	Arrangement	Length
1.	"Intro (Daytime)"		No Joo-hwan	No Joo-hwan; Kim Ba-ro	1:00
2.	"Time for the Moon Night" (Korean: 밤; RR: Bam; lit. 'Night')	No Joo-hwan	No Joo-hwan; Lee Won-jong	No Joo-hwan; Lee Won-jong	3:46
3.	"Love Bug"	Seo Ji-eum	David Amber; Andy Love; Ryan S. Jhun		3:42
4.	"Flower Garden" (휘리휘리; Hwirihwiri; 'Whirl')	Mio	Mio	Mio	3:15
5.	"Tik Tik" (틱틱)	Iggy; Youngbae	Iggy; Youngbae	Iggy; Youngbae	2:59
6.	"Bye"	No Joo-hwan	No Joo-hwan; Kim Ye-il; Sophia Pae	No Joo-hwan	4:54
7.	"You Are My Star" (별; Byeol; 'Star')	Lee Shin-seong	ZigZag Note	ZigZag Note	3:15
8.	"Time for the Moon Night" (Instrumental)		No Joo-hwan; Lee Won-jong	No Joo-hwan; Lee Won-jong	3:47
Total length:					26:50

== Personnel ==
Locations

- Recorded at VIBE Studio (tracks 1–2, 4–7)
- Recorded at In Grid Studio (track 3)
- Recorded at Velvet Studio (tracks 1–2, 4, 6, 8)
- Recorded at T Studio (tracks 2, 8)
- Mixed at KoKo Sound Studio
- Mixed at In Grid Studio
- Mixed at Cube Studio
- Mixed at J's Atelier Studio
- Mixed at W Sound
- Mixed at Antenna Studio
- Mastered at 821 Sound Mastering

Vocal credits

- Yoon Bit-nara - backing vocals (track 2)
- Lee Dan-bi - backing vocals (track 2)
- Lee Won-jong - backing vocals (track 2)
- Yuju - backing vocals (track 3)
- Kim So-ri - backing vocals (tracks 4–5, 7)
- Lee Ji-won - backing vocals (track 4)
- Sophia Pae - backing vocals (track 6)

Technical credits (not including songwriting and producer credits shown in the track listing above)

- Kim Ba-ro - arrangement (track 1), string arrangement (tracks 1–2, 8)
- No Ju-hwan - programming (tracks 1–2, 8), piano (tracks 2, 6, 8), keyboard (track 1), arrangement (tracks 1, 6)
- Ryu Hyeon-woo - guitar (tracks 1–2, 5–8)
- Jeong-jin - mixing (track 1)
- Lee Sang-deok - recording (tracks 1–2, 4, 6, 8)
- Kwak Jeong-shin - recording (tracks 1–2, 4–7)
- Jung Mo-yeon - recording (tracks 4–7), recording assistant (tracks 1–2), digital editing (track 3)
- Yoong String - strings (tracks 1–2, 4, 6, 8)
- Kim Ye-il - bass guitar (tracks 2, 4, 6, 8), arrangement (track 6)
- Lee Won-jong - programming (tracks 2, 8)
- Jung Dong-yoon - drum (tracks 2, 8)
- Go Hyeon-jung - mixing (tracks 2, 8)
- Kim Joon-sang - mixing assistant (tracks 2, 8)
- Jun Jin - mixing assistant (tracks 2, 8)
- Jung Gi-woon - mixing assistant (tracks 2, 8)
- Oh Sung-geun - recording (tracks 2, 8)
- Baek Kyung-hoon - recording assistant (tracks 2, 8)
- Ryan S. Jhun - vocal director (track 3)
- Jung Eun-kyung - recording, mixing (track 3)
- Woo Min-jung - recording assistant (track 3)
- Kwon Seok-hong - string arrangement (track 4)
- Young - guitar (track 4)
- Jo-ssi Ajeossi - mixing (tracks 4–5, 7)
- Seo Yong-bae - drum programming (track 5, 7)
- Iggy - piano, keyboard (track 5, 7)
- Sin Min - string arrangement (track 6)
- Ha Hyung-joo - drum (track 6)
- Ji Seung-nam - mixing (track 6)

== Charts ==
=== Weekly charts ===
Chart (2018)	Peak position
Japan (Oricon)	63
South Korean Albums (Gaon)	1
US World Albums (Billboard)	6

=== Year-end charts ===
Chart	Peak position
South Korean Albums (Gaon)	55

== Sales ==
Region	Sales
South Korea (Gaon)	84,313+
Japan (Oricon)	1,170+

== See also ==
- Time for the Moon Night at Discogs (list of releases)
