= The Awakening (EP) =

- Digital and Knight version cover

EP by GFriend
- Released: March 6, 2017
- Genre: K-pop; dance pop; funk
- Length: 20:42
- Label: Source Music; LOEN Entertainment

GFriend chronology
LOL (2016)	The Awakening (2017)	Parallel (2017)

Singles from The Awakening
- 1. "Fingertip" Released: March 6, 2017

The Awakening is the fourth extended play (EP) by South Korean girl group GFriend. The EP was released digitally and physically by Source Music on March 6, 2017 and distributed by LOEN Entertainment. The album consists of six songs, including the single "Fingertip".

The EP peaked atop the Gaon Album Chart and at number 5 on US World Albums. The EP has sold over 70,000 physical copies as of April 2017.

== Commercial performance ==
The Awakening debuted and peaked atop the Gaon Album Chart, on the chart issue dated March 5–11, 2017. The EP placed at number 5 on the chart for the month of March 2017, with 64,802 physical copies sold. The EP has sold over 73,492 physical copies as of April 2017. The EP also debuted at number 5 on the US World Albums chart, as the highest ranking debut of the week ending March 25, 2017.

Four songs from the EP entered the Gaon Digital Chart in its first week: "Fingertip" at number 2, "Hear the Wind Sing" at number 34, "Rain in the Spring Time" at number 94 and "Please Save My Earth" at number 99.

== Track listing ==
No.	Title	Lyrics	Music	Arrangement	Length
1.	"Hear the Wind Sing" (바람의 노래; Baramui Norae)	Megatone; Ferdy	Megatone; Ferdy	Megatone; Ferdy	3:35
2.	"Fingertip"	Iggy; Youngbae	Iggy; Youngbae	Iggy; Youngbae	3:30
3.	"Contrail" (비행운:飛行雲; Bihaengun)	Mafly; Keyfly	Brian Choi; 220; Erik Lidbom	Brian Choi; 220	3:36
4.	"Please Save My Earth" (나의 지구를 지켜줘; Naui Jigureul Jikyeojwo)	MIO	MIO	MIO	3:11
5.	"Rain In the Spring Time" (봄비; Bombi)	Mafly Keyfly	Erik Lidbom; Sophia Pae; 220	Erik Lidbom	3:28
6.	"Crush" (핑; Ping)	e.one	e.one	e.one	3:22
Total length:					20:42

== Charts ==
Chart (2017)	Peak position
Japanese Albums (Oricon)	18
South Korean Albums (Gaon)	1
Taiwanese Albums (Five Music)	2
US World Albums (Billboard)	5
