= Summer Rain (GFriend song) =

Single by GFriend

from the EP Rainbow
- Released: September 13, 2017
- Genre: K-pop, baroque pop, hip hop
- Length: 3:52
- Label: Source; LOEN
- Songwriters: Iggy; Youngbae
- Producers: Iggy; Youngbae

GFriend singles chronology
| "Love Whisper" (2017) | "Summer Rain" (2017) | "Time for the Moon Night" (2018) |

Music video
- "Summer Rain" on YouTube

"Summer Rain" (Korean: 여름비; RR: Yeoreumbi) is a song recorded by South Korean girl group GFriend for Rainbow, the reissue of their fifth extended play Parallel (2017). The song was released by Source Music on September 13, 2017, as the reissue title track.

== Composition ==
"Summer Rain"
18-second sample of "Summer Rain", showing a sample of Schumann's "Dichterliebe Op. 48 Mvt. 1".

The song was described by Billboard's Tamar Herman, as "one of their [GFriend] most mellow songs to date", that "blends new jack swing with the K-pop girl group's representative twinkling synths to create a throwback track fit for the season". It was noted that the song samples instrumentals from Robert Schumann's "Dichterliebe Op. 48 Mvt. 1", interlacing them with propulsive beats.

== Chart performance ==
The song debuted and peaked at number 11 on the Gaon Digital Chart, on the chart issue dated September 10–16, 2017, with 72,272 downloads sold and 1,175,887 streams. In its second week, the song fell to number 26 and to number 41 in its third week. It also debuted at number 30 on Billboard Korea's Kpop Hot 100. In its second week, the song peaked at number 21.

The song debuted at number 36 on the chart for the month of September 2017, with 154,431 downloads sold and 4,324,847 streams.

== Music video ==
A music video for the song was released on September 13, 2017. The video features the members of the group in pouring rain scenes, intercalated with dance scenes. Billboard noted that the video's costumes "returns GFriend to a softer, more flirty school uniform look that offers up a maturing of some of their earlier style choices."

== Live performances ==
The group held their first comeback stage on Mnet's M Countdown on September 14, 2017. They continued on KBS2's Music Bank on September 15.

== Accolades ==
Music program awards
| Program | Date | Ref. |
|---|---|---|
| The Show | September 19, 2017 | |
| M Countdown | September 21, 2017 | |

== Charts ==
| Chart (2017) | Peak position |
|---|---|
| South Korea (Gaon Digital Chart) | 11 |
| South Korea (Kpop Hot 100) | 21 |
