= Flower (GFriend song) =

2019 single by GFriend

- Digital and Type A edition cover

Single by GFriend

from the album Fallin' Light
- B-side: "Beautiful"
- Released: March 12, 2019
- Genre: J-pop, dance pop, tango
- Label: King

GFriend singles chronology
"Sunrise" (2019)	"Flower" (2019)	"Oh Difficult" (2019)

Music video
- "Flower" on YouTube

"Flower" is a song recorded by South Korean girl group GFriend. It was released by King Records on March 12, 2019, as their fourth Japanese single. It was later included in their debut Japanese studio album Fallin' Light (2019).

== Release ==
It was released as a digital EP on March 12, 2019. A day later, it was released in three physical editions: CD, CD+DVD Type A and CD+Photobook Type B.

== Promotion ==
GFriend performed the song for the first time at their concert in Zepp Osaka Bayside, as part of their GFriend Spring Tour 2019 Bloom. It was also revealed that the song was chosen as the opening theme for the TV program music-ru TV for the month of March.

== Music video ==
The music video was released on March 4, 2019. In the video, the group are dressed as bullfighters and performs a dance inspired by tango.

== Commercial performance ==
"Flower" debuted and peaked at number 9 on the Oricon Singles Chart for the week ending March 25, 2019. The song also picked at number 35 on Billboard's Japan Hot 100.

== Track listing ==
CD/Digital download
No.	Title	Lyrics	Music	Arrangement	Length
1.	"Flower"	13	13	13	3:39
2.	"Beautiful"	Kanata Okajima	Carlos K.; Taku Goto	Carlos K.	3:37
3.	"Flower" (Instrumental)		13	13	3:39
4.	"Beautiful" (Instrumental)		Carlos K.; Taku Goto	Carlos K.	3:36
Total length:					14:31

DVD Type A
No.	Title	Length
1.	"Flower" (Music video)
2.	"Flower" (MV Making movie)
Total length:		23:31

== Charts ==
Chart (2019)	Peak position
Japan (Oricon)	9
Japan (Japan Hot 100)	35
