= Fallin' Light =

- Digital and Limited edition cover

Studio album by GFriend
- Released: November 13, 2019
- Recorded: 2016–2019
- Genre: J-pop
- Length: 39:47
- Label: King

GFriend chronology
Fever Season (2019)	Fallin' Light (2019)	Labyrinth (2020)

Singles from Fallin' Light
- 1. "Memoria/夜 (Time for the Moon Night)" Released: October 10, 2018; 2. "Sunrise/La pam pam" Released: February 13, 2019; 3. "Flower/Beautiful" Released: March 12, 2019; 4. "Fallin' Light" Released: October 30, 2019

Fallin' Light is the first Japanese-language studio album (third overall) by South Korean girl group GFriend. It was released in Japan by King Records on November 13, 2019, as the group's second Japanese album. It peaked at number 7 on the Oricon Albums Chart. A music video was released for the lead single "Fallin' Light (Tenshi no Hashigo)".

== Track listing ==
No.	Title	Lyrics	Music	Arrangement	Length
1.	"Fallin' Light (Tenshi no Hashigo)" (Fallin' Light (天使の梯子))	Iggy, SYB	Iggy, SYB, Carlos K.	Iggy, SYB, Carlos K.	3:41
2.	"Emotional Days"	Carlos K.	Carlos K.	Carlos K.	3:13
3.	"Memoria"	Carlos K.	Carlos K., Joe	Carlos K., Ryo 'Lefty' Miyata	4:10
4.	"Koi no Hajimari" (恋の始まり; transl. The Beginning of Love)	Noh Joo-hwan	Noh Joo-hwan, Lee Won-jong, Kim Jung-woo	Noh Joo-hwan, Kim Jung-woo	3:21
5.	"Flower"	13	13	13	3:38
6.	"My My My!"	Jang Jung-woo (of MI.O)	Jang Jung-woo (of MI.O)	Jang Jung-woo (of MI.O)	3:20
7.	"Yoru (Time for the Moon Night)" (夜 (Time for the Moon Night); Japanese version)	Noh Joo-hwan, Funk Uchino	Noh Joo-hwan, Lee Won-jong	Noh Joo-hwan, Lee Won-jong	3:49
8.	"Sunrise" (Japanese version)	Noh Joo-hwan, Anan	Noh Joo-hwan, Lee Won-jong	Noh Joo-hwan, Lee Won-jong	3:41
9.	"La Pam Pam"	Jang Jung-woo (of MI.O)	Jang Jung-woo (of MI.O)	Jang Jung-woo (of MI.O)	3:37
10.	"Beautiful"	Kanata Okajima	Carlos K., Taku Goto	Carlos K.	3:37
11.	"My Buddy" (Japanese version) (CD edition bonus track)	Heuktae, Funk Uchino, Grace	Heuktae, Kwon Hyuk-ho	Heuktae	3:34
Total length:					39:47

== Charts ==
Chart (2019)	Peak position
Japanese Albums (Oricon)	7
