= Love Whisper =

2017 single by GFriend

Single by GFriend

from the EP Parallel
- Released: August 1, 2017
- Genre: K-pop; new jack swing
- Length: 3:32
- Label: Source; LOEN
- Songwriters: Iggy; Youngbae
- Producers: Iggy; Youngbae

GFriend singles chronology
"Fingertip" (2017)	"Love Whisper" (2017)	"Summer Rain" (2017)

Music video
- "Love Whisper" on YouTube

"Love Whisper" (Korean: 귀를 기울이면; RR: Gwireul Giurimyeon; Lit.: "If you listen carefully") is a song recorded by South Korean girl group GFriend for their fifth extended play Parallel (2017). The song was released by Source Music on August 1, 2017, as the EP title track. It has sold over 471,879 downloads as of September 2017.

== Composition ==
The song was described by Billboard's Tamar Herman, as a "midtempo pop song" that incorporates a variety of playful sound effects, from birds chirping, brassy horns, twinkling chimes, water droplets, and even a guitar solo.

== Chart performance ==
The song debuted at number 2 on the Gaon Digital Chart, on the chart issue dated July 30 – August 5, 2017, with 158,284 downloads – topping the Download Chart – and 3,198,664 streams. It has sold over 471,879 downloads as of September 2017.

It also debuted at number 13 on Billboard's Korea K-pop Hot 100.

== Music video ==
The music video was released on August 1 and passed seven million views on its first day.

== Live performances ==
GFriend held their first performance of "Love Whisper" on MBC Music's Show Champion on August 2, 2017. They continued on Mnet's M Countdown on August 3, KBS's Music Bank on August 4, MBC's Show! Music Core on August 5, and SBS's Inkigayo on August 6.

== Accolades ==
Music program awards
Program	Date	Ref.
The Show	August 8, 2017	
Show Champion	August 9, 2017	
Music Bank	August 11, 2017	
Inkigayo	August 13, 2017	

== Charts ==
Chart (2017)	Peak position
South Korea (Gaon Digital Chart)	2
South Korea (K-pop Hot 100)	13
