= Fingertip (song) =

2017 single by GFriend

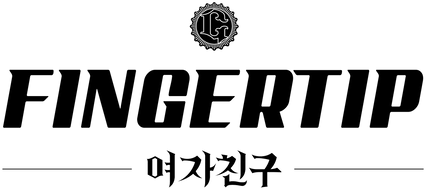

Single by GFriend

from the EP The Awakening
- Released: March 6, 2017
- Genre: K-pop, synth-pop, disco, funk
- Length: 3:30
- Label: Source; LOEN
- Songwriters: Iggy; Youngbae
- Producers: Iggy; Youngbae

GFriend singles chronology
"Navillera" (2016)	"Fingertip" (2017)	"Love Whisper" (2017)

Music video
- "Fingertip" on YouTube

"Fingertip" is a song recorded by South Korean girl group GFriend for their fourth extended play The Awakening (2017). The song was released by Source Music on March 6, 2017, as the EP title track.

== Composition ==
The song was described by Billboard's Tamar Herman as "funk-driven" with a "more energetic sound than their early hits", containing "electric guitar and bass", emphasizing the group's vocals.

== Chart performance ==
The song debuted and peaked at number 2 on the Gaon Digital Chart, on the chart issue dated March 5–11, 2017, with 151,181 downloads – topping the Download Chart – and 2,946,049 streams. The song placed at number 6 on the chart for the month of March 2017 with 307,267 downloads sold and 10,990,137 streams accumulated. The song has sold over 530,652 downloads as of May 2017. It also debuted at number 95 on Billboard Korea's K-pop Hot 100.

== Music videos ==
The first music video teaser was released on March 1, 2017. The official music video was released on March 6. A day later, a behind the scenes video was released through the group's official YouTube channel. Two choreography videos were released: "A" version on March 8 and "B" version on March 12.

== Accolades ==
Music program award
Program	Date
SBS M's The Show	March 14, 2017
SBS M's The Show	April 11, 2017

== Charts ==
Chart (2017)	Peak position
South Korea (Gaon Digital Chart)	2
South Korea (K-pop Hot 100)	95
