= Sunrise (GFriend song) =

2019 single by GFriend

- Japanese version cover (digital and edition Type A)

Single by GFriend

from the album Time for Us and Fallin' Light
- B-side: "La pam pam"
- Released: January 14, 2019; February 13, 2019 (Japanese version)
- Genre: K-pop; J-pop
- Label: Source; kakao M; King
- Composers: Noh Joo-hwan; Lee Won-jong
- Lyricist: Noh Joo-hwan

GFriend singles chronology
"Memoria" (2018)	"Sunrise" (2019)	"Flower" (2019)

Music videos
- "Sunrise" on YouTube
- "Sunrise JP ver." on YouTube

"Sunrise" (Korean: 해야; RR: Haeya) is a song recorded by South Korean girl group GFriend for their second studio album Time for Us (2019). It was also released as the group's third Japanese single and was later included in their debut Japanese studio album Fallin' Light (2019).

== Composition ==
The song was written by Noh Joo-hwan who also produced the song alongside Lee Won-jong.

== Release ==
Two teasers were released on January 5, 2019, and January 12, 2019, respectively.

The song was released on January 14, 2019, in conjunction with their second studio album.

=== Japanese version ===
The song was released in Japan as their second single on February 13, 2019. It was released as a digital EP and in three physical editions: CD, CD+DVD Type A and CD+Photobook Type B.

== Commercial performance ==
"Sunrise" debuted and peaked at number 12 on the Gaon Digital Chart for the week ending January 19, 2019.

The song was placed at number 9 for the month of January 2019. The song also placed at 31 in February 2019. at number 94 in March 2019. It also charted at number 145 for 2019.

=== Japan ===
The single debuted and peaked at number 11 on the Oricon Singles Chart for the week ending February 25, 2019.

== Track listing ==
CD/Digital download
No.	Title	Lyrics	Music	Arrangement	Length
1.	"Sunrise" (Japanese version)	Noh Joo-hwan; anan	Noh Joo-hwan; Lee Won-jong	Noh Joo-hwan	3:41
2.	"La pam pam"	Jang jung-woo (MI.O); momoko	Jang jung-woo (MI.O)	Jang jung-woo (MI.O)	3:38
3.	"Sunrise" (Japanese version - Instrumental)		Noh Joo-hwan; Lee Won-jong		3:41
4.	"La pam pam" (Instrumental)		Jang jung-woo (MI.O)		3:37
Total length:					14:37

Type A DVD
No.	Title	Length
1.	"Sunrise" (JP ver. - Music video)
2.	"Sunrise" (JP ver. - MV Making movie)
Total length:		25:39

== Accolades ==
Music program awards
Program	Date	Ref.
The Show	January 22, 2019	
Show Champion	January 23, 2019	
M Countdown	January 24, 2019	
Music Bank	January 25, 2019	
Show! Music Core	January 26, 2019	
Inkigayo	January 27, 2019	

== Charts ==
=== Weekly charts ===
Chart (2019)	Peak position
Japan (Oricon)	11
Japan (Japan Hot 100)	50
South Korea (Gaon)	12
South Korea (K-pop Hot 100)	10
US World Digital Song Sales (Billboard)	25

=== Year-end charts ===
Chart (2019)	Position
South Korea (Gaon)	149

== See also ==
- List of M Countdown Chart winners (2019)
