= Memoria (GFriend song) =

2018 single by GFriend

"Memoria / 夜 (Time for the Moon Night)"
- Digital and Type A edition cover

Single by GFriend

from the album Fallin' Light
- B-side: "夜 (Time for the Moon Night)"
- Released: October 10, 2018
- Genre: J-pop; dance
- Length: 15:56
- Label: King
- Songwriter(s): Carlos K.
- Producer(s): Carlos K.; JOE

GFriend singles chronology
"Sunny Summer" (2018)	"Memoria" / "夜 (Time for the Moon Night)" (2018)	"Sunrise" (2019)

Music video
- "Memoria" on YouTube

"Memoria" is a song recorded by South Korean girl group GFriend. It was released by King Records on October 10, 2018, as the group's second Japanese single.

== Composition ==
The song was described by Billboard's Tamar Herman, as an "effervescent dance track", that "returns [GFriend] to the sweet synth-pop style they favored on early releases". Adding that "the track leads with plinking synths and gentle instrumentals before building into a majestic, tempo-shifting choral climax introduced by bright strings and graceful harmonies as the six women let their vocals soar".

== Release ==
The single was released in three editions: Regular, Limited Type A and Limited Type B. It was also released as a digital EP.

== Commercial performance ==
The single debuted at number 5 on the Oricon Singles Chart in its first day and peaked at number 2 in its third day with 1,704 copies sold.

Memoria debuted at number 6 on the Oricon Singles chart in its first week, with 16,602 physical copies sold. The song also debuted at number 13 on Billboard Japan Hot 100, placing at number 5 on Top Singles Sales, for 16,880 estimated sales.

The single was 31st best-selling single for October 2018 with 17,593 copies sold.

== Music video ==
A music video for "Memoria" was released on September 19, 2018. The video features the group as they dream away their days, before waking up in a slightly changed world full of glitter, art, angels, and more before they all come together atop of a roof. For the choreography scenes, the members don a variety of tartan-patterned dresses as they perform the sweeping, ballet-inspired routine.

== Track listing ==
CD / Digital EP
No.	Title	Lyrics	Music	Arrangement	Length
1.	"Memoria"	Carlos K.	Carlos K.; JOE	Carlos K.; Ryo ‘Lefty’ Miyata	4:10
2.	"Time for the Moon Night" (夜; Japanese version)	Noh Joo-hwan; Lee Won-jong	Noh Joo-hwan; Lee Won-jong	Noh Joo-hwan; Lee Won-jong	3:49
3.	"Memoria" (Instrumental)		Carlos K.; JOE	Carlos K.; Ryo ‘Lefty’ Miyata	4:09
4.	"Time for the Moon Night" (Japanese version; Instrumental)		Noh Joo-hwan; Lee Won-jong	Noh Joo-hwan; Lee Won-jong	3:48
Total length:					15:56

Limited Edition Type A (DVD)
No.	Title	Length
1.	"Memoria" (Music Video)
2.	"Memoria" (MV Making Video)

== Charts ==
Chart (2018)	Peak position
Japan (Oricon)	6
Japan (Japan Hot 100)	13
