= Time for the Moon Night (song) =

2018 single by GFriend

- Cover of Japanese double A-side with "Memoria" (regular edition)

Single by GFriend

from the EP Time for the Moon Night
- Language: Korean
- A-side: "Memoria"
- Released: April 30, 2018
- Genre: K-pop
- Length: 3:46
- Label: Source; kakao M
- Songwriters: Noh Joo-hwan; Lee Won-jong
- Producers: Noh Joo-hwan; Lee Won-jong

GFriend singles chronology
| "Summer Rain" (2017) | "Time for the Moon Night" (2018) | "Sunny Summer" (2018) |

Music video
- "Time for the Moon Night" on YouTube

"Time for the Moon Night" (Korean: 밤; RR: Bam; lit. 'Night') is a song recorded by South Korean girl group GFriend for their sixth extended play of the same name. The song was released by Source Music on April 30, 2018. It is the first and only song to achieve a "grand slam" in 2018, winning all of the six music program trophies consecutively in one week.

The song was written by No Joo-hwan and Lee Won-jong and is GFriend's first single not written by producer duo Iggy and Youngbae.

== Composition ==
The single has a retro sound reminiscent of Japanese anime soundtracks. Kwak Yeon-soo of The Korea Times described it as a "whimsical dance song with a lyrical melody and dynamic tempo" which "offers introspective lyrics and honest storytelling". Tamar Harman of Billboard described it as "a song that is sprinkled with retro-inspired digital quirks, fluttering synths, and layered harmonies as the members of GFriend sing their way between dynamic tempo and tonal shifts".

== Chart performance ==
The song debuted at number 9 on the Gaon Digital Chart, on the chart issue dated April 29 – May 5, 2018, and later peaked at number 2 in its third week. The song debuted at number 3 on the chart for the month of May 2018, and was included in the half-year chart at number 49. It also debuted at number 6 on Billboard Korea's Kpop Hot 100, peaking at number 3 in its third week.

== Music video and live performances ==
A music video for the song was released on April 30, 2018. The song's music video shifts the group away from the uniform-inspired, synchronized looks of their previous conceptual eras, and instead individualizes each of the six members. The music video was directed by Eddie Yoo-jeong Ko of Lumpens.

The group held their first comeback stage on Mnet's M Countdown on May 3, 2018, and ended their promotions on SBS's Inkigayo on May 20.

== Accolades ==
"Time for the Moon Night" won first place on every music show with a chart system, making GFriend the first and only artist to achieve a "grand slam" in 2018. The song garnered a total of 10 trophies from all six music programs, becoming the third among the group's lead singles with most number of wins, only behind "Rough" and "Navillera".

Awards and nominations
| Year | Organization | Category | Results | Ref. |
|---|---|---|---|---|
| 2018 | Melon Music Awards | Best Music Video | Won | |
| 2018 | Melon Music Awards | Song of the Year | Nominated | |
| 2019 | Gaon Chart Music Awards | Performer of the Year (Instrumentals) | Won | |
| 2019 | Gaon Chart Music Awards | Song of the Year – April | Nominated | |
| 2019 | Golden Disk Awards | Digital Bonsang | Nominated | |
| 2019 | Seoul Music Awards | Best Dance Performance | Won | |

Music program awards
| Program | Date | Ref. |
|---|---|---|
| The Show | May 8, 2018 | |
| Show Champion | May 9, 2018 | |
| Show Champion | May 16, 2018 | |
| M Countdown | May 10, 2018 | |
| Music Bank | May 11, 2018 | |
| Music Bank | May 18, 2018 | |
| Show! Music Core | May 12, 2018 | |
| Show! Music Core | May 19, 2018 | |
| Inkigayo | May 13, 2018 | |
| Inkigayo | May 20, 2018 | |

== Charts ==
| Chart (2018) | Peak position |
|---|---|
| South Korea (Gaon Digital Chart) | 2 |
| South Korea (K-pop Hot 100) | 3 |

== See also ==
- List of M Countdown Chart winners (2018)
- List of Inkigayo Chart winners (2018)
