= List of awards and nominations received by CNBLUE =

Awards and nominations
Award	Wins	Nominations
Circle Chart Music	1	1
Cyworld Digital Music	3	3
Golden Disc	15	27
MAMA	5	18
Melon Music	4	15
Mnet 20's Choice	0	4
Seoul Music	1	14
Billboard Japan Music Awards	0	3
Gaon Chart Grand Opening Awards	1	1
Gaon Weibo Chart Awards	1	1
Golden Disk in Taiwan	1	1
iQIYI Night Awards	1	1
KOMCA Music Awards	1	1
Korean Popular Culture and Arts Awards	1	1
MTV Europe Music Awards	0	1
MTV Video Music Awards Japan	0	1
Sharing Happiness Awards	1	1
SBS Gayo Daejeon	1	1
SBS MTV Best of the Best	1	1
Style Icon Awards	1	2
Top Chinese Music Awards	1	1
YinYueTai V-Chart Awards	1	1
You2Play Awards (Thailand)	1	1

Totals (Note: Certain award groups do not simply award one winner. They acknowledge several different recipients, have runners-up, and have third place. Since this is a specific recognition and is different from losing an award, runner-up mentions are considered wins in this award tally. For simplification and to avoid errors, each award in this list has been presumed to have had a prior nomination.)
- Wins: 42
- Nominations: 101

This is a list of awards and nominations received by South Korean pop rock band CNBLUE. The band debuted in 2009 in Japan and 2010 in South Korea with four members, under FNC Entertainment.

== Awards ==
=== Golden Disc Awards ===
Golden Disc Awards is an awards show founded in 1986 that is presented annually by the Music Industry Association of Korea for outstanding achievements in the music industry in South Korea.

Year	Category	Recipient	Result
2010	Rookie Award	CNBLUE	Nominated
2010	Popularity Award	CNBLUE	Nominated
2010	Rock Award	"I'm a Loner"	Nominated
2010	Digital Music Bonsang	"I'm a Loner", "Love"	Won
2012	Disk Bonsang	First Step	Won
2012	Digital Music Bonsang	"Intuition"	Won
2012	Most Popular Artist Award	CNBLUE	Nominated
2012	MSN Most Popular Artist Award	CNBLUE	Nominated
2012	Vivi Dream Award	CNBLUE	Won
2012	Best Asian Group Award	CNBLUE	Won
2013	Disk Bonsang	Ear Fun	Won
2013	Popularity Award	CNBLUE	Nominated
2013	Malaysia's Most Favorite	CNBLUE	Won
2014	Disk Bonsang	Re:Blue	Nominated
2014	Digital Music Bonsang	"I'm Sorry"	Won
2014	Popularity Award	CNBLUE	Nominated
2014	Goodwill Star Award	CNBLUE	Won
2015	Disk Bonsang	Can't Stop	Won
2015	Digital Music Bonsang	"Can't Stop"	Nominated
2015	China Goodwill Star Award	CNBLUE	Won
2015	iQIYI Popularity Award	CNBLUE	Won
2015	Ceci Asia Icon Award	CNBLUE	Won
2016	Disk Bonsang	2gether	Won
2016	Digital Music Bonsang	"Cinderella"	Nominated
2017	Best K-pop Band Award	CNBLUE	Won
2018	Disk Bonsang	7°CN	Nominated
2018	Global Popular Artist Award	CNBLUE	Nominated

=== Seoul Music Awards ===
Seoul Music Awards is an awards show founded in 1990 that is presented annually by the Sports Seoul for outstanding achievements in the music industry in South Korea.

Year	Category	Recipient	Result
2010	Rookie Award	CNBLUE	Won
2010	Popularity Award	CNBLUE	Nominated
2011	Bonsang	CNBLUE	Nominated
2011	Popularity Award	CNBLUE	Nominated
2012	Bonsang	CNBLUE	Nominated
2012	Popularity Award	CNBLUE	Nominated
2013	Bonsang	CNBLUE	Nominated
2013	Popularity Award	CNBLUE	Nominated
2014	Bonsang	CNBLUE	Nominated
2014	Popularity Award	CNBLUE	Nominated
2015	Bonsang	CNBLUE	Nominated
2015	Popularity Award	CNBLUE	Nominated
2016	Bonsang	CNBLUE	Nominated
2016	Popularity Award	CNBLUE	Nominated

=== Mnet Asian Music Awards ===
Mnet Asian Music Awards (abbreviated as a MAMA), formerly "M.net KM Music Festival" (MKMF) (1999 - 2008), is a major K-pop music award show that is held by Mnet Media annually in South Korea.

Year	Category	Recipient	Result
2010	Best Male Rookie	"Love"	Won
2010	The Shilla Duty Free Asian Wave	"Love"	Nominated
2010	Best Band Performance	"Love"	Nominated
2011	Best Band Performance	"Intuition"	Won
2011	Song of the Year	"Intuition"	Nominated
2012	Best Global Group - Male	CNBLUE	Nominated
2012	Best Band Performance	"Hey You"	Nominated
2012	Song of the Year	"Hey You"	Nominated
2013	Best Band Performance	"I'm Sorry"	Nominated
2013	Song of the Year	"I'm Sorry"	Nominated
2014	Best Band Performance	"Can't Stop"	Won
2014	Song of the Year	"Can't Stop"	Nominated
2015	Best Band Performance	"Cinderella"	Won
2015	Song of the Year	"Cinderella"	Nominated
2016	Best Band Performance	"You're So Fine"	Won
2016	Song of the Year	"You're So Fine"	Nominated
2017	Best Band Performance	"Between Us"	Nominated
2017	Song of the Year	"Between Us"	Nominated

=== Mnet 20's Choice Awards ===
The Mnet 20's Choice Awards is a major music awards show that is held annually in South Korea, organized by CJ E&M through its Mnet channel.

Year	Category	Recipient	Result
2011	Hot Trend Musician	CNBLUE	Nominated
2011	Hot Hallyu Star	CNBLUE	Nominated
2011	Hot Balance Star	CNBLUE	Nominated
2011	Hot Online Song	"Intuition"	Nominated

=== Melon Music Awards ===
Melon Music Awards is a major music awards show that is held by Melon Music Site and MBC Plus Media annually in South Korea. It is known for only calculating digital sales and online votes to judge winners.

Year	Category	Recipient	Result
2010	Best Newcomer Award	CNBLUE	Won
2010	Top 10	CNBLUE	Won
2010	Song of the Year	"I'm a Loner"	Nominated
2010	Song of the Year	"Love"	Nominated
2010	Album of the Year	Bluetory	Nominated
2010	Artist of the Year	CNBLUE	Nominated
2011	Top 10	CNBLUE	Nominated
2011	Netizen Popularity Award	CNBLUE	Nominated
2011	Song of the Year	"Intuition"	Nominated
2011	Music Style - Best Rock	"Intuition"	Won
2012	Music Style - Best Rock	"Hey You"	Nominated
2013	Music Style - Best Rock	"I'm Sorry"	Nominated
2014	Music Style - Best Rock	"Can't Stop"	Won
2015	Music Style - Best Rock	"Cinderella"	Nominated
2016	Music Style - Best Rock	"You're So Fine"	Nominated

=== Gaon Chart Music Awards ===
The Gaon Chart Music Awards is a major music awards show that is held annually in South Korea by the national music record chart Gaon Chart.

Year	Category	Recipient	Result
2013	Hallyu Special Award	CNBLUE	Won

=== Cyworld Digital Music Awards ===
Cyworld Digital Music Awards is based on the BGM chart that started in 2006 the first Republic of Korea, No.1 representative of the Digital Music Awards . The Winners Chosen By Combining Both Digital Sales & Online Background Music Of The Cyworld Users.

Year	Category	Recipient	Result
2010	Rookie of the Month (January)	"I'm a Loner"	Won
2010	Rookie of the Year	"I'm a Loner"	Won
2011	Song of the Month (April)	"Intuition"	Won

== Other awards ==
Year	Bout	Award	Nominated work	Result	Ref
Gaon Chart Grand Opening Awards
2010		Streaming Award	"Im a Loner"	Won	
Style Icon Awards
2010	3rd	New Style Icon, Singer	CNBLUE	Won	
2012	5th	Top 10 Style Icons	CNBLUE	Nominated	
KOMCA Music Awards
2011	1st	Rock Award	"I'm a Loner"	Won	
You2Play Awards (Thailand)
2011		Favorite Asian Artist	CNBLUE	Won	
Billboard Japan Music Awards
2011		Independent Artist Of The Year	CNBLUE	Nominated	
2011		Animation Artist Of The Year	CNBLUE	Nominated	
2012		Top Pop Artist	CNBLUE	Nominated	
MTV Video Music Awards Japan
2011		Best New Artist Video	"In My Head"	Nominated	
Sharing Happiness Awards
2013	3rd	International Sharing Award	CNBLUE	Won	
YinYueTai V-Chart Awards
2014	2nd	Best Band Award	CNBLUE	Won	
Gaon Weibo Chart Awards
2014	1st	Gaon Weibo Chart Group Award	CNBLUE	Won	
Golden Disk in Taiwan
2014		Selling more than 5.000 copies	Blue Hits for Asia (CNBLUE's special album)	Won	
2014 MTV Europe Music Awards
2014		Best Korean Act	CNBLUE	Nominated	
2015 iQIYI Night Awards
2014	1st	Asia Best Group	CNBLUE	Won	
SBS Gayo Daejeon
2014		Syrup Best Band Award	CNBLUE	Won	
SBS MTV Best of the Best
2014		Best Band Award	CNBLUE	Won	
Top Chinese Music Awards
2015	15th	Foreign Popular Group Award	CNBLUE	Won	

== Other accolades ==
=== State honors ===
Name of country, year given, and name of honor
Country	Year	Honor	Ref.
South Korea (Note: Honors are given at the Korean Popular Culture and Arts Awards, arranged by the Korea Creative Content Agency and hosted by the Ministry of Culture, Sports and Tourism. They are awarded to those who have contributed to the arts and South Korea's pop culture.)	2011	Minister of Culture, Sports and Tourism Commendation	

=== Listicles ===
Name of publisher, year listed, name of listicle, and placement
Publisher	Year	Listicle	Placement	Ref.
Forbes	2012	Korea Power Celebrity	33rd	
Forbes	2013	Korea Power Celebrity	21st	
Forbes	2014	Korea Power Celebrity	15th	
