= CNBLUE videography =

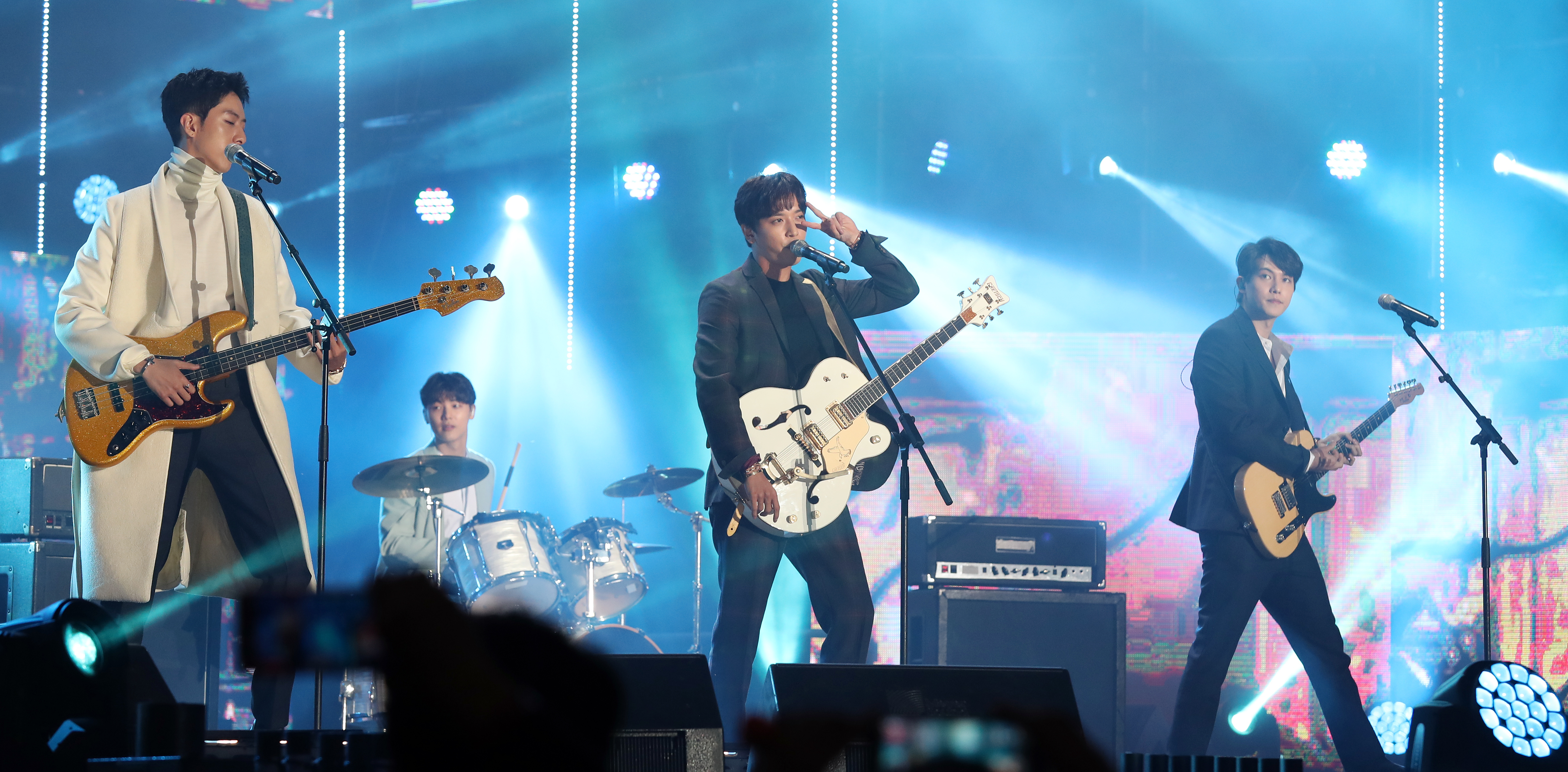
CNBLUE at Korea Sale Festa in 2016

South Korean band CNBLUE has released 32 music videos and 23 video albums. The band has appeared on various television shows, as well as its own documentary film.

== Music videos ==
Title	Year	Director(s)	Ref.
Korean
"I'm a Loner"	2010		
"Love"	2010	Masakazu Fukatsu	
"Intuition"	2011		
"Love Girl"	2011	Masakazu Fukatsu	
"Still in Love"	2012		
"Hey You"	2012		
"Friday"	2012		
"I'm Sorry"	2013		
"Feel Good"	2013		
"Can't Stop"	2014		
"Cinderella"	2015		
"You're So Fine"	2016	Lee HJ	
"Between Us"	2017	Jung Jin-su	
"Love Cut"	2021	Gudals Kim	
Japanese
"In My Head"	2011	Shin Nagashima; Yoshihito Mori	
"Where You Are"	2012	Shin Nagashima; Yoshihito Mori	
"Come On"	2012	Shin Nagashima; Yoshihito Mori	
"Time Is Over"	2012	Shin Nagashima; Yoshihito Mori	
"Robot"	2012	Shin Nagashima; Yoshihito Mori	
"Blind Love"	2013	Shin Nagashima; Yoshihito Mori	
"Lady"	2013	Fukui Hideaki	
"One More Time"	2013	Mao Muramatsu	
"Truth"	2014	Hong Won-ki	
"Still"	2014	Murakami Tatsuya	
"Go Your Way"	2014	Hong Won-ki	
"Radio"	2014	Wataru Saitō	
"White"	2015	Mitsuishi Naoya	
"Supernova"	2015	Michihito Fujii	
"Puzzle"	2016	Surplus X Production	
"Glory Days"	2016	Lee Ho-jae	
"Shake"	2017	Jinsoo Chung	
"Starting Over"	2017	Hong Won-ki	
"Don't Say Good Bye"	2018	Hong Won-ki; Genki Kojima	

== Video albums ==
Title	Album details	Peak positions			Sales
Title	Album details	KOR	JPN		Sales
Title	Album details	KOR	DVD	BD	Sales
Korean
Listen to the CNBLUE 1st Live Concert 2010 @ Ax-Korea	Released: June 22, 2011; Label: AI Entertainment; Formats: DVD	—	15	—	
CNBLUE Blue Storm	Released: February 2, 2012; Label: SBS Production; Formats: DVD	—	—	—	
2012 CNBLUE Live in Seoul: Blue Night	Released: August 21, 2013; Label: FNC Music Japan; Formats: DVD	—	25	—	
CNBLUE 2013 World Tour Live in Seoul Blue Moon	Released: December 25, 2013; Label: FNC Music Japan; Formats: DVD	—	16	—	
Come Together Tour	Released: August 3, 2016; Label: FNC Entertainment; Formats: DVD	10	3	—	
CNBLUE [Between Us] Tour	Released: March 28, 2018; Label: Loen Entertainment; Formats: DVD	22	—	—	
Japanese
CNBLUE 2nd Single Release Live Tour: Listen to the CNBLUE	Released: February 9, 2011; Label: AI Entertainment; Formats: DVD	—	5	—	
CNBLUE Zepp Tour 2011: Re-maintenance @ Zepp Tokyo	Released: April 25, 2011; Label: AI Entertainment; Formats: DVD	—	16	—	
CNBLUE Special	Released: August 1, 2011; Label: KBS Media; Formats: DVD	—	26	—	
CNBLUE 2nd Album Release Live 392 @ Yokohama Arena	Released: December 28, 2011; Label: AI Entertainment; Formats: DVD	—	6	—	
CNBLUE Winter Tour 2011 Here, In My Head @ Yoyogi National Gymnasium	Released: March 14, 2012; Label: Warner Music Japan; Formats: DVD	—	2	—	
MTV Unplugged	Released: June 27, 2012; Label: Warner Music Japan; Formats: DVD	—	4	—	
CNBLUE Arena Tour 2012 Come On!!! @ Saitama Super Arena	Released: March 20, 2013; Label: Warner Music Japan; Formats: DVD, Blu-ray	—	3	13	
Zepp Tour 2013 Lady @ Zepp Tokyo	Released: October 2, 2013; Label: Warner Music Japan; Formats: DVD, Blu-ray	—	2	6	
Arena Tour 2013 One More Time @ Nippon Gaishi Hall	Released: March 5, 2014; Label: Warner Music Japan; Formats: DVD, Blu-ray	—	3	21	
2014 Arena Tour "Wave" @ Osaka-jo Hall	Released: March 11, 2015; Label: Warner Music Japan; Formats: DVD, Blu-ray	—	4	18	
Spring Live 2015 "White" @ Yokohama Arena	Released: August 5, 2015; Label: Warner Music Japan; Formats: DVD, Blu-ray	—	3	13	
2015 Arena Tour: Be a Supernova @ Osaka-jo Hall	Released: April 13, 2016; Label: Warner Music Japan; Formats: DVD, Blu-ray	—	3	5	
Spring Live 2016 "We're Like a Puzzle" @ Nippon Budokan	Released: September 21, 2016; Label: Warner Music Japan; Formats: DVD, Blu-ray	—	3	8	
5th Anniversary Arena Tour 2016 "Our Glory Days" @Nippon Gaishi Hall	Released: March 29, 2017; Label: Warner Music Japan; Formats: DVD, Blu-ray	—	10	19	
Spring Live 2017 "Shake! Shake!" @Osaka-jo Hall	Released: October 18, 2017; Label: Warner Music Japan; Formats: DVD, Blu-ray	—	5	10	
2017 CNBLUE Live "Between Us" Tour	Released: March 28, 2018; Label: Warner Music Japan; Formats: DVD	—	8	—	
2017 Arena Tour Live "Starting Over" @Yokohama Arena	Released: May 9, 2018; Label: Warner Music Japan; Formats: DVD, Blu-ray	—	2	7	JPN: 12,059

== Filmography ==
=== Television ===
Title	Year	Network	Notes	Ref.
Making the Artist: CNBLUE	2010	GomTV	Reality show	
CNBLUETORY	2010	Mnet	Reality show	
CNBLUE's Love on Party	2012	O'live	Reality show	
Cheongdam-dong 111	2013–2014	tvN	Reality show	
Can't Stop	2014	SBS	All-live comeback show	
Secret Tour: Don't Call My Name	2020	tvN	Reality show	

=== Film ===
Title	Year	Role	Notes	Ref.
The Story of CNBLUE: Never Stop	2014	Themselves	Documentary	
