= List of Music Bank Chart winners (2016) =

Music Bank Chart winners (2016)

Highlights
- Song with most wins: "Cheer Up" & "TT" by Twice (5)
- Artist(s) with most wins: Twice (10)
- Song with highest score: "Monster" by Exo (11,570)

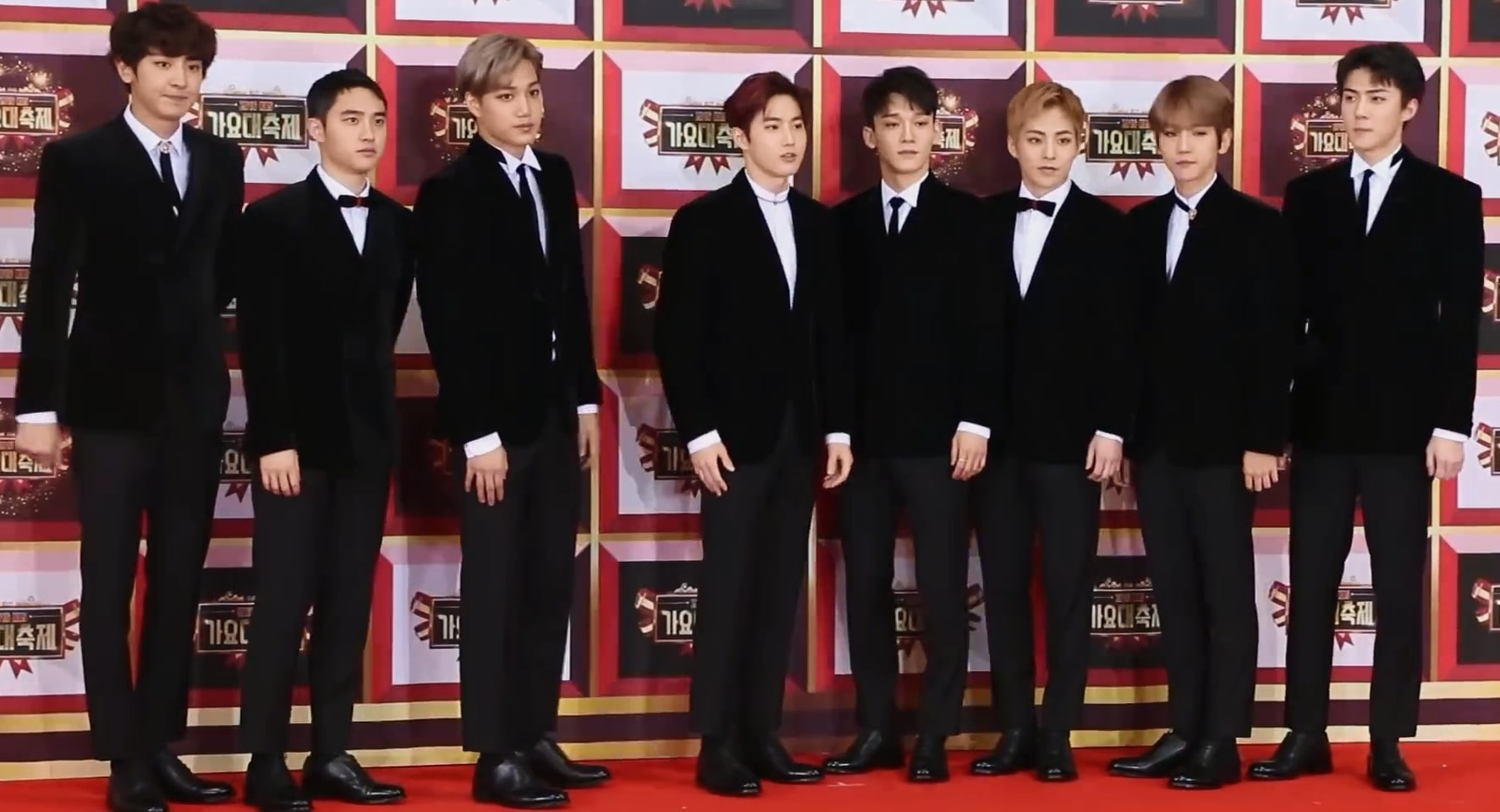
"Monster" by Exo (pictured) earned the highest score of 2016, with 11,570 points on the June 17th broadcast.

The Music Bank Chart is a record chart established in 1998 on the South Korean KBS television music program Music Bank. Every week during its live broadcast, the show gives an award for the best-performing single on the South Korean chart. The chart includes digital performance on domestic online music services (65%), album sales (5%), number of times the single was broadcast on KBS TV (20%), and viewers' choice (10%) in its ranking methodology. The score for domestic online music services is calculated using data from Melon, Bugs, Genie Music and Soribada. Actor and singer Park Bo-gum and Red Velvet member Irene, who had been the hosts of the show since May 2015, continued to do so until June 24, 2016. Kang Min-hyuk of CNBLUE and Laboum member Ahn Sol-bin were announced as new hosts the following week. Son Dong-woon from boy group Highlight appeared as a special host on the July 15 broadcast. Kang Min-hyuk left the show on November 4, and the following week Lee Seo-won was announced as the new host along with Ahn Sol-bin.

In 2016, 32 singles reached number one on the chart, and 24 acts were awarded first-place trophies. The year began with "Sing for You" by Exo at number one; it had been in the top spot on the last chart of 2015. "Cheer Up" and "TT" by Twice spent five weeks at number one, making both singles the most awarded songs of the year. The total of ten weeks which the singles spent at number one made Twice the act with the most wins of the year. Of all releases for the year Exo's "Monster" acquired the highest point total on the June 17 broadcast with a score of 11,570. The group achieved four number ones in 2016, the most of any act during the year: "Sing for You", "Monster", "Lotto" and "For Life". Member Baekhyun along with Miss A member Suzy won their first Music Bank trophy as soloists for their collaboration song "Dream".

A number of acts achieved their first number ones in 2016. Han Dong-geun won his first ever music show trophy on Music Bank with "Making a New Ending for This Story". Girl group GFriend had two number one singles on the chart achieved with "Rough" and "Navillera". Their win for "Rough" on the February 5 broadcast marked their first number one on Music Bank. Six other acts gained their first number ones on the chart, beginning with Mamamoo, who topped the chart in March with "You're the Best". Two other girl groups gained their first number one on the chart: Twice with "Cheer Up" and I.O.I with "Whatta Man" on the May 6 and August 19 broadcast respectively. The other first time chart toppers were Got7 with "Fly" and BtoB with "Remember That". Additionally, Seventeen made their first appearance at number one with "Boom Boom" on the December 16 broadcast. At the end of the year, "For Life" by Exo was at number one on the chart.

== Chart history ==
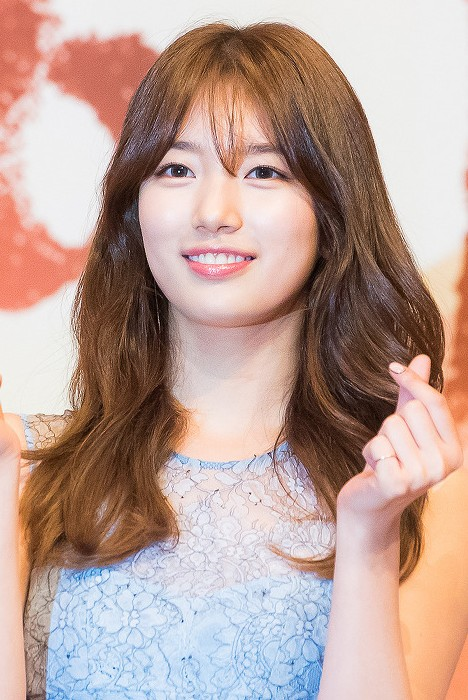
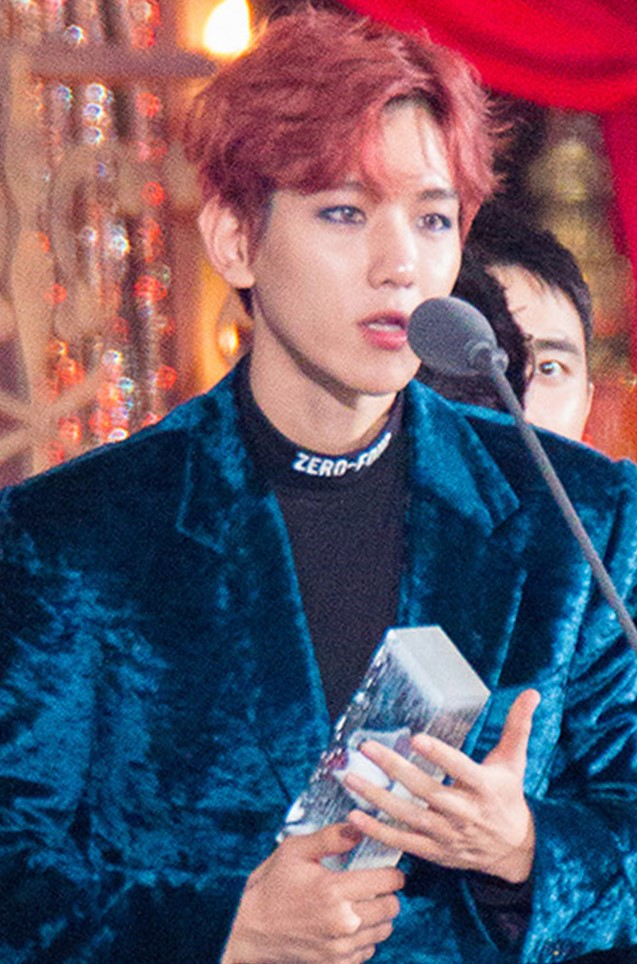
The Music Bank trophies of "Dream" by Miss A's Suzy (left) and Exo's Baekhyun (right) granted both singers their first ever individual music show wins.
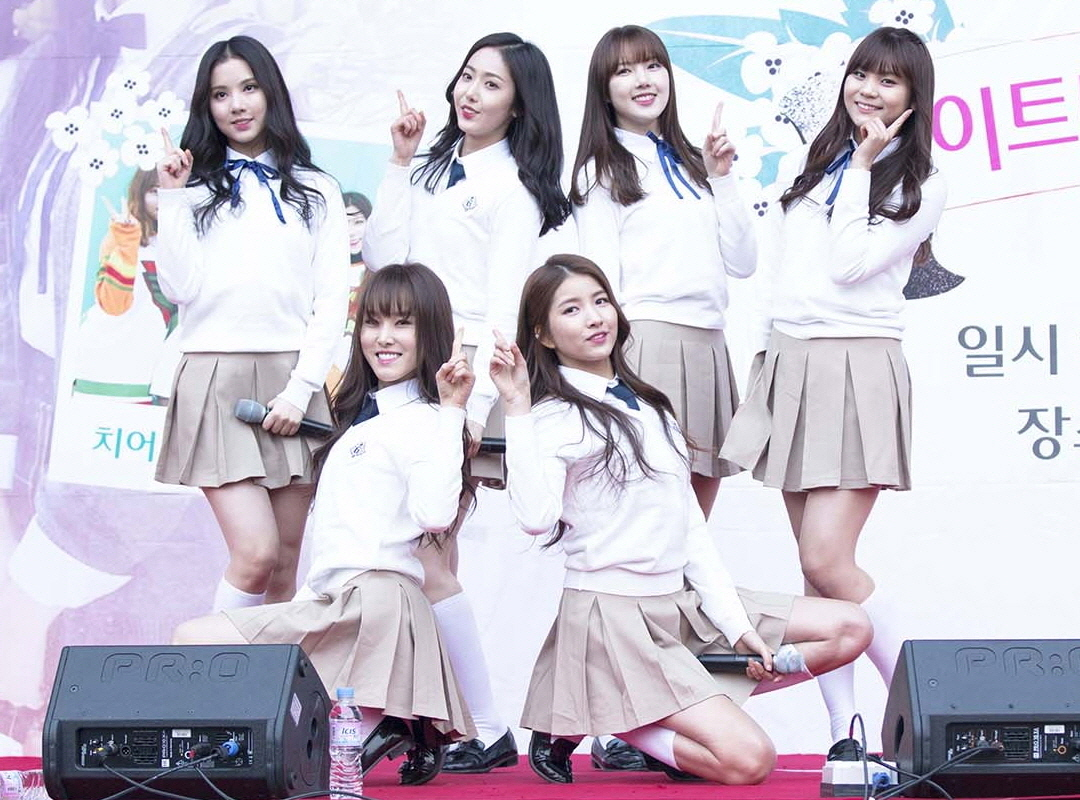
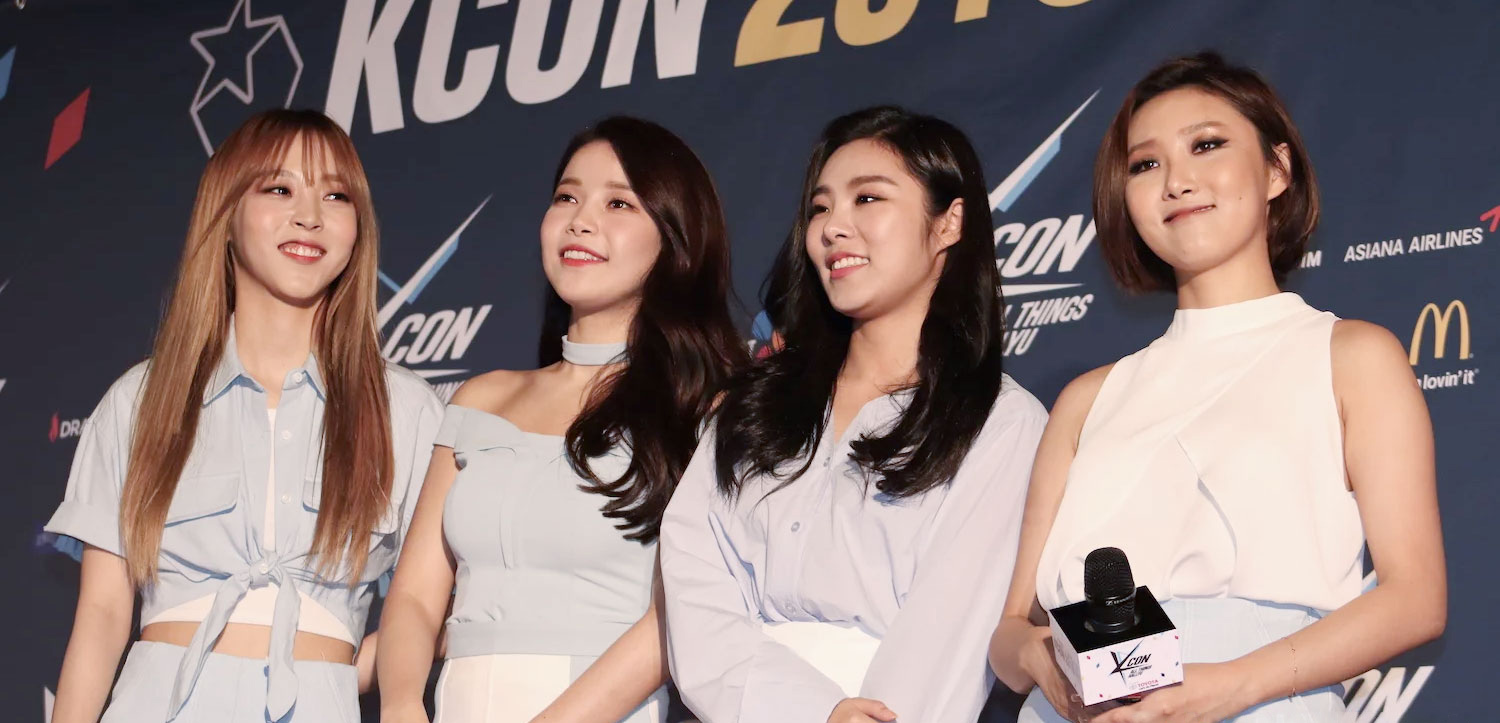
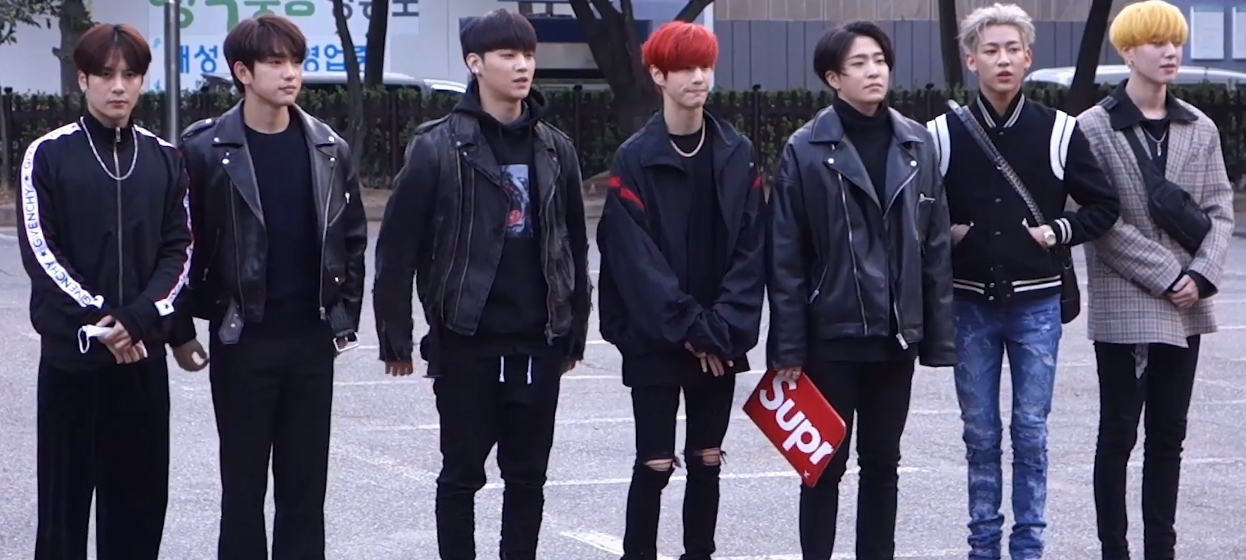
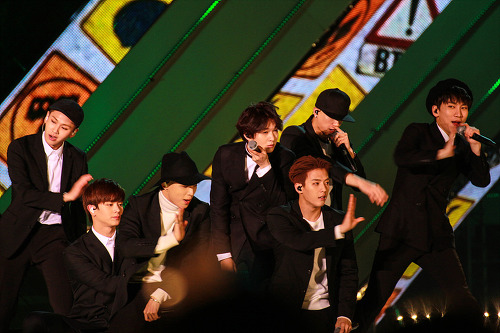
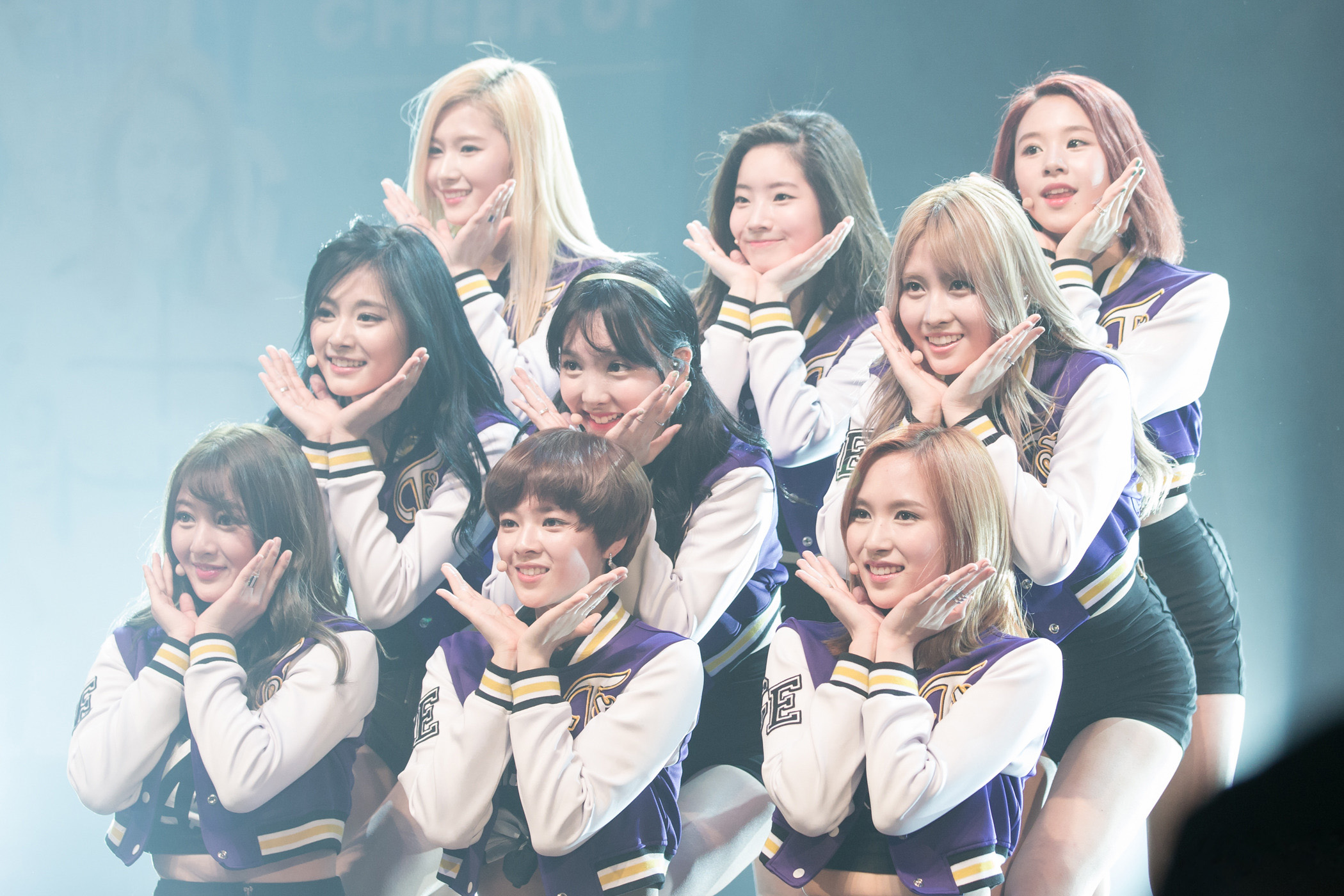
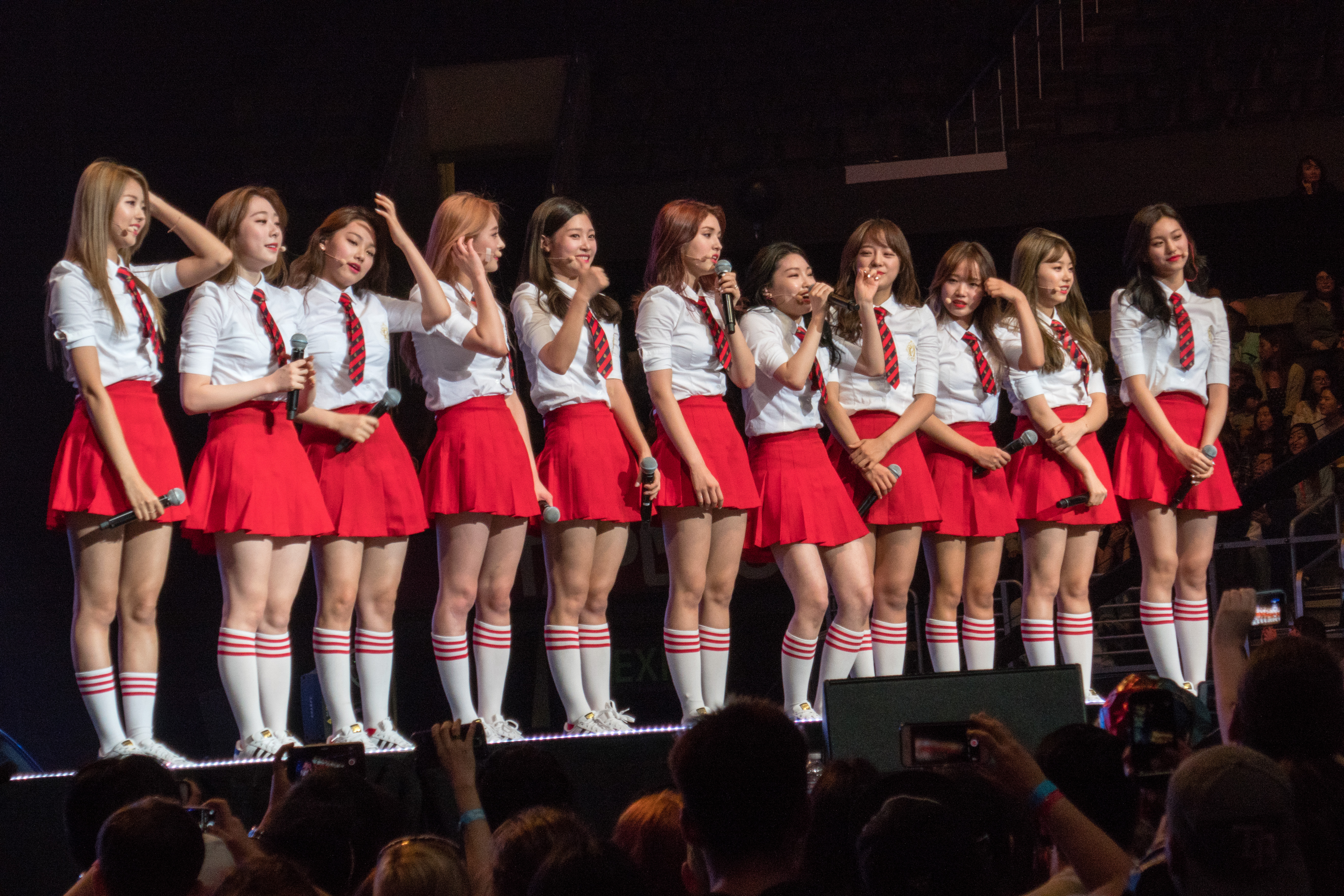
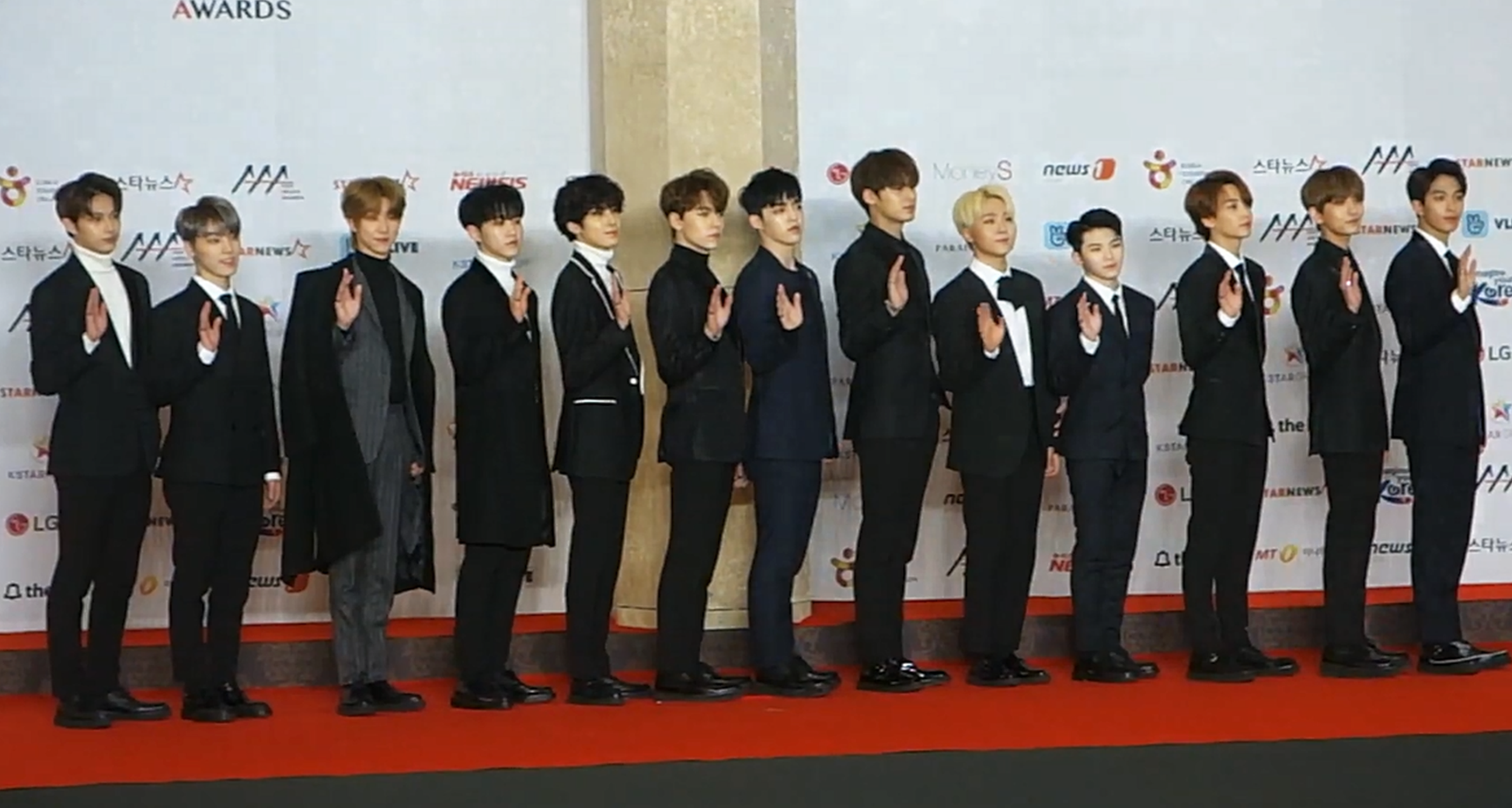
Seven groups received their first major broadcast music show wins on Music Bank in 2016 (from top to bottom): GFriend, Mamamoo, Got7, BtoB, Twice, I.O.I, and Seventeen.

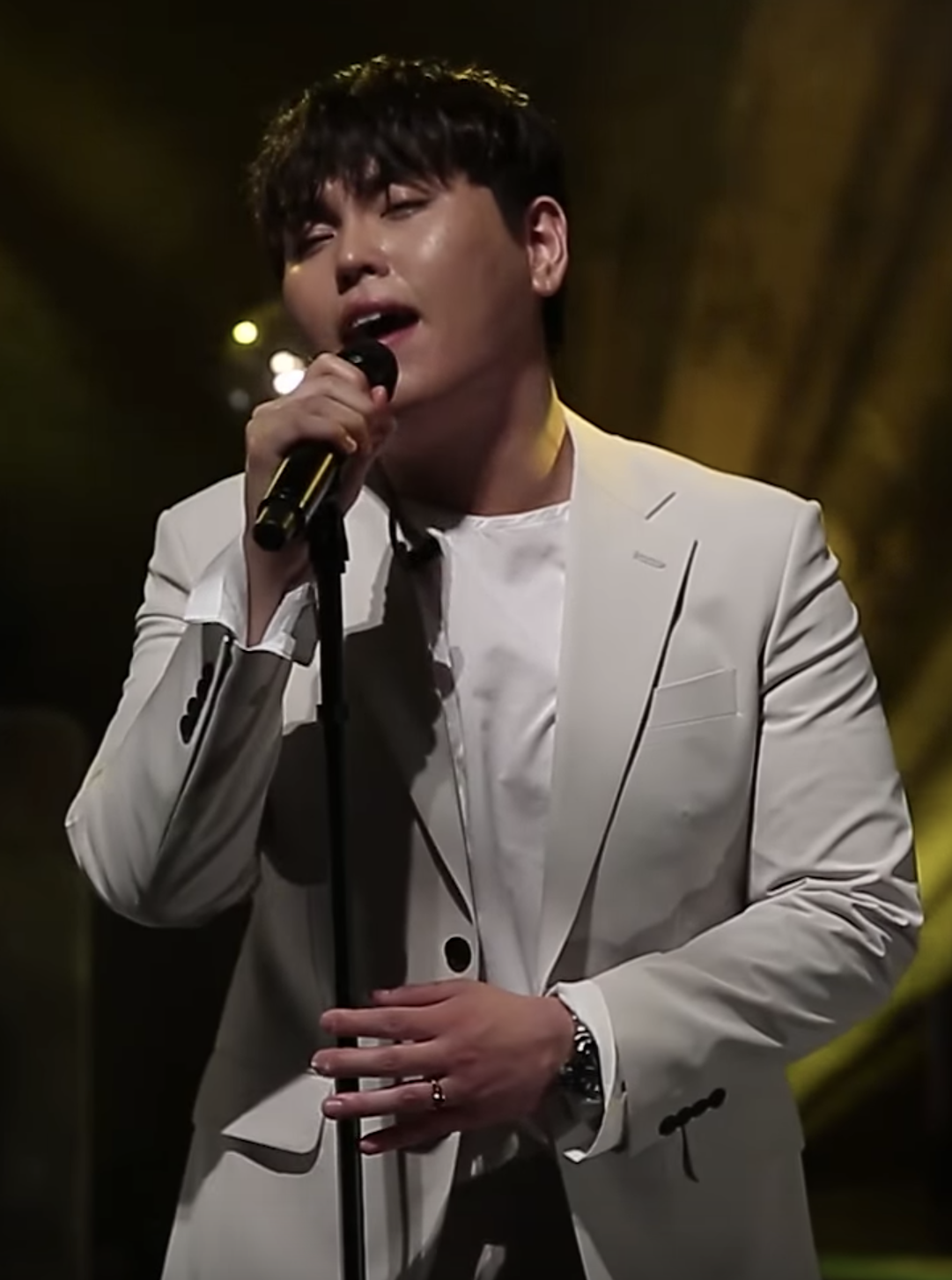
Han Dong-geun (pictured) won his first ever music show trophy on Music Bank for "Making a New Ending for This Story."

Key
‡	Highest score in 2016
—	No show was broadcast

Chart history
Episode	Date	Artist	Song	Points	Ref.
— (Note: This week's winners were announced on the station's official website.)	January 1	Exo	"Sing for You"	4,893	
818	January 8	BTS	"Run"	4,765	
819	January 15	Suzy & Baekhyun	"Dream"	4,229	
820	January 22	Suzy & Baekhyun	"Dream"	8,391	
821	January 29	Teen Top	"Warning Sign"	7,128	
822	February 5	GFriend	"Rough"	6,605	
823	February 12	GFriend	"Rough"	6,823	
824	February 19	GFriend	"Rough"	6,377	
825	February 26	GFriend	"Rough"	6,215	
826	March 4	Taemin	"Press Your Number"	6,229	
827	March 11	Mamamoo	"You're the Best"	7,370	
828	March 18	Mamamoo	"You're the Best"	5,537	
829	March 25	Red Velvet	"One of These Nights"	6,427	
830	April 1	Got7	"Fly"	6,967	
831	April 8	BtoB	"Remember That"	6,140	
832	April 15	CNBLUE	"You're So Fine"	5,763	
833	April 22	CNBLUE	"You're So Fine"	4,974	
834	April 29	VIXX	"Dynamite"	6,262	
835	May 6	Twice	"Cheer Up"	8,079	
836	May 13	BTS	"Fire"	8,869	
837	May 20	Twice	"Cheer Up"	6,535	
838	May 27	Twice	"Cheer Up"	6,350	
839	June 3	Twice	"Cheer Up"	6,535	
840	June 10	Twice	"Cheer Up"	5,734	
841	June 17	Exo	"Monster"	11,570 ‡	
842	June 24	Exo	"Monster"	10,188	
843	July 1	Exo	"Monster"	7,837	
844	July 8	Taeyeon	"Starlight"	8,425	
845	July 15	Beast	"Ribbon"	6,539	
846	July 22	GFriend	"Navillera"	6,851	
847	July 29	GFriend	"Navillera"	6,648	
848	August 5	Wonder Girls	"Why So Lonely"	6,284	
849	August 12	GFriend	"Navillera"	6,499	
850	August 19	I.O.I	"Whatta Man (Good Man)"	7,128	
851	August 26	Exo	"Lotto"	8,574	
852	September 2	Exo	"Lotto"	7,151	
853	September 9	Han Dong-geun	"Making a New Ending for This Story"	6,421	
—	September 16	Im Chang-jung	"The Love That I Committed"	9,813	
854	September 23	Im Chang-jung	"The Love That I Committed"	10,315	
855	September 30	Infinite	"The Eye"	9,129	
856	October 7	Got7	"Hard Carry"	7,438	
857	October 14	Shinee	"1 of 1"	7,100	
858	October 21	BTS	"Blood Sweat & Tears"	10,985	
859	October 28	BTS	"Blood Sweat & Tears"	8,384	
860	November 4	Twice	"TT"	11,274	
861	November 11	Twice	"TT"	8,127	
862	November 18	Twice	"TT"	7,429	
863	November 25	Twice	"TT"	7,580	
864	December 2	Twice	"TT"	6,218	
865	December 9	B1A4	"A Lie"	6,694	
866	December 16	Seventeen	"Boom Boom"	7,252	
867	December 23	Big Bang	"Last Dance"	4,720	
—	December 30	Exo	"For Life"	8,142	
