= Blueming =

Blueming may refer to:

- "Blueming" (song) by IU, 2019
- Blueming (EP) by CNBLUE, 2016
