= Remember That =

Remember That may also refer to:

- "Remember That" (Jessica Simpson song), 2008
- "Remember That" (BtoB song), 2016
- Remember That (EP), a 2016 EP by BtoB
