= Blueming (EP) =

EP by CNBLUE
- Released: April 4, 2016
- Recorded: 2015–16
- Studio: FNC Entertainment Studio (Seoul)
- Genre: Pop rock
- Length: 19:49
- Language: Korean, English
- Label: FNC Entertainment
- Producer: Han Seong-ho (exec.); Jung Yong-hwa; Han Seung-hoon; Kim Jae-yang

CNBLUE chronology
Colors (2015)	Blueming (2016)	Euphoria (2016)

Singles from Blueming
- 1. "You're So Fine" Released: April 4, 2016

Blueming (stylized BLUEMING) is the sixth extended play by South Korean band CNBLUE. It was released on April 4, 2016, under FNC Entertainment and distributed by LOEN Entertainment. The band began developing the record within the same time period as "Cinderella" from 2gether (2015). Writing and recording for the album commenced in midst of the 2015 CNBLUE Live "Come Together" concert tour. Upon its completion, the band's record label announced that the quartet would release a mini-album.

Musically, Blueming is a pop rock record filled with songs which suit the spring season. Following a series of photo and video teasers, the mini-album and lead single "You're So Fine" were concurrently released. Blueming topped the weekly Gaon Album Chart and received favorable reviews from music critics. CNBLUE began promoting the record on music chart programs across various television networks by performing the single.

== Background ==
Upon their debut with Bluetory (2010), CNBLUE was met with immediate commercial success. Within two weeks, the quartet earned their first music show win with "I'm a Loner". With the albums that followed, the band did not meet the same instant success. With the addition of crafting their own music, CNBLUE faced mounting pressure which "daunted the band members for years".

On March 16, 2016, it was reported that CNBLUE was scheduled to release an album in early April. Six days later, it was announced that the band would release a mini-album entitled Blueming on April 4. A portmanteau of "CNBLUE" and "blooming", the record is meant to showcase the "blossoming of CNBLUE's new musical horizons". The release of the mini-album comes off the heels of the 2015 CNBLUE Live "Come Together" concert tour.

== Writing and recording ==
CNBLUE began conceiving Blueming while developing "Cinderella". Between the members' solo activities and CNBLUE's concert tours, the bandmates took the opportunity to record songs. Although not intended coincide with the spring season, vocalist Jung Yong-hwa sought to release "refreshing, breezy music" as soon as possible. Unlike with previous releases, the band did not pen any specific song with the intention of releasing it as a lead single. Instead, CNBLUE chose from a pool of songs which they had written. The band deliberated between "You're So Fine" and "Young Forever"; they agreed upon the former because it "sounded the best".

"Looking back on those days, I think it was my obsession with fans leaving me that bound me (to such pessimism). Then I learned to thank the fans who chose to stand by me. I wanted to repay the love from the fans who stayed."

— Jung Yong-hwa on CNBLUE's immediate success upon debut

After examining their past in retrospect, Jung took the opportunity to write "Young Forever" in midst of a bout of insomnia. Jung explained that, "we had our own hard times", but he desired to "overcome them with our passion". "Stay Sober" was initially included on the band's Japanese single "White". Jung attempted to translate the lyrics in Korean, but he "loved" the original lyrics and believed that they "felt the best". The track was one of several omitted from previous releases; Jung re-arranged the song in order to add it to an album afterwards. He felt that the inclusion of the song brought balance to the record by each track bearing a specific "element".

Blueming was recorded at the FNC Entertainment Studio

In midst of promoting "Cinderella" on KBS2's You Hee-yeol's Sketchbook in 2015, guitarist Lee Jong-hyun performed a song entitled "Shaving" (Korean: 면도; RR: Myeondo) during the program; he rewrote the lyrics to what would become "The Seasons". Originally titled "Four Seasons" (사계; Sagye), he changed the title of the song after it was perceived as "too old-fashioned" by staff of the record company. Initially, he wrote the song for the purpose of including it in his debut solo album, but felt it would "suit well if we perform the song together". Blueming also includes bassist Lee Jung-shin's first contribution to composition of the band's Korean catalog. Jung cited this as testament to the musical progression of the band. Drummer Kang Min-hyuk attempted to create songs for inclusion on Blueming, but ultimately they did not come to fruition. The mini-album was recorded in Seoul at the FNC Entertainment Studio. Mixing took place there and at the Bono Studio; it was mastered at the JFS Mastering Studio.

== Music structure ==
A pop rock record, Blueming compromises "soft" music meant to "maximize the romantic air of spring". CNBLUE strays from the theme of breakup and features songs that are upbeat, "sweet", and "bright"; the ambience of the songs are meant to correspond with the spring season. "You're So Fine" is a love song with "rhythmical" sense. Emitting elements of ska music, "The Seasons" compares relationships to the weather of the seasons. The song compromises a rhythm guitar, piano, and acoustic guitar; the lattermost is set in a shuffle rhythm. Centered around a snare drum, "Young Forever" is a pop ballad; the track incorporates instrument recordings played backwards. In contrast to the other songs, "Without You" is a breakup song. A rock ballad, it integrates string instruments and a piano. Lyrically, "Stay Sober" begs the narrator's former love to keep him in their mind.

== Artwork concept and packaging ==
Blueming was released in two editions: versions A and B. They come encased in a sleeve case and hard cover, which include a 72-page photo booklet, one of four possible random photo cards between two sets, and one poster. Conceptually, the photography showcases the band as boyfriends. Set in a coffee shop, the photography of version A depicts the band members dressed in business casual clothing, anticipating the arrival of their respective girlfriends. Dressed casually, version B revolves around the idea of the photos being taken by said girlfriends.

== Release and promotion ==
On March 24, a teaser photo of the band was published. On the following day, two sets of individual photo teasers for version A of Blueming were released. Two sets of individual photos for version B followed on March 28, in addition to a second group photo. The first music video teaser was released on March 31. On the subsequent day, a highlight medley for the mini-album was released. A second music video teaser was released on April 3. Hours prior to the release of the mini-album, each member of CNBLUE took part in a "virtual date" stream on Naver's mobile app V. CNBLUE also hosted the "So Fine Show?!" stream one hour before the release of the mini-album.

Blueming and the music video for "You're So Fine" were simultaneously released on April 4. On April 7, CNBLUE began promoting "You're So Fine" by performing the song on weekly music chart shows. In addition to the lead single, the band also performed "Young Forever" on Mnet's M Countdown, Korean Broadcasting System's (KBS) Music Bank, Munhwa Broadcasting Corporation's (MBC) Show! Music Core, and Seoul Broadcasting System's (SBS) Inkigayo. The band also performed on SBS MTV's The Show and MBC Music's Show Champion, where the single earned its first two respective music show wins. "You're So Fine" earned its third and fourth wins on M Countdown and Music Bank on the days that followed. It went on to earn second consecutive wins on both The Show and Music Bank, bringing the total of music show wins up to six.

CNBLUE were guests on KBS2's talk show You Hee-yeol's Sketchbook, where they performed "You're So Fine", as well as "Radio" and "Love Light". The band also performed the lead single on SBS Power FM's Cultwo Show for the 10th Anniversary Legend Concert .

== Critical reception ==
Writing for Fuse, columnist Jeff Benjamin expressed that CNBLUE "continues to expand its musical palette" on what he considers an "ambitious" mini-album. He felt that the band was capable to making "You're So Fine" sound "fresh", and noted the similarities between the lead single and "Hold My Hand" from 2gether. He cited "The Seasons" as being a "standout" track and described CNBLUE's "growing crossover potential" with the all-English "Stay Sober". Three critics opined on the record for TV Daily: Kim Ji-ha dubbed the lead single "sweet" and noted "Young Forever" for its "memorable lyrics"; Kim Han-gil referred to Blueming as a "charming album"; and Lee Yun-min complimented CNBLUE for "making band music", which he deemed "a rarity" in the current musical climate.

Rating Blueming three stars out of five, Gwendolyn Ng of The Straits Times compared the record to "enjoying the cool spring breeze". She expressed that "the mellow tunes are soothing, but don't leave an impression", citing the absence of the band's "signature sound" from "I'm a Loner" and "Can't Stop". In relating Jung's solo album One Fine Day (2015), 2gether (2015), and Blueming, music critic Kim Yoon-ha of Idology commented that Jung established an "on-and-off" pursuit of earning a "stamp of approval" for his songwriting, in where he creates "easy-listening songwriting that can tailor to various themes". She noted that Blueming incorporates Jung's "signature, simple yet memorable melodies and everyday words". Also writing for Idology as 'Mimyo', musician Moon Yong-min felt it could be argued that CNBLUE took Japanese influences in mixing the theme of spring with the ikemen ideal, as the band had done in combining the "rocker duo–summer dance tunes" in "Cinderella". He felt "impressed" by the band's ability to integrate music styles of spring and the Hongdae, Seoul area, in which they "borrowed each of their elements, yet still managed to hit that narrow balance without spilling into one side".

== Commercial performance ==
On the chart dated April 3 – 9, 2016, Blueming debuted at number one on the Gaon Album Chart. It fell to number two on the following week. By the end of April, the mini-album sold 64,279 copies in South Korea. It ranked at number 10 on Billboard magazine's World Albums Chart. In Japan, the mini-album debuted at number 13 on the weekly Oricon Albums Chart, selling 3,386 copies in its first week. It sold an additional 3,817 copies in its second week, ranking at number 15. It has sold 10,690 copies in the country since its release.

== Track listing ==
Track listing
No.	Title	Lyrics	Music	Arrangement	Length
1.	"You're So Fine" (이렇게 예뻤나; Ireoke Yeppeonna)	Jung Yong-hwa	Jung Yong-hwa	Jung Yong-hwa, Ko Jin-yeong, Lee Sang-ho	3:52
2.	"The Seasons"	Lee Jong-hyun, Kim Jae-yang	Lee Jong-hyun, Kim Jae-yang, Park Hyun-woo	Kim Jae-yang, Park Hyun-woo	3:49
3.	"Young Forever"	Jung Yong-hwa	Jung Yong-hwa	Jung Yong-hwa, Park Hyun-woo	4:00
4.	"Without You"	Lee Jung-shin, Kim Jae-yang	Lee Jung-shin, Han Seung-hoon	Ko Jin-yeong	4:16
5.	"Stay Sober"	Jung Yong-hwa, Innovator	Jung Yong-hwa	Kim Jae-yang, Park Hyun-woo	3:52
Total length:					19:49

== Personnel ==
Credits adapted from the album's liner notes.

- CNBLUE – chorus
- Jung Yong-hwa – record producer, composer, lyricist, arranger, guitar
- Kang Min-hyuk – drums
- Lee Jong-hyun – composer, lyricist, guitar
- Lee Jung-shin – composer, lyricist, bass
- Erik Lidbom – horns arranger
- Johan Åström – trombone
- Choi Hun – bass
- Go Seung-wook – mixing engineer
- Albin Grahn – trumpet
- Han Seong-ho – executive producer
- Han Seung-hoon – producer, composer, arranger, piano, synthesizer
- Innovative – lyricist
- Jeon Geun-hwa – chorus
- Jo Seong-wan – supervisor
- Jung Jae-pil – guitar
- Kim Jae-yang – producer, composer, lyricist, arranger, piano, synthesizer
- Ko Jin-yeong – arranger, bass, piano, synthesizer
- Kwon Woo-mi – A&R
- Lee Sang-ho – arranger
- Lee Tae-wook – guitar
- Lee Yu-jin – recording engineer, mixing engineer
- Oh Dan-yeong – recording engineer
- Samuel Muntlin – saxophone
- Seong Ji-hun – mastering engineer
- Park Hyun-woo – composer, arranger, guitar
- Park Jeong-min – recording engineer
- Park Jin-se – recording engineer
- Zoo Yong-gyun – photography

== Charts ==
Chart (2016)	Peak position
Billboard World Albums Chart	10
Gaon Album Chart	1
Oricon Albums Chart	13

== Release history ==
List of release dates, showing region, edition, formats, label, and reference
Region	Date	Edition(s)	Format(s)	Label	Ref.
South Korea	April 4, 2016	Version A	CD	FNC; LOEN Entertainment	
Various	April 4, 2016	Standard	Digital download	FNC; LOEN Entertainment	
Taiwan	April 7, 2016	Standard	Digital download	Warner Music Taiwan	
Japan	April 7, 2016	Version A	CD	FNC; LOEN Entertainment	
South Korea	April 11, 2016	Version B	CD	FNC; LOEN Entertainment	
