= Love Light =

CNBLUE song

Single by CNBLUE

from the album Bluelove
- Language: Korean
- Released: May 10, 2010
- Recorded: 2010
- Length: 3:12
- Label: FNC
- Songwriter: Jung Yong-hwa

CNBLUE singles chronology
| "I'm a Loner" (2010) | "Love Light" (2010) | "Love" (2010) |

"Love Light" (Korean: 사랑 빛; RR: Sarang Bit) is a song recorded by South Korean rock band CNBLUE. It is a single from the band's second mini-album Bluelove. An acoustic ballad written by main vocalist Jung Yong-hwa, the track was released by FNC Entertainment and distributed by Kakao M on May 10, 2010. The song peaked at number ten on South Korea's national Gaon Digital Chart; since its release, it has sold over 1.9 million downloads domestically.

== Background and composition ==
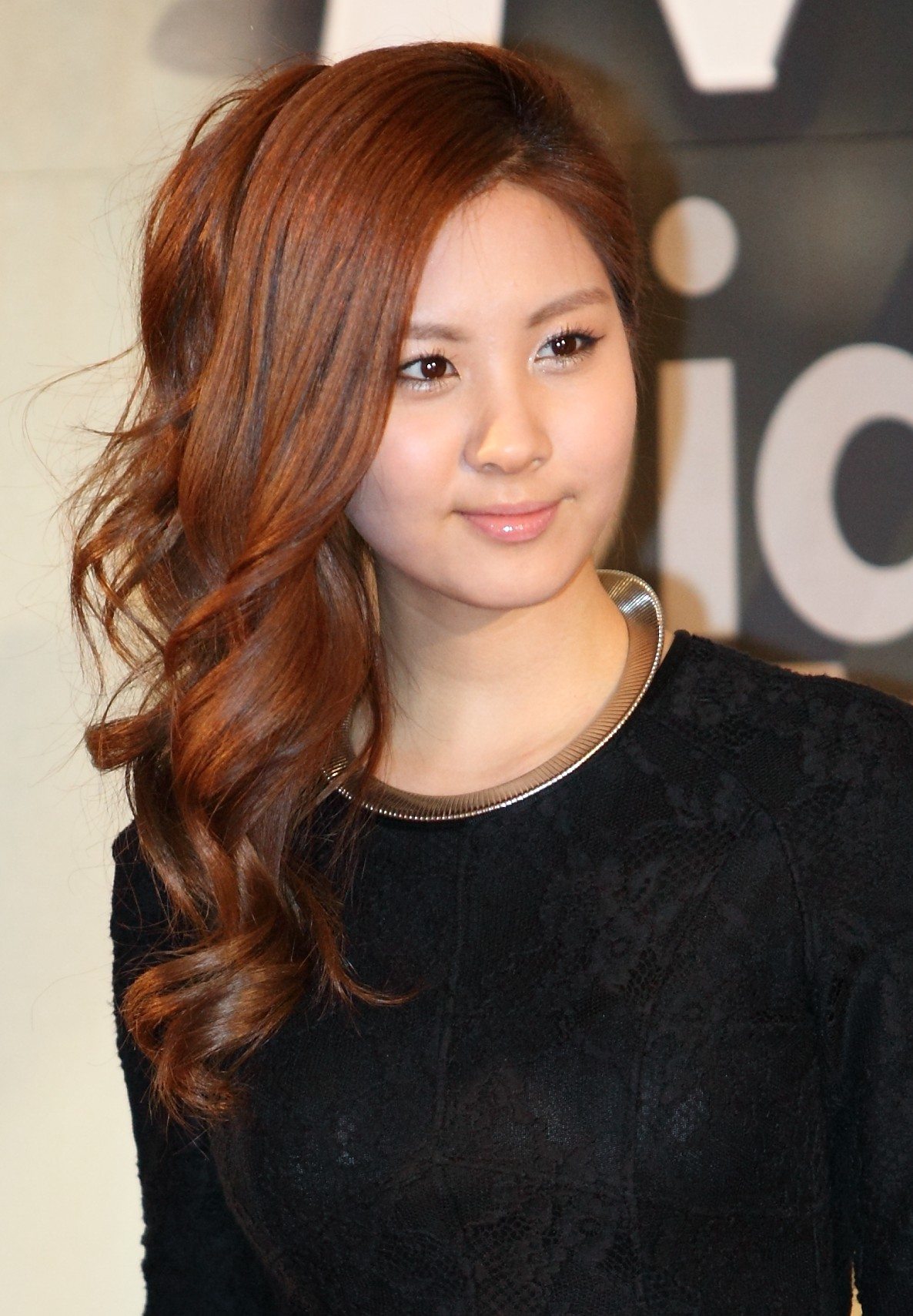
Lyrics for "Love Light" were written after frontman Jung Yong-hwa met Seohyun

Shortly after CNBLUE debuted, main vocalist Jung Yong-hwa was cast for the second season of MBC TV's reality show We Got Married and partnered with Seohyun of Girls' Generation. He began developing the lyrics for "Love Light" after their initial meeting. While penning the track, Jung thought about his first love and compared it to "Love Revolution" from the band's first mini-album Bluetory (2010). The rap section was written with Seohyun in mind.

"Love Light" is a "light-hearted romantic" song. The ballad comprises Jung's and bandmate Lee Jong-hyun's vocals over an acoustic guitar melody. In order for the listener to find the song more endearing, the former intentionally altered the pronunciation of his words to emphasize the feeling. In addition to the lyrics, Jung also composed the track; it is written in the key of D Major and has a tempo of 138 beats per minute.

== Release and promotion ==
Ahead of the release of CNBLUE's second mini-album Bluelove, "Love Light" was made available on online music stores on May 10, 2010. The band performed the single on SBS MTV's music program Inkigayo along with lead single "Love". "Love Light" was performed as a duet with Seohyun at that year's Incheon Hallyu Concert. During a concert stop in midst of the 2014 CNBLUE Live: Can't Stop tour in Singapore, Jung devoted the song to the victims of the sinking of motor vessel Sewol.

== Critical reception and commercial performance ==
Writing for online magazine IZM, So Seung-keun rated "Love Light" half a star out of five, panning the song for the "embarrassing melody aimed at women", its "middle school" lyrics, and "lame" rap. In a separate review for the publication, Lim Yun-hye was disappointed with the track's "simple" and "uninspired" progression.

On the chart dated May 9–15, 2010, "Love Light" debuted and peaked at number ten on South Korea's national Gaon Digital Chart. The single ranked within the top 100 for seventeen consecutive weeks. On Gaon Music Chart's year-end report for 2010, "Love" ranked at number 20 on its list of best-performing singles. It was the fortieth best-selling song in South Korea with 1,955,920 downloads and was ranked at number 54 on the Streaming Chart for accumulating 17,046,303 streams.

== Charts ==
=== Weekly ===
| Chart (2010) | Peak position |
|---|---|
| Gaon Digital Chart | 10 |
| Gaon Bell Chart | 11 |
| Gaon Ring Chart | 3 |

| Chart (2011) | Peak position |
|---|---|
| Gaon Singing Room Chart | 30 |

=== Year-end ===
| Chart (2010) | Peak position |
|---|---|
| Gaon Digital Chart | 37 |
