= Bluelove =

- Bluelove cover

EP by CNBLUE
- Released: May 19, 2010
- Recorded: FNC Entertainment Studio
- Genres: Pop, pop rock
- Length: 20:53
- Language: Korean
- Labels: FNC Entertainment; Warner Music Taiwan
- Producers: Han Seong-ho, Han Seung-hun, Kim Jae-yang

CNBLUE chronology
Thank U (2010)	Bluelove (2010)	First Step (2011)

Singles from Bluelove
- 1. "Love Light" Released: May 10, 2010; 2. "Love" Released: May 19, 2010

Bluelove is the second Korean extended play of South Korean rock band CNBLUE. It was released on May 19, 2010 by FNC Entertainment and distributed by Mnet Media. Before the album was released, "Love Light" was released as the first digital single on May 10, 2010. After it was released "Love" was promoted as the lead single. The album contain five new tracks plus previously released English track, "Let's Go Crazy" from their debut Japanese EP, Now or Never.

The album was released in Taiwan in June 2010 by Warner Music Taiwan in two versions: import limited edition and commemorate edition.

== Promotion and reception ==
Upon release the album took number one spots on various online charts and peaked at number three on South Korean Gaon Album Chart.

They held their comeback stage on MBC Show! Music Core, performing "Love" and "Black Flower". They won first place on Mnet music show M! Countdown on June 10, 2010, Mutizen award on SBS's Inkigayo on June 20 and again on July 4. "Love" placed #20 on KBS Music Bank 2010 Year End K-Chart.

== Track listing ==
No.	Title	Lyrics	Music	Arrangement	Length
1.	"Love"	Han Seong-ho	SEI, KOZI	SEI, KOZI	3:48
2.	"Sweet Holiday"	Han Seong-ho, Kang Min-hyuk	Kim Jae-yang	Kim Jae-yang	3:13
3.	"Black Flower"	Han Seong-ho	Han Seung-hun, Jeon Geun-hwa	Han Seung-hun, Go Jin-young	2:56
4.	"Tattoo"	Jung Yong-hwa	Jung Yong-hwa, Han Seung-hun	Jung Yong-hwa, Han Seung-hun	3:43
5.	"Love Light" (사랑 빛)	Jung Yong-hwa	Jung Yong-hwa	Jung Yong-hwa, Kim Jae-yang	3:13
6.	"Let's Go Crazy" (sung in English)	Shusui, Family Business	Shusui, Family Business	Yoshimiko Chino	4:00
Total length:					20:53

== Release history ==
Country	Date	Distributing label	Format
South Korea	May 10, 2010	FNC Entertainment	digital download ("Love Light")
South Korea	May 19, 2010	FNC Entertainment	CD, digital download
Taiwan	June 9, 2010	Warner Music Taiwan	import limited edition (CD)
Taiwan	June 15, 2010	Warner Music Taiwan	commemorate edition (CD)

== Charts performance ==
Chart	Peak position	
Chart	"Love"	"Love Light"
Gaon Weekly Single Chart	2	10
Gaon Monthly Single Chart (June)	2	16
Gaon Yearly 2010 Top100 Digital Comprehensive Chart	20	37
Gaon Yearly 2010 Top100 Download Chart	15	40
Gaon Yearly 2010 Top100 Streaming Chart	16	54
Gaon Weekly Album Chart	3	
Gaon Weekly Domestic Album chart	3	
Gaon Yearly 2010 Top100 Album Chart	15	

=== Sales ===
Chart	Amount
2010 Gaon physical sales	71,468
2011 Gaon physical sales	29,665
Total Sales (copies)	101,133
