= 7°CN =

EP by CNBLUE
- Released: March 20, 2017
- Studio: FNC Entertainment Studio (Seoul)
- Genre: Pop rock
- Length: 22:49
- Language: Korean
- Label: FNC Entertainment
- Producers: Han Seong-ho (exec.); Jung Yong-hwa; Han Seung-hun; Kim Jae-yang; Kim Chang-rak

CNBLUE chronology
Euphoria (2016)	7°CN (2017)	Stay Gold (2017)

Alternate cover
- Special version cover

Singles from 7°CN
- 1. "Between Us" Released: March 20, 2017

7°CN is the seventh mini-album by South Korean pop-rock idol band CNBLUE. It was released on March 20, 2017, under FNC Entertainment and distributed by LOEN Entertainment. It was also the last Korean release to feature Jonghyun, who left the group in August 2019.

Following a series of photo and video teasers, 7°CN and its lead single "Between Us" were concurrently released. CNBLUE began promoting the record through music chart programs across various television networks by performing the single and other album tracks. The mini-album peaked at number two on South Korea's national Gaon Album Chart, selling over 47,000 copies since its release. The quartet is set to embark on the 2017 CNBLUE Live: Between Us concert tour, a series of shows to take place throughout Asia.

== Background ==
On February 14, 2016, it was announced that CNBLUE was scheduled to release an album the following month. A tentative release date of March 20 was initially reported, but a definitive date had not yet been confirmed. The release date was later confirmed.

The title 7°CN signifies "the story of 'emotions' CNBLUE has felt over the seven years since debut, the varied temperatures of one's feelings in life were welded into music." Recording and mixing for the mini-album took place in Seoul at the FNC Entertainment Studio; it was mastered at the JFS Mastering Studio.

== Music structure ==
A pop-rock record, CNBLUE reimplements components of electronic music into 7°CN as it previously did in its second studio album 2gether (2015). The mini-album explores the themes of "encounters, love, memories, and reality" in its lyrics. "Between Us" is a pop-rock song which conveys the "ambiguous and confusing feelings" leading up to start of a relationship. A pop number accompanied with "brassy funk", "It's You" describes the feelings a man experiences as a result of falling in love. The band showcases a more conventional sound in "Calling You", which sees the narrator "directly approach his love interest". "When I Was Young" is an electronic rock track which delves into reminiscence of the innocence of childhood. A second song harping on CNBLUE's roots, "Manito" an acoustic track which deals with the grief of "unrequited love". Previously included in the band's Japanese album Euphoria, "Royal Rumble" is a "polyrhythmic electronic-acoustic hybrid".

== Artwork concept and packaging ==
7°CN was released in two editions: version A and special. The former comes encased in a sleeve case and hard cover, while the latter is in a paper slipcase. They include a 72-page and 24-page booklet, respectively; both include one random postcard and photocard selfie, as well as a poster.

"What is important to me is to find the link between the music and the visual, it's to connect two senses."

— Pilar Zeta on designing the 7°CN special version artwork

Released on March 27, the artwork for the special edition of 7°CN was designed by Argentinean graphic designer Pilar Zeta. Revolving around the concept of "confusion and [complication]", the cover art depicts portals between a surreal "magical world" filled with stars and pyramids, and a colorful door which "represents the infinite possibilities that there are in the field". It also shows a male figure viewing the door into the other world. The portals indicate how "that contrast opens, this, relationship in between these two worlds". Zeta cited "Between Us" as a vital inspiration for the album artwork.

== Release and promotion ==
On March 13, launching films for each member, as well as a poster for the lead single "Between Us", were released. The following day, "#On" photos of the group and each individual member were unveiled. This was subsequently followed by "#Off" images the day after. A music video teaser for "Between Us" was uploaded on March 16, followed by a highlight medley on the following day. On March 18, a band performance trailer for the lead single was released. Lyric posters of Jung Yong-hwa and Kang Min-hyuk were released on social media websites that same day, as well as lyric posters of Lee Jong-hyun and Lee Jung-shin the subsequent day.

7°CN and the music video for "Between Us" was simultaneously released on March 20. On March 23, CNBLUE began promoting "Between Us" by performing the song on weekly music chart shows. In addition to the lead single, the band also performed "It's You" on Mnet's M Countdown and Korean Broadcasting System's (KBS) Music Bank, and "When I Was Young" Munhwa Broadcasting Corporation's (MBC) Show! Music Core and Seoul Broadcasting System's (SBS) Inkigayo. CNBLUE also performed on SBS MTV's The Show and MBC Music's Show Champion.

In order to promote the record, the band will embark on the 2017 CNBLUE Live: Between Us concert tour. It is the band's first tour since promoting 2gether through the 2015 CNBLUE Live: Come Together tour. The initial pair of shows will take place between June 3–4 at the SK Olympic Handball Gymnasium in Seoul. From July to September, CNBLUE will make stops in Singapore, Manila, Jakarta, Bangkok, Hong Kong, and Taipei.

== Critical reception ==
Writing for online magazine IZM, Jung Min-jae rated 7°CN three out of five stars, noting that CNBLUE's musical progress had developed rapidly upon the band "[overtaking] the helm". He observed that the quartet "produce much slicker materials in terms of melody progression, sound structure, and performance" and the "melodies, arrangements, vocals, and instrumentals fit together to a tee", asserting that the band is "now entering the stage of building its own realm". However, he expressed that CNBLUE's mini-albums "tend to have similar tinges", citing the repetitiveness of the "composing styles and themes of title-tracks, as well as repetition of patterned b-sides give listeners a feeling of déjà vu". He felt that the record was "quite an uneventful series of listens" in spite of its quality. Billboard magazine columnist Tamar Herman labeled it "one of [CNBLUE's] most innovative album in years". With its "genre-blending tracks", she noted that the record was able to "showcase the group's ability to combine rock music with K-pop's experiment nature".

7°CN earned the band a nomination for the Golden Disc Album Award at the 32nd Golden Disc Awards.

== Commercial performance ==
On the chart dated March 19–25, 2017, 7°CN debuted at number three on South Korea's national Gaon Album Chart. In its second week, the mini-album rose to its peak at number two. By the end of 2017, it sold 53,559 copies domestically. The mini-album ranked at number eight on Billboard magazine's World Albums Chart. In Japan, the mini-album debuted at number 33 on the weekly Oricon Albums Chart, selling 2,972 copies in its first week. It spent a second consecutive week at its peak, selling an additional 2,549 copies. It has sold 7,408 copies in the country since its release.

== Track listing ==
Track listing
No.	Title	Lyrics	Music	Arrangement	Length
1.	"Between Us" (헷갈리게; Hetgallige)	Jung Yong-hwa, Hang Seong-ho, Kim I-na	Jung Yong-hwa, Justin Reinstein	Justin Reinstein	3:31
2.	"It's You"	Jung Yong-hwa, Justin Reinstein	Jung Yong-hwa, Justin Reinstein	Justin Reinstein	3:32
3.	"Calling You" (끊지마; Kkeunhjima)	Lee Jong-hyun	Lee Jong-hyun, Kim Chang-rak	Lee Jong-hyun, Kim Chang-rak, Jo Se-hee	3:10
4.	"When I Was Young"	Lee Jong-hyun	Lee Jong-hyun, Kim Chang-rak	Lee Jong-hyun, Kim Chang-rak, Choi Jin-ho, Jo Se-hee	3:22
5.	"Manito" (마니또; Manitto)	Lee Jung-shin, Jung Yong-hwa	Lee Jung-shin, Han Seung-hoon, Ko Jin-yeong	Ko Jin-yeong	4:05
6.	"Royal Rumble"	Jung Yong-hwa, miwa	Jung Yong-hwa	Noriyuki Inoue (Jizue)	5:09
Total length:					22:49

== Personnel ==
Credits adapted from the album's liner notes.

- CNBLUE – background vocals
  - Jung Yong-hwa – record producer, lyricist, composer, guitar
  - Kang Min-hyuk – drums
  - Lee Jong-hyun – guitar, lyricist, composer, arranger
  - Lee Jung-shin – bass, lyricist, composer
- Bae Hun-jik – recording engineer
- Choi Eun-jeong – artist management
- Choi Jin-ho – arranger
- Choi Yu-jin – contents planning, marketing
- Choi Yun-jin – A&R, publishing
- Han Seong-ho – executive producer
- Han Seung-hoon – producer, composer
- Hong Ji-su – artist management
- Im Ji-yeon – A&R, media planning
- Jang Ae-ri – media planning
- Jang Bit-na – assistant stylist
- Jeon Geun-hwa – background vocals
- Jo Se-hee – arranger, piano
- Jo Seong-wan – supervisor
- Jung Bo-yeong – makeup
- Jung Eun-bi – international business
- Jung Eun-gyeong – customer relationship management
- Jung Go-eun – customer relationship management
- Jung Jae-pil – guitar
- Jung Yu-jin – customer relationship management
- Justin Reinstein – lyricist, composer, arranger
- Kang Jong-hyeok – artist management
- Kim Chang-rak – producer, composer, arranger
- Kim Hang-a – design
- Kim Hye-rim – artist management
- Kim I-na – lyricist
- Kim Jae-ho – A&R
- Kim Jae-yang – producer
- Kim Ji-hye – contents planning, marketing
- Kim Ji-yu – customer relationship management
- Kim Ji-yun – design
- Kim Na-yeon – visual communication
- Kim Seong-han – contents planning, marketing
- Kim Tae-hyeok – artist management
- Kim Yeong-seon – contents planning, marketing
- Kim Yong-seup – media planning
- Kim Yong-won – artist management
- Kim Yu-jin – customer relationship management, design
- Ko Jin-young – composer, arranger, bass
- Kwon Nam-woo – mastering engineer
- Kwon Woo-mi – A&R
- Lee Ga-yeong – international business
- Lee Hae-yeong – publishing
- Lee Hye-yeong – stylist
- Lee Ji-yeong – media planning
- Lee Jeong-woo – bass
- Lee Seung-ho – artist management
- Lee Yu-jin – mixing engineer
- Lin Won – international business
- Ma Se-bin – international business
- miwa – lyricist
- Mok Jeong-wook – photography
- No Hyeong-gyu – artist management
- Noriyuki Inoue (Jizue) – arranger
- Oh Ji-eun – customer relationship management
- Park Jeong-min – recording engineer, mixing engineer
- Park Mi-hyeong – hair
- Park Sang-hyeon – artist management
- Pilar Zeta – art direction, design
- Pyo Jin-hee – customer relationship management
- Ryu Min-a – MCs
- Seo Seok-bin – visual communication
- Seon Se-mi – contents planning, marketing
- Seong Jong-jin – artist management
- Seong Sang-hyeon – international business
- Song Yun-ho – MCs
- Shim Hye-jin – contents planning, marketing
- Woo Hyeon-sik – artist management
- Yang Hee-won – artist management
- Yeo Hwan-gu – artist management
- Yoo Seong-yeong – international business
- Yoo Sun-ho – media planning
- Yoon Hye-jin – design
- Yoon Je-yun – artist management

== Charts ==
Chart (2017)	Peak position
Billboard World Albums Chart	8
Gaon Album Chart	2
Oricon Albums Chart	33

== Sales ==
Region	Sales
Japan (Oricon)	7,408+
South Korea (Gaon)	53,559+

== Release history ==
List of release dates, showing region, edition, formats, label, and reference
Region	Date	Edition(s)	Format(s)	Label	Ref.
South Korea	March 20, 2017	Standard	CD	FNC; LOEN	
Various	March 20, 2017	Standard	Digital download	FNC; LOEN	
South Korea	March 27, 2017	Special edition	CD	FNC; LOEN	
