= Love (CNBLUE song) =

CNBLUE song

Single by CNBLUE

from the album Bluelove
- Released: May 19, 2010
- Recorded: 2010
- Genre: Modern rock
- Length: 3:47
- Label: FNC
- Songwriters: Han Seong-ho, Kim Do-hoon, Lee Sang-ho

CNBLUE singles chronology
"Love Light" (2010)	"Love" (2010)	"Intuition" (2011)

"Love" is a song recorded by South Korean rock band CNBLUE. It is the lead single to the band's second mini-album Bluelove. Written by Han Seong-ho, Kim Do-hoon, and Lee Sang-ho, the modern rock number was released by FNC Entertainment and distributed by Kakao M on May 19, 2010. The song peaked at number two on South Korea's national Gaon Digital Chart; since its release, it has sold over 2.4 million downloads domestically. "Love" scored the band three music show awards: one from Mnet's M Countdown and two through SBS MTV's Inkigayo. It also earned the Digital Music Bonsang at the 25th Golden Disc Awards.

== Composition ==
"Love" is a modern rock track which comprises a shuffle rhythm on acoustic and electric guitars. Main vocalist Jung Yong-hwa incorporates a rap in the second verse over a metal-like section. He felt that the song has a "fresh feeling" with a metallic twist. Songwriters Han Seong-ho, Kim Do-hoon, and Lee Sang-ho provided the track's lyrics and composition, which is written in the key of C Major and has a tempo of 100 beats per minute.

== Release and promotion ==
A week ahead of its release, FNC Entertainment uploaded a music video teaser for "Love". The single was made available on online music stores on May 19, 2010. The music video begins with CNBLUE arriving at a dark-lit live bar filled with lethargic patrons. The band performs on stage, which energizes the crowd. The day after the single's release, CNBLUE began promoting it by performing it on weekly music chart shows beginning with Mnet's M Countdown. They made additional performances on KBS2's Music Bank, Munhwa Broadcasting Corporation's (MBC) Show! Music Core, and SBS MTV's Inkigayo.

== Commercial performance ==
On the chart dated May 16–22, 2010, "Love" debuted at number 22 on South Korea's national Gaon Digital Chart. The following week, it ranked at number two. The single remained at its peak for three nonconsecutive frames and ranked within the top 100 for sixteen weeks. On Gaon Music Chart's year-end report for 2010, "Love" ranked at number 20 on its list of best-performing singles. It was the fifteenth best-selling song in South Korea with 2,455,117 downloads and ranked at number ten on the Streaming Chart for accumulating 22,685,321 streams.

== Accolades ==
On the June 10 broadcast of M! Countdown, "Love" ranked number one on the program's music chart and earned its first music show win. It also earned the Mutizen Song Award on Inkigayo for two consecutive weeks. "Love" was awarded the Digital Music Bonsang at the 25th Golden Disc Awards. The song received further nominations for Best Band Performance at the 2010 Mnet Asian Music Awards and Song of the Year at the 2nd Melon Music Awards.

== Charts ==
=== Weekly ===
Chart (2010)	Peak position
Gaon Digital Chart	2
Gaon Bell Chart	1
Gaon Ring Chart	8

Chart (2011)	Peak position
Gaon Singing Room Chart	78

=== Year-end ===
Chart (2010)	Peak position
Gaon Digital Chart	20
