= Between Us (CNBLUE song) =

Single by CNBLUE

from the album 7°CN
- Released: March 20, 2017
- Genre: Pop rock, synth rock
- Length: 3:31
- Label: FNC Entertainment
- Songwriters: Jung Yong-hwa, Hang Seong-ho, Kim I-na, Justin Reinstein

CNBLUE singles chronology
"Glory Days" (2016)	"Between Us" (2017)	"Shake" (2017)

"Between Us" (헷갈리게; Hetgallige) is a song by South Korean pop rock idol band CNBLUE. It serves as the lead single to the band's seventh mini-album 7°CN and was released on March 20, 2017.

== Background and composition ==
"Between Us" was written by Jung Yong-hwa, Hang Seong-ho, and Kim I-na, and composed by Jung and Justin Reinstein. It is composed in the key of E major using common time with a tempo of 140 beats per minute. Jung and Reinstein met while attending a song camp; originally titled "Wasted", the pair composed the track together.

Musically, "Between Us" is a pop-rock and synth rock song. The lyrics deal with the "ambiguous and confusing feelings" leading up to start of a relationship. The song begins with a "light" and "upbeat rhythm", building into its "catchy" chorus of "syncopated rhythms" and a "strong rock sound". Jung showcases "tough and masculine vocals" on the track. Billboard magazine columnist Tamar Herman described it as a "propulsive fusion of rock 'n' roll and Top 40 dance music".

== Release and promotion ==
"Between Us" was simultaneously released alongside 7°CN on March 20, 2017. CNBLUE began promoting the song three days later on Mnet's music chart show M Countdown, followed by subsequent comeback performances on Korean Broadcasting System's (KBS) Music Bank, Munhwa Broadcasting Corporation's (MBC) Show! Music Core, Seoul Broadcasting System's (SBS) Inkigayo, SBS M's The Show, and MBC M's Show Champion.

== Music video ==
A music video teaser for "Between Us" was released on March 16. Two days later, a band performance trailer for the single was released. The full music video was released on March 20. It shows CNBLUE performing together throughout, as well as the members individually "walking on a dark path while talking on their phone". The scenes shift between black-and-white and colored sequences, an "outward expression of the internal turmoil a person faces when figuring out what exactly is going on at the start of burgeoning relationship". Filmed on March 6, the video was directed by Jung Jin-su of Visuals From.

== Commercial performance ==
"Between Us" debuted at number 33 on South Korea's national Gaon Digital Chart, selling 44,833 downloads and accumulating 747,105 streams in its first week. The song earned CNBLUE award nominations for Best Band Performance and Song of the Year at the 2017 Mnet Asian Music Awards.

== Charts ==
Chart (2017)	Peak position
Gaon Digital Chart	33
Gaon Mobile Chart	65
