= You're So Fine (CNBLUE song) =

Single by CNBLUE

from the album Blueming
- Released: April 4, 2016
- Recorded: 2015–16
- Genre: Pop rock
- Length: 3:52
- Label: FNC Entertainment
- Songwriter: Jung Yong-hwa

CNBLUE singles chronology
"Supernova" (2015)	"You're So Fine" (2016)	"Puzzle" (2016)

"You're So Fine" (Korean: 이렇게 예뻤나; RR: Ireoke yeppeonna) is a song by South Korean pop rock band CNBLUE. It is the lead single to the band's sixth EP Blueming and was released on April 4, 2016.

== Composition ==
"You're So Fine" is an "upbeat" pop rock track. The song was written and composed by vocalist Jung Yong-hwa, and is composed in the key of A♭ major using common time with a tempo of 118 beats per minute. Jung began working on the song while conceiving "Cinderella"; the song lyrics were written in 2016. In crafting the lyrics, Jung paid special attention to detail in order to capture "the warm feeling of brass" in order to portray his personality. He was inspired by the title of a news article which read "Was she this pretty?" to write the song. He felt that it "sounded very nice" when he sang the phrase, which emitted a "warm feeling".

== Release and promotion ==
"You're So Fine" was simultaneously released alongside Blueming on April 4, 2016. CNBLUE began promoting the song on three days later on Mnet's music chart show M Countdown, followed by subsequent comeback performances on Korean Broadcasting System's (KBS) Music Bank, Munhwa Broadcasting Corporation's (MBC) Show! Music Core, Seoul Broadcasting System's (SBS) Inkigayo, SBS MTV's The Show, and MBC Music's Show Champion. On April 12, "You're So Fine" earned its first music show win on The Show. It was followed by back-to-back wins on Show Champion, M Countdown, and Music Bank on the subsequent days. It went on to earn second consecutive wins on both The Show and Music Bank, earning a total of six music show wins. CNBLUE also performed the song during the Show! Music Core special 2016 Incheon Sky Festival.

== Music video ==
Two music video teasers were released on March 31 and April 3, respectively. The full music video was released on the following day. Produced by Surplus X Production and directed by Lee HJ, it stars CNBLUE and actress Jung Hye-sung.

== Critical reception ==
Writing for Fuse, columnist Jeff Benjamin compared CNBLUE's musical expansion to that of American band Maroon 5. Describing "You're So Fine" as a "disco-tinged" song, he noted that the band integrates "feel-good brass and horns" in which Jung's vocals "fits... like a glove". Benjamin pointed out at the "soulful sound" was already present in K-pop, but expressed that "CNBLUE finds a way to make it sound fresh compared to its contemporaries". He also highlighted similarities with "Hold My Hand" from the band's previous album 2gether (2015). Critic Kim Ji-ha of TV Daily expressed surprise that CNBLUE returned "with a sweet" song.

"You're So Fine" earned CNBLUE a nomination for Best Rock Song at the 2016 Melon Music Awards. It earned the Best Band Performance award at the 2016 Mnet Asian Music Awards, where it was also nominated for Song of the Year.

== Commercial performance ==
"You're So Fine" debuted at number 19 on the Gaon Digital Chart, selling 101,215 downloads and accumulating 1,553,112 streams in its first week. By the end of April, the song sold 200,056 downloads and accumulated 4,781,408 streams.

== Charts ==
Chart (2016)	Peak position
Gaon Digital Chart	19
