= Remember That (BtoB song) =

Single by BtoB

from the album Remember That
- Released: March 27, 2016
- Genre: K-pop; Ballad
- Length: 4:05
- Label: Cube Entertainment

BtoB singles chronology
""Be My Bride (Japanese version)" (2016)	"Remember That" (2016)

"Remember That" is a song by South Korean boy band BtoB from their eighth extended play of the same name. It was released a day early of the EP's release, accompanied with its official music video.

Cube Entertainment began releasing teasers of the members by March 2016. The song was an all-in-all success and had earned them their first win in Show Champion and other music shows since their debut. Weighed cumulative sales of the song was around 241, 733+ according to Gaon Music Chart.

== Track listing ==
No.	Title	Length
1.	"Remember That"	4:05
Total length:		4:05

== Chart performance ==
Chart	Peak position
Gaon Weekly singles chart	11
