= I'm a Loner =

Single by CNBLUE

from the album Bluetory
- Released: January 14, 2010
- Genre: Funk rock
- Length: 3:39
- Label: FNC
- Songwriters: Han Seong-ho, Amen, Kim Do-hoon, Lee Sang-ho

CNBLUE singles chronology
"I'm a Loner" (2010)	"Love Light" (2010)

"I'm a Loner" (외톨이야; Oetoriya) is a song by South Korean pop-rock idol band CNBLUE. It is the debut and lead single to the band's first mini-album Bluetory. Written by Han Seong-ho and Amen, the funk-rock track was released under FNC Music on January 14, 2010. Upon its release, CNBLUE achieved immediate commercial success; the song earned the band its first two music show wins on Korean Broadcasting System's (KBS) Music Bank and Seoul Broadcasting System's (SBS) Inkigayo. Unprecedented at the time, CNBLUE held the record for shortest period between debuting and earning a music show win for four and a half years. The song also peaked at number two on the Gaon Digital Chart.

The composers Kim Do-hoon and Lee Sang-ho faced a lawsuit filed by indie rock band Ynot? two months after the release of "I'm a Loner". The band accused the two of plagiarizing one of its songs; a judge would later dismiss the charges.

== Composition ==
"I'm a Loner" is classified as a funk-rock track. The song was written by Han Seong-ho and Amen, and composed and arranged by Kim Do-hoon and Lee Sang-ho; it is composed in the key of D minor using common time with a tempo of 105 beats per minute. Writing for Newsen, reporter Cha Yeon described the track as a "modern funk-rock song" with an "addictive" and "strong" melody. She noted that the guitar riffs and chord progression produced a "refined charm", which offered an alternative to the hook songs of other idol groups at the time.

== Release and promotion ==
"I'm a Loner" was made available on online music stores on January 14, 2010. The following day, CNBLUE began promoting the song by performing it on weekly music chart shows, beginning with KBS' Music Bank and following with SBS' Inkigayo. On the January 29 broadcast of Music Bank, "I'm a Loner" ranked number one on the program's music chart and earned the band its first music show win. CNBLUE won the Mutizen Song award on Inkigayo two days later, the band's second and final win. At the time, CNBLUE's win two weeks into its debut was unprecedented. It held the record for shortest amount of time to win a music show award from debut until Winner won its first music show with "Empty" on August 17, 2014, five days into its debut.

== Commercial performance ==
On the chart dated January 10–16, 2010, "I'm a Loner" debuted at number five on the Gaon Digital Chart. The following week, it rose to its peak at number two. "I'm a Loner" ranked at number 31 on the 2010 Comprehensive Digital Top 100 chart. By the end of the year, it was the eighth best-selling song in South Korea with 2,959,800 digital downloads and ranked at number ten on the Streaming Chart for accumulating 27,564,498 streams.

== Plagiarism lawsuit ==
In March 2010, indie rock band Ynot? filed a civil lawsuit against Kim Do-hoon and Lee Sang-ho. In "I'm a Loner", the band accused the songwriters of plagiarizing "Bluebird" from its mini-album GreenApple (2008); Ynot? reportedly asked for ₩50 million in compensation. Kim and Lee denied the accusations and stated, "only one bar... is similar, but the chord progression is different, the intro part is not at all similar and main chorus melody 'Alone, alone' is completely different." Rock musician Shin Hae-chul wrote a scathing post in response to the plagiarism accusations, saying, "If the song is not plagiarism, plagiarism will disappear in the world." He continued by criticizing the idol band, stating, "If CNBLUE is an indie band, a fly is a bird. If it's a real band, I will retire." In April 2011, a court found in favor of the songwriters and dismissed the charges of plagiarism.

== Charts ==
=== Weekly ===
Chart (2010–16)	Peak position
South Korea (Gaon Digital Chart)	2
South Korea (Gaon Mobile Chart)	1
South Korea (Gaon Noraebang Chart)	95

=== Year-end ===
Chart (2010)	Peak position
South Korea (Gaon Digital Chart)	31

== Cover versions ==
"I'm a Loner" was covered by R&B singer Kim Bum-soo on the July 10, 2011 broadcast of MBC's singing competition program I Am a Singer. His version debuted and peaked at number 22 on the Gaon Digital Chart dated July 10–16, 2011. It went on to sell 632,941 digital downloads by the end of the year. Musical theatre actor Kang Dong-ho covered the song, which was re-titled to "I'm a Loner (A Train to the World)", on the March 6, 2016 episode of King of Mask Singer.

=== Charts ===
==== Weekly ====
Chart (2011)	Peak position
Gaon Digital Chart	22

==== Year-end ====
Chart (2011)	Peak position
Gaon Download Chart	377
