= Cinderella (CNBLUE song) =

- Chinese version cover

Single by CNBLUE

from the album 2gether
- Released: September 14, 2015
- Recorded: 2015
- Genre: Electronic rock
- Length: 3:21
- Label: FNC Entertainment
- Songwriter: Jung Yong-hwa

CNBLUE singles chronology
"Can't Stop" (2014)	"Cinderella" (2015)

"Cinderella (신데렐라; Shinderella)" is a song by South Korean rock band CNBLUE. It is the lead single to the band's second studio album 2gether and was released on September 14, 2015.

== Composition ==
"Cinderella" is a pop rock song that incorporates disco and elements of electronic music. The song was written and composed by vocalist Jung Yong-hwa, and is composed in the key of A minor using common time with a tempo of 120 beats per minute. Beginning with "warped vocals, zipping synths, and booming drum machines", the song consists of a "funky guitar riff", a "dreamy synth", and beats that "lead into a danceable atmosphere." It builds up into the "explosive chorus", coupled with its catchy hook. "Cinderella" serves as a take on the European folktale of the same name with "trendy sounds" and "modern sensibilities". The song was conceived when Jung Yong-hwa was sitting on a sofa in his recording studio when the name Cinderella popped into his head. He initially dubbed it an "interesting keyword", but came across it two days later in an article about women longing to live like the character. With a "gut feeling", he felt that it was "destiny" to write a song about it.

== Release and promotion ==
"Cinderella" was simultaneously released alongside 2gether on September 14, 2015. CNBLUE began promoting the song on three days later on Mnet's music chart show M Countdown, followed by subsequent comeback performances on Korean Broadcasting System's (KBS) Music Bank, Munhwa Broadcasting Corporation's (MBC) Show! Music Core, Seoul Broadcasting System's (SBS) Inkigayo, SBS MTV's The Show, and MBC Music's Show Champion on the following days. "Cinderella" earned its first music show win on the September 22 broadcast of The Show, followed by their second win on Show Champion the day after. The song earned the band its third win on Music Bank that same week, which was not aired due to the Chuseok holiday. CNBLUE earned two consecutive wins on The Show and Music Bank a week later; "Cinderella" ultimately earned the band five music show wins.

CNBLUE recorded a Mandarin Chinese-language version of "Cinderella", the first time the band has sung in the language. It is being used as the theme song for the action comedy film Bad Guys Always Die and is included in its soundtrack. The song was premiered at the film's soundtrack release event on September 21 and made available on the following day. "Cinderella" earned CNBLUE nominations for Best Band Performance and Song of the Year at the 2015 Mnet Asian Music Awards. The band went on to win the former.

== Music video ==
A 26-second music video teaser for "Cinderella" was first released on September 11. The full music video was released three days later, which stars CNBLUE and actress Seo Yi-an. The band met the actress on the day the music video was filmed and they each had to create intimate scenes with the heroine. Guitarist Lee Jong-hyun was instructed by the director to pose in a manner of leaning in to kiss her. He expressed that the act had made him nervous. The video is similarly themed to the story of Cinderella; the band members all meet the same girl who later vanishes, leaving behind only a jeweled heel.

== Critical reception ==
"Cinderella" was met with generally favorable reviews from music critics. Columnist Jeff Benjamin of Billboard magazine compared the song to Maroon 5's "Moves like Jagger". He noted that, while little separates the song from other K-pop boy bands on first impression, there is "poignant live guitar and drums" on the track. Jeon Won of MyDaily described the song as possessing "a different color" from CNBLUE's usual sound, but believed it was a "good representation" of their musical identity. Music critic Kim Young-dae expressed his surprise in the "simple and light organization" of the song, pointing out the characterization of Jung Yong-hwa's previous compositions, which tended to "build the emotions in the beginning and pour them out resolutely toward the end".

Rating "Cinderella" three out of five stars, writer Hwang Sun-up of online magazine IZM expressed that it was "definitely a neatly arranged, well-made pop rock" track, highlighting Jung Yong-hwa's growth as a "good songwriter". However, he felt that the development of the song was "flat" and "bland". Due to the features of electronic music in the song, the presence of the remaining band members' instruments diminished, "which doesn't show the synergy as a team". In the album review for 2gether by the same publication, Jung Min-jae noted that the song "doesn't seem far from CNBLUE's past music at first glance", but pointed out the "denser structure and sound which reveals a definitely evolved sense of appeal". Writing for Malaysian newspaper Sin Chew Daily, Cao Jiefeng called the song "charming and free" despite its electronic elements, noting that the disco funk arrangement of the beat was "quite seducing". He also complimented the filter echo effects used in the song, making the music "twice as sexy". He cited similarities between Maroon 5 songs "Move like Jagger" and parts of "Sugar".

== Commercial performance ==
"Cinderella" debuted at number 10 on the Gaon Digital Chart, selling 103,603 downloads and accumulating 1,751,966 streams in its first week.

== Charts ==
Chart (2015)	Peak position
Gaon Digital Chart	10
