= WJSN discography =

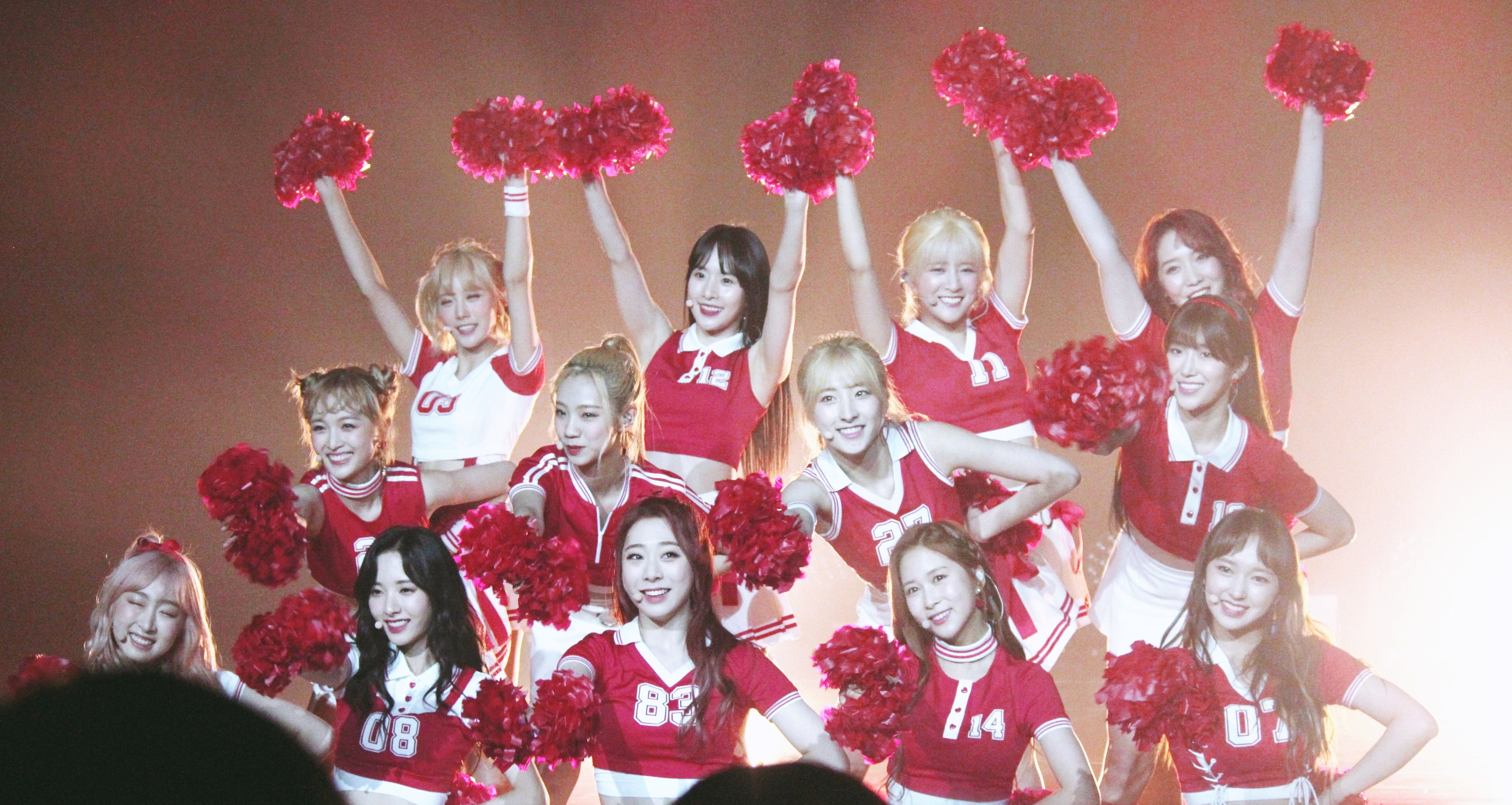
- WJSN performing "Happy" on June 7, 2017
- Studio albums: 1
- EPs: 10
- Singles: 14
- Single albums: 1
- Collaborations: 5

South Korean girl group WJSN, also known as Cosmic Girls, have released one studio album, ten extended plays, one single album, fourteen digital singles and they have also participated in five collaboration songs.

== Studio albums ==
List of studio albums, with selected details, chart positions and sales
Title	Details	Peak chart positions	Sales
Title	Details	KOR	Sales
Happy Moment	Released: June 7, 2017; Label: Starship Entertainment; Formats: CD, digital download	3	KOR: 38,368

== Extended plays ==
List of extended plays, with selected chart positions and sales
Title	Details	Peak chart positions			Sales
Title	Details	KOR	JPN	US World	Sales
Would You Like?	Released: February 25, 2016; Label: Starship Entertainment; Format: CD, digital download	7	—	—	KOR: 13,787
The Secret	Released: August 17, 2016; Label: Starship Entertainment; Format: CD, digital download	6	—	12	KOR: 19,090
From. WJSN	Released: January 4, 2017; Label: Starship Entertainment; Format: CD, digital download	4	—	—	KOR: 36,441; JPN: 509
Dream Your Dream	Released: February 27, 2018; Label: Starship Entertainment; Format: CD, digital download	2	—	—	KOR: 49,002
WJ Please?	Released: September 19, 2018; Label: Starship Entertainment; Format: CD, digital download	3	—	14	KOR: 61,952
WJ Stay?	Released: January 8, 2019; Label: Starship Entertainment; Format: CD, digital download	2	—	—	KOR: 64,339
For the Summer	Released: June 4, 2019; Label: Starship Entertainment; Format: CD, digital download	1	—	—	KOR: 78,555
As You Wish	Released: November 19, 2019; Label: Starship Entertainment; Format: CD, digital download	2	—	—	KOR: 96,647
Neverland	Released: June 9, 2020; Label: Starship Entertainment; Format: CD, digital download	2	45	—	KOR: 105,056; JPN: 715
Unnatural	Released: March 31, 2021; Label: Starship Entertainment; Format: CD, digital download	3	43	—	KOR: 92,645
"—" denotes releases that did not chart or were not released in that region.

== Single albums ==
List of single albums, with selected chart positions and sales
Title	Details	Peak chart positions	Sales
Title	Details	KOR	Sales
Sequence	Released: July 5, 2022; Label: Starship Entertainment; Format: CD, digital download	4	KOR: 196,468
WJSN Chocome
Hmph!	Released: October 7, 2020; Label: Starship Entertainment; Format: CD, digital download; Track listing: 1. "Hmph!" (흥칫뿡); 2. "Ya Ya Ya" (야야야)	5	KOR: 25,595
Super Yuppers!	Released: January 5, 2022; Label: Starship Entertainment; Format: CD, digital download; Track listing: 1. "Super Yuppers!" (슈퍼 그럼요); 2. "Sweetie" (쪼꼬우유)	8	KOR: 29,598
WJSN The Black
My Attitude	Released: May 12, 2021; Label: Starship Entertainment; Format: CD, digital download; Track listing: 1. "Easy"; 2. "Kiss Your Lips"	6	KOR: 73,925

== Singles ==
Title	Year	Peak chart positions		Sales	Album
Title	Year	KOR Circle	KOR Billb.	Sales	Album
"Mo Mo Mo" (모모모)	2016	—	—N/a	KOR: 14,523	Would You Like?
"Catch Me"	2016	—	—N/a	—N/a	Would You Like?
"Secret" (비밀이야)	2016	49	—N/a	KOR: 89,219	The Secret
"I Wish" (너에게 닿기를)	2017	49	—N/a	KOR: 166,115	From. WJSN
"Happy"	2017	77	—N/a	KOR: 45,435	Happy Moment
"Dreams Come True" (꿈꾸는 마음으로)	2018	— (Note: "Dreams Come True" did not enter on the Gaon Digital Chart, but debuted and peaked at number 23 on the Gaon Download Chart.)	67	—N/a	Dream Your Dream
"Save Me, Save You" (부탁해)	2018	— (Note: "Save Me, Save You" did not enter on the Gaon Digital Chart, but debuted and peaked at number 21 on the Gaon Download Chart.)	63	—N/a	WJ Please?
"La La Love"	2019	101	51	—N/a	WJ Stay?
"Boogie Up"	2019	133	60	—N/a	For the Summer
"As You Wish" (이루리)	2019	93	67	—N/a	As You Wish
"Butterfly"	2020	118	81	—N/a	Neverland
"Unnatural"	2021	126	85	—N/a	Unnatural
"Last Sequence"	2022	132	—	—N/a	Sequence
"Bloom Hour"	2026	— (Note: "Bloom Hour" did not enter the Circle Digital Chart, but debuted and peaked at number 27 on the Circle Download Chart.)	—	—N/a	Non-album single
WJSN Chocome
"Hmph!" (흥칫뿡)	2020	— (Note: "Hmph!" did not enter on the Gaon Digital Chart, but debuted and peaked at number 70 on the Gaon Download Chart.)	—	—N/a	Hmph!
"Super Yuppers!" (슈퍼 그럼요)	2022	— (Note: "Super Yuppers!" did not enter on the Gaon Digital Chart, but debuted and peaked at number 36 on the Gaon Download Chart.)	—	—N/a	Super Yuppers!
WJSN The Black
"Easy"	2021	— (Note: "Easy" did not enter on the Gaon Digital Chart, but debuted and peaked at number 39 on the Gaon Download Chart.)	—	—N/a	My Attitude
"—" denotes releases that did not chart or were not released in that region.

=== Promotional singles ===
Title	Year	Album
"Kiss Me" (키스 미)	2017	Non-album singles
"Let Me In" (너의 세계로) (Note: "Let Me In" was released as a promotional single in collaboration with Universe.)	2021	Non-album singles
"Aura" (영기)	2022	Sequence

== Collaborations ==
Title	Year	Artist	Album
"Do Better" (두 베러)	2016	Y Teen (WJSN and Monsta X)	Non-album singles
"Christmas Day" (크리스마스데이)	2017	Starship Planet	Non-album singles
"Strong" (짜릿하게)	2018	WJMK (WJSN and Weki Meki)	Non-album singles
"Christmas Time" (벌써 크리스마스)	2018	Starship Planet	Non-album singles
"It's a Good Time" (Korean Version)	2018	WJSN and Mickey Mouse	Non-album singles

== Videography ==
=== Music videos ===
Title	Year	Director(s)	Notes	Ref.
"Mo Mo Mo" (모모모)	2016	Hong Won-Ki (Zanybros)	—N/a	—N/a
"Catch Me" (캐치미)	2016	Hong Won-Ki (Zanybros)	—N/a	—N/a
"Secret" (비밀이야)	2016	FantazyLab	First music video with member Yeonjung	
"I Wish" (너에게 닿기를)	2017	FantazyLab	—N/a	
"Happy"	2017	FantazyLab	—N/a	—N/a
"Kiss Me" (키스 미)	2017	Unknown	CF collaboration with "Kiss Me Cosmetics"	—N/a
"Dreams Come True" (꿈꾸는 마음으로)	2018	FantazyLab	—N/a	
"Save Me, Save You" (부탁해)	2018	Vikings League	Without Chinese members	
"It's a Good Time" (Korean Version)	2018	JIMMY (VIA)	Collaboration with Mickey Mouse for the character's 90th birthday	—N/a
"La La Love"	2019	Vikings League	Without Chinese members	
"Boogie Up"	2019	Hong Won-Ki (Zanybros)	Without Chinese members	
"As You Wish" (이루리)	2019	Vikings League	Without Chinese members	
"Butterfly"	2020	HIGHQUALITYFISH	Without Chinese members	
"Hmph!" (흥칫뿡)	2020	Hong Won-Ki (Zanybros)	WJSN Chocome	
"Unnatural"	2021	Vikings League	Without Chinese members	
"Easy"	2021	VIA Production	WJSN The Black	
"Let Me In"	2021	SUNNY VISUAL	Launched in partnership with Universe Music company	
"Super Yuppers!" (슈퍼 그럼요)	2022	Vikings League	WJSN Chocome	
"Last Sequence"	2022	Kim Namsuk (SEGAJI)	Without Chinese members	
"Bloom Hour"	2026	Choi Youngji (Pinklabel Visual)	10th Anniversary Comeback	
