= Exy =

South Korean singer, rapper and actress (born 1995)

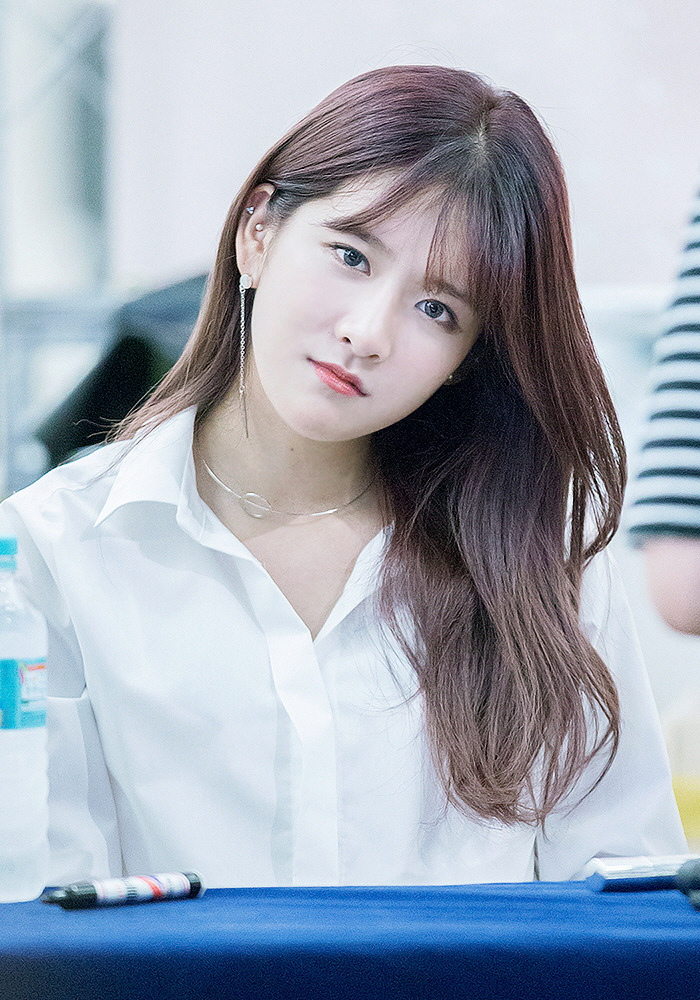
- Exy in August 2016
- Born: Chu So-jung; November 6, 1995 (age 30); Busan, South Korea
- Education: Dongduk Women's University
- Occupations: Singer; songwriter; rapper; actress
- Musical career
- Genres: K-pop; hip-hop
- Instrument: Vocals
- Years active: 2015–present
- Labels: Starship; Yuehua
- Member of: WJSN; WJSN The Black
- Formerly of: Y-Teen

Korean name
- Hangul: 추소정
- RR: Chu Sojeong
- MR: Ch'u Sojŏng

Chu So-jung (Korean: 추소정; born November 6, 1995), known professionally as Exy (엑시), is a South Korean singer, songwriter, rapper and actress. She debuted as a member and leader of South Korean girl group WJSN formed under Starship and Yuehua in 2016.

== Early life ==
Exy was born on November 6, 1995, in Busan, South Korea. She attended Dongduk Women's University and graduated in August 2020 along with bandmate Soobin.

== Career ==
=== 2015–2016: Career beginnings ===
Exy participated in the reality survival rap program, Unpretty Rapstar 2 in 2015. Exy collaborated with Crucial Star on the single "쓸어버려", released on September 1, 2015. She then released her first solo single "Gettin' Em" on November 10, 2015. Exy was cast in the television series The Flatterer, playing as Saerim in the series.

Exy was revealed to be a member of WJSN and its "Sweet Unit" on December 24, 2015. WJSN debuted on February 25, 2016, with the release of their debut EP Would You Like?, including the lead singles "Mo Mo Mo" and "Catch Me".

On June 26, 2016, Exy participated in King of Masked Singer as a contestant. After being eliminated in the first round, she revealed that she originally trained as a vocalist. However, due to suffering from vocal nodules during her trainee period, she switched over to rap.

In August 2016, Exy, together with Seola, Soobin, Eunseo, Cheng Xiao, Yeoreum, and Dayoung teamed up with label mate Monsta X to form the unit "Y-Teen". Y-Teen was a project unit group that promoted as CF models for KT's phone fare service and would release EPs, music videos, and various entertainment content.

=== 2017–present: Solo activities ===
In April 2017, it was announced that Exy would be collaborating with rapper Euna Kim on the single "Love Therapy". The single was released on May 4, 2017, accompanied with a music video.

In February 2018, Exy made her songwriting debut with "겨울잠 (Thawing)", in the WJSN EP, Dream Your Dream. On March 25, 2018, She revealed her 2nd songwriting work during WJSN's 1st fanmeeting Uzzu Party, titled "2월의 봄 (You & I)". It was eventually included in the WJSN EP, WJ Please?. She was featured in Sobae's "Homegirl", released on March 27, 2018, and Choi Nakta's "Love Professor", released on December 23, 2018. In November 2019, Exy co-composed and co-wrote "Don't Touch", which was included in the WJSN EP, As You Wish.

On March 19, 2020, She participated in the OST for the drama Meow, the Secret Boy along with member Dayoung. In June 2020, Exy co-composed and co-wrote "불꽃놀이 (Tra-la)", which was included in the WJSN EP, Neverland.

In January 2021, She wrote lyrics for label mate Cravity's title track "My Turn" and "Bad Habits" from their 3rd EP, Season 3. Hideout: Be Our Voice. In mid-March 2021, Exy co-wrote the lyrics for The Boyz's "Prism" from their 1st Japanese studio album, Breaking Dawn. She was credited as 'XYZ(makeumine works)' on most platforms but 'Exy' on Melon. In late-March 2021, Exy co-composed and co-wrote "음 (Yalla)", which was included in the WJSN EP, Unnatural. On April 26, it was announced that Exy would be a member of WJSN's 2nd sub-unit WJSN The Black. The sub-unit debuted on May 12. Later in September 2021, Exy was confirmed to join the JTBC drama Idol: The Coup, which would air in the second half of 2021.

On August 1, 2022, it was confirmed that Exy would participate in the competition show The Second World.

== Discography ==
| Title | Year | Peak chart positions | Sales | Album |
| Title | Year | KOR | Sales | Album |
|---|---|---|---|---|
| "쓸어버려" (with Crucial Star) | 2015 | — | —N/a | Non-album single |
| "Gettin' Em" | 2015 | — | —N/a | Non-album single |
| "Love Therapy" (Sobae feat. Exy) | 2017 | — | —N/a | Non-album single |
| "Homegirl" (러브테라피) (with Euna Kim, feat. Zia) | 2018 | — | —N/a | Non-album single |
| "Love Professor" (러브테라피) (Nakta Choi feat. Exy) | 2018 | — | —N/a | Non-album single |
"—" denotes releases that did not chart or were not released in that region.

=== Soundtrack appearance ===
| Title | Year | Album | Ref. |
|---|---|---|---|
| "Oh My, Oh My" (with Dayoung) | 2020 | Meow, the Secret Boy OST Part 1 | |

=== Songwriting credits ===
All song credits are adapted from the Korea Music Copyright Association's database, unless otherwise noted.

| Title | Year | Album | Lyrics | Music and arrangement | Artist |
|---|---|---|---|---|---|
| "MoMoMo" (모모모) | 2016 | Would You Like? | ✓ | ✗ | WJSN |
| "MoMoMo" (Chinese Ver.) | 2016 | Would You Like? | ✓ | ✗ | WJSN |
| "Do Better" | 2016 | Non-album single | ✓ | ✗ | Y-teen |
| "Secret" (비밀이야) | 2016 | The Secret | ✓ | ✗ | WJSN |
| "Prince" (짠!) | 2016 | The Secret | ✓ | ✗ | WJSN |
| "I Wish" (너에게 닿기를) | 2017 | From. WJSN | ✓ | ✗ | WJSN |
| "Baby Come To Me" | 2017 | From. WJSN | ✓ | ✗ | WJSN |
| "Hug U" (이리와) | 2017 | From. WJSN | ✓ | ✗ | WJSN |
| "Love Therapy" (러브테라피) | 2017 | Non-album single | ✓ | ✗ | Exy, Euna Kim, Zia |
| "Miracle" (기적 같은 아이) | 2017 | Happy Moment | ✓ | ✗ | WJSN |
| "Babyface" | 2017 | Happy Moment | ✓ | ✗ | WJSN |
| "Plop Plop" (퐁당퐁당) | 2017 | Happy Moment | ✓ | ✗ | WJSN |
| "Follow Me" | 2017 | Happy Moment | ✓ | ✗ | WJSN |
| "B.B.B.Boo" | 2017 | Happy Moment | ✓ | ✗ | WJSN |
| "Geeminy" | 2017 | Happy Moment | ✓ | ✗ | WJSN |
| "Dreams Come True" (꿈꾸는 마음으로) | 2018 | Dream Your Dream | ✓ | ✗ | WJSN |
| "Love O'clock" (호두까기 인형) | 2018 | Dream Your Dream | ✓ | ✗ | WJSN |
| "Renaissance" (르네상스) | 2018 | Dream Your Dream | ✓ | ✗ | WJSN |
| "Starry Moment" (설레는 밤) | 2018 | Dream Your Dream | ✓ | ✗ | WJSN |
| "Thawing" (겨울잠) | 2018 | Dream Your Dream | ✓ | ✓ | WJSN |
| "Dreams Come True" (Chinese version) | 2018 | Dream Your Dream | ✓ | ✗ | WJSN |
| "Homegirl" | 2018 | Non-album single | ✓ | ✗ | Sobae (feat. Exy) |
| "Save Me, Save You" (부탁해) | 2018 | WJ Please? | ✓ | ✗ | WJSN |
| "You, You, You" (너, 너, 너) | 2018 | WJ Please? | ✓ | ✗ | WJSN |
| "I-Yah" (아이야) | 2018 | WJ Please? | ✓ | ✗ | WJSN |
| "Masquerade" (가면무도회) | 2018 | WJ Please? | ✓ | ✗ | WJSN |
| "Hurry Up" | 2018 | WJ Please? | ✓ | ✗ | WJSN |
| "You&I" (2월의 봄) | 2018 | WJ Please? | ✓ | ✓ | WJSN |
| "Love Professor" (연애박사) | 2018 | Non-album single | ✓ | ✗ | Nakta Choi, Exy |
| "La La Love" | 2019 | WJ Stay? | ✓ | ✗ | WJSN |
| "You Got" | 2019 | WJ Stay? | ✓ | ✗ | WJSN |
| "Star" (1억개의 볠) | 2019 | WJ Stay? | ✓ | ✗ | WJSN |
| "Memories" (그때 우리) | 2019 | WJ Stay? | ✓ | ✗ | WJSN |
| "Cantabile" (칸타빌레(노래하듯이)) | 2019 | WJ Stay? | ✓ | ✗ | WJSN |
| "12 O' Clock" | 2019 | WJ Stay? | ✓ | ✗ | WJSN |
| "Ujung" (우주정거장) | 2019 | WJ Stay? | ✓ | ✗ | WJSN |
| "Boogie Up" | 2019 | For the Summer | ✓ | ✗ | WJSN |
| "Oh My Summer" (눈부셔) | 2019 | For the Summer | ✓ | ✗ | WJSN |
| "Let's Dance" (우리끼리) | 2019 | For the Summer | ✓ | ✗ | WJSN |
| "Sugar Pop" | 2019 | For the Summer | ✓ | ✗ | WJSN |
| "As You Wish" (이루리) | 2019 | As You Wish | ✓ | ✗ | WJSN |
| "Luckitty-cat" (행운을 빌어) | 2019 | As You Wish | ✓ | ✗ | WJSN |
| "Lights Up" (야광별) | 2019 | As You Wish | ✓ | ✗ | WJSN |
| "WW" (우와) | 2019 | As You Wish | ✓ | ✗ | WJSN |
| "Badaboom" (바다봄) | 2019 | As You Wish | ✓ | ✗ | WJSN |
| "Full Moon" | 2019 | As You Wish | ✓ | ✗ | WJSN |
| "Don't Touch" | 2019 | As You Wish | ✓ | ✓ | WJSN |
| "Butterfly" | 2020 | Neverland | ✓ | ✗ | WJSN |
| "Hola" | 2020 | Neverland | ✓ | ✗ | WJSN |
| "Pantomime" | 2020 | Neverland | ✓ | ✗ | WJSN |
| "Where You Are" (바램) | 2020 | Neverland | ✓ | ✗ | WJSN |
| "Tra-la" (불꽃놀이) | 2020 | Neverland | ✓ | ✓ | WJSN |
| "Our Garden" (우리의 정원) | 2020 | Neverland | ✓ | ✗ | WJSN |
| "My Turn" | 2021 | Season 3. Hideout: Be Our Voice | ✓ | ✗ | Cravity |
| "Bad Habits" | 2021 | Season 3. Hideout: Be Our Voice | ✓ | ✗ | Cravity |
| "Unnatural" | 2021 | Unnatural | ✓ | ✗ | WJSN |
| "Super Moon" (원하는 모든 걸) | 2021 | Unnatural | ✓ | ✗ | WJSN |
| "New Me" | 2021 | Unnatural | ✓ | ✗ | WJSN |
| "Yalla" (음) | 2021 | Unnatural | ✓ | ✓ | WJSN |
| "Rewind" (잊지 마) | 2021 | Unnatural | ✓ | ✗ | WJSN |
| "Prism" | 2021 | Breaking Dawn | ✓ | ✗ | The Boyz |
| "Easy" | 2021 | My Attitude | ✓ | ✗ | WJSN The Black |
| "Kiss Your Lips" | 2021 | My Attitude | ✓ | ✗ | WJSN The Black |
| "Chandelier" | 2022 | Liberty: In Our Cosmos | ✓ | ✗ | Cravity |
| "The Light" (봄빛) | 2022 | The Light <Idol X Idol (music & lyrics> Single | ✗ | ✓ | Kei, Exy |
| "Navillera" (너그리고나) | 2022 | Queendom 2 Pt.2-1 Single | ✓ | ✗ | WJSN |
| "Aura" | 2022 | Queendom 2 Final | ✓ | ✓ | WJSN |
| "Last Sequence" | 2022 | Sequence | ✓ | ✗ | WJSN |
| "Done" | 2022 | Sequence | ✓ | ✓ | WJSN |
| "Dream Trip" | 2023 | Rose Blossom | ✓ | ✓ | H1-Key |
| "A to Z" | 2023 | Master: Piece | ✓ | ✗ | Cravity |
| "Lips" | 2023 | I've Ive | ✓ | ✗ | Ive |
| "Seasons" | 2023 | Narcissus | ✓ | ✗ | Dawn (feat. Gemini) |
| "Lullaby" | 2023 | Narcissus | ✓ | ✗ | Dawn (feat. Gemini) |
| "Heya" (헤야) | 2024 | Ive Switch | ✓ | ✗ | Ive |
| "Slippery" | 2024 | We Are Gravity | ✓ | ✗ | I:MOND |
| "All I Need" (feat. Eric from The Boyz) | 2024 | Blessed | ✓ | ✗ | Ha Sungwoon |
| "Pimple" | 2024 | I'll Like You | ✓ | ✗ | Illit |
| "You Wanna Cry" | 2025 | Ive Empathy | ✓ | ✗ | Ive |
| "Switch Off" | 2025 | Interview X | ✓ | ✗ | Xiumin |
| "Reserved" | 2025 | Xpert | ✓ | ✗ | Double 0ne |
| "Body" | 2025 | Gonna Love Me, Right? | ✓ | ✗ | Dayoung |
| "Heaven Smiles" | 2025 | Non-album single | ✓ | ✗ | Idid |
| "Not Me" | 2025 | Not Cute Anymore | ✓ | ✗ | Illit |
| "Oops, My Bad" | 2025 | Operation: True Love OST | ✓ | ✗ | Fifty Fifty |
| "Pung!" | 2026 | Girl Meets Boy | ✓ | ✗ | Madein |
| "Pung!" (Acapella) | 2026 | Girl Meets Boy | ✓ | ✗ | Madein |
| "Bang Bang" | 2026 | Revive+ | ✓ | ✗ | Ive |
| "Bloom Hour" | 2026 | Bloom Hour | ✓ | ✓ | WJSN |
| "Mirror" | 2026 | Bloom Hour | ✓ | ✓ | WJSN |
| "Ice Cream" | 2026 | Ice Cream | ✓ | ✗ | Yuna |
| "Hungry (Side A)" | 2026 | Our Birthday | ✓ | ✗ | Ourbirthday |

== Filmography ==
=== Film ===
| Year | Title | Role | Notes | Ref. |
|---|---|---|---|---|
| 2022 | Urban Myths | woman | Netflix film | |
| 2026 | Eighteen Youth | Kyung-hee | | |
| 2026 | The Haunted House | Se-jeong | | |
| TBA | Akgu: The Secret of the Moon Shadow | Ja-kyeong | | |

=== Television series ===
| Year | Title | Role | Notes | Ref. |
|---|---|---|---|---|
| 2021 | Idol: The Coup | El | | |
| 2024 | Marry You | Cha Min-ji | Cameo | |
| 2025 | The Divorce Insurance | Jo Ah-young | | |

=== Web series ===
| Year | Title | Role | Ref. |
|---|---|---|---|
| 2015 | The Flatterer | Saerim | |
| 2025 | Heo's Diner | Bong Eun-sil | |

=== Television shows ===
| Year | Title | Role | Ref. |
|---|---|---|---|
| 2015 | Unpretty Rapstar 2 | Contestant | |
| 2016 | King of Mask Singer | Contestant | |
| 2018 | I Have Something to Say Today | Cast member | |
| 2020 | King of Mask Singer | Contestant | |
| 2022 | The Second World | Contestant | |
| 2022–2023 | Cabin Crew | New employee | |

=== Web shows ===
| Year | Title | Role | Ref. |
|---|---|---|---|
| 2022 | Idol Lyricist Idol | with Kei | |

=== Radio shows ===
| Year | Title | Role | Notes | Ref. |
|---|---|---|---|---|
| 2022 | Turn Up the Volume | Special DJ | August 15 | |
