= The Second World (TV series) =

South Korean television program

- Promotional poster
- Hangul: 두 번째 세계
- RR: Du beonjjae segye
- MR: Tu pŏntchae segye
- Genre: Reality competition Music
- Presented by: Paul Kim
- Starring: Yubin; Jimin; Moonbyul; Mimi; Exy; JooE; Moon Sua; Kim Seon-you
- Judges: See below
- Country of origin: South Korea
- Original language: Korean
- No. of seasons: 1
- No. of episodes: 10

Production
- Executive producer: Kim Hyung-joong
- Producers: You Hee-kyung; Kim Heon-ju; Choi Ji-eun; Cho Hwa-seon; Woo Chan-young; Yoo Kyung-ok; Ahn Joon; Kim Min-ji; Hong Yu-ri; Jang Ji-woong; Kim Dae-hyeok; Lee Kwan; Kwon Oh-kyung; Jeon Ye-ji; Im Jin-hee
- Production location: South Korea
- Production company: JTBC

Original release
- Network: JTBC2
- Release: August 30 – November 8, 2022

Second World (Korean: 두 번째 세계) is a South Korean reality competition program created by JTBC. It premiered on JTBC on August 30, 2022, and aired for four months over a total of 10 episodes. The premise of the show involves eight female K-pop rappers competing against each other to showcase their vocal abilities. The winner was Moonbyul, with Exy finishing as runner-up.

== Concept and format ==
Second World was a singing competition featuring head-to-head battles, unit performances, original re-arrangements of well-known songs and collaborations with various producers.

The show's concept revolved around the aim of showcasing the vocal abilities of rappers in K-pop groups, who are often misconceived as not being strong singers. Furthermore, the show allowed them to showcase their diverse musicality which may not have often been possible when limited to their role as rappers in their respective groups.

The results hinged on judges' voting and audience participation, including global voting at the end of each episode. The finale was broadcast live on November 8, 2022 and Moonbyul was crowned the official winner through live voting.

== Judges ==
The judges, named "Voice Readers" in the show:

- Kim Bum-soo
- Jungyup
- Jung Eun-ji
- Seo Eun-kwang
- Kim Min-seok

== Contestants ==
Artist	Debut Group	Card Name
Yubin	Wonder Girls	Judgment
Jimin	AOA	The Hermit → Wheel of Fortune
Moonbyul	Mamamoo	The Emperor
Mimi	Oh My Girl	Strength
Exy	WJSN	The Devil
JooE	Momoland	The Sun
Moon Sua	Billlie	The Magician
Kim Seon-you	CLASS:y	The Star

== Performances ==
=== Prequel - The Moment of Work (Episode 1) ===
Order	Contestant	Song title	Video
1	Moon Sua	"The Magician"	
2	Yubin	"The Second World"	
3	JooE	"Decaffeine"	
4	Mimi	"Sunset"	
5	Kim Seon-you	"Fifteen"	
6	Moonbyul	"On My Way"	
7	Jimin	"VVWD"	
8	Exy	"Diamonds"	—N/a

=== Round 1 - Title Match (Episode 2-3) ===
For each round, the maximum score is 1,000 points. Scoring from the 5 Voice Readers (judges) would contribute to 70% of the score, while online preliminary voting from the Global Hearers (audience) would contribute to 30% of the score. Each vote from a Voice Reader is equivalent to 100 points while winning the one-on-one match will grant the contestant an addition of 200 points, having 700 points the maximum score from Voice Readers. Global Hearer scores are based on a maximum of 300 points, wherein the contestant with the highest number of preliminary votes receiving 300 points, and the scores of the rest of contestants shall be based in proportion with the highest votes.

Winner

Round	Contestant	Song title	Original performer	Votes
1	Mimi	"Up in the Sky" (하늘 위로)	Lexy	4
1	Exy	"Depressed Letter" (우울한 편지)	Yoo Jae-ha	1
2	Yubin	"Invitation" (초대)	Uhm Jung-hwa	2
2	Jimin	"Magic Carpet Ride" (매직 카펫 라이드)	Jaurim	3
3	Moon Sua	"The Truth Untold" (전하지 못한 진심)	BTS	2
3	Kim Seon-you	"Winter Flower" (雪中梅)	Younha, RM	3
4	Moonbyul	"Congratulations"	Day6	5
4	JooE	"Domino"	Jessie J	0

Rank	Contestant	Points			Total Points
Rank	Contestant	Voice Reader	1 vs 1 Battle	Global Hearer	Total Points
1st	Moonbyul	500	200	300	1,000
2nd	Mimi	400	200	97	697
3rd	Kim Seon-you	300	200	92	592
4th	Jimin	300	200	58	558
5th	Exy	100	0	229	329
6th	Yubin	200	0	112	312
7th	Moon Sua	200	0	88	288
8th	JooE	0	0	59	59

=== Round 2 - Unit Match (Episode 4) ===
Winner

Round	Contestant	Song title	Original performer	Votes
1	Meow (Mimi & Kim Seon-you)	"Savior" (구원자)	Lee Hi	0
1	SQS (Moonbyul & Exy)	"Energetic" (에너제틱)	Wanna One	5
2	Who X (JooE & Moon Sua)	"What Type of X" (어떤 X)	Jessi	5
2	27 (Yubin & Jimin)	"Very Good"	Block B	0

Rank	Contestant	Points			Total Points
Rank	Contestant	Voice Reader	1 vs 1 Battle	Global Hearer	Total Points
1st	SQS (Moonbyul & Exy)	500	200	300	1,000
2nd	Who X (JooE & Moon Sua)	500	200	116	816
3rd	Meow (Mimi & Kim Seon-you)	0	0	151	151
4th	27 (Yubin & Jimin)	0	0	120	120

Rounds 1-2: Cumulative Scores & Ranking
Rank	Contestant	Points		
Rank	Contestant	Round 1	Round 2	Total Points
1st	Moonbyul	1,000	1,000	2,000
2nd	Exy	329	1,000	1,329
3rd	Moon Sua	288	816	1,104
4th	JooE	59	816	875
5th	Mimi	697	151	848
6th	Kim Seon-you	592	151	743
7th	Jimin	558	120	678
8th	Yubin	312	120	432

=== Round 3 - Producer Match (Episode 5-7) ===
Winner

Round	Song title (Producer)	Contestant	Arrangement	Votes
1	"XTRAORDINARY" (Devine Channel)	Jimin	Dawn	3
1	"XTRAORDINARY" (Devine Channel)	JooE	Night	2
2	"Burinake" (부리나케) (Baekho, BuildingOwner)	Exy	Latin	1
2	"Burinake" (부리나케) (Baekho, BuildingOwner)	Kim Seon-you	Newtro	4
3	"Rain" (비가 오면 생각이 나) (Rocoberry)	Moon Sua	Jazz Sound	3
3	"Rain" (비가 오면 생각이 나) (Rocoberry)	Mimi	Hip Hop Sound	2
4	"I'll Throw It" (버릴걸) (Park Myung-soo, Yoo Jae-hwan)	Moonbyul	Disco	0
4	"I'll Throw It" (버릴걸) (Park Myung-soo, Yoo Jae-hwan)	Yubin	Retro City Pop	5

Rank	Contestant	Points			Total Points
Rank	Contestant	Voice Reader	1 vs 1 Battle	Global Hearer	Total Points
1st	Yubin	500	200	83	783
2nd	Kim Seon-you	400	200	76	676
3rd	Moon Sua	300	200	88	588
4th	Jimin	300	200	66	566
5th	Exy	100	0	221	321
6th	Moonbyul	0	0	300	300
7th	Mimi	200	0	91	291
8th	JooE	200	0	76	276

Rounds 1-3: Cumulative Scores & Ranking
Rank	Contestant	Points			
Rank	Contestant	Round 1	Round 2	Round 3	Total Points
1st	Moonbyul	1,000	1,000	300	2,300
2nd	Moon Sua	288	816	588	1,692
3rd	Exy	329	1,000	321	1,650
4th	Kim Seon-you	592	151	676	1,419
5th	Jimin	558	120	566	1,244
6th	Yubin	312	120	783	1,215
7th	JooE	59	816	276	1,151
8th	Mimi	697	151	291	1,139

=== Round 4 - Death Match (Episode 7-9) ===
Winner

Round	Contestant	Song title	Original performer	Votes
1	Exy	"Wave" (feat. Jeong Se-woon)	―	2
1	JooE	"Our Dream" (우리의 꿈)	Koyote	3
2	Kim Seon-you	"Dramarama"	Monsta X	0
2	Mimi	"pporappippam" (보라빛 밤)	Sunmi	5
3	Moon Sua	"Night Dream" (야몽음인 (夜夢陰人))	Lee Bada	5
3	Yubin	"Scattered Days" (흩어진 나날들)	Kang Susie	0
4	Moonbyul	"Refuge" (기댈곳)	Psy	5
4	Jimin	"U-Go-Girl"	Lee Hyori	0

Rank	Contestant	Points			Total Points
Rank	Contestant	Voice Reader	1 vs 1 Battle	Global Hearer	Total Points
1st	Moonbyul	500	200	300	1000
2nd	Mimi	500	200	94	794
3rd	Moon Sua	500	200	73	773
4th	JooE	300	200	71	571
5th	Exy	200	0	213	413
6th	Yubin	0	0	155	155
7th	Kim Seon-you	0	0	66	66
8th	Jimin	0	0	65	65

=== Preliminary Results ===
==== Points Summary (Rounds 1-4) ====
Eliminated

Rank	Contestant	Points				Total Points
Rank	Contestant	Round 1	Round 2	Round 3	Round 4	Total Points
1st	Moonbyul	1,000	1,000	300	1000	3,300
2nd	Moon Sua	288	816	588	773	2,465
3rd	Exy	329	1,000	321	413	2,063
4th	Mimi	697	151	291	794	1,933
5th	JooE	59	816	276	571	1,722
6th	Kim Seon-you	592	151	676	66	1,485
7th	Yubin	312	120	783	155	1,370
8th	Jimin	558	120	566	65	1,309

=== Final Round (Episode 10) ===
In the final round, all points from the four preliminary rounds shall not be counted and will be based solely on the votes for the final songs and stages. The total score would be 10,000 points, where 40% would be based from global preliminary voting and 60% would be based from live voting via text. For the preliminary votes, two out of the five contestants must be voted. For the live text voting, either the number order or the Hangul name of the artist must be submitted to count as a vote, and voting for multiple artists are allowed. However, voting on the same artist multiple times is prohibited. Points conversion will be based on ratio method from the number of votes, rounding the scores to the nearest whole number, with the total scores of all contestants would be 4,000 and 6,000 on the Global Vote Score and Real-Time Vote Score, respectively.

Order	Contestant	Song title
1	Mimi	"The Original"
2	Exy	"Birthday Party"
3	Moon Sua	"The Magic!an" (feat. Sheon and Siyoon of Billlie)
4	JooE	"Now"
5	Moonbyul	"Comma" (쉼(,))

Rank	Contestant	No. of Votes		Points		Total Score (10,000)
Rank	Contestant	Global Votes	Live Votes	Global Vote Score (4,000)	Real-Time Vote Score (6,000)	Total Score (10,000)
1st	Moonbyul	36,797	6,272	1,542	2,615	4,157
2nd	Exy	13,447	4,134	564	1,723	2,287
3rd	Mimi	13,659	2,659	573	1,109	1,682
4th	JooE	20,594	325	863	135	998
5th	Moon Sua	10,927	1,002	458	418	876

== Final ranking ==
Rank	Artist	Debut Group	Card Name
1	Moonbyul	Mamamoo	The Emperor
2	Exy	WJSN	The Devil
3	Mimi	Oh My Girl	Strength
4	JooE	Momoland	The Sun
5	Moon Sua	Billlie	The Magician
6	Kim Seon-you	CLASS:y	The Star
7	Yubin	Wonder Girls	Judgment
8	Jimin	AOA	The Hermit → Wheel of Fortune

== Discography ==
=== The Second World Episode 2 ===
Released on September 7, 2022
No.	Title	Lyrics	Music	Artist	Length
1.	"Depressed Letter" (우울한 편지)	Yoo Jae-ha	Yoo Jae-ha, Makecake36	Exy	3:43
2.	"Invitation" (초대)	J.Y. Park	J.Y. Park, DINT, T-lack (HIGHBRID)	Yubin	3:25

=== The Second World Episode 3 ===
Released on September 14, 2022
No.	Title	Lyrics	Music	Artist	Length
1.	"WINTER FLOWER" (雪中梅)	Younha, EDEN, RM	LEEZ, Ollounder, EDEN, Kwon Tae-eun	Kim Seon-you	4:07
2.	"Congratulations"	Day6	Hong Ji-sang, Lee Woo-min (collapsedone), Day6, Cocodooboopapa (RBW)	Moonbyul	4:41

=== The Second World Episode 4 ===
Released on September 21, 2022
No.	Title	Lyrics	Music	Artist	Length
1.	"Saviour" (구원자)	B.I	B.I; Stally; Basecamp; DJ Kaesama; Kim Dong-min	Meow (Mimi & Kim Seon-you)	3:30
2.	"Energetic" (에너제틱)	Hui; Wooseok	Flow Blow; Hui; Cocodooboopapa (RBW)	SQS (Moonbyul & Exy)	4:09
3.	"Domino"	Henry Walter; Jessica Cornish; Lukasz Gottwald; Claude Kelly; Max Martin	Henry Walter; Jessica Cornish; Lukasz Gottwald; Claude Kelly; Max Martin; Kwon Tae-eun	JooE	4:23

=== The Second World Episode 5 ===
Released on October 5, 2022
No.	Title	Lyrics	Music	Artist	Length
1.	"XTRAORDINARY (Dawn ver.)"	Devine Channel	Devine Channel; Park Kyoung-young	Shin Jimin	2:30
2.	"XTRAORDINARY (Night ver.)"	Devine Channel	Devine Channel; Park Kyoung-young	JooE	2:43
3.	"Burinake (LATIN ver.)" (부리나케)	Baekho; BuildingOwner; Elum; Exy	Baekho; BuildingOwner; Elum; Hey Farmer; Ohway!; SUMMER CAKE	Exy	3:21
4.	"What Type of X"	PSY; Jessi; JAE RO; KOALA	PSY; Jessi; Yoo Gun-hyung; CuzD; JohnJohn; JAE RO; DONNA; SPACE ONE; Im Sang-mook (Crash); Kim So-han (Diablo); Jung Yong-wook(Crash)	Who X (JooE & Moon Sua)	3:42
5.	"Very Good"	Zico	Zico; Poptime; DINT; T-lack (HIGHBRID)	Twenty-Seven (Yubin & Shin Jimin)	3:42

=== The Second World Episode 6 ===
Released on October 12, 2022
No.	Title	Lyrics	Music	Artist	Length
1.	"Burinake (NEWTRO ver.)" (부리나케)	Baekho; BuildingOwner; Elum	Baekho; BuildingOwner; Elum; Hey Farmer	Kim Seon-you	3:21
2.	"Rain" (비가 오면 생각이 나)	Rocco; Berry	Rocco; Berry; Joseph K	Moon Sua	3:37
3.	"Rain" (비가 오면 생각이 나)	Rocco; Berry; Mimi	Rocco; Berry; Lee Yujin	Mimi	3:11
4.	"I'll Throw It Away (ver. DISCO)" (버릴걸)	Park Myung-soo; Yoo Jae-hwan	Jung In-kyung; Park Myung-soo; Yoo Jae-hwan; Lee Hoo-sang (RBW)	Moonbyul	3:21

=== The Second World Episode 7 ===
Released on October 19, 2022
No.	Title	Lyrics	Music	Artist	Length
1.	"I'll Throw It Away (ver. Retro City pop)" (버릴걸)	Park Myung-soo; Yoo Jae-hwan; Yubin	Jung In-kyung; Park Myung-soo; Yoo Jae-hwan; DINT; T-lack (HIGHBRID); Add Blessed	Yubin	3:01
2.	"Wave (feat. Jeong Sewoon)"	Exy	MAKECAKE36; Exy; Jeong Sewoon	Exy, Jeong Sewoon	2:59
3.	"Our Dream" (우리의 꿈)	Lee Won-hee	Park Yo-han; Kwon Tae-eun	JooE	3:56

=== The Second World Episode 8 ===
Released on October 26, 2022
No.	Title	Lyrics	Music	Artist	Length
1.	"pporappippam" (보라빛 밤)	Sunmi	Sunmi; FRANTS; DJ Kaesama; INDY	Mimi	3:14
2.	"Night Dream" (야몽음인)	Lee Ba-da	Lee Ba-da; Klozer; Ecobridge; arcon; Mosin	Moon Sua	4:01
3.	"Scattered Days" (흩어진 나날들)	Kang Susie	Yoon Sang; Seo Jung-jin; Kim Doo-hyun	Yubin	3:57

=== The Second World FINAL ===
Released on November 9, 2022
No.	Title	Lyrics	Music	Artist	Length
1.	"The Original"	Cho Yoon-kyung; Mimi	Jenson Vaughn; Justin Gray	Mimi	2:49
2.	"Birthday Party"	Exy	Ryan S. Jhun; Harlœ; Ally Ahern; Jason Burve; William Zaire Simmons; Trevor David Brown; "Downtown" Trevor Brown; Zaire Koalo for the Orphanage	Exy	2:44
3.	"The Magic!an (feat. Sheon, Siyoon of Billlie)"	Le'mon; Moon Sua	SOFTSERVEBOY (153/Joombas); Julia Ross; Candace Sosa; WD; SQVARE	Moon Sua, Sheon, Siyoon	3:39
4.	"Now"	Yummu tone; Mospick; Yummy tone	Yummu tone; Mospick; Yummy tone	JooE	3:51
5.	"Comma" (쉼(,))	Lee Sang-ho (RBW); Seo Yong-bae (RBW); Lee Hoo-sang (RBW); Cocodooboopapa (RBW)	Lee Sang-ho (RBW); Seo Yong-bae (RBW); Lee Hoo-sang (RBW); Cocodooboopapa (RBW)	Moonbyul	3:12
6.	"U-Go-Girl"	E-Tribe	E-Tribe; 623	Shin Jimin	2:24
7.	"Dramarama"	Seo Ji-eun; Seo Jung-ah; Jooheon; I.M	Andreas Oberg, Drew Ryan Scott; Kwon Tae-eun	Kim Seon-you	4:05

== Ratings ==
Average TV viewership ratings (nationwide)
Ep.	Original broadcast date	Average audience share (Nielsen Korea)
1	August 30, 2022	0.752% (35th)
2	September 6, 2022	0.683 (36th)
3	September 13, 2022	0.618 (43rd)
4	September 20, 2022	0.471 (49th)
5	October 4, 2022	0.646 (37th)
6	October 11, 2022	0.681 (35th)
7	October 18, 2022	0.474 (45th)
8	October 25, 2022	0.443 (48th)
9	November 6, 2022	0.489 (47th)
10	November 8, 2022	0.309 (51st)
Average		
The blue numbers represent the lowest ratings and the red numbers represent the highest ratings.; This show airs on a cable networks (paid television) which normally has a relatively smaller audience compared to shows broadcast (free-to-air) on public networks as KBS, SBS, MBC or EBS.
