= Dawon (singer) =

South Korea singer (born 1997)

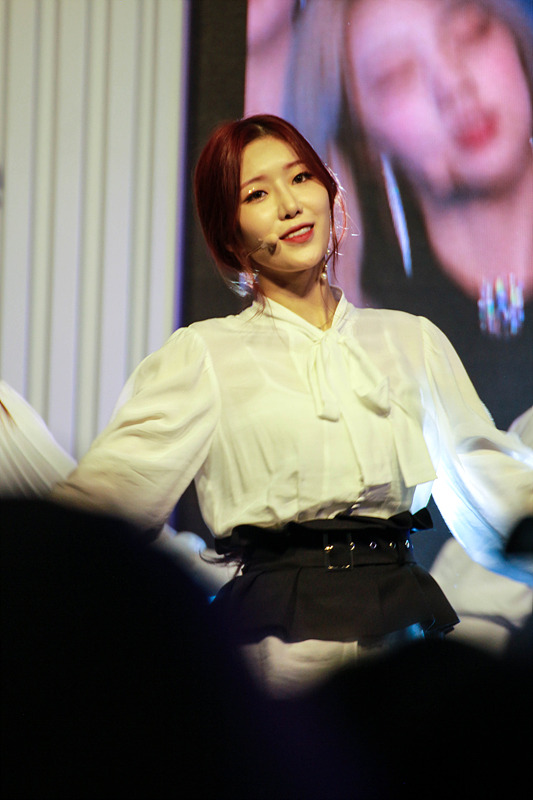
- Dawon in 2018
- Born: May 27, 1997 (age 29); Seoul, South Korea
- Education: Chungdam High School
- Occupations: Singer; actress
- Musical career
- Genre: K-pop
- Instrument: Vocals
- Years active: 2016–present
- Labels: Starship; Yuehua
- Member of: WJSN
- Formerly of: Starship Planet

Korean name
- Hangul: 남다원
- Hanja: 南多願
- RR: Nam Dawon
- MR: Nam Tawŏn

Nam Da-won (Korean: 남다원; born May 27, 1997), known mononymously as Dawon, is a South Korean singer and actress. She is a member of the South Korean girl group WJSN.

== Early life ==
Dawon was born on May 27, 1997. She graduated from Chungdam High School.

== Career ==
=== Pre-debut ===
Dawon appeared on the second season of the South Korean reality television competition show K-pop Star 2, which aired in 2012. She joined Starship Entertainment as a trainee sometime afterwards.

=== 2016–present: Debut with WJSN and solo activities ===
On February 25, 2016, Nam made her debut as a member of South Korean–Chinese girl group WJSN with debut EP Would You Like?.

On July 14, 2016, Nam released single "Shalala Romance" for the soundtrack of the television series Lucky Romance. Later in 2016, Dawon appeared as a contestant on the singing competition show Girl Spirit, which aired on JTBC from July 19 to September 27. On November 8, 2016, Dawon and her labelmate Junggigo, released the single "I Will Love You Piece By Piece" for the soundtrack of the television series Sweet Stranger and Me. On December 17, 2016, Dawon and fellow WJSN member Yeonjung released a Korean recording of "Fire & Ice", a song from the soundtrack of the Russian children's film The Snow Queen 3: Fire and Ice. On November 5, 2017, "Go Ready Go", was released as part of the soundtrack for the television series Revolutionary Love.

In 2020, Dawon made her acting debut in the musical film K-School. The release of the film was originally scheduled for December 2020, but currently there is no confirmation as to when the release will be rescheduled due to controversy involving a cast member. The film was released on February 21, 2024.

Dawon along with Yeonjung participated in Immortal Songs: Singing the Legend. They performed with Xitsuh and Koo Jun-yup and eventually became the final winner. On August 10, Dawon and Yeonjung released a cover song of Taeyeon's "Starlight" for NORAE-ing LIVE of Time. The pair went on to make an appearance on Jo Se-ho's Jo Se-ho's Wine Bar.

On March 3, 2023, Dawon left Starship Entertainment after her contract ended, however it was stated that she would not be leaving the group. For WJSN's 10th anniversary, she covered "A Thousand Years" by Christina Perri on Instagram Live.

== Personal life ==
On February 22, 2022, Dawon's agency confirmed that she will temporarily suspend activities due to anxiety. The plan is to focus on her treatment.

== Discography ==
=== As lead artist ===
List of singles, showing year released, selected chart positions, sales, and name of the album
Title	Year	Peak chart position	Sales	Album
Title	Year	KOR	Sales	Album
"Stronger" (with Yeonjung) (Note: Song was released under WJSN, but is a solo track by Dawon and Yeonjung.)	2022	— (Note: "Stronger" did not enter the Circle Digital chart top 200, but appeared at number 93 on the component Download chart.)	—N/a	Sequence
"—" denotes releases that did not chart or were not released in that region.

=== Soundtrack appearances ===
List of singles, showing year released, selected chart positions, and name of the album
Title	Year	Peak chart position	Album
Title	Year	KOR Gaon	Album
"Shalala Romance" (샤랄라 로맨스)	2016	—	Lucky Romance OST Part 4
"I Will Love You Piece By Piece" (소소하게 조금씩) (with Junggigo)	2016	—	Sweet Stranger and Me OST Part 4
"Fire & Ice" (with Yeonjung)	2016	—	The Snow Queen 3: Fire and Ice OST
"Go Ready Go"	2017	—	Revolutionary Love OST Part 3
"—" denotes releases that did not chart or were not released in that region.

=== Composition credits ===
All song credits are adapted from the Korea Music Copyright Association's database unless stated otherwise.

List of songs, showing year released, artist name, and name of the album
Title	Year	Artist	Album	Lyricist	Composer
"Ujung" (우주정거장)	2019	WJSN	WJ Stay?	Yes	Yes
"Full Moon"	2019	WJSN	As You Wish	No	Yes
"Stronger" (with Yeonjung)	2022	WJSN	Sequence	No	Yes

== Filmography ==
=== Film ===
Year	Title		Role	Ref.
Year	English	Korean	Role	Ref.
2024	K-School	K스쿨	Soo-ah	

=== Television shows ===
Year	Title		Role	Notes	Ref.
Year	English	Korean	Role	Notes	Ref.
2012	K-pop Star 2	K팝스타 2	Contestant	Pre-debut appearance	
2016	Girl Spirit	걸스피릿	Contestant		
