= Heya (Ive song) =

Single by Ive

from the EP Ive Switch
- Language: Korean; English
- Released: April 29, 2024
- Studio: Ingrid Studio
- Genre: Hip-hop
- Length: 3:10
- Label: Starship; Kakao; Columbia
- Composers: Ryan S. Jhun; Dem Jointz; Ido Nadjar; Kloe Latimer; Jack Brady; Jordan Roman
- Lyricists: Lee Seu-ran; Exy; Sohlhee

Ive singles chronology
"All Night" (2024)	"Heya" (2024)	"Accendio" (2024)

Music video
- "Heya" on YouTube

"Heya" (Korean: 해야; RR: Haeya; lit. '"Sun!"') is a song recorded by South Korean girl group Ive for their second Korean-language extended play Ive Switch. It was released as the EP's lead single on April 29, 2024, by Starship Entertainment.

== Background and release ==
On April 3, 2024, Starship Entertainment announced that Ive would be releasing their second extended play, Ive Switch, on April 29. On April 20, the track listing was released with "Heya" and "Accendio" announced as the lead singles. A day later, a motion teaser video was released, followed by the music video teaser on April 24. On April 28, the highlight medley teaser video was released. The song was released alongside its music video and the extended play on April 29.

== Composition ==
"Heya" was written by Lee Seu-ran, Exy, and Sohlhee, composed and arranged by Ryan S. Jhun, Dem Jointz, Jack Brady and Jordan Roman of The Wavys, and Ido Nadjar, with Kloe Latimer participating in the composition. Described as a hip hop song with lyrics about "folk tale", "Heya" was composed in the key of F minor, with a tempo of 92 beats per minute.

== Commercial performance ==
"Heya" debuted at number eight on South Korea's Circle Digital Chart in the chart issue dated April 28 – May 5, 2024. The song then ascended to number two in the chart issue dated May 12–18, 2024. On the Billboard South Korea Songs, the song debuted at number 11 in the chart issue dated May 11, 2024, ascending to number two in the following week. In Japan, "Heya" debuted at number 32 on the Billboard Japan Hot 100 in the chart issue dated May 8, 2024. On the Oricon Combined Singles, the song debuted at number 13 in the chart issue dated May 13, 2024.

In Singapore, "Heya" debuted at number 22 on the RIAS Top Streaming Chart in the chart issue dated May 3–9, 2024. The song also debuted at number 17 on the RIAS Top Regional Chart in the chart issue dated April 26 – May 2, 2024, ascending to number eight in the following week. In Malaysia, the song debuted at number 14 on the RIM Top 20 Most Streamed International in the chart issue dated May 3–9, 2024. The song also debuted at number 21 on the Billboard Malaysia Songs in the chart issue dated May 18, 2024. In Taiwan, the song debuted at number eight on the Billboard Taiwan Songs in the chart issue dated May 11, 2024, ascending to number four in the following week. In Hong Kong, the song debuted at number 13 on the Billboard Hong Kong Songs in the chart issue dated May 18, 2024. In New Zealand, the song debuted at number 30 on the RMNZ Hot Singles on the chart dated May 6, 2024. Globally, the song peaked at number 56 on the Billboard Global 200 in the chart issue dated May 18, 2024.

== Promotion ==
Following the release of Ive Switch, on April 29, 2024, Ive held a live event on YouTube aimed at introducing the extended play and its tracks, including "Heya", and connecting with their fanbase. They subsequently performed on three music programs in the first week of promotion: KBS's Music Bank on May 3, MBC's Show! Music Core on May 4, and SBS's Inkigayo on May 5. In the second week of promotion, they performed on three music programs: Music Bank on May 10, Show! Music Core on May 11, and Inkigayo on May 12. On the third and final week of promotion, they performed on four music programs: Mnet's M Countdown on May 16, Music Bank on May 17, Show! Music Core on May 18, and Inkigayo on May 19.

== Credits and personnel ==
Credits adapted from liner notes of Ive Switch.

Studio

- Ingrid Studio – recording, digital editing
- Alawn Music Studios – mixing
- 821 Sound Mastering – mastering

Personnel

- Ive – vocals
- Perrie – background vocals, vocal directing
- Lee Seu-ran – lyrics
- Exy – lyrics
- Sohlhee – lyrics
- Ryan S. Jhun – composition, arrangement
- Dem Jointz – composition, arrangement
- Ido Nadjar – composition, arrangement
- Kloe Latimer – composition
- Jack Brady – composition
- Jordan Roman – composition
- The Wavys – arrangement
- Yang Young-eun – recording, digital editing
- Alawn – mixing
- Kwon Nam-woo – mastering
- Yoo Eun-jin – mastering (assistant)

== Charts ==
=== Weekly charts ===
Weekly chart performance for "Heya"
Chart (2024)	Peak position
Global 200 (Billboard)	56
Hong Kong (Billboard)	13
Japan (Japan Hot 100)	32
Japan Combined Singles (Oricon)	33
Malaysia (Billboard)	21
Malaysia International (RIM)	14
New Zealand Hot Singles (RMNZ)	30
Singapore (RIAS)	22
South Korea (Circle)	2
Taiwan (Billboard)	4

=== Monthly charts ===
Monthly chart performance for "Heya"
Chart (2024)	Position
South Korea (Circle)	3

=== Year-end charts ===
Year-end chart performance for "Heya"
Chart	Year	Position
South Korea (Circle)	2024	24
South Korea (Circle)	2025	100

== Release history ==
Release history for "Heya"
Region	Date	Format	Label
Various	April 29, 2024	Digital download; streaming	Starship; Kakao; Columbia
