= Chungdam High School =

Location
- 66 Sinbanpo-ro 23-gil Seocho-gu, Seoul; South Korea; 37.51108°N 127.00503°E

Information
- Type: Public School
- Established: 1990
- School district: Seoul Metropolitan Office of Education
- Principal: Lee Hyun-sook
- Faculty: 80
- Enrollment: 603

Chungdam High School (Korean: 청담고등학교) is a public high school located in Jamwon-dong, Seocho District, Seoul, South Korea. It was opened in 1990.

== Notable alumni ==
- Ahn Hyo-seop (actor)
- Bang Chan of Stray Kids
- Choi Hyunsuk of TREASURE
- Choi Sooyoung of Girls' Generation
- Jennie Kim of Blackpink
- Jung Sungchan of RIIZE
- Kai (Kim Jongin) of EXO
- Kang Young-hyun of DAY6
- Kim Geonwoo of ALPHA DRIVE ONE
- Kim Seungmin of Stray Kids
- Kim Taeyeon of Girls' Generation
- Kim Woojin (soloist)
- Lee Daehwi of AB6IX
- Lee Sunmi (soloist)
- Lee Taemin of SHINee
- Liz of IVE
- Nam Dawon of WJSN
- Park Jihyo of TWICE
- Peniel Shin of BtoB
- Son Naeun of Apink
- Taesan (Han Dongmin) of BOYNEXTDOOR
