= Dream Your Dream =

- Digital and αγυρτης version cover

EP by WJSN
- Released: February 27, 2018
- Recorded: December 2017 – January 2018
- Venues: Seoul, South Korea
- Studio: Starship Studios
- Length: 21:12
- Labels: Starship; LOEN

WJSN chronology
Happy Moment (2017)	Dream Your Dream (2018)	WJ Please? (2018)

Singles from Dream Your Dream
- 1. "Dreams Come True" Released: February 27, 2018

Dream Your Dream is the fourth extended play by South Korean-Chinese girl group WJSN. It was released on February 27, 2018, by Starship Entertainment, and distributed by LOEN Entertainment. It contains a total of six songs, including a Korean and a Chinese version of the lead single "Dreams Come True".

== Background and release ==
On January 21, 2018 Starship Entertainment revealed that WJSN would return on February 27. With a comeback schedule being released on February 4 through the group's official Twitter and Instagram accounts, it revealed that WJSN would be releasing their fourth extended play titled Dream Your Dream. Starship Entertainment released teasers of each unit from February 5 to February 7, along with a full group teaser being released two days later. WJSN released another group teaser on February 13. The release of album's tracklist on February 21 revealed the name of the lead single, "Dreams Come True", composed by Full8loom. The teaser of the music video for "Dreams Come True" was released on February 23.

WJSN held their comeback showcase at Yes 24 Live Hall on February 27, the same day as the album's release, where they performed the lead single "Dreams Come True" for the first time. It was broadcast live through Naver app V-Live.

== Track listing ==
No.	Title	Lyrics	Music	Arrangement	Length
1.	"Dreams Come True" (꿈꾸는 마음으로; kkumkkuneun ma-eum-eulo; lit: With A Dreaming Heart)	Jinri (Full8loom); Exy	Jang Jun-ho (Full8loom); Jinri (Full8loom); Jake K	Jang Jun-ho (Full8loom); Jake K	3:51
2.	"Love O'Clock" (호두까기 인형; hodukkagi inhyeong; lit: Nutcracker)	어벤전승; Exy	어벤전승	어벤전승	3:16
3.	"Renaissance" (르네상스; leunesangseu)	Seo Ji-eum; Exy	e.one	e.one; 어벤전승	3:46
4.	"Starry Moment" (설레는 밤; seolleneun bam; lit: A Thrilling Night)	Won Young-heon; 동네형; 야마아트; Exy	Won Young-heon; 동네형; 야마아트	Won Young-heon; 동네형; 야마아트	3:21
5.	"Thawing" (겨울잠; gyeouljam; lit: Hibernation)	Exy; VINCENZO; Any Masingga; Fuxxy	Exy; VINCENZO; Any Masingga; Fuxxy	Any Masingga	3:31
6.	"Dreams Come True" (無限大夢想; Chinese ver.)	Jinri (Full8loom); Exy	Jang Jun-ho (Full8loom); Jinri (Full8loom); Jake K	Jang Jun-ho (Full8loom); Jake K	3:51
Total length:					21:12

== Charts ==
=== Weekly ===
Chart (2018)	Peak position
South Korean Albums (Gaon)	2

=== Monthly ===
Chart (2018)	Peak position
South Korean Albums (Gaon)	10

== Release history ==
Region	Date	Format	Label
South Korea	February 27, 2018	CD; digital download	Starship Entertainment; Yuehua Entertainment; LOEN Entertainment
Worldwide	February 27, 2018	Digital download	Starship Entertainment; Yuehua Entertainment; LOEN Entertainment
