= Neverland (WJSN EP) =

- Digital and Ver.I cover

EP by WJSN
- Released: June 9, 2020
- Recorded: April–May 2020
- Studio: Starship Studios
- Genre: Synthpop; electronica; citypop
- Length: 21:08
- Label: Starship; Kakao M

WJSN chronology
As You Wish (2019)	Neverland (2020)	Unnatural (2021)

Singles from Neverland
- 1. "Butterfly" Released: June 9, 2020

Neverland is the eighth extended play by South Korean-Chinese girl group WJSN. It was released on June 9, 2020, by Starship Entertainment and distributed by Kakao M. It contains a total of six songs, including the lead single "Butterfly".

Members Cheng Xiao, Meiqi and Xuanyi were not a part of the album release due to the scheduling conflicts in China.

== Background and release ==
On May 11, 2020, WJSN revealed through its official social media accounts that the group would release a new mini-album. The tracklist was revealed on May 17. Neverland and the music video for "Butterfly" were released on June 9.

== Composition ==
The title track was composed and co-written by Galactika, the music production team behind Itzy's biggest hits. This marks the first time they worked with Cosmic Girls.

Some of the members participated in the writing and production of some songs on the EP. Seola is credited as one of the writers and composers of "Our Garden"; while Exy is credited as a co-writer on all tracks and also as a co-composer on "Tra-la".

== Commercial performance ==
Neverland sold more than 47,000 copies in its first day of release, besting the group's personal record with As You Wish, which sold more than 34,000 copies in the first day of release. The EP sold almost 53,000 copies by its second day, also besting their first week sales set by As You Wish, which sold almost 50,000 copies in its first week.

The EP debuted at number 2 on the Gaon Album Chart, while the lead single "Butterfly" debuted at number 118 on the Gaon Digital Chart on the chart issue dated June 7–13, 2020. The single also peaked at number 81 on the Billboard K-pop Hot 100.

According to Gaon, the EP has sold 100,719 units, placing number 7 for the month of June 2020. It became the group's first release to sell over 100,000 copies as well as their best-selling release, surpassing As You Wish which has sold over 96,000 copies to date.

== Track listing ==
No.	Title	Lyrics	Music	Arrangement	Length
1.	"Butterfly"	GALACTIKA *; Exy	GALACTIKA *; AthenA (GALACTIKA *); woobin (GALACTIKA *)	Team GALACTIKA *	3:37
2.	"Hola"	KZ; B.O.; Exy	KZ; Nthonius; B.O.	Nthonius	3:29
3.	"Pantomime"	Kim Jin-hwan; Exy	Kim Jin-hwan	Kim Jin-hwan	3:28
4.	"Where You Are" (바램)	Iggy; C-no; Ung Kim; Exy	Iggy; C-no; Ung Kim	Iggy; C-no; Ung Kim	3:32
5.	"Tra-la" (불꽃놀이)	MAKECAKE36; Exy	MAKECAKE36; Exy	MAKECAKE36	3:57
6.	"Our Garden" (우리의 정원)	Seola; Jinli (Full8loom); Exy	Seola; Glory Face (Full8loom); Jinli (Full8loom); HARRY(Full8loom)	Glory Face (Full8loom); HARRY(Full8loom)	3:05
Total length:					21:08

== Charts ==
Sales chart performance for Neverland
Chart (2020)	Peak position
South Korean Albums (Gaon)	2

Sales and streaming chart performance for "Butterfly"
Song	Chart (2020)	Peak position
Butterfly	South Korea (Gaon)	118

== Awards and nominations ==
=== Accolades ===
Publication	List	Work	Rank	Ref.
Billboard	The 10 Best K-Pop Albums of 2020: Critics' Picks	Neverland	2	

=== Music program wins ===
Song	Program	Date
"Butterfly"
"Butterfly"	The Show (SBS MTV)	June 16, 2020
"Butterfly"	M Countdown (Mnet)	June 18, 2020

== Release history ==
Region	Date	Format	Label
South Korea	June 9, 2020	CD; digital download	Starship Entertainment; kakao M
Various	June 9, 2020	Digital download	Starship Entertainment; kakao M
