= As You Wish =

EP by WJSN
- Released: November 19, 2019
- Recorded: September–October 2019
- Genres: Synthpop; dancepop; retro; electronica
- Length: 24:36
- Labels: Starship; Kakao M

WJSN chronology
For the Summer (2019)	As You Wish (2019)	Neverland (2020)

Singles from As You Wish
- 1. "As You Wish" Released: November 19, 2019

Music video
- "As You Wish" on YouTube

As You Wish is the seventh extended play by South Korean-Chinese girl group WJSN. It was released on November 19, 2019, by Starship Entertainment and distributed by Kakao M. It contains a total of seven songs, including the lead single "As You Wish".

== Background and release ==
On October 24, 2019, WJSN revealed through its official social media accounts that the group would release a new mini-album. They published their promotional schedule on October 30, confirming the release date as November 19. The track listing was released on November 7. WJSN released the mini-album on November 19, and held a comeback showcase on V Live in commemoration.

== Commercial performance ==
As You Wish sold 49,410 copies in its first week of release according to Hanteo. It debuted at number 2 on the weekly Gaon Album Chart. The album went on to sell over 63,000 copies in the month of November 2019, thus in just 11 days, ranking 8th on the monthly Gaon Album Chart. As of April 2020, the album has sold 96,647 copies in South Korea.

The album's title track, "As You Wish" was charted at number 106 on the Gaon Digital Chart on the week ending November 23, 2019.

Despite being released in November 2019, "As You Wish" has topped the major South Korean real-time charts such as MelOn, Bugs, and Genie in the morning of New Year's Day for seven consecutive years from 2020 to 2026. This phenomenon has been attributed to its hopeful lyrics and the belief among MZ (Millennials and Generation Z) that the first song one listens to on New Year's Day determines their luck for the year.

== Track listing ==
No.	Title	Lyrics	Music	Arrangement	Length
1.	"As You Wish" (이루리)	KZ; D'DAY; Exy	KZ; Nthonius; 비오(B.O.)	Nthonius	3:15
2.	"Luckitty-Cat" (행운을 빌어)	진리(Full8loom); Exy	영광의 얼굴들(Full8loom); 진리(Full8loom)	영광의 얼굴들(Full8loom)	3:21
3.	"Lights Up" (야광별)	진솔; 정신해; Exy	Kiggen; 진솔; MOpin	진솔; MOpin	4:00
4.	"WW" (우와)	정호현(e.one); 이하진; Exy	정호현(e.one); 최현준	정호현(e.one); 최현준	3:47
5.	"Badaboom" (바다붐)	KZ; 비오(B.O.); Exy	KZ; Nthonius; 비오(B.O.)	Nthonius	3:24
6.	"Full Moon"	김규석; Exy	Dawon; 신쿵	신쿵	3:22
7.	"Don't Touch"	Exy; Big Brother; MAKECAKE36	Exy; Big Brother; MAKECAKE36	Big Brother; MAKECAKE36	3:27
Total length:					24:36

== Awards and nominations ==
=== Music program wins ===
Song	Program	Date	Ref
"As You Wish"	The Show (SBS MTV)	November 26, 2019	

== Charts ==
Weekly charts

Chart (2019)	Peak position
South Korean Albums (Gaon)	2

Monthly charts

Chart (2019)	Peak position
South Korean Albums (Gaon)	8

Year-end charts

Chart (2019)	Peak position
South Korean Albums (Gaon)	66

== Release history ==
Region	Date	Format	Label
South Korea	November 19, 2019	CD; digital download	Starship Entertainment; kakao M
Various	November 19, 2019	Digital download	Starship Entertainment; kakao M
