= WJ Stay? =

EP by WJSN
- Released: January 8, 2019
- Recorded: November–December 2018
- Genre: Synthpop; retro; ballad
- Language: Korean
- Label: Starship; Kakao M

WJSN chronology
WJ Please? (2018)	WJ Stay? (2019)	For the Summer (2019)

Singles from WJ Please?
- 1. "La La Love" Released: January 8, 2019

Music video
- "La La Love" on YouTube

WJ Stay? is the sixth extended play by South Korean-Chinese girl group WJSN. It was released on January 8, 2019, by Starship Entertainment and Yuehua Entertainment, and distributed by kakao M. It contains a total of seven songs, including the lead single "La La Love". This is the last album to feature former members Xuanyi, Cheng Xiao and Meiqi after they had departed from the group, following the expiration of their contracts, in March 2023.

== Background and release ==
On December 24, 2018, Starship Entertainment revealed through its official social media accounts that WJSN would release a new album on January 8, 2019.

It was reported that members Meiqi, Xuanyi, and Cheng Xiao will not participate in their album's promotions due to activities in China, but took part in the recording of "Memories".

WJSN members Exy and Dawon participated in the writing and production of the seventh track "Ujung". Exy is also credited as a co-writer on all tracks.

On the day of the album's release, the music video of the lead single "La La Love" was also released.

== Track listing ==
No.	Title	Lyrics	Music	Arrangement	Length
1.	"La La Love"	진리(Full8loom); Exy	영광의얼굴들(Full8loom); 진리(Full8loom); Jake K(Full8loom)	영광의 얼굴들(Full8loom); Jake K(Full8loom)	3:22
2.	"You Got"	진리(Full8loom); Exy	영광의 얼굴들(Full8loom); 진리(Full8loom); Jake K(Full8loom)	영광의 얼굴들(Full8loom); Jake K(Full8loom)	3:34
3.	"Star" (1억개의 별)	이하진; 최현준; 김승수; Exy	최현준; 김승수	최현준; 김승수	4:15
4.	"Memories" (그때 우리)	정호현(e.one); 최현준; 정민; Exy	정호현(e.one); 최현준; 정민	정호현(e.one); 최현준; 정민	3:09
5.	"Cantabile" (칸타빌레(노래하듯이))	키겐(Kiggen); MOpin; 김진솔; Exy	키겐(Kiggen); MOpin; 김진솔; Min	키겐(Kiggen); MOpin; 김진솔	3:24
6.	"12 O’clock"	Kriz; 브라더수(BrotherSu); Dart; P!Bee; Exy	dress; Kriz; 브라더수(BrotherSu); 글로잉독(glowingdog); Yenevara; 김연서; Dart; P!Bee	dress; Yenevara	3:35
7.	"Ujung" (우주정거장)	Dawon; 김규석; Exy	Dawon; 신쿵	신쿵	3:06
Total length:					24:25

== Charts ==
=== Weekly ===
Chart (2019)	Peak position
South Korean Albums (Gaon)	2

=== Monthly ===
Chart (2019)	Peak position
South Korean Albums (Gaon)	6

== Release history ==
Region	Date	Format	Label
South Korea	January 8, 2019	CD; digital download	Starship Entertainment; kakao M
Various	January 8, 2019	Digital download	Starship Entertainment; kakao M
