= Sequence (single album) =

- Digital cover

Single album by WJSN
- Released: July 5, 2022
- Recorded: June 2022
- Genre: Dance; Ballad
- Length: 12:55
- Language: Korean
- Label: Starship; Kakao

WJSN chronology
Unnatural (2021)	Sequence (2022)

Singles from Sequence
- 1. "Last Sequence" Released: July 5, 2022

Sequence is the first single album by South Korean girl group WJSN. It was released on July 5, 2022, by Starship Entertainment and distributed by Kakao Entertainment, almost 16 months after the group's latest release Unnatural. Marketed as a special single-album, the single album consists of 4 tracks, including "Last Sequence", serving as its lead single.

== Background and release ==
From March to June 2022, WJSN participated in the Mnet's reality-competition program Queendom 2, and finished as the winner. After the show, on June 3, Starship Entertainment announced that WJSN will be release the new music after a year and four months in July through a "coming soon" poster, uploaded on the group's social media platforms. The poster, which simulated the look of the ocean floor, also noted that the group is set to release new music on July 5 at 6:00 pm KST. Several concept photos, the tracklist, album previews and a music video teaser were released during the run-up to the release. Pre-sales for the physical album began on June 9. The album is available in CD, digital download and streaming formats. The physical album was released in 3 versions: Scene, Take One and Take Two. The album also came in jewel cases as well and there will be ten versions covering all ten members of the group.

== Composition ==
The title track "Last Sequence" is a pop-style dance song with a "wild bassline, drums and synths that makes the melody stand out even more" as it inherits the "splendid concept of WJSN". It contains lyrics that depict another beginning rather than the end. The song is composed in the key of G minor with 121 beats per minute and a running time of 3 minutes and 7 seconds.

The follow-up "Done" is a song with a deep house-base, and a "soft but gorgeous synthesizer sound on top". The third and the Queendom 2 winning song "Aura" is also re-recorded with the inclusion of Dawon who was on hiatus during the finale and it is the only track of the album that will be available for physical copies only. The album ends with "Stronger", a Pop-R&B track which was recorded by Dawon and Yeon-jung.

== Track listing ==
Track listing for Sequence
No.	Title	Lyrics	Music	Arrangement	Length
1.	"Last Sequence"	Lee Seu-ran; Exy	Ludwig Lindell; Ronnie Icon; Paulina Cerrilla	Ludwig Lindell	3:07
2.	"Done"	MakeCake36; Exy	MakeCake36; Exy	MakeCake36	3:04
4.	"Stronger" (Sung by Dawon and Yeonjung)	Gohst	Gohst; Dawon	Gohst	3:09
Total length:					9:20

Sequence – Physical edition
No.	Title	Lyrics	Music	Arrangement	Length
3.	"Aura" (album version)	Exy; MakeCake36	Exy; MakeCake36	MakeCake36	3:35
Total length:					12:55

== Charts ==
=== Weekly charts ===
Chart performance for Sequence
Chart (2022)	Peak position
South Korean Albums (Circle)	4

=== Monthly charts ===
Monthly chart performance for Sequence
Chart (2022)	Peak position
South Korean Albums (Circle)	12

== Release history ==
Release history and formats for Sequence
Region	Date	Format	Label
Various	July 5, 2022	CD; streaming; digital download	Starship; Kakao
