= Last Sequence =

Single by WJSN

from the album Sequence
- Language: Korean
- Released: July 5, 2022
- Genre: Electropop
- Length: 3:07
- Label: Starship; Kakao
- Composers: Ludwig Lindell; Ronnie Icon; Paulina Cerrilla
- Lyricists: Lee Seu-ran; Exy

WJSN singles chronology
"Unnatural" (2021)	"Last Sequence" (2022)	"Bloom Hour" (2026)

Music video
- "Last Sequence" on YouTube

"Last Sequence" is a song recorded by South Korean girl group WJSN for their first single album Sequence. It was released as the single album's lead single by Starship Entertainment on July 5, 2022.

== Background and release ==
Starship Entertainment announced that WJSN will be coming back after a year and four months. The group announced that they would be making their comeback next month through a "coming soon" poster that was released on the group's social media platforms. The poster, which simulated the look of the ocean floor, also noted that the group is set to release new music on July 5 at 6 pm KST. This is the group's first project since their last album Unnatural which was released on March 31, 2021. On May 6, Starship Entertainment announced the group's will be holding their fourth concert tour, titled '2022 WJSN Concert Wonderland' at the Olympic Hall on June 11 and 12. In addition, in Mnet's 'Queendom 2', which ended on 2 June, WJSN was chosen by global fans as the winner. The comeback show for the group which will be organized by Mnet will take place on July 5, 2022, coinciding the release

== Composition ==
"Last Sequence" was written by Lee Seu-ran and Exy, composed by Ludwig Lindell, Ronnie Icon, and Paulina Cerrilla who also handled the arrangement. Musically, the song is a pop-style dance song with a wild bassline, drums and synths that makes the melody stand out even more as it inherits the splendid concept of WJSN. It contains lyrics that depict another beginning rather than the end. The song is composed in the key of G minor with 121 beats per minute and a running time of 3 minutes and 7 seconds.

== Music video ==
The music video, directed by Kim Namsuk of Segaji, was released alongside the song by Starship Entertainment on July 5, 2022.

== Credits and personnel ==
Credits adapted from Melon.

- WJSN – vocals
- Lee Seu-ran – lyrics
- Exy – lyrics
- Ludwig Lindell - composition, arrangement
- Ronnie Icon – composition
- Paulina Cerrilla – composition

== Charts ==
Chart performance for "Last Sequence"
Chart (2022)	Peak position
South Korea (Circle)	132

== Release history ==
Release history for "Last Sequence"
Region	Date	Format	Label
Various	July 5, 2022	Digital download; streaming	Starship; Kakao
