= Unnatural (EP) =

- Digital and Ver.1 cover

EP by WJSN
- Released: March 31, 2021
- Recorded: December 2020 – January 2021
- Studio: Starship Studios
- Length: 20:43
- Label: Starship; Kakao

WJSN chronology
Neverland (2020)	Unnatural (2021)	Sequence (2022)

Singles from Unnatural
- 1. "Unnatural" Released: March 31, 2021

Unnatural is the ninth extended play by South Korean-Chinese girl group WJSN. It was released on March 31, 2021, by Starship Entertainment and distributed by Kakao Entertainment. It contains a total of six songs, including the lead single "Unnatural".

Members Cheng Xiao, Meiqi and Xuanyi were not a part of the album release due to scheduling conflicts in China.

== Background ==
On March 8, WJSN announced that they would make their comeback in late March. It was later announced that they would return with their ninth mini album Unnatural on March 31.

== Track listing ==
Unnatural track listing
No.	Title	Lyrics	Music	Arrangement	Length
1.	"Unnatural"	Kevin Oppa; Song Hee-jin (Solcire); Exy	Kevin Oppa; Song Hee-jin (Solcire); Chris Wahle	Chris Wahle	3:01
2.	"Last Dance"	Jinli (Full8loom)	Glory Face (Full8loom); Jinli (Full8loom); Jake K (ARTiffect)	Glory Face (Full8loom); Jake K (ARTiffect); HARRY (Full8loom)	3:16
3.	"Super Moon" (원하는 모든 걸)	MosPick; Exy	MosPick	MosPick	3:29
4.	"New Me"	Seola; Jinli (Full8loom); Exy	Glory Face (Full8loom); Jinli (Full8loom); Seola; HARRY (Full8loom)	Glory Face (Full8loom); HARRY (Full8loom)	3:29
5.	"Yalla" (음)	Makecake36; Exy	Makecake36; Exy	Makecake36	3:10
6.	"Rewind" (잊지 마)	KZ; Kim Hye-kwang; Jung Soo-min; Exy	KZ; Kim Hye-kwang; Jung Soo-min	KZ; Kim Hye-kwang; Jung Soo-min	4:15
Total length:					20:43

== Awards and nominations ==
=== Music program wins ===
Music program wins
Song	Program	Date	Ref
"Unnatural"	The Show (SBS MTV)	April 6, 2021	

== Charts ==
Chart performance for Unnatural
Chart (2021)	Peak position
South Korean Albums (Gaon)	3

Chart performance for "Unnatural"
Chart (2021)	Peak position
South Korea (Gaon)	126

== Release history ==
Release history for Unnatural
Region	Date	Format	Label
South Korea	March 31, 2021	CD; digital download; streaming	Starship Entertainment; Kakao Entertainment
Various	March 31, 2021	Digital download; streaming	Starship Entertainment; Kakao Entertainment
