= The Secret (WJSN EP) =

EP by WJSN
- Released: August 17, 2016
- Recorded: June–July 2016
- Venue: Seoul, South Korea
- Studio: Starship Studios
- Length: 24:56
- Label: Starship; LOEN
- Producer: e.one; Rovin; Giriboy

WJSN chronology
Would You Like? (2016)	The Secret (2016)	From. WJSN (2017)

Singles from The Secret
- 1. "Secret" Released: August 17, 2016

Music video
- "Secret" on YouTube

The Secret is the second extended play by South Korean-Chinese girl group WJSN. It marked their first album as a thirteen-member group since the addition of Yoo Yeon-jung in July 2016. It was released on August 17, 2016 by Starship Entertainment and distributed by LOEN Entertainment. To promote the EP, the group appeared on several South Korean music programs, including Music Bank and Inkigayo. The song "Secret" was released as the lead single from the EP with a Chinese version also included.

The EP was a commercial success peaking at number six on Gaon Album Chart. It has sold over 14,939 physical copies as of September 2016.

== Background and release ==
The Secret was released digitally on August 17, 2016 through several music portals, including iTunes for the global market. Two days later, on August 19, a physical album was released.

== Promotion ==
On August 17, WJSN held a showcase to celebrate the album release, performing for the first time the new songs, alongside past singles.

On August 18, the group held their first comeback stage on Mnet's M Countdown performing "BeBe" and "Secret". It was followed by KBS's Music Bank on August 19 and SBS's Inkigayo on August 21.

== Commercial performance ==
The Secret entered at number 7 on the Gaon Album Chart on the chart issue dated August 14–20, 2016. In its third week, the album climb back to the Top 10 at number 6, achieving a new peak.

The mini-album entered at number 15 on the Gaon Album Chart for the month of August 2016 with 8,629 physical copies sold. A month later, the mini-album peaked at number 14 for the month of September 2016 with 6,310 physical copies sold. It has sold over 14,939 copies.

The title track "Secret", entered and peaked at number 49 on the Gaon Digital Chart on the chart issue dated August 14–20, 2016 with 39,334 downloads sold. In its second week, the song fell to number 57 with 29,333 downloads sold and in its third week, the song fell to number 80 with 20,552 downloads sold. It has sold over 134k+ downloads as of September 2016.

== Track listing ==
Digital download

No.	Title	Writer(s)	Arrangement	Length
1.	"Secret" (비밀이야: bimiliya; lit: It Is A Secret)	e.one; Exy	e.one; Shinsadong Tiger	3:43
2.	"BeBe"	e.one; Exy	e.one	3:18
3.	"Would You Kiss Me?" (우주키스미: ujukiseumi)	김경; Robin	Robin	3:37
4.	"Prince" (짠!: jjan!)	e.one; Exy	e.one	3:21
5.	"ROBOT"	Giriboy	Giriboy	3:39
6.	"Good Night" (이층침대: icheungchimdae; lit: Bunk Bed)	Robin	Robin	3:33
7.	"Secret" (是秘密呀 (Chinese Ver.))	e.one; Exy	e.one	3:43
Total length:				24:56

== Charts ==
=== Weekly charts ===
Chart (2016)	Peak position
South Korea (Gaon Album Chart)	6

=== Monthly charts ===
Chart (2016)	Peak position
South Korea (Gaon Album Chart)	14

== Release history ==
Region	Date	Format	Label
Worldwide	August 17, 2016	Digital download	Starship Entertainment, LOEN Entertainment
South Korea	August 17, 2016	Digital download	Starship Entertainment, LOEN Entertainment
South Korea	August 19, 2016	CD	Starship Entertainment, LOEN Entertainment
