= Happy Moment =

- Digital and Happy version cover

Studio album by WJSN
- Released: June 7, 2017
- Recorded: February–May 2017
- Venues: Seoul, South Korea
- Studio: Starship Studios
- Genres: Bubblegum, Pop
- Length: 34:34
- Language: Korean
- Labels: Starship; LOEN

WJSN chronology
From. WJSN (2017)	Happy Moment (2017)	Dream your Dream (2018)

Singles from Happy Moment
- 1. "Happy" Released: June 7, 2017

Happy Moment is the first studio album by South Korean girl group WJSN. The album was released digitally and physically on June 7, 2017 by Starship Entertainment and distributed by LOEN Entertainment. It contains ten songs, including the promoted single "Happy". For the first time since debut, there is no Chinese version of the lead single available on this album, this is the first surprise album just after four months after the release of From. WJSN.

== Background and release ==
On May 18, 2017, a post to the official WJSN Facebook page announced a new comeback set for June 7 would be "coming soon," revealing the names of the lead single and the forthcoming album. Teasers for the album were released starting on May 24 until June 5. On June 7, 2017 at 6 p.m. KST, the music video for "Happy" was released on YouTube and Naver V LIVE and Happy Moment was made available for download on Melon in South Korea and iTunes worldwide. WJSN held a media showcase on the same day, which was also broadcast on V LIVE.

== Promotion ==
On June 8, WJSN had their first comeback stage on Mnet's M Countdown performing lead single "Happy" and album track "Miracle". This was followed by performances on KBS' Music Bank, MBC's Show! Music Core, SBS' Inkigayo, and MBC Music's Show Champion during their first week of music show promotions.

== Commercial performance ==
Happy Moment entered and peaked at number 3 on the Gaon Album Chart on the chart issue dated June 4–10, 2017. The album entered at number 9 on the chart for the month of June 2017, with 25,983 physical copies sold. The album has sold over 34,539 physical copies as of July 2017.

== Singles ==
"Happy" was released as the title track in conjunction with the album. A music video teaser was released on June 1, 2017. The official music video was released on June 7. The song entered at number 77 on the Gaon Digital Chart on the chart issue dated June 4–10, 2017, with 28,636 downloads sold.

== Track listing ==
No.	Title	Lyrics	Music	Arrangement	Length
1.	"Happy"	Black Eyed Pilseung; 전군	Black Eyed Pilseung; 전군; Kim Taewoo	라도	3:00
2.	"Miracle" (기적 같은 아이; gijeog gat-eun ai; lit: A Miracle Child)	e.one; Exy	e.one	e.one	3:43
3.	"Mr. BADBOY"	GALACTIKA	GALACTIKA; 아태나	GALACTIKA; 아태나	3:48
4.	"SUGAR"	GDLO (MonoTree)	GDLO (MonoTree)	GDLO (MonoTree)	3:05
5.	"Babyface"	Armadillo; Exy	Armadillo; 랑가	Armadillo; 랑가	3:19
6.	"Plop Plop" (퐁당퐁당; pongdangpongdang; lit: Fondant)	Go Dongkyun; 빨간머리앤; Exy	Go Dongkyun; 빨간머리앤	Go Dongkyun	3:14
7.	"Follow Me"	Shim Eunji; Exy	Shim Eunji; Coach & Sendo	Coach & Sendo	3:40
8.	"B.B.B.Boo"	E-TRIBE; Exy	E-TRIBE; Glory Face	E-TRIBE; Glory Face	3:35
9.	"Geeminy"	XEPY, Lee Jiwon (SAFARI M); Exy	XEPY, VO3E, 두리, Lee Kyungmi (SAFARI M)	VO3E; 두리	3:31
10.	"Closer to You" (지금 만나러 가요; jigeum mannaleo gayo; lit: Let’s Go Meet Now)	Park Sooseok; Park Eun-ooh	Park Sooseok; Park Eun-ooh	Park Sooseok; Kang Myungsoo	3:30
Total length:					34:34

== Release history ==
Region	Date	Format	Label
South Korea	June 7, 2017	CD, digital download	Starship Entertainment, LOEN Entertainment
Various	June 7, 2017	Digital download	Starship Entertainment, LOEN Entertainment
Taiwan	June 13, 2017	CD, digital download	Sony Music Taiwan
