= Yoo Yeon-jung =

South Korean singer (born 1999)

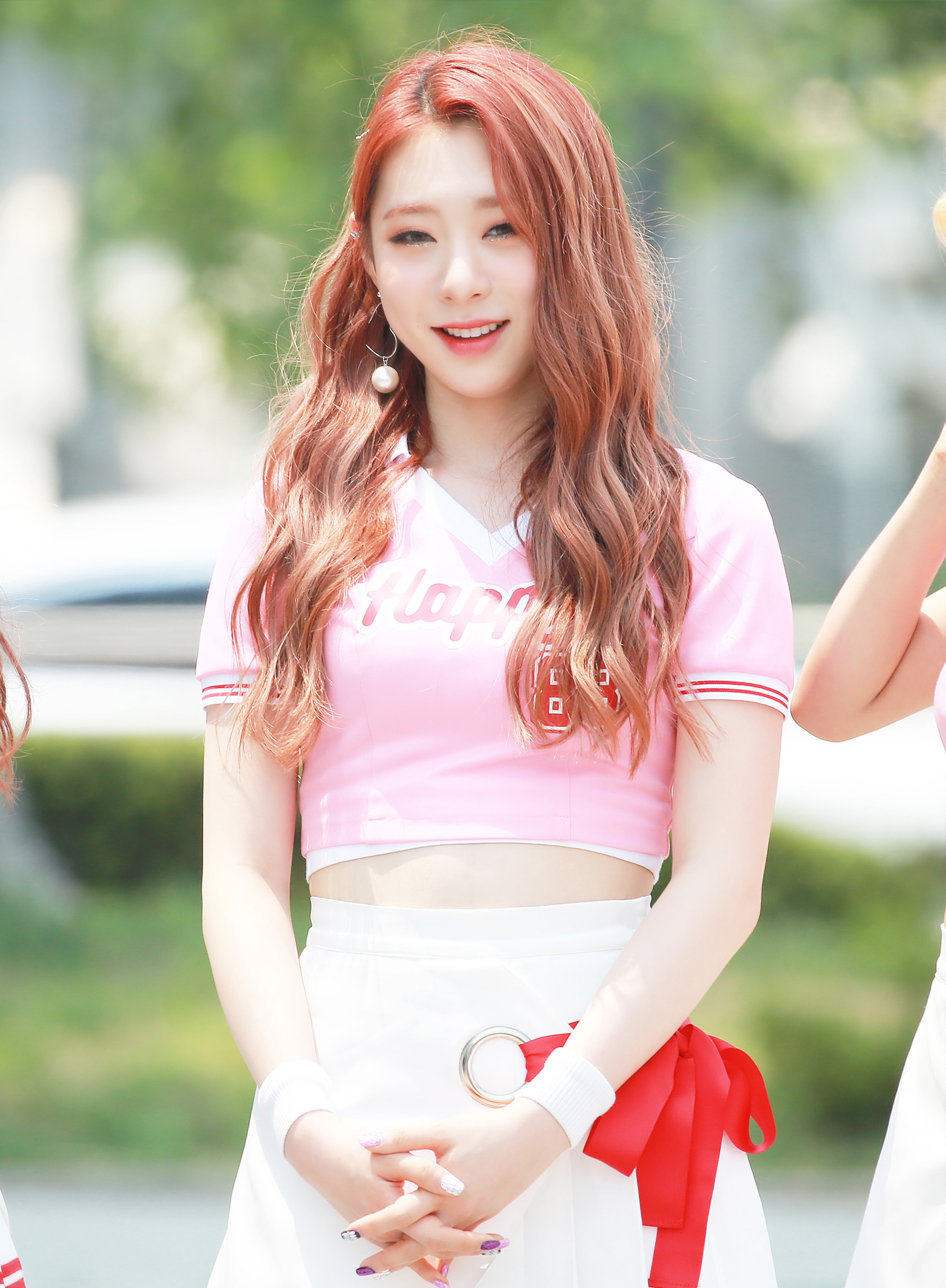
- Yoo in June 2017
- Born: August 3, 1999 (age 27); Gwangmyeong, Gyeonggi, South Korea
- Education: Dankook University
- Occupation: Singer
- Musical career
- Genres: K-pop
- Instrument: Vocals
- Years active: 2016–present
- Labels: Starship; Yuehua; YMC (Note: As a member of I.O.I only.)
- Member of: WJSN; Starship Planet
- Formerly of: I.O.I

Korean name
- Hangul: 유연정
- Hanja: 兪延靜
- RR: Yu Yeonjeong
- MR: Yu Yŏnjŏng

Yoo Yeon-jung (Korean: 유연정; born August 3, 1999), known mononymously as Yeonjung, is a South Korean singer signed under Starship Entertainment and Yuehua Entertainment. She is best known for being a member of the South Korean girl group WJSN, and for finishing 11th in the survival show Produce 101, making her a member of I.O.I.

== Early life and education ==
Yoo was born on August 3, 1999, in Gwangmyeong, South Korea. In 2017, Yoo was accepted through rolling admission into the musical theatre program of the Performance & Film Department at Dankook University.

== Career ==
=== 2016: Produce 101 and I.O.I ===
Yoo, together with Kim Tae-ha and Shim Chae-eun represented Starship Entertainment in the Mnet reality-survival program Produce 101, which aimed to form an eleven-member girl group that would promote for a year under YMC Entertainment. Yoo placed 11th with a total of 136,780 votes in the final episode and debuted as the last member of I.O.I.

On May 4, project girl group I.O.I debuted with the mini-album Chrysalis.

=== 2016–present: WJSN, V-1 and solo activities ===
While still an active member of I.O.I, Yoo was introduced as the thirteenth member of WJSN on July 11. Yoo made her official debut with WJSN on August 17, 2016. They released their second mini album The Secret with all 13 members. Yoo collaborated with Yoo Seung-woo on the track "I Will Be On Your Side" which was released on November 10, 2016. Yoo, together with bandmate Dawon, released the track "Fire & Ice" as part of The Snow Queen 3: Fire and Ice OST. The track was released on December 16, 2016. On May 31, 2017, Yoo released the soundtrack "You're Dazzling" for the television series Queen for Seven Days. Yoo collaborated with Brother Su and participated in the soundtrack of Love Playlist 2 with the track "Toy". She was featured in DinDin's "#Drive". "Meloholic" was released for the OCN drama Meloholic. She then collaborated with Maktub on the single "Marry You".

Yoo released two soundtracks for television series in 2018, "Your Name Is..." and "Stay With You" for The Undateables and Where Stars Land respectively. "Tell Me, Please" was released as the second part of the soundtrack of Melting Me Softly on October 14, 2019. Yoo also made her acting debut, making a cameo in A Korean Odyssey.

In September 2019, Yoo participated in the survival program show, V-1, to select the Vocal Queen among the various girl group members, where only the top 12 girl group members in votes would progress and perform on the show. Yoo eventually won the competition after defeating Dreamcatcher's Siyeon in the finals.

In September 2020, Yoo participated in MBN's Lotto Singer. She released "Spider Lily" on October 31, 2020, as part of the soundtrack of More Than Friends.

On May 4, 2021, Yoo and the members of I.O.I celebrated their 5th debut anniversary with a reunion live stream show called "Yes, I Love It!".

Yoo together with Dawon participated in Immortal Songs: Singing the Legend. They performed with Xitsuh and Koo Jun-yup and eventually became the final winner. On August 10, Yoo and Dawon released a cover song of Taeyeon's "Starlight" for NORAE-ing LIVE of Time. The pair went on to make an appearance on Jo Se-ho's Jo Se-ho's Wine Bar. Yoo collaborated with MJ of Sunny Side on the track "Guardian Angel", which was released on October 31, 2021.

=== 2022–present: Musical debut ===
Yoo, together with Seola, released a soundtrack "100 percent" in January 2022, as part of the soundtrack of Best Mistake 3. She is also set to make her musical debut as the female lead in Lizzie on March 24, 2022. Later, in July 2022, Yoo joined the stage play Crash Landing on You, an adaptation of the television series. Yoo will be playing the role of Seo Dan, the original role of Seo Ji-hye in the TV drama version.

== Discography ==
=== As lead artist ===
Title	Year	Peak chart position	Sales	Album
Title	Year	KOR	Sales	Album
"Stronger" (with Dawon) (Note: Song was released under WJSN, but is a solo track by Dawon and Yeonjung.)	2022	— (Note: "Stronger" did not enter the Circle Digital chart top 200, but appeared at number 93 on the component Download chart.)	—N/a	Sequence
"—" denotes releases that did not chart or were not released in that region.

=== As featured artist ===
Title	Year	Peak chart position	Sales	Album
Title	Year	KOR	Sales	Album
"#Drive" (#드라이브) (DinDin featuring Yoo Yeon-jung)	2017	—	—N/a	Non-album singles
"—" denotes releases that did not chart or were not released in that region.

=== Collaborations ===
Title	Year	Peak chart position	Sales	Album
Title	Year	KOR	Sales	Album
"I Will Be On Your Side" (내가 니편이 되어줄게) (with Yoo Seung-woo)	2016	—	KOR: 23,352+	Non-album singles
"Marry You" (with Maktub)	2017	92	KOR: 22,890+	Non-album singles
"Guardian Angel" (수호천사) (with MJ)	2021	—	—N/a	Non-album singles
"—" denotes releases that did not chart or were not released in that region.

=== Soundtrack appearances ===
Title	Year	Peak chart position	Sales	Album
Title	Year	KOR	Sales	Album
"Fire & Ice" (with Dawon)	2016	—	—N/a	The Snow Queen 3: Fire and Ice OST
"You're Dazzling" (눈부신 그대)	2017	—	—N/a	Queen for Seven Days OST Part 1
"Toy" (서툰 고백) (with Brother Su)	2017	—	—N/a	Love Playlist 2 OST Part 2
"Meloholic" (멜로홀릭)	2017	—	—N/a	Meloholic OST Part 4
"Your Name Is..." (너의 이름을...)	2018	—	—N/a	The Undateables OST Part 2
"Stay With You" (마음이 하는 일)	2018	—	—N/a	Where Stars Land OST Part 6
"Tell Me, Please" (꼭 말해줘)	2019	—	—N/a	Melting Me Softly OST Part 2
"Spider Lily" (피안화)	2020	—	—N/a	More Than Friends OST Part 7
"Drawing of the Beginning" (시작의 드로잉)	2021	—	—N/a	My Roommate Is a Gumiho OST Part 3
"100 percent" (with Seola)	2022	—	—N/a	Best Mistake 3 OST Part 1
"Secret Love"	2023	—	—N/a	Webtoon 'I need a Bride'(신부가 필요해) OST Part 2
"Somebody Like"	2023	—	—N/a	Not Others OST Part 4
"LEMON"	2024	—	—N/a	Branding In Seongsudong'(브랜딩인성수동) OST Part 4
"—" denotes releases that did not chart or were not released in that region.

== Filmography ==
=== Television series ===
Year	Title	Role	Notes	Ref.
2017	A Korean Odyssey	Lee Da-in	Cameo (Episode 1)	

=== Television shows ===
Year	Title	Role	Notes	Ref.
2016	Produce 101	Contestant	Survival show that determined I.O.I members Finished 11th	
2019	V-1	Contestant	Winner	
2020	Lotto Singer (로또싱어)	Contestant		

== Theatre ==
Year	Title	Korean Title	Role	Notes	Ref.
2022	Lizzie	리지	Alice Russell	Theatrical debut	
2022	Crash Landing on You	사랑의 불시착	Seo Dan		
2023	Aloha, My Mums	알로하, 나의 엄마들	Bu Deul		
2024	Natasha, Pierre & the Great Comet of 1812	그레이트 코멧	Natasha		

== Awards and nominations ==
Name of the award ceremony, year presented, category, nominee of the award, and the result of the nomination
Award ceremony	Year	Category	Nominee / Work	Result	Ref.
Korea Musical Awards	2023	Best Newcomer Award (Female)	Lizzie	Nominated	
