= For the Summer =

- Digital and Blue version cover

EP by WJSN
- Released: June 4, 2019
- Recorded: April–May 2019
- Genre: Electropop; disco; bubblegum pop
- Length: 16:20
- Language: Korean
- Label: Starship; Kakao M

WJSN chronology
WJ Stay? (2019)	For the Summer (2019)	As You Wish (2019)

Singles from For the Summer
- 1. "Boogie Up" Released: June 4, 2019

Music video
- "Boogie Up" on YouTube

For the Summer is the first summer special album by South Korean-Chinese girl group WJSN. It was released on June 4, 2019, by Starship Entertainment and distributed by Kakao M. It contains a total of five songs, including the lead single "Boogie Up".

== Background and release ==
On May 19, 2019, WJSN revealed through its official social media accounts that the group would release a special album on June 4, 2019.

On the day of the album's release, the music video of the lead single "Boogie Up" was also released.

== Commercial performance ==
For the Summer debuted at number one on South Korea's Gaon Album Chart on the week dated June 8, 2019, becoming the group's first number one album in the country. It ranked at number seventy-one on the Year-End chart with 78,555 copies sold in 2019.

The lead single "Boogie Up" peaked at number 133 on the Gaon Digital Chart and at number 60 on the Billboard K-pop Hot 100.

== Tracklisting ==
No.	Title	Lyrics	Music	Arrangement	Length
1.	"Boogie Up"	달리; Exy	Wonderkid; 신쿵	Wonderkid; 신쿵	3:03
2.	"Oh My Summer" (눈부셔)	JQ; Lee Ji Hye (makeumine works); Exy	OLLIPOP; Caesar & Loui; Hayley Aitken	OLLIPOP; Daniel Caesar	3:27
3.	"My Type"	진리(FULL8LOOM)	영광의 얼굴들(FULL8LOOM); 진리(FULL8LOOM); JAKE K(FULL8LOOM)	영광의 얼굴들(FULL8LOOM), JAKE K(FULL8LOOM)	3:11
4.	"Let's Dance" (우리끼리)	MosPick; Exy	MosPick	MosPick	3:08
5.	"Sugar Pop"	LOVEY; Exy	OLLIPOP; Caesar & Loui; Hayley Aitken	OLLIPOP; Caesar & Loui	3:23
Total length:					16:20

== Charts ==
=== Weekly charts ===
Chart (2019)	Peak position
South Korean Albums (Gaon)	1

=== Year-end charts ===
Chart (2019)	Position
South Korean Albums (Gaon)	71

== Awards and nominations ==
=== Music program wins ===
Song	Program	Date	Ref
"Boogie Up"
"Boogie Up"	The Show (SBS MTV)	June 11, 2019	
"Boogie Up"	The Show (SBS MTV)	June 18, 2019	
"Boogie Up"	Show Champion (MBC Music)	June 19, 2019	
"Boogie Up"	M Countdown (Mnet)	June 13, 2019	

== Release history ==
Region	Date	Format	Label
South Korea	June 4, 2019	CD; digital download	Starship Entertainment; kakao M
Various	June 4, 2019	Digital download	Starship Entertainment; kakao M
