= WJ Please? =

EP by WJSN
- Released: September 19, 2018
- Recorded: July–August 2018
- Studio: Starship Studios
- Length: 22:07
- Label: Starship; Kakao M

WJSN chronology
Dream Your Dream (2018)	WJ Please? (2018)	WJ Stay? (2019)

Singles from WJ Please?
- 1. ""Save Me, Save You"" Released: September 19, 2018

WJ Please? is the fifth extended play by South Korean-Chinese girl group WJSN. It was released on September 19, 2018, by Starship Entertainment and distributed by Kakao M. It contains a total of six songs, including the lead single "Save Me, Save You".

== Background and release ==
On September 3, Starship Entertainment revealed that WJSN would release a new album on September 19.

Members Meiqi, Xuanyi, and Cheng Xiao did not participate in the album's promotions due to activities in China, but took part in the recordings of "Hurry Up" and "You & I".

On the day of the album's release, the music video of the lead single "Save Me, Save You" was also released.

== Track listing ==
No.	Title	Lyrics	Music	Arrangement	Length
1.	"Save Me, Save You" (부탁해)	Jinri (Full8loom); Exy	Jang Jun-ho (Full8loom); Jinri (Full8loom); Jake K	Jang Jun-ho (Full8loom); Jake K	3:44
2.	"You, You, You" (너, 너, 너)	Jinri (Full8loom); Exy	Jang Jun-ho (Full8loom); Jinri (Full8loom)	Jang Ju-ho	3:41
3.	"I-yah" (아이야)	Seo Ji-eum; Exy	Choi Hyeon-jun; Kim Seung-soo	Choi Hyeon-jun; Kim Seung-soo	3:47
4.	"Masquerade" (가면무도회)	어벤전승; Jeong Jae-yeob; Exy	어벤전승; Jeong Jae-yeob	어벤전승; Jeong Jae-yeob	4:13
5.	"Hurry Up" (서둘러)	e.one; LEL; Exy	e.one; LEL	e.one; LEL	3:01
6.	"You & I" (2월의 봄)	Exy; VINCENZO; Any Masingga; Fuxxy	Exy; VINCENZO; Any Masingga; Fuxxy	Any Masingga; Fuxxy	3:41
Total length:					22:11

== Charts ==
=== Weekly ===
Chart (2018)	Peak position
South Korean Albums (Gaon)	3
US World Albums (Billboard World Albums)	14

=== Monthly ===
Chart (2018)	Peak position
South Korean Albums (Gaon)	8

== Awards and nominations ==
Year	Award	Category	Result
2019	33rd Golden Disc Awards	Disc Daesang	Nominated

=== Music program wins ===
Song	Program	Date	Ref
"Save Me Save You"
"Save Me Save You"	The Show (SBS MTV)	October 2, 2018	

== Release history ==
Region	Date	Format	Label
South Korea	September 19, 2018	CD; digital download	Starship Entertainment; kakao M
Various	September 19, 2018	Digital download	Starship Entertainment; kakao M
