= Would You Like? =

EP by WJSN
- Released: February 25, 2016
- Recorded: December 2015 – January 2016
- Venue: Seoul, South Korea
- Studio: Starship Studios
- Genre: K-pop; dance
- Language: Korean
- Label: Starship; LOEN

WJSN chronology
| Would You Like? (2016) | The Secret (2016) |

Singles from Would You Like?
- 1. "Mo Mo Mo" Released: February 25, 2016; 2. "Catch Me" Released: March 9, 2016

Would You Like? is the debut extended play by South Korean girl group WJSN. The album was released digitally and physically on February 25, 2016 by Starship Entertainment and distributed by LOEN Entertainment. The album contains six tracks including the lead single, "MoMoMo" and second single "Catch Me", which was composed by Kim Eana and is a blend of several different genres.

The mini-album was a commercial success peaking at number 7 on the Gaon Album Chart. It has sold over 12,701 physical copies as of May 2016.

Only 12 out of the 13 members were included in this album as Yoo Yeon-jung had yet to join the group. She joined the group in July 2016.

== Background and release ==
On mid-January, 2016, Starship Entertainment launched the band's official website and announced via SNS that the group would debut with the mini-album "Would You Like?" and two title-track "MoMoMo" and "Catch Me".

Teasers featuring each of the members for their music video were released from February 17 to 23, 2016. On February 25, the song's music video were released online and through the Naver V App.

== Promotion ==
WJSN held a live showcase on February 25, where they performed "MoMoMo" and second single track "Catch Me".

The group started promoting their title track "MoMoMo" with the b-side "Catch Me" on music shows on February 25. They first performed the songs on Mnet's M! Countdown, followed by performances on KBS' Music Bank, MBC's Show! Music Core and SBS's Inkigayo.

== Commercial performance ==
Would You Like? entered and peaked at number 7 on the Gaon Album Chart on the chart issue dated February 21–27, 2016. In its second week, the EP fell to number 45, dropping the chart the following week.

The mini-album entered at number 23 on the Gaon Album Chart for the month of February 2016, peaking at number 18 a month later on March. The EP charted for four consecutive months selling over 12,701 physical copies as of May 2016.

== Track listing ==
| No. | Title | Lyrics | Music | Length |
|---|---|---|---|---|
| 1. | "Space Cowgirl" (Intro) | | Seo Young-bae | 1:12 |
| 2. | "Mo Mo Mo" (모모모) | Kim Eana, Exy | Kim Do-hoon, Seo Young-bae | 3:42 |
| 3. | "Catch Me" | Seo Ji-eum | Shockbit, Deekei, Bekuh Boom | 3:14 |
| 4. | "Tick-Tock" | Seo Ji-eum | 2Face | 3:28 |
| 5. | "Take My Breath" | Nam Gi-sang, Kwon Seon-ik, Park Gi-hyun | Nam Gi-sang, Kwon Seon-ik, Kim Jae-woong, Park Sung-jin | 3:44 |
| 6. | "MoMoMo" (Chinese Version) | Kim Eana, Exy | Kim Do-hoon, Seo Young-bae | 3:15 |
| Total length: | | | | 19:05 |

== Charts ==
=== Weekly charts ===
| Chart (2016) | Peak position |
|---|---|
| South Korea (Gaon Digital Chart) | 7 |

=== Monthly charts ===
| Chart (2016) | Peak position |
|---|---|
| South Korea (Gaon Album Chart) | 18 |

== Release history ==
| Region | Date | Format | Label |
| Worldwide | February 25, 2016 | Digital download | Starship Entertainment |
| South Korea | February 25, 2016 | CD, music download | Starship Entertainment |
