= From. WJSN =

EP by WJSN
- Released: January 4, 2017
- Recorded: November–December 2016
- Length: 21:01
- Label: Starship; LOEN
- Producer: Glory Face; Yang Gaeng; Jinli; Long Candy; SEION; Rovin; Bronze; Brother Su; Seo Jieum

WJSN chronology
The Secret (2016)	From. WJSN (2017)	Happy Moment (2017)

Singles from From. WJSN
- 1. "I Wish" Released: January 4, 2017

Music video
- "I Wish" on YouTube

From. WJSN (Korean: From. 우주소녀) is the third extended play by South Korean-Chinese girl group WJSN. It was released on January 4, 2017, by Starship Entertainment and distributed by LOEN Entertainment. To promote the EP, the group appeared on several South Korean music programs, including Music Bank and Inkigayo. The song "I Wish" was released as the lead song from the EP with a Chinese version included.

The EP was a commercial success, reaching number 4 on the Gaon Album Chart.

== Release ==
From. WJSN was released on January 4, 2017, at midnight KST though several music portals, including Melon in South Korea.

== Promotion ==
In order to promote the EP, the group performed "I Wish" on several music programs. They started their comeback stage on Mnet's M Countown on January 5, followed by KBS's Music Bank on January 6, MBC's Show! Music Core on January 7 and SBS's Inkigayo on January 8.

== Commercial performance ==
From. WJSN entered at number 6 on the Gaon Album Chart on the chart issue dated January 1–7, 2017. In its second week, the mini-album fell to number 14. But in its fifth week, it rose to number four, their highest placement since their debut.

The title track, "I Wish", entered at number 49 on the Gaon Digital Chart on the chart issue dated January 1–7, 2017, with 41,923 downloads sold in its first four days.

== Track listing ==
Digital download
No.	Title	Lyrics	Music	Arrangement	Length
1.	"I Wish" (너에게 닿기를; neoege dahgileul; lit: To Reach You)	Glory Face; Seo Jieum; Jinli; Long Candy; Exy	Glory Face; Yang Gaeng; Jinli; Long Candy	Glory Face; Yang Gaeng	3:38
2.	"Baby Come to Me"	SEION; Long Candy; Exy	SEION; Long Candy	Tenzo & Tasco	3:07
3.	"Say Yes" (주세요; juseyo; lit: Please)	Yang Gaeng; Kim Soojung; Exy	Yang Gaeng	Yang Gaeng	3:36
4.	"Perfect!" (최애; choeae; lit: Choi Ae)	Rovin	Rovin; Bronze	Rovin; Bronze	3:34
5.	"Hug U" (이리와; iliwa; lit: Come On)	Brother Su; Exy	Brother Su	Brother Su	3:28
6.	"I Wish" (靠近你的心) (Chinese Ver.)	Glory Face; Seo Jieum; Jinli; Long Candy; Exy	Glory Face; Seo Jieum; Jinli; Long Candy	Glory Face; Yang Gaeng	3:38
Total length:					22:01

== Charts ==
Chart (2017)	Peak position
South Korea (Gaon Album Chart)	4
