= WJSN =

South Korean girl group

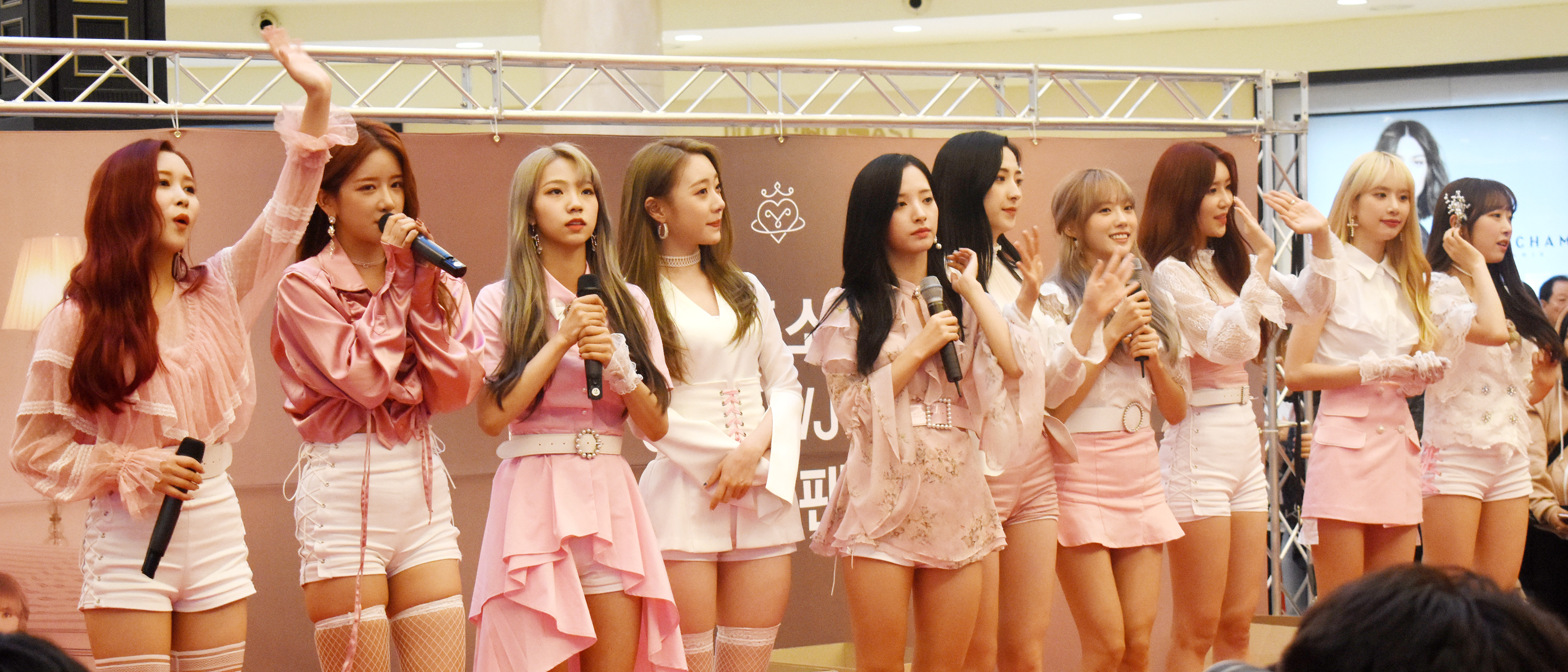
- WJSN in September 2018; From left to right: Dayoung, Exy, Yeoreum, Yeonjung, Bona, Eunseo, Luda, Dawon, Seola, Soobin

Background information
- Also known as: Cosmic Girls
- Origin: Seoul, South Korea
- Genres: K-pop; synthpop
- Years active: 2016–2023; 2026–present
- Labels: Starship; YH
- Spinoffs: WJSN Chocome; WJSN The Black; Starship Planet
- Members: Seola; Bona; Exy; Soobin; Luda; Dawon; Eunseo; Yeoreum; Dayoung; Yeonjung
- Past members: Xuanyi; Cheng Xiao; Meiqi
- Website: Official website

WJSN (Korean: 우주소녀; RR: Ujusonyeo; Chinese: 宇宙少女), also known as Cosmic Girls, is a South Korean girl group managed by Starship Entertainment, composed of ten members: Seola, Bona, Exy, Soobin, Luda, Dawon, Eunseo, Yeoreum, Dayoung, and Yeonjung. WJSN was originally a thirteen-member group; Xuanyi, Cheng Xiao, and Meiqi departed from the group on March 3, 2023.

The group originally formed through partnership by Starship Entertainment and YH Entertainment, consists of twelve-member made their debuted on February 25, 2016, with the extended play Would You Like?. A thirteenth member, Yeonjung, joined in August 2016, following the release of their second EP The Secret. The group continue to promote as ten-member group with the release of their fifth EP WJ Please? in September 2018, following member from YH Entertainment's Xuanyi, Cheng Xiao, and Meiqi did not participate in the comeback due to their individual activities in China and not participate in the group's activities since then until their contract expired in March 2023.

== History ==
=== 2015–2016: Formation and debut ===
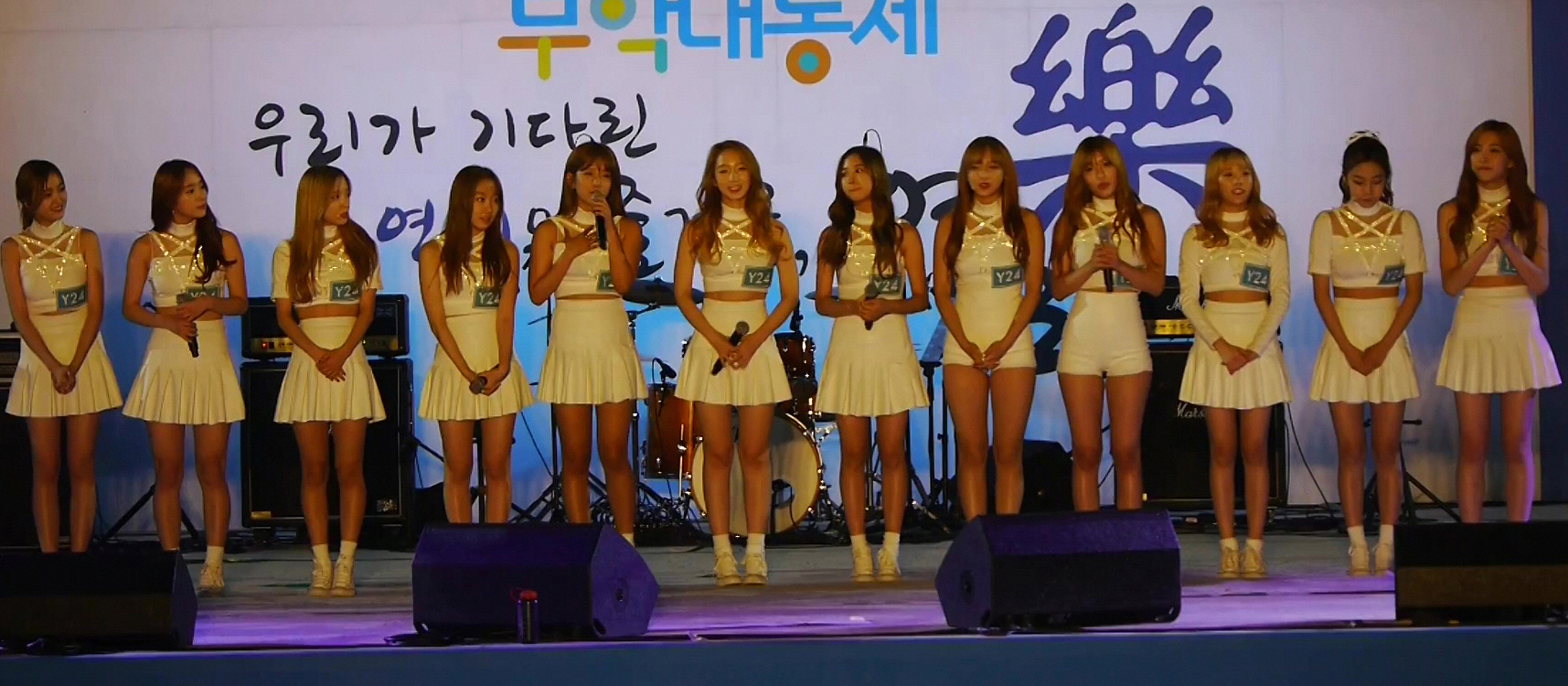
Cosmic Girls photographed during the closing ceremony of Yonsei University on May 26, 2016.

On December 4, 2015, Starship Entertainment and Yuehua Entertainment launched a 12-member girl group called WJSN, where the Korean and Chinese members were divided into different subunits. On December 10, the first unit, Wonder Unit, was announced (Cheng Xiao, Bona, and Dayoung). On December 17, the second three-member unit (Xuanyi, Eunseo, and Yeoreum) was introduced: Joy Unit. On December 21, WJSN's Wonder and Joy Units released a Christmas cover of "All I Want For Christmas Is You" by Mariah Carey. On December 24, the third unit, Sweet Unit, was announced (Seola, Exy, and Soobin). On December 31, the final unit was announced: Natural Unit (Meiqi, Luda, and Dawon).

WJSN debuted on February 25, 2016, with the release of their debut mini album Would You Like?, including the title tracks "Mo Mo Mo" and "Catch Me". The group held their debut stage on the February 25th episode of M Countdown with "Catch Me" and "Mo Mo Mo". On July 11, Starship Entertainment confirmed that I.O.I's Yoo Yeon-jung would be joining the group. In August 2016, Seola, Exy, Soobin, Eunseo, Cheng Xiao, Yeoreum, and Dayoung teamed up with label mate Monsta X to form the unit Y-Teen. It was a project unit group that promoted as CF models for KT’s phone fare service and would release EPs, music videos, and various entertainment content. On August 17, WJSN released their second mini album The Secret with all 13 members.

=== 2017–2018: From. WJSN, Happy Moment, Dream Your Dream, WJ Please? and Chinese members hiatus ===
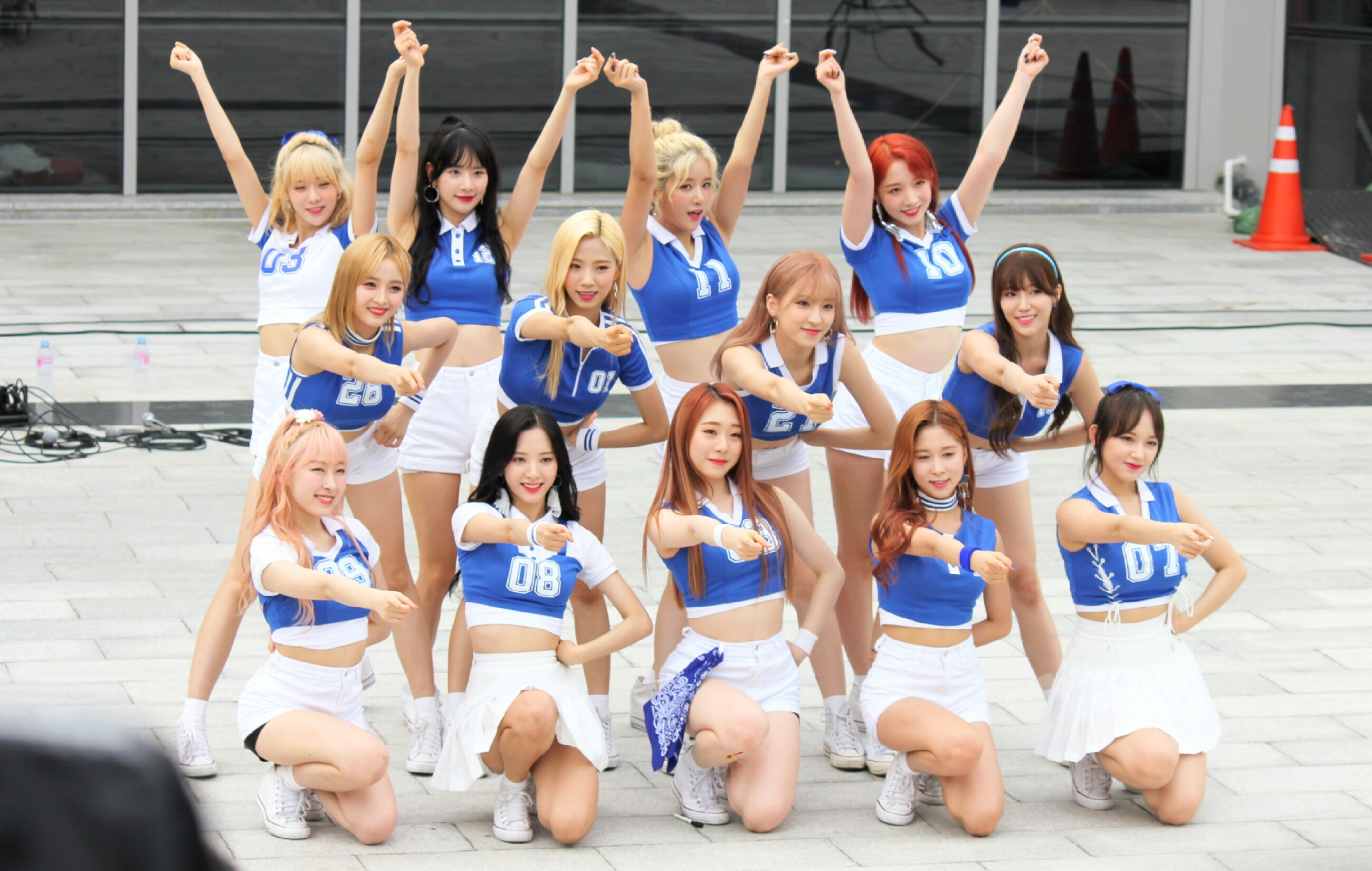
Cosmic Girls in 2017

On January 4, WJSN released their third mini album From. WJSN. The EP contains six tracks including the title track "I Wish". WJSN held their first solo concert, "Would You Like - Happy Moment," from May 19–20 at the Blue Square Samsung Card Hall. A total of 2,000 fans gathered in two days. WJSN's first full-length album, Happy Moment, was released on June 7, with a total of ten tracks including the lead single "Happy". The album ranked number 1 on Hanteo's daily and real-time charts after release.

On February 27, 2018, WJSN released their fourth mini album Dream Your Dream, which consists of six tracks including the lead single "Dreams Come True". Their comeback showcase was held at the Yes24 Live Hall on the same day as the album's release. On June 1, WJSN and Weki Meki formed a project group called WJMK and released a digital single "Strong". Two Chinese members, Meiqi and Xuanyi, participated in the Chinese version of survival show Produce 101 during the first half of 2018. The survival show concluded with Meiqi ranking 1st and Xuanyi ranking 2nd, making them both members of the temporary girl group Rocket Girls 101. On September 19, WJSN returned with their fifth mini album WJ Please? and the title track "Save Me, Save You". The Chinese members, Cheng Xiao, Meiqi and Xuanyi, did not participate in the comeback and the group continued as ten members. Meiqi and Xuanyi were preparing to debut with Rocket Girls 101, while Cheng Xiao was filming Legend of Awakening, a Chinese historical fantasy drama as the second lead actress, which would be her acting debut. On October 2, the group received their first music show win of their career with "Save Me, Save You" on SBS MTV's The Show.

=== 2019–2020: WJ Stay?, As You Wish and Neverland ===
On January 8, 2019, WJSN released their sixth mini album WJ Stay?, which consists of seven tracks including the lead single "La La Love". The group continued to promote as ten members, with the Chinese members, Cheng Xiao, Meiqi and Xuanyi, unable to participate in the comeback due to prior commitments. WJSN held their second solo concert, "Would You Stay - Secret Box," from March 2–3 at the Blue Square Imarket Hall. WJSN released their special album For the Summer on June 4, which consists of five tracks including the lead single "Boogie Up". In August, WJSN held their first concert tour titled WJSN 1st Mini Live 2019 "Would You Like?" Zepp Tour in Japan, starting on August 17 in Zepp DiverCity in Tokyo. WJSN released their seventh mini album As You Wish on November 19, which consists of seven tracks including the lead single "As You Wish".

In 2020, WJSN had planned to hold their third concert titled WJSN Concert "Obliviate," starting on February 22, 2020, at the Olympic Hall in Seoul, South Korea and finishing on March 22, 2020, at the Toyosu PIT in Tokyo, Japan. However, due to the COVID-19 pandemic, the concert was postponed. WJSN released their eighth mini album Neverland, including the title track "Butterfly," on June 9. On September 23, WJSN announced the formation of the new sub-unit WJSN Chocome, featuring members Soobin, Luda, Yeoreum, and Dayoung. They released their debut single album Hmph!, and its title track with the same name on October 7.

=== 2021–2024: Unnatural, The Black, competition show, and Chinese members departure ===
WJSN released their ninth extended play Unnatural, with the title track of the same name on March 31, 2021. On April 26, WJSN announced the formation of their second sub-unit WJSN The Black, featuring members Seola, Exy, Bona and Eunseo, along with announcing their first single album My Attitude and its title track "Easy", which was released on May 12. On September 23, WJSN released the promotional single "Let Me In" through Universe Music for the mobile application Universe.

On January 5, 2022, WJSN Chocome released their second single album Super Yuppers!. On February 21, 2022, it was confirmed that WJSN will be participating in the second season of Mnet competition show Queendom, which ran from March to June 2022. Dawon did not participate in the show, while Bona joined in the third round due to scheduling conflicts with her drama Twenty-Five Twenty-One. WJSN was announced as the winners of Queendom 2 at its live finale on June 2. On May 6, Starship Entertainment announced the group's would be holding their fourth concert tour, titled '2022 WJSN Concert Wonderland' at the Olympic Hall on June 11 and 12. Following their win on Queendom 2, it was announced that WJSN would be making a comeback on July 5 with their special single album Sequence, with the title track "Last Sequence". On November 18, Starship Entertainment announced a fan concert '2023 WJSN Fan-Con Codename: Ujung' that took place on January 7 and 8, 2023.

On March 3, 2023, Starship Entertainment announced that Xuanyi, Cheng Xiao, and Meiqi had departed from WJSN following the expiration of their contracts. In the same announcement, it was also announced that Luda and Dawon chose not to renew their contracts, but did not specify whether they would remain in the group, while the rest of the members renewed their contracts with the company. On March 13, 2023, Soobin clarified that Luda and Dawon have not left WJSN, followed by an official statement by Starship Entertainment backing up the information.

In a 2024 interview with South Korean news outlet Newsen, Yeonjung revealed that there "aren't any concrete plans" for a group comeback.

=== 2026–present: Reunion for tenth anniversary ===
On February 25, 2026, WJSN released a digital single "Bloom Hour", with the lead song of the same name and B-side song "Mirror", to celebrate their tenth anniversary. Seola and Eunseo did not renew their contracts with Starship Entertainment in September 2026.

== Members ==
=== Current ===
- Seola (설아): vocalist
- Bona (보나): dancer
- Exy (엑시): leader, rapper
- Soobin (수빈): vocalist
- Luda (루다): dancer
- Dawon (다원): vocalist
- Eunseo (은서): rapper
- Yeoreum (여름): dancer
- Dayoung (다영): vocalist
- Yeonjung (연정): vocalist

=== Former ===
- Xuanyi (선의): dancer
- Cheng Xiao (성소): dancer
- Meiqi (미기): dancer

== Subunits ==
- WJSN Chocome (우주소녀 쪼꼬미): Soobin, Luda, Yeoreum, Dayoung
- WJSN The Black (우주소녀 더블랙): Seola, Bona, Exy, Eunseo
- Wonder Unit (원더 유닛): Bona, Cheng Xiao, Dayoung
- Joy Unit (조이 유닛): Xuanyi, Eunseo, Yeoreum
- Sweet Unit (스윗 유닛): Exy, Seola, Soobin
- Natural Unit (내추럴 유닛): Luda, Dawon, Meiqi, Yeonjung

== Discography ==
- Happy Moment (2017)

== Filmography ==
=== Reality shows ===
Year	Title	Note	Ref.
2016	Would You Like Girls (My Cosmic Diary)	Yeonjung joined WJSN reality show on the last episode.	
2017	Living Together in Empty Room	Home sharing concept with chef Oh Se-deuk.	
2017	Watch WJSN Show		
2022	Queendom 2	Contestant/Winner	
2022	TMT Cosmic Girl	Short entertainment program	

=== Web shows ===
Year	Title	Role	Ref.
2021	The Secret of the Grand Mansion: The Missing Girls	Themselves	

== Concert and tours ==
=== Headlining concerts ===
- WJSN 1st Concert "Would You Like – Happy Moment" (2017)
- WJSN Concert "Would You Stay – Secret Box" (2019)
- 2022 WJSN Concert "Wonderland" (2022)
- 2023 WJSN Fan Concert "Codename:Ujung" (2023)

==== WJSN 1st Concert "Would You Like – Happy Moment" ====
Date	City	Country	Venue	Attendance
May 19, 2017	Seoul	South Korea	Blue Square Samsung Card Hall	2,000
May 20, 2017	Seoul	South Korea	Blue Square Samsung Card Hall	2,000

==== WJSN Concert "Would You Stay – Secret Box" ====
Date	City	Country	Venue
March 2, 2019	Seoul	South Korea	Blue Square Imarket Hall
March 3, 2019	Seoul	South Korea	Blue Square Imarket Hall

==== 2020 WJSN Concert "Obliviate" (Canceled) ====
Date	City	Country	Venue
February 22, 2020	Seoul	South Korea	Olympic Hall
February 23, 2020	Seoul	South Korea	Olympic Hall
March 14, 2020	Osaka	Japan	Cool Japan Park Osaka WW Hall
March 15, 2020	Osaka	Japan	Cool Japan Park Osaka WW Hall
March 21, 2020	Tokyo	Japan	Toyosu PIT
March 22, 2020	Tokyo	Japan	Toyosu PIT

==== 2022 WJSN Concert "Wonderland" ====
Date	City	Country	Venue / Network
June 11, 2022	Seoul	South Korea	Olympic Hall
June 12, 2022	Seoul	South Korea	Olympic Hall, Beyond LIVE

2023 WJSN Fan Concert "Codename:Ujung"

Date	City	Country	Venue
January 7, 2023	Seoul	South Korea	Blue Square Master Hall
January 8, 2023	Seoul	South Korea	Blue Square Master Hall, Beyond LIVE

=== Headlining tours ===
- WJSN 1st Mini Live "Would You Like?" 2019 Zepp Tour in Japan (2019)

==== WJSN 1st Mini Live "Would You Like?" 2019 Zepp Tour in Japan ====
Date	City	Country	Venue
August 17, 2019	Tokyo	Japan	Zepp DiverCity
August 24, 2019	Osaka	Japan	Zepp Osaka Bayside
August 25, 2019	Nagoya	Japan	Zepp Nagoya

== Awards and nominations ==
Name of the award ceremony, year presented, category, nominee of the award, and the result of the nomination
Award ceremony	Year	Category	Nominee / Work	Result	Ref.
Asia Artist Awards	2016	Most Popular Artists (Singer) – Top 50	WJSN	48th	
Asia Artist Awards	2016	Rising Star Award	WJSN	Won	
Asia Artist Awards	2017	Most Popular Artists (Singer) – Top 50	WJSN	Nominated	
Asia Artist Awards	2018	New Wave Award	WJSN	Won	
Asia Artist Awards	2021	Female Idol Group Popularity Award	WJSN	Nominated	
Asia Artist Awards	2021	Best Emotive Singer Award	WJSN Chocome	Won	
Asia Artist Awards	2022	Best Choice Award – Singer	WJSN Chocome	Won	
Genie Music Awards	2019	The Top Artist	WJSN	Nominated	
Genie Music Awards	2019	The Performing Artist (Female)	WJSN	Nominated	
Genie Music Awards	2019	Genie Music Popularity Award	WJSN	Nominated	
Genie Music Awards	2019	Global Popularity Award	WJSN	Nominated	
Genie Music Awards	2019	M2 Hot Star Award	WJSN	Won	
Golden Disc Awards	2017	New Artist of the Year	WJSN	Nominated	
Golden Disc Awards	2017	Popularity Award	WJSN	Nominated	
Golden Disc Awards	2017	Asian Choice Popularity Award	WJSN	Nominated	
Golden Disc Awards	2019	Disc Bonsang	For The Summer	Nominated	
Korean Entertainment Arts Awards	2017	New Artist Award	WJSN	Won	
Melon Music Awards	2016	Best New Artist	WJSN	Nominated	
Mnet Asian Music Awards	2016	Best New Artist (Female Group)	WJSN	Nominated	
Mnet Asian Music Awards	2016	HotelsCombined Artist of the Year	WJSN	Nominated	
MTV Europe Music Awards	2018	Best Korean Act	WJSN	Nominated	
Seoul Music Awards	2017	EPK Discovery Award	WJSN	Won	
Seoul Music Awards	2017	New Artist Award	WJSN	Nominated	
Seoul Music Awards	2017	Bonsang Award	WJSN	Nominated	
Seoul Music Awards	2022	U+Idol Live Best Artist Award	WJSN	Nominated	
Seoul Success Awards	2016	Rookie Award	WJSN	Won	
Soribada Best K-Music Awards	2017	Rising Hot Star Award	WJSN	Won	
Soribada Best K-Music Awards	2019	Popularity Award (Female)	WJSN	Nominated	
Soribada Best K-Music Awards	2019	New Korean Wave Artist Award	WJSN	Won	
Soribada Best K-Music Awards	2020	New Korean Wave Icon Award	WJSN	Won	
StarHub Night of Stars	2018	Most Charismatic Performance Award	WJSN	Won	
V Live Awards	2019	Artist Top 10	WJSN	Won	
