= Starship Entertainment =

South Korean record label

Starship Entertainment Co., Ltd.
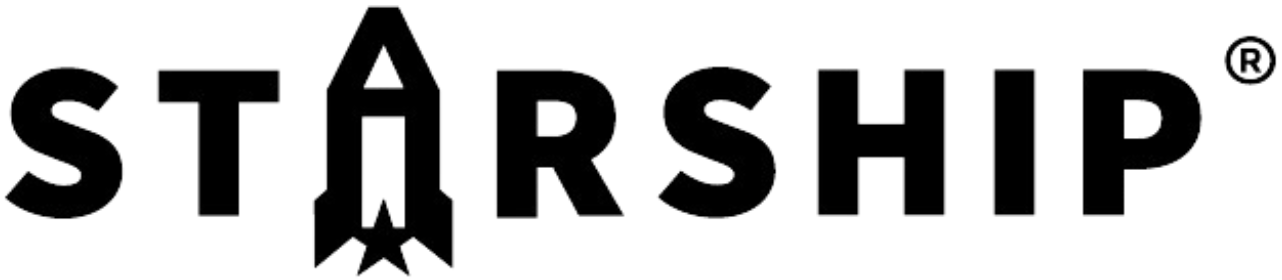
- Logo used since March 2025
- Native name: 주식회사 스타쉽엔터테인먼트
- Type: Private
- Industry: Music; entertainment
- Founded: March 4, 2008; 18 years ago
- Founder: Kim Shi-dae; Seo Hyun-joo; Kim Young-suk
- Headquarters: Gangnam-gu, Seoul, South Korea
- Key people: Kim Shi-dae (CEO and Chairman); Lee Jin-sung (CEO)
- Services: Music production, publishing, and artist management
- Revenue: ▲ ₩173.17 billion (US$129.21 million) (2025)
- Net income: ▼ ₩11.35 billion (US$8.47 million) (2025)
- Total assets: ▲ ₩198.06 billion (US$147.78 million) (2025)
- Total equity: ▲ ₩107.71 billion (US$80.37 million) (2025)
- Owner: Kakao Entertainment (66.16%); Seo Hyun-joo (18.96%); Others (14.88%)
- Subsidiaries: Starship X (2013); King Kong by Starship (2015); Highline (2017); Shownote (2019)
- Website: starship-ent.com

Starship Entertainment Co., Ltd. (Korean: 주식회사 스타쉽엔터테인먼트) is a South Korean entertainment company founded in 2008 and became an independent subsidiary of Kakao Entertainment in 2013. It is also called one of the "five major agencies" in the Korean music industry.

It has been recognized for its contributions to the Hallyu Wave, being home to several prominent K-pop groups and soloists. These include groups such as Monsta X, WJSN, Cravity, Ive, KiiiKiii, and Idid and soloists such as K.Will and Brother Su, as well as formerly home to Sistar, Boyfriend, Junggigo, Mad Clown, Jooyoung, Soyou, Yoo Seung-woo, Jeong Se-woon, and DJ Soda. It also manages actors under King Kong by Starship.

== History ==
=== 2008–2012: Founding and beginnings ===
Starship Entertainment was founded in 2008, by the couple Kim Shi-dae and Seo Hyun-joo with Kim Young-suk. Kim Shi-dae previously worked as a road manager for K-pop co-ed group Cool, as well as worked for Big Hit Entertainment between 2005 and 2007, while Seo Hyun-joo worked for JYP Entertainment.

Starship's first artist was ex-Big Hit singer K.Will, who released his first single "Love 119" for the label in 2008. In 2010, Starship debuted their first girl group Sistar, while their first boy group Boyfriend the following year.

=== 2013–present: Expansion and subsidiary labels ===
In 2013, Starship launched its first subsidiary label "Starship X", with rapper Mad Clown being its first signed artist. On December 18, 70% of the label's shares were acquired by its distributor LOEN Entertainment (renamed to Kakao M in 2018 and predecessor of Kakao Entertainment), making it an independent subsidiary of the latter. As of 2025, Kakao Entertainment is still the largest shareholder of the label, holding a 66.16% stake.

In July 2014, Starship signed singer Jeong Se-woon, following his appearance on K-pop Star 3. In December, Starship formed its second boy group Monsta X through the Mnet's survival show No.Mercy, with the seven winners of the show, debuted in 2015, and promoted as a hip hop boy group.

In April 2015, Starship signed a mutual management contract with the Chinese label Yuehua Entertainment. In December, they jointly formed a new girl group Cosmic Girls, also known as WJSN, debuted in 2016, and aimed at appealing to both South Korean and Chinese audiences. In May, Starship acquired all of King Kong Entertainment's shares in a strategic partnership alliance. In January 2017, Starship and King Kong registered their merger. The agencies mutually agreed to use the name of Starship Entertainment, while the division that manages the actors would operate under the label "King Kong by Starship".

In 2017, Starship launched another subsidiary label House of Music, which focused was on recruiting smaller, independent artists, with MoonMoon being the first artist signed under the label. In November 2018, Starship renamed the label "Highline Entertainment". In June, its first girl group Sistar disbanded, with members Dasom and Soyou remaining under Starship.

In May 2019, its first boy group Boyfriend disbanded. In December, Starship acquired the performance production company Shownote at 100% stake. It was established in 2005, which has an accumulated experience in producing live entertainment in various fields including musicals, concerts, plays, showcases, children's performances, exhibitions, and fan meetings.

In 2020, Starship began expanding Highline, with signed artists such as Wonho, Yoo Seung-woo, and DJ Soda. On April 14, Starship debuted its new boy group Cravity. In August, Starship won the Korea Creative Content Agency Award, for their contributions to the Hallyu Wave.

In June 2021, the label partnered with Eshy Gazit's new label venture Intertwine, in partnership with BMG. Monsta X and Wonho were the first two artists involved in the partnership, securing both a global distribution deal and expansion. On August 22, Starship is reported to form a new girl group, featuring then-trainees Jang Won-young and An Yu-jin, whom were formerly part of Iz*One, in the second half of 2021. The girl group Ive debuted on December 1.

In April 2022, Starship has appointed Lee Hoon-hee as the new CEO. He is an expert in the Korean entertainment industry, who has experienced music and media contents, and has served as CEO of KOEN Media Production Department, CEO of SM C&C, and the Head of Production at KBS. He will lead Starship with the current CEO Lee Jin-sung (CEO of King Kong by Starship). On August 8, Starship announced that all members of Monsta X renewed their contracts, except I.M, but he will still continue to participate in the group's future plans. On October 24, Yang Jae-woong's older brother Yang Jae-jin, a psychiatrist and broadcaster, has signed an exclusive contract with the agency.

In January 2023, Starship planned to open its Dear U bubble service for all its artists, starting in February for three years. On March 3, Starship released a statement announcing that WJSN Chinese members' Xuanyi, Cheng Xiao, and Meiqi had departed from the group following the expiration of their contracts. In the same announcement, it was also stated that Luda and Dawon chose not to renew their contracts but did not specify whether they will remain in the group. Starship announced that Seola and Eunseo did not renew their contracts with the label in September 2026.

In September 2024, Starship announced that Jeong Se-woon chose not to renew his contract after being with the label for ten years.

In February 2025, Starship announced that it will launch a new girl group KiiiKiii for the first time in four years since Ive in 2021. On February 14, it was revealed that Starship will strengthen its multi-producing system and detailed management system by organizing them through divisions; Division 1 (K.Will, Monsta X, and Ive), Division 2 (WJSN and Cravity), and Division 3 (KiiiKiii), for domestic and global promotions. On March 3, Starship announced that it will launch a new boy group for the first time in five years, following Monsta X and Cravity, aiming to debut within the year. The girl group KiiiKiii debuted on March 24. On July 16, it was reported that Starship had acquired a second headquarter building, valued at ₩59 billion (approximately US$42.7 million). The boy group Idid debuted on September 15, formed through the survival show Debut's Plan. On October 28, Starship and Pop Mart signed LOI for global IP joint venture.

== Philanthropy ==
In July 2022, Starship and its artists participated in The Blue Tree Foundation's campaign to declare support for non-violence. It was established to prevent school and cyberbullying, and to heal the victims, is conducting a "national non-violence campaign" in which the citizens can participate to publicize the seriousness of violence and to spread a culture of non-violence.

In February 2023, Starship donated ₩150 million to help in the 2023 Turkey–Syria earthquake through Hope Bridge National Disaster Relief Association.

== Partnerships ==
=== Active ===
- Universal Music Japan
- Sony Music Japan
- (Japan) Amuse Inc.
- (United States) Intertwine

=== Former ===
- (Japan) Being Group
- (Japan) Kiss Entertainment
- (China) Yuehua Entertainment

== Artists ==
All artists under Starship Entertainment are collectively known as Starship Planet.

=== Musicians ===
==== Soloists ====
- K.Will
- Kihyun
- Joohoney
- Dayoung

==== Groups ====
- Monsta X
  - Shownu X Hyungwon
- WJSN
- Cravity
- Ive
- KiiiKiii
- Idid

==== Project groups ====
- Y-Teen (with KT Corporation)
- OG School Project (with Cube Entertainment)
- YDPP (with Brand New Music)
- WJMK (with Fantagio)

==== Starship X ====
- Brother Su
- Kiggen

==== Highline ====
- Wonho
- Leon
- DJ Vanto
- dress
- ROVXE
- Seungguk

=== Entertainers ===
- Yang Jae-jin

== Former artists ==
- Sistar (2010–2017)
  - Bora (2010–2017)
  - Hyolyn (2010–2017)
  - Dasom (2010–2021)
  - Soyou (2010–2021)
- Boyfriend (2011–2019)
- Mind U (2017–2022)
- Duetto (2017–2022)
- Monsta X
  - I.M (2015–2022)
- WJSN
  - Luda (2016–2023)
  - Dawon (2016–2023)
  - Xuanyi (2016–2023)
  - Cheng Xiao (2016–2023)
  - Meiqi (2016–2023)
  - Seola (2016–2026)
  - Eunseo (2016–2026)
- Jeong Se-woon (2014–2024)

=== Starship X ===
- Junggigo (2013–2018)
- Mad Clown (2013–2018)
- Jooyoung (2014–2021)
- #Gun (2015–2022)

=== Highline ===
- MoonMoon (2017–2018; contract terminated due to occlusion of a formal criminal record)
- DJ Soda (2018–2021)
- Lil Reta (2020–2022)
- Jang Seok-hoon (2019–2022)
- PLUMA (2019–2022)
- M1NU (2020–2022)
- Yoo Seung-woo (2015–2020; (Note: Under the subsidiary label Starship Y.) 2020–2024)

== Accolades ==
=== Awards ===
Name of the award ceremony, year presented, category, recipient of the award, and the result of the nomination
Award ceremony	Year	Category	Recipient	Result	Ref.
Asia Artist Awards	2022	Best Producer Award	Seo Hyun-joo	Won	
Asia Artist Awards	2023	Best Producer Award	Seo Hyun-joo	Won	
Asia Artist Awards	2024	Best Creator Award	Seo Hyun-joo	Won	
Asia Artist Awards	2025	Legendary K-pop Master Professional	Seo Hyun-joo	Won	
Circle Chart Music Awards	2015	Producer of the Year	Kim Shi-dae	Won	
Golden Disc Awards	2023	Best Producer	Seo Hyun-joo	Won	
Korea Content Awards (Note: Hosted by the Ministry of Culture, Sports and Tourism and the Korea Creative Content Agency, it awards content industry workers who have led the global cultural trend with K-content since 2009, and selects and awards excellent content.)	2023	Minister of Culture, Sports and Tourism Commendation	Seo Hyun-joo	Won	
Korea Popular Music Awards (Note: The Korea Popular Music Awards was jointly established in 2018 by the Korea Singers Association, the Korea Entertainment Producer's Association, the Recording Industry Association of Korea, the Federation of Korean Music Performers, and the Korea Music Copyright Association.)	2018	Producer Award	Kim Shi-dae	Won	
K-World Dream Awards	2025	Best Producer Award	Seo Hyun-joo	Won	
Melon Music Awards	2024	Best Producer	Seo Hyun-joo	Won	
Newsis K-Expo Cultural Awards (Note: Co-sponsored by Korea's Ministry of Culture, Sports and Tourism, Ministry of Trade, Industry, and Energy, Korea Communications Commission, and Korea Creative Content Agency, it awards cultural icons and businesses who have contributed greatly to Hallyu, the Korean wave.)	2020	Korea Creative Content Agency Award	Kim Shi-dae	Won	
Soribada Best K-Music Awards	2019	Best Hip Hop Maker Award	dress	Won	

=== Listicles ===
Name of publisher, year listed, name of listicle, and placement
Publisher	Year	Listicle	Placement	Ref.
Billboard	2025	Women in Music – Labels & Distributors	Placed (Note: Given to Seo Hyun-joo as the executive producer of Starship Entertainment.)	
