= Boyfriend discography =

- Studio albums: 4
- Extended plays: 7
- Soundtrack albums: 4
- Compilation albums: 2
- Singles: 24
- Music videos: 30
- Collaboration: 3

South Korean boy group Boyfriend have released four studio albums (one of which was re-released), seven extended plays, two compilation albums, and twenty-four singles. Formed in 2011 by Starship Entertainment, they debuted on Mnet's M!Countdown on May 26, 2011 with their debut single "Boyfriend".

== Albums ==
=== Studio albums ===
List of studio albums, with selected details and chart positions
Title	Album details	Peak chart positions			Sales
Title	Album details	KOR	JPN	JPN Cmb.	Sales
Janus	Released: November 14, 2012 (KOR); Label: Starship Entertainment; Formats: CD, digital download	2	60	—	KOR: 30,955+; JPN: 6,523
Japanese
Seventh Mission	Released: May 29, 2013 (JPN); Label: Being; Formats: CD, digital download	—	7	—	JPN: 13,085+
Seventh Color	Released: July 23, 2014 (JPN); Label: Being; Format: CD, digital download	—	11	—	JPN: 8,017+
Bouquet	Released: February 27, 2019 (JPN); Label: KISS Entertainment; Formats: CD, digital download	—	20	22	JPN: 6,963
"—" denotes releases that did not chart or were not released in that region.

=== Compilation albums ===
List of compilation albums, with selected details, chart positions, sales, and certifications
Title	Album details	Peak chart positions		Sales
Title	Album details	KOR	JPN	Sales
We Are Boyfriend	Released: June 6, 2012 (JPN); Label: Being; Formats: CD, digital download	—	12	JPN: 10,702+
Boyfriend Love Communication 2012～2014 -Perfect Best Collection-	Released: June 10, 2015 (JPN); Label: Being; Formats: CD, digital download	—	27	JPN: 2,113+
"—" denotes releases that did not chart or were not released in that region.

=== Reissues ===
List of reissues, with selected chart positions and sales
Title	Album details	Peak chart positions		Sales
Title	Album details	KOR	JPN	Sales
I Yah	Released: January 14, 2013; Label: Starship Entertainment; Formats: CD, digital download	5	44	KOR: 24,675+

== Extended plays ==
List of extended plays, with selected chart positions and sales
Title	Details	Peak chart positions		Sales
Title	Details	KOR	JPN	Sales
Love Style	Released: June 14, 2012 (KOR); Label: Starship Entertainment; Formats: CD, digital download	2	101	KOR: 24,732+; JPN: 2,652+
Obsession	Released: June 9, 2014 (KOR); Label: Starship Entertainment; Formats: CD, digital download	4	—	KOR: 25,297+
Witch	Released: October 13, 2014 (KOR); Label: Starship Entertainment; Formats: CD, digital download	4	—	KOR: 21,598+
Boyfriend in Wonderland	Released: March 9, 2015 (KOR); Label: Starship Entertainment; Formats: CD, digital download	2	—	KOR: 19,789+
Summer	Released: July 12, 2017 (JPN); Label: KISS Entertainment; Formats: CD, digital download	—	9	JPN: 8,596
Never End	Released: August 9, 2017 (KOR); Label: Starship Entertainment; Formats: CD, digital download	5	47	KOR: 42,764+; JPN: 1,752
Adonis	Released: December 29, 2021 (KOR); Label: Cross Phase; Formats: Digital download	—	—	
Curtain Call	Released: April 19, 2023 (KOR); Label: WESTTIME; Formats: Digital download	—	—	
Boyager 6	Released: May 26, 2026; Label: WESTTIME; Formats: Digital download	—	—	
"—" denotes releases that did not chart or were not released in that region.

== Singles ==
List of singles, with selected chart positions, showing year released and album name
Title	Year	Peak chart positions				Sales (Note: Korean-language singles are based on digital downloads while Japanese-language singles are physical units, except noted.)	Album
Title	Year	KOR	KOR Hot.	JPN	JPN Hot.	Sales	Album
Korean
"Boyfriend"	2011	71	—	—	—	KOR: 20,314+ (Phy.); KOR: 213,407+	Boyfriend (single)
"Don't Touch My Girl"	2011	45	39	—	—	KOR: 26,456+ (Phy.); KOR: 454,107+	Don't Touch My Girl (single)
"I'll Be There"	2011	40	39	—	—	KOR: 28,980+ (Phy.); KOR: 365,668+	I'll Be There (single)
"Love Style"	2012	55	46	—	—	KOR: 198,586+	Love Style
"Janus"	2012	53	25	—	—	KOR: 169,589+	Janus
"I Yah"	2013	50	46	—	—	KOR: 112,404+	I Yah
"On & On"	2013	44	—	—	—	KOR: 76,282+	Witch
"Obsession"	2014	48	93	—	—	KOR: 54,751+	Obsession
"Witch"	2014	92	—	—	—	KOR: 26,311+	Witch
"Bounce"	2015	77	—	—	—	KOR: 20,451+	Boyfriend in Wonderland
"To My Bestfriend"	2016	192	—	—	—	KOR: 9,892+	Non-album single
"Star"	2017	—	—	—	—	—N/a	Never End
"Sunshower"	2018	—	—	—	—	—N/a	Non-album single
"Ending Credit"	2021	—	—	—	—	—N/a	Non-album single
"Adonis"	2021	—	—	—	—	—N/a	Adonis
"Canvas"	2022	—	—	—	—	—N/a	Non-album single
"Finale"	2023	—	—	—	—	—N/a	Curtain Call
"That Day All Day"	2023	—	—	—	—	—N/a	Non-album singles
"Our Memory"	2025	—	—	—	—	—N/a	Non-album singles
"Starlit Voices"	2026	— (Note: "Starlit Voices" did not enter the Circle Digital Chart, but peaked at number 177 on the component Download Chart.)	—	—	—	—N/a	Boyager 6
Japanese
"Be My Shine"	2012	—	—	4	4	JPN: 58,185+	Seventh Mission
"Kimi to Dance Dance Dance / My Lady (Fuyu no Koibito)"	2012	—	—	3	8	JPN: 40,170+	Seventh Mission
"Melody of Eyes"	2013	—	—	4	5	JPN: 36,654+	Seventh Mission
"Pinky Santa"	2013	—	—	5	9	JPN: 35,701+	Pinky Santa
"My Avatar"	2014	—	—	6	5	JPN: 23,654+	Seventh Color
"Startup!"	2014	—	—	9	—	JPN: 19,296+	Seventh Color
"Glider"	2016	—	—	3	3	JPN: 39,841+	Bouquet
"Jackpot"	2016	—	—	4	—	JPN: 29,757+	Bouquet
"I Miss You"	2017	—	—	7	13	JPN: 13,067+	Bouquet
"Summer"	2017	—	—	—	—		Bouquet
"Try My Wings"	2018	—	—	7	7	JPN: 19,685+	Bouquet
"Call Me"	2018	—	—	7	10	JPN: 17,297+	Bouquet
"Stay The Way You Are"	2019	—	—	—	—		Bouquet
"Time Limit"	2025	—	—	—	—		Time Limit
"—" denotes releases that did not chart or were not released in that region.

=== Collaboration singles ===
Title	Year	Peak chart positions	Album
Title	Year	KOR	Album
"Pink Romance" (with K.Will and Sistar)	2011	25	Non-album singles
"Snow Candy" (with K.Will and Sistar)	2013	13	Non-album singles
"Love Is You" (with K.Will, Sistar, Junggigo, Mad Clown and Jooyoung)	2014	10	Non-album singles
"—" denotes releases that did not chart or were not released in that region.

== Soundtrack appearances ==
Year	Title	Album
2013	"Melody Of Eyes"	Detective Conan
2013	"Magic of Love"	GOGO Ikemen 5
2013	"Beautiful Life"	GOGO Ikemen 5
2014	"Find Yourself"	The Snow Queen 2

== Videography ==
=== DVDs ===
Title	Details	Peak chart positions		Sales
Title	Details	KOR	JPN	Sales
Boyfriend Love Communication 2012 ~X Mas Bell~	Released: March 13, 2013 (JPN); Label: Being Group; Format: DVD; Track listing Limited Edition: 1. (Body + making) DVD + LIVE staff t-shirt replicas (one size that fits all); 2. B3 Double-sided Poster A (6pcs Enclosed/Folded)"Boyfriend"; Standard Edition: 1. (Body + making) DVD + LIVE staff laminated ID; [replica] (? initial production only): 1. B3 double-sided poster B [6pcs enclosed/folded]; Set list: 1. "Boyfriend" Japanese Version; 2. "Be my shine" 3. "??????"; 4. "You’re My Lady"; 5. "Don’t Touch My Girl"; 6. "MY LADY ~????~"; 7. "??????Story" (The Story You Never Knew); 8. "JANUS"; 9. "You and I"; 10. "Go Back"; 11. "??????????"; 12. "One Day"; 13. Christmas Song Cover(??????~All I want for Christmas is you); 14. "???Dance Dance Dance"; 15. "Love Style"; 16. "Super Hero"; 17. "I’ll Be There"; 18. [ENCORE]; 19. "Hitomi No Melody" (Detective Conan TV version); 20. "???Dance Dance Dance"	—	5	JPN: 5,132+
Boyfriend Love Communication 2013 -Seventh Mission-	Released: September 25, 2013 (JPN); Label: Being Group; Format: DVD; Track listing Limited Edition: 1. BOX specifications 2. DVD main title 3. Member character cotton doll LIVE ver. (random inclusion of all six / one body); 4. LIVE B3-sided poster A (6 fold inclusion); 5. Linked purchaser benefits application serial number; Standard Edition: 1. Main part DVD; 2. Making DVD (about 15 minutes); 3. BOYFRIEND personal data card (random inclusion of all six / one); 4. B3 both sides LIVE poster B (6 fold inclusion); 5. Linked purchaser benefits application serial number; Set list: 1. "Code Name; Spy Get Love"; 2. "Supernatural"; 3. "Love Style"; 4. "Hitomi No Melody"; 5. "Dangerous"; 6. "My I"; 7. "My Lady"; 8. "Listen" (Jap Ver.)(Donghyun solo); 9. "Trippin'" (Remix)(Hyunseong solo); 10. "One Day" (Rock Remix)(Jeongmin solo); 11. Minwoo's solo Dance show 12. Youngmin and Kwangmin Dance Show; 13. "Janus"; 14. "I Yah"; 15. "Standing With You"; 16. "Magic Of Love"; 17. "Beautiful Life"; 18. "First Kiss"; 19. "On & On"; 20. "Don’t Touch My Girl"; 21. "I’ll Be There"; 22. "Be My Shine"; 23. "Dance Dance Dance"; 24. [ENCORE]; 25. "Waikiki"; 26. "Party Plane"	—	18	JPN: 5,028+
GOGO Ikemen 5	Released: October 2, 2013 (JPN); Label: Being Group; Format: DVD; Track listing Limited Edition: 1. GOGO Ikemen 5; 2. Cotton doll randomly selected from six members 3. B3-sized reversible poster A; Standard Edition: 1. GOGO Ikemen 5; 2. CD featuring the main theme "Beautiful Life" sung by BOYFRIEND; 3. B3-sided reversible poster B	—	19	
I'm Your Boyfriend	Released: November 25, 2013 (KOR); Label: Starship Entertainment, Being Group; Format: DVD; Track listing Disc 1: 01. Before Debut; 1. Before Debut Pt. 1; 2. Before Debut Pt. 2; 3. Reality Program Special Mission; 02. The Debut; 1. “Boyfriend” Album Photo Shoot; 2. “Boyfriend” M/V Set; 3. “Don’t Touch My Girl” M/V Set; 4. “Don’t Touch My Girl” Album Activities; 5. “I’ll be there” Album Photo Shoot; 6. “I’ll be there” M/V Set; Disc 2: 03. Boyfriend’s Love Style; 1. “Love Style” M/V Set; 2. KM’s break time 3. Boyfriend in Okinawa; 04. Secret Garden; 1. “JANUS” Album Photo Shoot; 2. Secret Talk; 3. “I Yah” M/V Set; 4. Royal Pass Camp with Bestfriends; 05. To my Bestfriends; 1. Boyfriend in Guangzhou - “Standing With U”; 06. Boyfriend’s Music Video Collection; 1. Boyfriend; 2. Don’t Touch My Girl; 3. I’ll Be There; 4. LOVE STYLE; 5. Janus; 6. I YAH; 7. ON & ON	—	—	
Boyfriend Hello Baby DVD Box Set 1	Released: March 5, 2014 (JPN); Label: Victor Entertainment; Format: DVD; Track listing: 1. Episode 1; 2. Episode 2; 3. Episode 3; 4. Episode 4; 5. Episode 5; 6. Episode 6	—	191	
Boyfriend Hello Baby DVD Box Set 2	Released: March 26, 2014 (JPN); Label: Victor Entertainment; Format: DVD; Track listing: 1. Episode 7; 2. Episode 8; 3. Episode 9; 4. Episode 10; 5. Episode 11; 6. Episode 12	—	178	
"—" denotes releases that did not chart or were not released in that region.

=== Music videos ===
Title	Year	Note
Korean
"Let's Get It Started (Water Floor)"	2011	
"Boyfriend"	2011	Features Sistar's Bora
"Don't Touch My Girl"	2011	Features Lee Se-young
"I'll Be There"	2011	Features Spica's Jiwon
"Love Style"	2012	
"Janus"	2012	Features Cosmic Girls' Seola
"I Yah"	2013	Features Kim So-hyun
"On & On"	2013	
"Obsession"	2014	
"Alarm"	2014	
"Witch"	2014	
"White Out"	2014	
"Bounce"	2015	Features Kim Hee-jeong
"To My Bestfriend"	2016	
"Star"	2017	
"Sunshower"	2018	
"Adonis"	2021	
"Finale"	2023	
"Starlit Voices"	2026	
Japanese
"Be my Shine"	2012	Japanese Debut PV
"Dance Dance Dance"	2012	
"My Lady"	2012	
"Melody of Eyes"	2013	
"Pinky Santa"	2013	
"My Avatar"	2014	
"Startup!"	2014	
"Here!"	2014	
"Glider"	2016	
"Jackpot"	2016	
"I Miss You"	2017	
"Summer"	2017	
"Try My Wings"	2018	
"Call Me"	2018	
"Stay The Way You Are"	2019	
"Time Limit"	2025	
