= Starship Entertainment discography =

Albums

This is a list of singles and albums released under Starship Entertainment. The entertainment company is home to prominent artists such as K.Will, Monsta X, Brother Su, WJSN, Cravity, Ive, KiiiKiii, and Idid, as well as formerly artists such as Sistar, Boyfriend, Junggigo, Mad Clown, and Jooyoung.

== 2008–2009 ==
| Released | Title | Artist | Type | Format | Language |
|---|---|---|---|---|---|
| December 2, 2008 | Love 119 | K.Will | Single album | CD, digital download | Korean |
| March 31, 2009 | Dropping the Tears | K.Will | Extended play | CD, digital download | Korean |
| June 4, 2009 | "1 Drop Per Second" | K.Will | Digital single | Digital download | Korean |
| November 5, 2009 | Missing You | K.Will | Studio album | CD, digital download | Korean |

== 2010 ==
| Released | Title | Artist | Type | Format | Language |
|---|---|---|---|---|---|
| March 10 | "Present" | K.Will | Digital single | Digital download | Korean |
| June 3 | Push Push | Sistar | Single album | CD, digital download | Korean |
| August 25 | Shady Girl | Sistar | Single album | CD, digital download | Korean |
| December 3 | How Dare You | Sistar | Single album | CD, digital download | Korean |

== 2011 ==
| Released | Title | Artist | Type | Format | Language |
|---|---|---|---|---|---|
| January 21 | "Amazed" | K.Will | Digital single | Digital download | Korean |
| March 10 | My Heart Beating | K.Will | Extended play | CD, digital download | Korean |
| May 3 | Ma Boy | Sistar19 | Single album | CD, digital download | Korean |
| May 26 | Boyfriend | Boyfriend | Single album | CD, digital download | Korean |
| August 9 | So Cool | Sistar | Studio album | CD, digital download | Korean |
| October 6 | Don't Touch My Girl | Boyfriend | Single album | CD, digital download | Korean |
| November 25 | Starship Planet 2011 | Starship Planet | Single album | Digital download | Korean |
| December 8 | I'll Be There | Boyfriend | Single album | CD, digital download | Korean |

== 2012 ==
| Released | Title | Artist | Type | Format | Language |
|---|---|---|---|---|---|
| January 31 | "I Hate Myself" | K.Will | Digital single | Digital download | Korean |
| February 14 | I Need You | K.Will | Extended play | CD, digital download | Korean |
| April 12 | Alone | Sistar | Extended play | CD, digital download | Korean |
| June 6 | We Are Boyfriend | Boyfriend | Compilation album | CD, digital download | Japanese |
| June 11 | "As Now (We Never Go Alone)" | K.Will | Digital single | Digital download | Korean |
| June 13 | Love Style | Boyfriend | Extended play | CD, digital download | Korean |
| June 28 | Loving U | Sistar | Extended play | CD, digital download | Korean |
| August 22 | Be My Shine | Boyfriend | Single album | CD, digital download | Japanese |
| October 11 | The Third Album Pt. 1 | K.Will | Studio album | CD, digital download | Korean |
| November 8 | Janus | Boyfriend | Studio album | CD, digital download | Korean |
| November 28 | Dance Dance Dance/My Lady | Boyfriend | Single album | CD, digital download | Japanese |
| November 29 | Starship Planet 2012 | Starship Planet | Single album | Digital download | Korean |

== 2013 ==
| Released | Title | Artist | Type | Format | Language |
|---|---|---|---|---|---|
| January 10 | I Yah | Boyfriend | Studio album | CD, digital download | Korean |
| January 30 | Gone Not Around Any Longer | Sistar19 | Single album | CD, digital download | Korean |
| March 27 | Melody of Eyes | Boyfriend | Single album | CD, digital download | Japanese |
| April 4 | The Third Album Pt. 2: Love Blossom | K.Will | Studio album | CD, digital download | Korean |
| May 28 | "On & On" | Boyfriend | Digital single | Digital download | Korean |
| May 29 | Seventh Mission | Boyfriend | Studio album | CD, digital download | Japanese |
| June 11 | Give It to Me | Sistar | Studio album | CD, digital download | Korean |
| September 10 | "Stupid in Love" | Soyou and Mad Clown | Digital single | Digital download | Korean |
| October 19 | Will in Fall | K.Will | Extended play | CD, digital download | Korean |
| November 20 | Pinky Santa | Boyfriend | Single album | CD, digital download | Japanese |
| November 28 | Love & Hate | Hyolyn | Studio album | CD, digital download | Korean |
| December 13 | Starship Planet 2013 | Starship Planet | Single album | Digital download | Korean |

== 2014 ==
| Released | Title | Artist | Type | Format | Language |
|---|---|---|---|---|---|
| February 7 | "Some" | Soyou and Junggigo | Digital single | Digital download | Korean |
| April 4 | Fierce | Mad Clown | Extended play | CD, digital download | Korean |
| May 9 | "Want U" | Junggigo | Digital single | Digital download | Korean |
| June 9 | Obession | Boyfriend | Extended play | CD, digital download | Korean |
| June 25 | One Fine Day | K.Will | Extended play | CD, digital download | Korean |
| July 21 | Touch & Move | Sistar | Extended play | CD, digital download | Korean |
| July 23 | Seventh Color | Boyfriend | Studio album | CD, digital download | Japanese |
| August 26 | Sweet & Sour | Sistar | Extended play | CD, digital download | Korean |
| September 26 | "The Space Between" | Soyou and Urban Zakapa | Digital single | Digital download | Korean |
| October 13 | Witch | Boyfriend | Extended play | CD, digital download | Korean |
| November 24 | "Erase" | Hyolyn and Jooyoung | Digital single | Digital download | Korean |
| December 4 | Starship Planet 2014 | Starship Planet | Single album | Digital download | Korean |

== 2015 ==
| Released | Title | Artist | Type | Format | Language |
|---|---|---|---|---|---|
| January 2 | "Coach Me" | San E and Hyolyn | Digital single | Digital download | Korean |
| January 9 | Piece of Mine | Mad Clown | Extended play | CD, digital download | Korean |
| January 14 | "Pillow" | Soyou and Giriboy | Digital single | Digital download | Korean |
| February 5 | "0 (Young)" | Mad Clown, Giriboy, and Jooyoung | Digital single | Digital download | Korean |
| February 12 | "Interstellar" | Jooheon, Hyungwon, and I.M | Digital single | Digital download | Korean |
| February 27 | "Hieut" | Genius Nochang, Junggigo, and Vasco | Digital single | Digital download | Korean |
| March 9 | Boyfriend in Wonderland | Boyfriend | Extended play | CD, digital download | Korean |
| March 25 | [RE:] | K.Will | Extended play | CD, digital download | Korean |
| April 28 | "Feedback" | Kisum, Lil Cham, Jace, Bora, and I.M | Digital single | Digital download | Korean |
| May 14 | Trespass | Monsta X | Extended play | CD, digital download | Korean |
| June 15 | Love Communication 2012-2014 Perfect Best Collection | Boyfriend | Compilation album | CD, digital download | Japanese |
| June 22 | Shake It | Sistar | Extended play | CD, digital download | Korean |
| July 10 | "Get Low" | Mad Clown and Jooheon | Digital single | Digital download | Korean |
| July 28 | "You're Beautiful" | Yoo Seung-woo | Digital single | Digital download | Korean |
| August 26 | "Dark Panda" | Hyolyn, Zico, and Paloalto | Digital single | Digital download | Korean |
| August 27 | "3" | Jooyoung | Digital single | Digital download | Korean |
| September 1 | "Sweep" | Exy | Digital single | Digital download | Korean |
| September 7 | "The Wall Destroyer" | Hyolyn and Keebee | Digital single | Digital download | Korean |
| September 7 | Rush | Monsta X | Extended play | CD, digital download | Korean |
| September 22 | "Lean On Me" | Soyou and Kwon Jung-yeol | Digital single | Digital download | Korean |
| October 27 | "247" | Junggigo | Digital single | Digital download | Korean |
| November 11 | "Flower Cafe" | Jooheon | Digital single | Digital download | Korean |
| November 19 | "Sour Grapes" | San E and Mad Clown | Digital single | Digital download | Korean |
| December 2 | Starship Planet 2015 | Starship Planet | Single album | Digital download | Korean |
| December 18 | "Love Line" | Hyolyn, Jooyoung, and Bumkey | Digital single | Digital download | Korean |
| December 27 | Rappin | Jooheon | Mixtape | Streamed audio | Korean |

== 2016 ==
| Released | Title | Artist | Type | Format | Language |
|---|---|---|---|---|---|
| January 6 | "You Call It Romance" | K.Will | Digital single | Digital download | Korean |
| February 1 | Pit a Pat | Yoo Seung-woo | Extended play | CD, digital download | Korean |
| February 15 | "Cook for Love" | K.Will, Junggigo, Jooyoung, and Brother Su | Digital single | Digital download | Korean |
| February 18 | "Like Romance Comics" | Mad Clown and Brother Su | Digital single | Digital download | Korean |
| February 25 | Would You Like? | WJSN | Extended play | CD, digital download | Korean |
| March 9 | Alright | Dila | Mixtape | Streamed audio | Korean |
| March 14 | Reload | #Gun | Mixtape | Streamed audio | Korean |
| May 6 | Who Am I | I.M | Mixtape | Streamed audio | Korean |
| May 18 | The Clan Pt. 1 Lost | Monsta X | Extended play | CD, digital download | Korean |
| May 26 | "To My Best Friend" | Boyfriend | Digital single | Digital download | Korean |
| June 1 | Glider | Boyfriend | Single album | CD, DVD, digital download | Japanese |
| June 8 | "H.ear Your Colors" | Mad Clown | Digital single | Digital download | Korean |
| June 21 | Insane Love | Sistar | Extended play | CD, digital download | Korean |
| July 29 | "Beep" | #Gun | Digital single | Digital download | Korean |
| August 6 | "Do Better" | Y-Teen | Digital single | Digital download | Korean |
| August 17 | The Secret | WJSN | Extended play | CD, digital download | Korean |
| September 23 | "Vintage Box Vol. 1" | K.Will and Mad Clown | Digital single | Digital download | Korean |
| September 27 | "Only U" | Yoo Seung-woo | Digital single | Digital download | Korean |
| September 29 | "Nocturne" | Junggigo | Digital single | Digital download | Korean |
| October 4 | The Clan Pt. 2 Guilty | Monsta X | Extended play | CD, digital download | Korean |
| October 20 | "Madeleine" | I.M and Brother Su | Digital single | Digital download | Korean |
| November 2 | "Jackpot" | Boyfriend | Digital single | CD, DVD + CD, Digital download | Japanese |
| November 8 | It's Me | Hyolyn | Extended play | CD, digital download | Korean |
| November 11 | "Vintage Box Vol. 2" | Yoo Seung-woo and Yoo Yeon-jung | Digital single | Digital download | Korean |
| November 18 | "Hey Bae" | Junggigo | Digital single | Digital download | Korean |
| December 2 | Starship Planet 2016 | Starship Planet | Single album | Digital download | Korean |
| December 16 | "Vintage Box Vol. 3" | Junggigo and Giriboy | Digital single | Digital download | Korean |

== 2017 ==
| Released | Title | Artist | Type | Format | Language |
|---|---|---|---|---|---|
| January 4 | From. WJSN | WJSN | Extended play | CD, digital download | Korean |
| January 17 | "Vintage Box Vol. 4" | Dasom and 40 | Digital single | Digital download | Korean |
| January 18 | Rhythm | Jooheon | Mixtape | Streamed audio | Korean |
| February 3 | "Lost Without You" | Mad Clown | Digital single | Digital download | Korean |
| February 14 | "Rain" | Soyou and Baekhyun | Digital single | Digital download | Korean |
| February 22 | "I Miss You" | Boyfriend | Digital single | Digital download | Japanese |
| February 23 | "Let Me Love You" | Junggigo and Chanyeol | Digital single | Digital download | Korean |
| March 17 | Love Is a Dog From Hell | Mad Clown | Extended play | CD, digital download | Korean |
| March 21 | The Clan Pt. 2.5: The Final Chapter | Monsta X | Studio album | CD, digital download | Korean |
| April 14 | "Blue Moon" | Hyolyn and Changmo | Digital single | Digital download | Korean |
| April 20 | Across the Universe | Junggigo | Studio album | CD, digital download | Korean |
| April 27 | "Loved You" | Mind U and Mad Clown | Digital single | Digital download | Korean |
| May 4 | "Love Therapy" | Exy and Euna Kim | Digital single | Digital download | Korean |
| May 17 | Yearnings | Duetto | Extended play | CD, digital download | Korean |
| May 17 | Hero | Monsta X | Single album | CD, digital download | Japanese |
| May 31 | "Lonely" | Sistar | Digital single | Digital download | Korean |
| June 7 | Happy Moment | WJSN | Studio album | CD, digital download | Korean |
| June 19 | Shine Forever | Monsta X | Repackaged album | CD, digital download | Korean |
| June 29 | "Fruity" | Hyolyn and Kisum | Digital single | Digital download | Korean |
| July 7 | "Oppa" | Yoo Seung-woo and Sandeul | Digital single | Digital download | Korean |
| July 12 | Summer | Boyfriend | Extended play | CD, DVD, digital download | Japanese |
| July 13 | Re:Mind | Mind U | Extended play | CD, digital download | Korean |
| July 14 | "Kiss Me" | WJSN | Digital single | Digital download | Korean |
| July 22 | Be My Friend | Jooheon and I.M | Mixtape | Streamed audio | Korean |
| July 27 | "Newton" | Monsta X | Digital single | Digital download | Korean |
| August 9 | Never End | Boyfriend | Extended play | CD, digital download | Korean |
| August 17 | "Sunflower Dance" | #Gun | Digital single | Digital download | Korean |
| August 23 | Beautiful | Monsta X | Single album | CD, digital download | Japanese |
| August 24 | "Can't Stop This Feeling" | Yoo Seung-woo and Younha | Digital single | Digital download | Korean |
| August 31 | Part 1 Ever | Jeong Se-woon | Extended play | CD, digital download | Korean |
| September 7 | "The Blue Night of Jeju Island" | Soyou | Digital single | Digital download | Korean |
| September 26 | The 4th Album Part 1 | K.Will | Studio album | CD, digital download | Korean |
| October 13 | "Tonight" | Yoo Seung-woo | Digital single | Digital download | Korean |
| November 3 | Dear | Mind U | Extended play | CD, digital download | Korean |
| November 7 | The Code | Monsta X | Extended play | CD, digital download | Korean |
| November 16 | "I Still" | Soyou and Sung Si-kyung | Digital single | Digital download | Korean |
| November 23 | Romance | Yoo Seung-woo | Extended play | CD, digital download | Korean |
| December 8 | Starship Planet 2017 | Starship Planet | Single album | Digital download | Korean |
| December 13 | Re:Born | Soyou | Studio album | CD, digital download | Korean |

== 2018 ==
| Released | Title | Artist | Type | Format | Language |
|---|---|---|---|---|---|
| January 5 | "OGZ" | Jo Woo-chan, Park Hyun-jin, and Achillo | Digital single | Digital download | Korean |
| January 12 | "Timeline" | Junggigo and Boi B | Digital single | Digital download | Korean |
| January 24 | Part 2 After | Jeong Se-woon | Extended play | CD, digital download | Korean |
| January 31 | Spotlight | Monsta X | Single album | CD, digital download | Japanese |
| February 20 | Fly With Me | I.M | Mixtape | Streamed audio | Korean |
| February 21 | "Dream" | Duetto | Digital single | Digital download | Korean |
| February 27 | Dream Your Dream | WJSN | Extended play | CD, digital download | Korean |
| March 2 | Fountain | Jooyoung | Extended play | CD, digital download | Korean |
| March 25 | The Connect: Dejavu | Monsta X | Extended play | CD, digital download | Korean |
| April 25 | Piece | Monsta X | Studio album | CD, digital download | Japanese |
| May 25 | "Sunshower" | Boyfriend | Digital single | Digital download | Korean |
| July 23 | Another | Jeong Se-woon | Extended play | CD, digital download | Korean |
| August 31 | DWTD | Jooheon | Mixtape | Streamed audio | Korean |
| September 19 | WJ Please? | WJSN | Extended play | CD, digital download | Korean |
| October 4 | Re:Fresh | Soyou | Extended play | CD, digital download | Korean |
| October 22 | Take.1 Are You There? | Monsta X | Studio album | CD, digital download | Korean |
| November 6 | The 4th Album Part 2 | K.Will | Studio album | CD, digital download | Korean |

== 2019 ==
| Released | Title | Artist | Type | Format | Language |
|---|---|---|---|---|---|
| January 8 | WJ Stay? | WJSN | Extended play | CD, digital download | Korean |
| February 18 | Take.2 We Are Here | Monsta X | Studio album | CD, digital download | Korean |
| March 19 | Plus Minus Zero | Jeong Se-woon | Extended play | CD, digital download | Korean |
| March 27 | Shoot Out | Monsta X | Single album | CD, digital download | Japanese |
| April 19 | Horizon | I.M | Mixtape | Streamed audio | English |
| May 3 | Yoo Seung-woo 2 | Yoo Seung-woo | Studio album | CD, digital download | Korean |
| June 4 | For the Summer | WJSN | Extended Play | CD, digital download | Korean |
| June 30 | Pure Happiness | Jooyoung | Extended Play | Digital download | Korean |
| August 21 | Phenomenon | Monsta X | Studio album | CD, digital download | Japanese |
| October 2 | Day | Jeong Se-woon | Extended play | CD, digital download | Korean |
| October 28 | Follow: Find You | Monsta X | Extended play | CD, digital download | Korean |
| November 19 | As You Wish | WJSN | Extended play | CD, digital download | Korean |

== 2020 ==
| Released | Title | Artist | Type | Format | Language |
|---|---|---|---|---|---|
| February 14 | All About Luv | Monsta X | Studio Album | CD, LP, digital download | English |
| April 14 | Season 1. Hideout: Remember Who We Are | Cravity | Extended play | CD, digital download | Korean |
| April 15 | Wish on the Same Sky | Monsta X | Single album | CD, digital download | Japanese |
| May 26 | Fantasia X | Monsta X | Extended play | CD, digital download | Korean |
| June 9 | Neverland | WJSN | Extended play | CD, digital download | Korean |
| June 28 | Gotta Go | Soyou | Single album | CD, digital download | Korean |
| July 14 | 24 Part. 1 | Jeong Se-woon | Studio album | CD, digital download | Korean |
| August 24 | Season 2. Hideout: The New Day We Step Into | Cravity | Extended play | CD, digital download | Korean |
| October 7 | Hmph! | WJSN Chocome | Single album | CD, digital download | Korean |
| October 9 | Psyche | Joohoney | Mixtape | Streamed audio | Korean |
| November 2 | Fatal Love | Monsta X | Studio album | CD, digital download | Korean |
| December 16 | Love Killa | Monsta X | Single album | CD, digital download | Japanese |

== 2021 ==
| Released | Title | Artist | Type | Format | Language |
|---|---|---|---|---|---|
| January 6 | 24 Part. 2 | Jeong Se-woon | Studio album | CD, digital download | Korean |
| January 19 | Season 3. Hideout: Be Our Voice | Cravity | Extended play | CD, digital download | Korean |
| February 19 | Duality | I.M | Extended play | Digital download | Korean |
| March 10 | Wanted | Monsta X | Single album | CD, digital download | Japanese |
| March 11 | Good Night My Love | Soyou | Single album | CD, digital download | Korean |
| March 31 | Unnatural | WJSN | Extended play | CD, digital download | Korean |
| May 5 | Flavors of Love | Monsta X | Studio album | CD, digital download | Japanese |
| May 12 | My Attitude | WJSN The Black | Single album | CD, digital download | Korean |
| June 1 | One of a Kind | Monsta X | Extended play | CD, digital download | Korean |
| July 26 | "Kiss or Death" | Monsta X | Digital single | Digital download | Korean |
| August 19 | The Awakening: Written in the Stars | Cravity | Studio album | CD, digital download | Korean |
| September 10 | "One Day" | Monsta X | Digital single | Digital download | English |
| September 23 | "Let Me In" | WJSN | Digital single | Digital download | Korean |
| November 19 | No Limit | Monsta X | Extended play | CD, digital download | Korean |
| December 1 | Eleven | Ive | Single album | CD, digital download | Korean |
| December 10 | The Dreaming | Monsta X | Studio album | CD, digital download | English |

== 2022 ==
| Released | Title | Artist | Type | Format | Language |
|---|---|---|---|---|---|
| January 5 | Super Yuppers! | WJSN Chocome | Single album | CD, digital download | Korean |
| March 15 | Voyager | Kihyun | Single album | CD, digital download | Korean |
| March 22 | Liberty: In Our Cosmos | Cravity | Studio album | CD, digital download | Korean |
| April 5 | Love Dive | Ive | Single album | CD, digital download | Korean |
| April 26 | Shape of Love | Monsta X | Extended play | CD, digital download | Korean |
| May 11 | Where Is My Garden! | Jeong Se-woon | Extended play | CD, digital download | Korean |
| May 31 | "Vivid" | Cravity | Digital single | Digital download | Korean |
| July 5 | Sequence | WJSN | Single album | CD, digital download | Korean |
| July 7 | "If with U" | Monsta X | Digital single | Digital download | Korean |
| August 22 | After Like | Ive | Single album | CD, digital download | Korean |
| September 27 | New Wave | Cravity | Extended play | CD, digital download | Korean |
| October 24 | Youth | Kihyun | Extended play | CD, digital download | Korean |

== 2023 ==
| Released | Title | Artist | Type | Format | Language |
|---|---|---|---|---|---|
| January 9 | Reason | Monsta X | Extended play | CD, digital download | Korean |
| March 6 | Master: Piece | Cravity | Extended play | CD, digital download | Korean |
| April 10 | I've Ive | Ive | Studio album | CD, digital download | Korean |
| April 20 | Duality | I.M | Extended play | LP | Korean |
| May 22 | Lights | Joohoney | Extended play | CD, digital download | Korean |
| May 31 | Wave | Ive | Extended play | CD, digital download | Japanese |
| July 25 | The Unseen | Shownu X Hyungwon | Extended play | CD, digital download | Korean |
| September 11 | Sun Seeker | Cravity | Extended play | CD, digital download | Korean |
| October 13 | I've Mine | Ive | Extended play | CD, digital download | Korean |

== 2024 ==
| Released | Title | Artist | Type | Format | Language |
|---|---|---|---|---|---|
| January 4 | Quiz | Jeong Se-woon | Extended play | CD, digital download | Korean |
| January 23 | Inside Out | Seola | Single album | CD, digital download | Korean |
| February 26 | Evershine | Cravity | Extended play | CD, digital download | Korean |
| April 29 | Ive Switch | Ive | Extended play | CD, digital download | Korean |
| June 20 | All the Way | K.Will | Extended play | CD, digital download | Korean |
| August 28 | Alive | Ive | Extended play | CD, digital download | Japanese |
| December 5 | Find the Orbit | Cravity | Single album | CD, digital download | Korean |

== 2025 ==
| Released | Title | Artist | Type | Format | Language |
|---|---|---|---|---|---|
| February 3 | Ive Empathy | Ive | Extended play | CD, digital download | Korean |
| March 24 | Uncut Gem | KiiiKiii | Extended play | CD, digital download | Korean |
| May 14 | Now Project Vol.1 | Monsta X | Compilation album | Digital download | Korean |
| June 23 | Dare to Crave | Cravity | Studio album | CD, digital download | Korean |
| July 30 | Be Alright | Ive | Extended play | CD, digital download | Japanese |
| August 6 | "Dancing Alone" | KiiiKiii | Digital single | Digital download | Korean |
| August 25 | Ive Secret | Ive | Extended play | CD, digital download | Korean |
| September 2 | The X | Monsta X | Extended play | CD, digital download | Korean |
| September 9 | Gonna Love Me, Right? | Dayoung | Single album | Digital download | Korean |
| September 15 | I Did It | Idid | Extended play | CD, digital download | Korean |
| November 20 | "Push Back" | Idid | Digital single | Digital download | Korean |

== 2026 ==
| Released | Title | Artist | Type | Format | Language |
|---|---|---|---|---|---|
| January 5 | 光 (Insanity) | Joohoney | Extended play | CD, digital download | Korean |
| January 26 | Delulu Pack | KiiiKiii | Extended play | CD, digital download | Korean |
| February 23 | Revive+ | Ive | Studio album | CD, digital download | Korean |
| April 3 | Unfold | Monsta X | Studio album | CD, LP, digital download | English |
| April 7 | "What's a Girl to Do" | Dayoung | Digital single | Digital download | Korean |
| April 29 | Redefine | Cravity | Extended play | CD, digital download | Korean |
| May 21 | Love Me | Shownu X Hyungwon | Extended play | CD, digital download | Korean |
| May 27 | Fly! | Idid | Single album | CD, digital download | Korean |
| July 7 | Borderline | Kihyun | Extended play | CD, digital download | Korean |
| August 10 | WhyKiiiKiii | KiiiKiii | Extended play | CD, digital download | Korean |
| September 4 | The Phase | Monsta X | Extended play | CD, digital download | Korean |
| September 26 | Now Project Vol.2 | Monsta X | Compilation album | Digital download | Korean |
| September 30 | Sonorous | Cravity | Extended play | CD, digital download | Korean |
| October 26 | Looks Can Kill | Ive | Extended play | CD, digital download | Korean |
