= List of songs written by Lee Joo-heon =

Lee Joo-heon is a South Korean rapper, songwriter, and producer, also known by the stage name Joohoney. He is a member of the South Korean boy group Monsta X, as well as a credited writer on the majority of their discography. He is also a credited writer and producer for his solo works. Joohoney had also written and produced works for other artists and groups, including labelmate Cravity, and group members Minhyuk and Hyungwon solo works.

Prior to his debut, Joohoney began writing songs, mostly with other artists on his label Starship Entertainment. He wrote for the boy group Boyfriend and the girl group C-REAL prior to his debut. He again worked with Boyfriend several years later in 2017, for their sixth EP Never End, writing their lead single, the tropical pop song "Star", alongside Jeongmin of Boyfriend. He also produced their song "Falling". Both prior to his debut and after joining Monsta X, he collaborated with the rapper Mad Clown, writing lyrics for Mad Clown's work and for the collaborative songs they released. His early style was recognized for its witty lyrics and tight rap, which showed an aggressive style.

Since Monsta X's debut in 2015, Joohoney had been involved in songwriting for the group's discography, primarily in writing his raps for all of their albums, as well as more extensive writing and producing for several of their tracks, garnering praise for his unique musicality. Onto Monsta X's 2020 EP Fantasia X, beyond writing his raps for the album, the two tracks which he wrote and produced, "Flow" and "Stand Up", were noted for how they stood as two opposing songs on the EP, a self-reflective track and a bright cheery song with an optimistic message. They were both noted for showing the softer side of Joohoney's usually aggressive music style, reflecting his versatility as an artist.

In 2020, Joohoney wrote and produced "Jumper" for Cravity's debut EP Season 1. Hideout: Remember Who We Are, which brought wider coverage and attention to the new group's debut. They also had the highest album sales of newly debuted artists for the first half of 2020. For their EP One of a Kind, released in 2021, Joohoney was a credited producer on Monsta X's title track for the first time, previously only had written lyrics for their title tracks.

As of September 2026, he has a total of 180 song credits for writing and producing through the Korea Music Copyright Association (KOMCA).

== Songs ==
All credits are adapted from the KOMCA, unless stated otherwise.

=== 2011–2014 ===
Year	Artist(s)	Song	Album	Lyrics		Music		Arrangement	
Year	Artist(s)	Song	Album	Credited	With	Credited	With	Credited	With
2011	C-REAL	"What What"	Round 1	Yes	Wheesung	No	N/A	No	N/A
2012	Boyfriend	"I YAH"	Janus	Yes	Song Soo-yoon, Kim Seung-soo, Han Jae-ho	No	N/A	No	N/A
2013	Boyfriend, K.Will, Sistar	"Snow Candy"	Starship Planet 2013	Yes	Min Yeon-jae	No	N/A	No	N/A
2014	Mad Clown	"Ganggab" (깽값)	Ferocity (표독)	Yes	Mad Clown	No	N/A	No	N/A

=== 2015 ===
Artist(s)	Song	Album	Lyrics		Music		Arrangement	
Artist(s)	Song	Album	Credited	With	Credited	With	Credited	With
Hyolyn, San E feat. Jooheon	"Coach Me"	No.Mercy OST	Yes	San E, Fame J, Honey Butter Jam, Kim Ina	No	N/A	No	N/A
Mad Clown, Giriboy, Jooyoung feat. No.Mercy contestants	"0 (Young)"	No.Mercy OST	Yes	I.M, Mad Clown, Jooyoung, Hong Si-young, George	No	N/A	No	N/A
Monsta X	"No Exit"	Trespass	Yes	Rhymer, I.M, Kihyun	Yes	Rhymer, Lissie, Kihyun	No	N/A
Monsta X	"One Love"	Trespass	Yes	Nago, I.M	Yes	Nago, Lee Ji-hoon	No	N/A
Monsta X	"Steal Your Heart"	Trespass	Yes	Rhymer, Wonho, I.M	No	N/A	No	N/A
Monsta X	"Blue Moon"	Trespass	Yes	I.M	Yes	Nago	No	N/A
Monsta X	"Interstellar"	Trespass	Yes	I.M, Yella Diamond	No	N/A	No	N/A
Junggigo, Jooheon	"Similar"	Mask OST	Yes	Park Jang-geun	No	N/A	No	N/A
Jooheon feat. Flowsik	"STAY STRONG"	SUPEXX	Yes	Flowsik	No	N/A	No	N/A
Jooheon feat. Mad Clown	"Get Low"	SUPEXX	Yes	Mad Clown	No	N/A	No	N/A
J'Kyun feat. Jooheon, Konsoul	"Bad X"	Non-album single	Yes	J'Kyun, Konsoul	No	N/A	No	N/A
Monsta X	"Rush"	Rush	Yes	Giriboy, I.M	No	N/A	No	N/A
Monsta X	"Hero"	Rush	Yes	Punch Sound, Rhymer, I.M	No	N/A	No	N/A
Monsta X	"Perfect Girl"	Rush	Yes	Esbee, Lissie, 9999, I.M	No	N/A	No	N/A
Monsta X	"Gone Bad" (삐뚤어질래)	Rush	Yes	Mad Clown, Taewan	Yes	Taewan, Ye-Yo!	No	N/A
Monsta X	"Broken Heart"	Rush	Yes	Rescue the Beat, Kim Seung-joon, I.M	No	N/A	No	N/A
Jooheon feat. I.M, Sam Ock	"Flower Cafe"	Flower Cafe	Yes	I.M, Sam Ock, A June & J Beat	No	N/A	No	N/A

=== 2016 ===
Artist(s)	Song	Album	Lyrics		Music		Arrangement	
Artist(s)	Song	Album	Credited	With	Credited	With	Credited	With
Monsta X feat. Wheein of Mamamoo	"Ex Girl"	The Clan Pt. 1 Lost	Yes	ESBEE, I.M	No	N/A	No	N/A
Monsta X	"걸어" (All In)	The Clan Pt. 1 Lost	Yes	ESBEE, Lish, I.M, Stereo14, Mad Clown	No	N/A	No	N/A
Monsta X	"네게만 집착해" (Stuck)	The Clan Pt. 1 Lost	Yes	Punch Sound, Seo Ji-eum, I.M	No	N/A	No	N/A
Monsta X	"백설탕" (Sweetheart)	The Clan Pt. 1 Lost	Yes	I.M, Jeongmin	Yes	I.M, Jeongmin	No	N/A
Monsta X	"반칙이야" (Unfair Love)	The Clan Pt. 1 Lost	Yes	Kiggen, I.M, Stereo14, Lish, Seo Ji-eum	No	N/A	No	N/A
Monsta X	"Because of U"	The Clan Pt. 1 Lost	Yes	Rescue the Beat, I.M	No	N/A	No	N/A
Mad Clown	"Bad Blood"	Show Me the Money 5	Yes	Mad Clown	Yes	Ye-Yo!	No	N/A
Monsta X	"Fighter"	The Clan Pt. 2 Guilty	Yes	Jam Factory, I.M	No	N/A	No	N/A
Monsta X	"Be Quiet"	The Clan Pt. 2 Guilty	Yes	Mafly, I.M, Keyfly	No	N/A	No	N/A
Monsta X	"Blind"	The Clan Pt. 2 Guilty	Yes	Giriboy, I.M	No	N/A	No	N/A
Monsta X	"Queen"	The Clan Pt. 2 Guilty	Yes	Mafly, I.M, Keyfly	No	N/A	No	N/A
Monsta X	"하얀소녀" (White Love)	The Clan Pt. 2 Guilty	Yes	I.M	Yes	Ye-Yo!	No	N/A
Monsta X	"Rollercoaster"	The Clan Pt. 2 Guilty	Yes	Trinity, I.M	No	N/A	No	N/A
Jooheon, Kim Boa, DinDin	"Shall We Dance"	Tribe of Hip Hop OST	Yes	Kim Boa, DinDin	Yes	Lee Jin-ho, Ok Jae-won	No	N/A
Jooheon, Michelle Lee	"이미쉘"	Tribe of Hip Hop OST	Yes	Michelle Lee	Yes	Lee Jin-ho, Ok Jae-won, Na Kwan-hoon	No	N/A
SeSeSe House, Hot Chicks House, Brand New House, HI-Lite House	"Game of Thrones - 12 Producers"	Tribe of Hip Hop OST	Yes	P-type, Minos, Hanhae, Paloalto, Reddy, G2, Cheetah, LE, Yezi, MC Sniper, DinDin	No	N/A	No	N/A

=== 2017 ===
Artist(s)	Song	Album	Lyrics		Music		Arrangement	
Artist(s)	Song	Album	Credited	With	Credited	With	Credited	With
Jooheon	"Rhythm"	Non-album single	Yes		No	N/A	No	N/A
Monsta X	"Ready or Not"	The Clan Pt. 2.5: The Final Chapter	Yes	Lish, ESBEE, Stereo14, I.M	No	N/A	No	N/A
Monsta X	"아름다워" (Beautiful)	The Clan Pt. 2.5: The Final Chapter	Yes	Galactika, I.M	No	N/A	No	N/A
Monsta X	"넘사벽" (Great Wall)	The Clan Pt. 2.5: The Final Chapter	Yes	5$, zomay, I.M, Lee Ji-won, Lee Kyung-min, XEPY	No	N/A	No	N/A
Monsta X	"니가 필요해" (Need U)	The Clan Pt. 2.5: The Final Chapter	Yes	Lish, ESBEE, Megatone, I.M	No	N/A	No	N/A
Monsta X	"Oi"	The Clan Pt. 2.5: The Final Chapter	Yes	I.M, Wonho, Brother Su	No	N/A	No	N/A
Monsta X	"Miss You"	The Clan Pt. 2.5: The Final Chapter	Yes	Ye-Yo!, I.M	Yes	Ye-Yo!	Yes	Ye-Yo!
Monsta X	"Calm Down"	The Clan Pt. 2.5: The Final Chapter	Yes	Mafly, Keyfly, I.M	No	N/A	No	N/A
Monsta X	"너만 생각해" (All I Do)	The Clan Pt. 2.5: The Final Chapter	Yes	9999, Lish, ESBEE, I.M	No	N/A	No	N/A
Monsta X	"5:14 (Last Page)"	The Clan Pt. 2.5: The Final Chapter	Yes	Wonho, I.M	No	N/A	No	N/A
Monsta X	"넌 어때" (I'll Be There)	The Clan Pt. 2.5: The Final Chapter	Yes	Wonho, I.M	No	N/A	No	N/A
Jooheon, I.M	"Future"	Unreleased, Performance exclusives	Yes	I.M	Yes	Ye-Yo!	No	N/A
Jooheon, I.M	"MASAKA"	Unreleased, Performance exclusives	Yes	I.M	No	N/A	No	N/A
Monsta X	"Shine Forever"	Shine Forever	Yes	Lish, Stereo14, I.M, BiNTAGE	No	N/A	No	N/A
Monsta X	"Gravity"	Shine Forever	Yes	Mafly, I.M	No	N/A	No	N/A
Monsta X	"Newton"	Non-album single	Yes	I.M, XEPY	No	N/A	No	N/A
Boyfriend	"Star"	Never End	Yes	Jung Min-byeon, Hyun-min	Yes	Jung Min-byeon, Hyun-min	No	N/A
Boyfriend	"Falling"	Never End	No	N/A	Yes	Shim Jae-yong, Stereo14, The Name	No	N/A
DJ H.ONE, Justin Oh	"BAM!BAM!BAM!"	Non-album single	Yes		No	N/A	No	N/A
Monsta X	"Dramarama"	The Code	Yes	Seo Ji-eum, Seo Jung-a, I.M	No	N/A	No	N/A
Monsta X	"Now or Never"	The Code	Yes	I.M, Galactika	No	N/A	No	N/A
Monsta X	"In Time"	The Code	Yes	Ye-Yo!	Yes	Ye-Yo!	Yes	Ye-Yo!
Monsta X	"From Zero"	The Code	Yes	Wonho, I.M, Brother Su	No	N/A	No	N/A
Monsta X	"X"	The Code	Yes	I.M, Oh Min-ju	No	N/A	No	N/A
Monsta X	"Tropical Night"	The Code	Yes	I.M, Crucial Star	No	N/A	No	N/A
Monsta X	"Deja Vu"	The Code	Yes	I.M, JQ, Kan Eun-yu, Kim Hye-jung, Choi Ji-hye	No	N/A	No	N/A
DJ H.ONE	"1(One)"	Mix and the City OST	Yes	Mafly	No	N/A	No	N/A
Monsta X	"Lonely Christmas"	Non-album single	Yes	Nago, Ye-Yo!	No	N/A	No	N/A

=== 2018 ===
Artist(s)	Song	Album	Lyrics		Music		Arrangement	
Artist(s)	Song	Album	Credited	With	Credited	With	Credited	With
Monsta X	"Jealousy"	The Connect: Dejavu	Yes	Seo Ji-eum, I.M	No	N/A	No	N/A
Monsta X	"Destroyer"	The Connect: Dejavu	Yes	JQ, DADA, I.M	No	N/A	No	N/A
Monsta X	"Fallin'"	The Connect: Dejavu	Yes	Seo Ji-eum, I.M	No	N/A	No	N/A
Monsta X	"Crazy in Love"	The Connect: Dejavu	Yes	Galactika, I.M	No	N/A	No	N/A
Monsta X	"Lost in the Dream"	The Connect: Dejavu	Yes	Jung Yoon, Le'mon, Lee Hee-joo, I.M	No	N/A	No	N/A
Monsta X	"If Only"	The Connect: Dejavu	Yes	Wonho, I.M, Rich Jang	No	N/A	No	N/A
Monsta X	"Special"	The Connect: Dejavu	Yes	Ye-Yo!, I.M, Nago	Yes	Ye-Yo!, Nago	Yes	Ye-Yo!, Nago
Monsta X	"Aura"	Piece	Yes	Lee Jin-ho, Ok Jae-won	Yes	Lee Jin-ho, Ok Jae-won	Yes	Lee Jin-ho, Ok Jae-won
Kihyun, Jooheon	"Can't Breathe"	Partners for Justice OST	Yes	Earattack	No	N/A	No	N/A
Jooheon	"Red Carpet"	DWTD	Yes		Yes	Boycold	No	N/A
Jooheon	"Should I Do"	DWTD	Yes		No	N/A	Yes	9F
Jooheon	"Kang Baek-ho"	DWTD	Yes	Ye-Yo!	Yes	Ye-Yo!	Yes	Ye-Yo!
Jooheon	"Runway" feat. Killagramz	DWTD	Yes	Killagramz	No	N/A	No	N/A
Jooheon	"Manito"	DWTD	Yes	Ye-Yo!	Yes	Ye-Yo!	Yes	Ye-Yo!
Monsta X	"Underwater"	Take.1 Are You There?	Yes	I.M, Brother Su	No	N/A	No	N/A
Monsta X	"Shoot Out"	Take.1 Are You There?	Yes	Seo Ji-eum, I.M	No	N/A	No	N/A
Monsta X	"Heart Attack"	Take.1 Are You There?	Yes	Wonho, I.M	No	N/A	No	N/A
Monsta X	"널하다" (I Do Love U)	Take.1 Are You There?	Yes	I.M, Minhyuk, Wonho, Kihyun	No	N/A	No	N/A
Monsta X	"어디서 뭐해" (Mohae)	Take.1 Are You There?	Yes	I.M, Yoonseok, Wooki	No	N/A	No	N/A
Monsta X	"Oh My!"	Take.1 Are You There?	Yes	I.M, Jam Factory	No	N/A	No	N/A
Monsta X	"Myself"	Take.1 Are You There?	Yes	I.M, ZAYA	No	N/A	No	N/A
Monsta X	"By My Side"	Take.1 Are You There?	Yes	9F, I.M	Yes	9F	Yes	9F
Monsta X	"Spotlight" (Korean ver.)	Take.1 Are You There?	Yes	Wonho, I.M	No	N/A	No	N/A
Monsta X	"Shoot Out" (English ver.)	Non-album single	Yes	Seo Ji-eum, I.M	No	N/A	No	N/A

=== 2019 ===
Artist(s)	Song	Album	Lyrics		Music		Arrangement	
Artist(s)	Song	Album	Credited	With	Credited	With	Credited	With
Monsta X	"Alligator"	Take.2 We Are Here	Yes	Seo Ji-eum, I.M	No	N/A	No	N/A
Monsta X	"악몽" (Ghost)	Take.2 We Are Here	Yes	Jam Factory, I.M	No	N/A	No	N/A
Monsta X	"No Reason"	Take.2 We Are Here	Yes	Wonho, Brother Su, I.M	No	N/A	No	N/A
Monsta X	"Give Me Dat"	Take.2 We Are Here	Yes	Jung Yoon, I.M	No	N/A	No	N/A
Monsta X	"난기류" (Turbulence)	Take.2 We Are Here	Yes	I.M, Kim Sol-hee, Shin Sae-rom, JQ	No	N/A	No	N/A
Monsta X	"Rodeo"	Take.2 We Are Here	Yes	I.M, Kim Eun-yu, MOLA, TOMBOY, JQ	No	N/A	No	N/A
Monsta X	"Stealer"	Take.2 We Are Here	Yes	Seo Ji-eum, I.M, Jam Factory	No	N/A	No	N/A
Monsta X	"Party Time"	Take.2 We Are Here	Yes	I.M, Brother Su	No	N/A	No	N/A
Joohoney, I.M	"삼박자" (Triple Rhythm)	Unreleased, Performance exclusive	Yes	I.M, 9F, Wooki	Yes	I.M, 9F, Wooki	Yes	I.M, 9F, Wooki
Monsta X feat. French Montana	"Who Do U Love?"	All About Luv	Yes	Monsta X, French Montana, Torrey Jake, Conrad Noah Patrick, Henig Daniel Doron	Yes	Monsta X, French Montana, Torrey Jake, Conrad Noah Patrick, Henig Daniel Doron	No	N/A
Minhyuk feat. Joohoney	"옹심이"	Non-album single	Yes	Ye-Yo!	Yes	Ye-Yo!	Yes	Ye-Yo!
Monsta X	"Breathe For You"	Monsta X's Puppy Day OST	Yes	I.M, Wonho	No	N/A	No	N/A
Monsta X	"Alligator" (Japanese ver.)	Phenomenon	Yes	I.M, Seo Ji-eum	No	N/A	No	N/A
Monsta X	"Shoot Out" (Japanese ver.)	Phenomenon	Yes	I.M, Seo Ji-eum	No	N/A	No	N/A
Monsta X	"Follow"	Follow: Find You	Yes	I.M, Seo Ji-eum, Brother Su	No	N/A	No	N/A
Monsta X	"Monsta Truck"	Follow: Find You	Yes	I.M, Brother Su	No	N/A	No	N/A
Monsta X	"U R"	Follow: Find You	Yes	I.M, Yoonseok, Wooki	No	N/A	No	N/A
Monsta X	"Disaster"	Follow: Find You	Yes	I.M, Flying Lab	No	N/A	No	N/A
Monsta X	"Burn It Up"	Follow: Find You	Yes	I.M, Bono, JQ	No	N/A	No	N/A
Monsta X	"Mirror"	Follow: Find You	Yes	I.M, Wonho, Brother Su, Shownu	No	N/A	No	N/A
Monsta X	"See You Again"	Follow: Find You	Yes	9F, I.M	Yes	9F	Yes	9F
Monsta X	"Middle of the Night"	All About Luv	Yes	Monsta X, Ali Payami, John Mitchell	Yes	Monsta X, Ali Payami, John Mitchell	No	N/A

=== 2020 ===
Artist(s)	Song	Album	Lyrics		Music		Arrangement	
Artist(s)	Song	Album	Credited	With	Credited	With	Credited	With
Monsta X feat. Pitbull	"Beside U"	All About Luv	Yes	Monsta X, Armando Perez, Angel Lopez, Daniel Ryan Winsch, Eshy Gazit, Federico Vindver, Timothy Mosley	Yes	Monsta X, Armando Perez, Angel Lopez, Daniel Ryan Winsch, Eshy Gazit, Federico Vindver, Timothy Mosley	No	N/A
Cravity	"Jumper"	Season 1. Hideout: Remember Who We Are	Yes	9F	Yes	9F	Yes	9F
Monsta X	"Fantasia"	Fantasia X	Yes	I.M, Brother Su	No	N/A	No	N/A
Monsta X	"Flow"	Fantasia X	Yes	I.M, 9F	Yes	9F	Yes	9F
Monsta X	"Zone"	Fantasia X	Yes	I.M, Yoonseok, Wooki	No	N/A	No	N/A
Monsta X	"Chaotic"	Fantasia X	Yes	I.M, Flying Lab	No	N/A	No	N/A
Monsta X	"Beautiful Night"	Fantasia X	Yes	iHwak, Flow Blow	No	N/A	No	N/A
Monsta X	"It Ain't Over"	Fantasia X	Yes	I.M, Brother Su	No	N/A	No	N/A
Monsta X	"Stand Up"	Fantasia X	Yes	I.M, Ye-Yo!	Yes	Ye-Yo!	Yes	Ye-Yo!
Joohoney	"Intro: Ambition"	Psyche	Yes	9F	Yes	9F	Yes	9F
Joohoney	"Psyche"	Psyche	Yes	9F	Yes	9F	Yes	9F
Joohoney	"Dia"	Psyche	Yes	9F	Yes	9F	Yes	9F
Joohoney	"Smoky"	Psyche	Yes	9F	Yes	9F	Yes	9F
Joohoney feat. Kim Boa	"Dark & Cloudy"	Psyche	Yes	9F, Kim Boa	Yes	9F	Yes	9F
Joohoney	"King"	Psyche	Yes	9F	Yes	9F	Yes	9F
Joohoney	"Wingsuit" feat. Tem	Psyche	Yes	Wizrd, Tem	Yes	Wizrd	Yes	Wizrd
Monsta X	"Love Killa"	Fatal Love	Yes	Seo Ji-eum, I.M, Jeff Lewis, Andy Su Love	No	N/A	No	N/A
Monsta X	"Gasoline"	Fatal Love	Yes	Flyinglab, I.M	No	N/A	No	N/A
Monsta X	"Thriller"	Fatal Love	Yes	Lee Su-ran, danke, I.M	No	N/A	No	N/A
Monsta X	"Guess Who"	Fatal Love	Yes	danke, I.M	No	N/A	No	N/A
Monsta X	"Beastmode"	Fatal Love	Yes	9F, Eric Nam, I.M	Yes	9F, Eric Nam	Yes	9F
Monsta X	"Stand Together"	Fatal Love	Yes	Ye-Yo!	Yes	Ye-Yo!, Laser	Yes	Ye-Yo!
Monsta X	"Night View"	Fatal Love	Yes	I.M, Yoonseok, Wooki	No	N/A	No	N/A
Kei, Joohoney	"Ride Or Die"	Run On OST	Yes	Park Bo-jeong (Chansline), Ga-deul	No	N/A	No	N/A

=== 2021 ===
Artist(s)	Song	Album	Lyrics		Music		Arrangement	
Artist(s)	Song	Album	Credited	With	Credited	With	Credited	With
Monsta X	"Follow" (Japanese ver.)	Flavors of Love	Yes	I.M, Seo Ji-eum, Brother Su	No	N/A	No	N/A
Monsta X	"Fantasia" (Japanese ver.)	Flavors of Love	Yes	I.M, Brother Su	No	N/A	No	N/A
Monsta X	"Love Killa" (Japanese ver.)	Flavors of Love	Yes	I.M, Seo Ji-eum, Jeff Lewis, Andy Love	No	N/A	No	N/A
Monsta X	"Gambler"	One of a Kind	Yes	Ye-Yo!, I.M, Laser, Hwang Yu-bin, Jooyoung	Yes	Ye-Yo!	Yes	Ye-Yo!
Monsta X	"Heaven"	One of a Kind	Yes	Ye-Yo!, Laser, I.M	Yes	Ye-Yo!, Laser	Yes	Ye-Yo!
Monsta X	"Addicted"	One of a Kind	Yes	153/Joombas, San, I.M	Yes	San, Zenur, Fascinador, PRNCE, Kevin Leinster Jr., Shaquille Rayes, Alawn	Yes	Zenur, Fascinador, PRNCE
Monsta X	"Secrets"	One of a Kind	Yes	Hyungwon, Jantine Annika Heij, I.M, Justin Oh	No	N/A	No	N/A
Monsta X	"Rotate"	One of a Kind	Yes	I.M, Yoonseok, Wooki	No	N/A	No	N/A
Monsta X	"Livin' It Up" (Korean ver.)	One of a Kind	Yes	Enzu, Mun Sul-li, I.M	No	N/A	No	N/A
Monsta X	"Kiss or Death"	Non-album single	Yes	I.M, Zupiter	No	N/A	No	N/A
Monsta X	"Rush Hour"	No Limit	Yes	I.M, Ye-Yo!, Laser, Sam Carter, Brother Su	Yes	Ye-Yo!, Sam Carter, Billy Carvin, th!nk, Brother Su, Bae Ki-hyun	Yes	Ye-Yo!
Monsta X	"Autobahn"	No Limit	Yes	I.M, Yoonseok, Wooki	No	N/A	No	N/A
Monsta X	"Ride with U"	No Limit	Yes	Flying Lab, I.M	No	N/A	No	N/A
Monsta X	"Got Me in Chains"	No Limit	Yes	Wkly, Flying Lab, I.M	No	N/A	No	N/A
Monsta X	"Just Love"	No Limit	Yes	I.M, Yoonseok, Wooki	No	N/A	No	N/A
Monsta X	"Mercy"	No Limit	Yes	Hyungwon, Jantine Annika Heij, I.M, Justin Oh	No	N/A	No	N/A
Monsta X	"I Got Love"	No Limit	Yes	I.M, Ye-Yo!, Laser	Yes	Ye-Yo!, Laser	Yes	Ye-Yo!

=== 2022 ===
Artist(s)	Song	Album	Lyrics		Music		Arrangement	
Artist(s)	Song	Album	Credited	With	Credited	With	Credited	With
Monsta X	"Love"	Shape of Love	Yes	I.M, Ye-Yo!, Laser, Roydo, Brother Su	Yes	Ye-Yo!, Laser, Roydo	Yes	Ye-Yo!
Monsta X	"사랑한다" (Saranghanda)	Shape of Love	Yes	I.M, Ye-Yo!, Laser	Yes	Ye-Yo!, Bae Ki-hyun, Laser	Yes	Ye-Yo!, Bae Ki-hyun
Monsta X	"Wildfire"	Shape of Love	Yes	I.M, Hyungwon, Justin Oh, Jantine Annika Heij	Yes	I.M, Hyungwon, Justin Oh, Jantine Annika Heij	No	N/A
Joohoney	"Voice"	Non-album single	Yes	Ye-Yo!	Yes	Ye-Yo!	Yes	Ye-Yo!

=== 2023 ===
Artist(s)	Song	Album	Lyrics		Music		Arrangement	
Artist(s)	Song	Album	Credited	With	Credited	With	Credited	With
Monsta X	"Beautiful Liar"	Reason	Yes	Hyungwon, I.M, Brother Su, Kim Eung-ju	No	N/A	No	N/A
Monsta X	"Crescendo"	Reason	Yes	I.M, Ye-Yo!	Yes	Ye-Yo!	Yes	Ye-Yo!
Monsta X	"Lone Ranger"	Reason	Yes	Hyungwon, I.M, Jantine Annika Heij, Justin Oh	No	N/A	No	N/A
Monsta X	"Deny"	Reason	Yes	I.M, Yoonseok, Wooki	No	N/A	No	N/A
Monsta X	"It's Okay"	Reason	Yes	I.M, Laser, Ye-Yo!	Yes	Laser, Ye-Yo!	Yes	Ye-Yo!
Joohoney, Kihyun	"Awake"	Our Game: LG Twins OST	Yes	CLOVD, Kwon Deok-geun, Biggyu	No	N/A	No	N/A
DKB	"Turning Point"	Peak Time – <Final Round>	Yes	Ye-Yo!	Yes	Ye-Yo!	Yes	Ye-Yo!
Joohoney	"Freedom"	Lights	Yes	Ye-Yo!, BK	Yes	Ye-Yo!, Laser	Yes	Ye-Yo!
Joohoney	"Hype Energy"	Lights	Yes	Ye-Yo!	Yes	Ye-Yo!	Yes	Ye-Yo!
Joohoney	"Voice"	Lights	Yes	Ye-Yo!	Yes	Ye-Yo!	Yes	Ye-Yo!
Joohoney	"Evolution"	Lights	Yes	Ye-Yo!, Laser, BK	Yes	Ye-Yo!, Laser	Yes	Ye-Yo!
Joohoney feat. G.Soul	"Monologue"	Lights	Yes	Ye-Yo!, G.Soul	Yes	Ye-Yo!, G.Soul	Yes	Ye-Yo!
Joohoney	"Don't Worry, Be Happy"	Lights	Yes	Ye-Yo!	Yes	Ye-Yo!	Yes	Ye-Yo!
Joohoney	"Hip Hop"	Behind Your Touch OST	Yes	Ye-Yo!, Laser	Yes	Ye-Yo!	Yes	Ye-Yo!

=== 2025 ===
Artist(s)	Song	Album	Lyrics		Music		Arrangement	
Artist(s)	Song	Album	Credited	With	Credited	With	Credited	With
Cravity	"Underdog"	Dare to Crave	Yes	Ye-Yo!, Laser, Serim, Allen	Yes	Ye-Yo!, Laser	Yes	Ye-Yo!
Monsta X	"Do What I Want"	The X	Yes	I.M	Yes	Bekuh Boom, Blaise Railey, Elie Jay Rizk, Imad Royal	No	N/A
Monsta X	"Savior"	The X	Yes	I.M, Yoonseok, Wooki	No	N/A	No	N/A
Monsta X	"Tuscan Leather"	The X	Yes	I.M, BK, Ye-Yo!	Yes	Laser, Ye-Yo!	Yes	Ye-Yo!
Monsta X	"Catch Me Now"	The X	Yes	I.M, Moon Seol-li	No	N/A	No	N/A

=== 2026 ===
Artist(s)	Song	Album	Lyrics		Music		Arrangement	
Artist(s)	Song	Album	Credited	With	Credited	With	Credited	With
Joohoney feat. Rei	"Push"	光 (Insanity)	Yes	Ye-Yo!, Laser	Yes	Ye-Yo!, Laser	No	N/A
Joohoney feat. Tiger JK	"Touch the Sky"	光 (Insanity)	No	N/A	Yes	Ye-Yo!	No	N/A
Joohoney feat. Muhammad Ali	"Sting"	光 (Insanity)	Yes	Ye-Yo!, Muhammad Ali	Yes	Ye-Yo!, Laser	No	N/A
Joohoney	"No Brain No Pain"	光 (Insanity)	Yes	Ye-Yo!	Yes	Ye-Yo!, Laser	No	N/A
Joohoney	"Fear"	光 (Insanity)	Yes	Ye-Yo!	Yes	Ye-Yo!	No	N/A
Joohoney	"광" (Gwang)	光 (Insanity)	Yes	Ye-Yo!	Yes	Ye-Yo!, Simon Gaudes, Tim Gomringer (Cubeatz), Kevin Gomringer (Cubeatz)	No	N/A
Joohoney	"Bite"	光 (Insanity)	Yes		Yes	Yannick Rastogi, Zacharie Alexandre Raymond, Zegon, Laudz	No	N/A
Monsta X	"Magic"	The Phase	Yes	Bang Hye-hyun, Kim Anna (ARTiffect)	No	N/A	No	N/A
Monsta X	"Type X"	The Phase	Yes	Black Nine	No	N/A	No	N/A
Monsta X	"Survivor"	The Phase	Yes	Ye-Yo!, Laser	Yes	Ye-Yo!, Laser	Yes	Ye-Yo!, Laser
