= White Love (disambiguation) =

White Love is a 1979 romance film from Japan.

White Love may also refer to:

- White Love (Starship Planet song), a 2022 single by labelmates K.Will, Sistar and Boyfriend
- White Love (Speed song), a 1997 single by Japanese girl group Speed

== See also ==
- "White Lovers" (Shiawase na Toki)
