= All My Love for You (TV series) =

South Korean situation comedy

- Hangul: 몽땅 내 사랑
- RR: Mongttang nae sarang
- MR: Mongttang nae sarang
- Genre: Sitcom
- Written by: Park Min-jung; Kim Yoon-hee; Lee So-jung; Han Seol-hee; Yang Seo-yoon; Jo Sung-hee
- Directed by: Kang Young-sun; Hwang Gyo-jin
- Starring: Kim Kap-soo; Park Mi-sun; Jo Kwon; Ga-in; Yoon Doo-joon; Jun Tae-soo; Yoon Seung-ah
- Opening theme: "Loving You" by Highlight
- Ending theme: "Beautiful Girl" by Lizzy
- Country of origin: South Korea
- Original language: Korean
- No. of seasons: 2
- No. of episodes: 210

Production
- Producers: Kwon Ik-joon; Jun Jin-soo
- Running time: 30 minutes Mondays to Fridays at 19:45 (KST)

Original release
- Network: MBC TV
- Release: November 5, 2010 – September 16, 2011

All My Love for You (Korean: 몽땅 내 사랑; RR: Mongttang Nae Sarang; lit. 'All My Love') is a South Korean sitcom starring Kim Kap-soo, Park Mi-sun, Jo Kwon, Ga-in, Yoon Doo-joon, Jun Tae-soo and Yoon Seung-ah. It broadcast on MBC from November 5, 2010, to September 16, 2011, on Mondays to Fridays at 19:45 (KST).

== Cast ==
=== Kim family ===
- Kim Kap-soo as Director Kim
- Park Mi-sun as Park Mi-sun
- Kim Young-ok as Kim Young-ok
- Kim Hye-ok as Kim Hye-ok/Kim Gab-sun (Ep. 120–210)
- Jo Kwon as Hwang Ok-yub
- Ga-in as Hwang Geum-ji (Ep. 1–135)
- Yoon Seung-ah as Kim Saet-byul
- Jun Tae-soo as Jeon Tae-soo (Ep. 1–60)
- Jin Yi-han as Jeon Tae-poong (Ep. 83–210)
- Jung Ho-bin as Butler Kim

=== Bang family ===
- Bang Eun-hee as Bang Eun-hee (Ep. 2–210)
- Yeon Woo-jin as Bang Woo-jin
- Yoon Doo-joon as Yoon Doo-joon (Ep. 3–210)
- Park Soo-ah^{1} as Park Soon-deok (Ep. 64, 78–210)
- Kim Na-young as Kim Na-young
- Han Young as Han Young (Ep. 67–210)

=== Extended cast ===
- Park Cho-rong as Cho-rong (Ep. 125–210)
- Choi Na-kyung as Teacher Jung (Ep. 1–86)
- Baek No-sik as President Choi
- Yoo Hyung-kwan as Director Lee
- Hong Soon-chang as Kim Gab-sub, Director Kim's cousin (Ep. 129)
- Choi Hyo-eun as Jin-ah

=== Cameo appearances ===
- Yoon Jong-shin as tutor
- Nine Muses as Director Kim's fan girls (Ep. 6)
- Nichkhun as Ok-yub's human substitute (Ep. 16)
- Park Hwi-soon as double eyelid surgery patient (Ep. 18)
- Han Sun-hwa as Han Sun-hwa, Geum-ji's friend (Ep. 27)
- Shindong as Geum-ji's blind date (Ep. 43-44)
- Kim Soo-yeon as Doo-joon's classmate (Ep. 70)
- Byun Ki-soo as billiards player (Ep. 72)
- Kim Shin-young as Kim Se-byul, the maid (Ep. 77)
- Leeteuk as Seung-ah's blind date (Ep. 143)
- David Oh as English teacher (Ep. 154)
- Bang Si-hyuk as audition judge (Ep. 160)
- Uee as Kim Yu-jin (ep 182, 210)
- Lee Gi-kwang as Doo-joon's rival in love (Ep. 193)
- Jo Young-min as high school student
- Jo Kwang-min as high school student
- Minwoo as high school student

== Notes ==
- ^{1}Credited as Park Soo-young.
