= Kim Dong-hyun (actor) =

South Korean singer (born 1989)

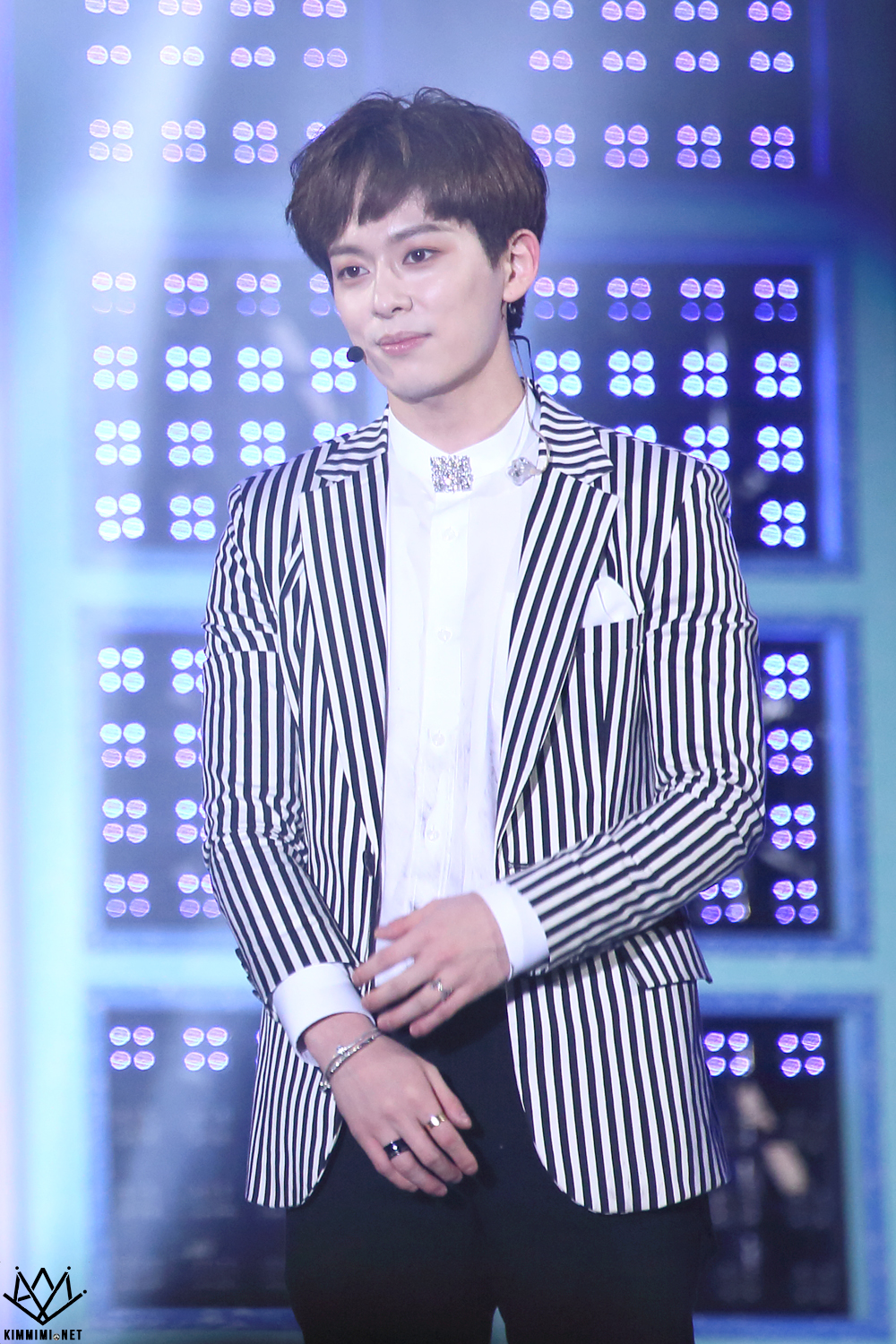
- Kim at the Yangsan Grand Prize Festival on May 16, 2015
- Born: Kim Dong-hyun; 12 February 1989 (age 37); Seoul, South Korea
- Other name: Kim Dong-hyeon
- Education: Myongji University (Musical Science)
- Occupations: Actor; model; singer
- Years active: 2008–present
- Agent: SidusHQ
- Known for: The Miracle; Good Morning Double-Decker Bus; The 1km Distance Between Us

Kim Dong-hyun (born 12 February 1989), also known mononymously as Donghyun, is a South Korean actor, model and singer. He is known for his leads roles in dramas such as The Miracle, Good Morning Double-Decker Bus and The 1km Distance Between Us. He is a member of BF.

== Biography and career ==
He was born on February 12, 1989, in Seoul. He completed his studies in Myongji University. In addition to his musical activities, he also joined acting, with his first acting in MBC drama Elephant in 2008. Kim and his bandmates made their acting debuts in the 2013 Japanese idol drama GOGO Ikemen 5. He also starred in the 2016 Korean television drama The Miracle.

== Discography ==
=== As lead artist ===
Title	Year	Peak chart positions	Album
Title	Year	KOR Down.	Album
"Happy Death Day"	2026	—	Happy Death Day

== Filmography ==
=== Television series ===
Year	Title	Role	Ref.
2008	Elephant	Park Jin-seok	
2011	Love and War 2	Dong-hyeon	
2014	Love Frequency 37.2	Ko Min-ho	
2015	The 1km Distance Between Us	Park Jae-woo	
2015	Unkind Ladies	Idol group member	
2016	The Miracle	Bae Hae-sung	
2017	Good Morning Double-Decker Bus	Jung Dong-hyun	
2018	Oh! My Captain	Kim Soo-hyun	
2018	Life Book Worm	Kim-yeong	
2018	Bloom	Dong-yun	
2020	Love Is Annoying, but I Hate Being Lonely!	Lee Seon-hyun	
2021	College Life That Everyone Wants	Do-heon	
2023	Strangers Again	Joo Sung-yoon	

=== Film ===
Year	Title	Role	Language	Ref.
2013	GOGO Ikemen 5	Kanade/Kan Gon	Japanese	
2021	Insa	Tae-soo	Korean	

=== Television show ===
Year	Title	Role	Ref.
2022	God of Lawyer	Host	

== Awards and nominations ==
- 2014 Asia Model Festival Awards: Male Rookie of the Year (Musical Category)
