= Seventh Color =

SEVENTH COLOR
- HMV/LAWSON Limited Edition Album Cover

Studio album by Boyfriend
- Released: July 23, 2014
- Recorded: 2013–2014
- Genre: J-pop, dance-pop
- Language: Japanese
- Label: Being Group

Boyfriend chronology
Obsession (2014)	SEVENTH COLOR (2014)	Witch (2014)

Singles from SEVENTH COLOR
- 1. "My Avatar" Released: March 26, 2014; 2. "Startup!" Released: May 28, 2014

Seventh Color is the second Japanese studio album by the South Korean boy group Boyfriend. It was released in three different versions on July 23, 2014.

== Background ==
It was revealed on May 31, 2014, that Boyfriend will be releasing their second Japanese full-length album. The album will be released in three different versions: Standard Edition, Limited Edition CD + DVD, and LAWSON/HMV Limited Edition CD + DVD.

== Track listing ==
Standard Edition CD
No.	Title	Length
1.	"Brand New Day"	4:49
2.	"Here!"	3:02
3.	"Startup!"	4:08
4.	"Don't Stop" (Kwangmin and Minwoo)	3:00
5.	"Sexy Love"	4:28
6.	"Keep on Lovin' You"	4:30
7.	"やめないでSummer"	4:07
8.	"SAYONARA"	4:38
9.	"My Avatar"	4:38
10.	"Freedom"	3:47
11.	"CRAZY FLY"	4:55
12.	"The Same Sky"	5:24

Limited Edition [CD + DVD]
No.	Title	Length
1.	"Brand New Day"	4:49
2.	"Here!"	3:02
3.	"Startup!"	4:08
4.	"Don't Stop" (Kwangmin and Minwoo)	3:00
5.	"Sexy Love"	4:28
6.	"Keep on Lovin' You"	4:30
7.	"やめないでSummer"	4:07
8.	"SAYONARA"	4:38
9.	"My Avatar"	4:38
10.	"Freedom"	3:47
11.	"CRAZY FLY"	4:55
12.	"The Same Sky"	5:24
13.	"Give me the Light" (Donghyun Solo)	3:53
14.	"My Way" (Hyunseong Solo)	3:10
15.	"Here!" (Music Video + Making of)

LAWSON/HMV Limited Edition [CD + DVD]
No.	Title	Length
1.	"Brand New Day"	4:49
2.	"Here!"	3:02
3.	"Startup!"	4:08
4.	"Don't Stop" (Kwangmin and Minwoo)	3:00
5.	"Sexy Love"	4:28
6.	"Keep on Lovin' You"	4:30
7.	"やめないでSummer"	4:07
8.	"SAYONARA"	4:38
9.	"My Avatar"	4:38
10.	"Freedom"	3:47
11.	"CRAZY FLY"	4:55
12.	"The Same Sky"	5:24
13.	"どうしよう..." (Jeongmin Solo)	3:57
14.	"Time" (Youngmin Solo)	3:46
15.	"Okinawa Date with Boyfriend" (DVD)
