= Melody of Eyes =

- Limited edition cover

Single by Boyfriend

from the album Seventh Mission
- B-side: "To Moon"
- Released: March 27, 2013
- Recorded: 2013
- Genre: J-pop, Dance-pop
- Length: 18:22
- Label: Being Group; Starship Entertainment
- Songwriter: La Terre
- Producer: Daiko Nagato

Boyfriend singles chronology
"I Yah" (2013)	"Melody of Eyes" (2013)	"ON&ON" (2013)

"Melody of Eyes (Hitomi no Melody)" is the third Japanese single by the South Korean boy band Boyfriend. It was released on March 27 in 4 different editions. "Hitomi no Melody" was the 44th ending theme song of long time Japanese anime series Detective Conan and TO MOON was used as the ending theme song of Boyfriend's TV show in Japan entitled, Tokyo Etoile Academy of Music last January and February 2013.

== Background ==
The album was announced by the group's Japanese official website, with details of the album release and along with a release of the group's first DVD 1st Live DVD [Love Communication 2012~XMass Bell~]. The single was released in four different editions: a Normal Edition [CD] consists of 2 song with 2 instrumentals and extra trading card in 1 of 7; a Limited Edition [CD +DVD] with "Hitomi no Melody" music video and making of and a trading card (1 of 7); Lawson HMV Limited Edition [CD + DVD] with 40 page full color photobook and trading card (1 of 7); Lawson HMV Limited Edition [CD + DVD](Detective Conan version) with Hitomi no Melody (TV SIZE) and Detective Conan card (1 of 2).

== Singles ==
Hitomi no Melody/Melody of Eyes, the song was picked up as the 44th ending theme song for popular Japanese anime series Detective Conan.

== Promotion ==
Melody of Eyes makes to top five for six days and their highest ranked is second place on Oricon, and they ranked number one on weekly chart of Billboard Hot Animation.

== Track listing ==
CD+DVD edition
No.	Title	Lyrics	Music	Arrangement	Length
1.	"Melody of Eyes (瞳のメロディ)"	La Terre	K&K Factory	Hitoshi Munakata	4:59
2.	"TO MOON"	SONG SOO YOON・Keiko Serizawa	HAN JAE HO・KIM SEUNG SOO・AN JUN SUNG	HAN JAE HO・KIM SEUNG SOO・AN JUN SUNG・HONG SEUNG HYUN	4:12
3.	"Melody of Eyes (瞳のメロディ)" (Instrumental)		K&K Factory	Hitoshi Munakata	4:59
4.	"TO MOON" (Instrumental)		HAN JAE HO・KIM SEUNG SOO・AN JUN SUNG	HAN JAE HO・KIM SEUNG SOO・AN JUN SUNG・HONG SEUNG HYUN	4:12
Total length:					18:22

== Music videos ==
Year	Song	Length	Notes	Official MV on YouTube
2013	"Melody of Eyes" (short ver.)	2:18		Melody of Eyes (Short Version) on YouTube

== Charts ==
=== Oricon ===
Oricon Chart	Peak	Debut sales	Sales total
Daily Singles Chart	2	10,114	—
Weekly Singles Chart	4	34,010	—
Monthly Singles Chart	20	36,004	—
Yearly Singles Chart	—	—	—

==== Other charts ====
Chart	Peak position
Billboard Japan Hot 100	5
Billboard Japan Hot Singles sales	3
Billboard Japan Hot Animation	1

== Release history ==
Country	Date	Format	Label
Japan	March 27, 2013	CD, Digital download	Being Group
