= Love Style =

- 1st Extended Play Back Cover

EP by Boyfriend
- Released: June 13, 2012
- Recorded: 2012
- Genre: K-pop, dance
- Length: 17:34 (17 minutes, 34 seconds)
- Label: Starship Entertainment
- Producer: Sweetune

Boyfriend chronology
We Are Boyfriend (2012)	Love Style (2012)	Be My Shine (2012)

Singles from Love Style
- 1. "Love Style" Released: June 13, 2012

Love Style is the debut mini-album by South Korean boy band Boyfriend. The mini-album was released digitally on June 13, 2012. Followed by the release of the physical album on June 14, 2012.

== Background and promotion ==
On June 7, 2012, Starship Entertainment releases a floral themed comeback teaser image. The picture shows the members who are dressed with floral and pastel toned clothes to match up with their cute and friendly image.

The following day, Boyfriend released the album jacket for their mini album "Love Style" through their official Twitter account. This time the image shows a look which was inspired by 'downster hipster' fashion of New York that is contrasting the floral themed image that they first unveiled. Starship Entertainment revealed, “This album will show a definite change along with a reflection of the current trends interpreted in Boyfriend’s own style. They’ll be trying some of the hottest looks for men this year like colored and patterned suits along with street fashion.”

It was also announced that members Jo Kwang Min and No Min Woo participated in writing their raps for the four tracks of the mini-album.

The teaser of their title track "Love Style" was released on June 11, 2012.

The group started promoting "Love Style" on Mnet's M! Countdown on June 13, 2012. It was also promoted on the shows Music Bank, Music Core and Inkigayo. The song "One Day (소나기)" was used for the comeback week special performances.

== Track listing ==
No.	Title	Lyrics	Music	Length
1.	"I'm In Love (Intro)"			1:05
2.	"Love Style (러브스타일)"	No Min Woo, Jo Kwang Min, Han Jae Ho, Kim Seung Su, Song Soo Yun	Han Jae Ho, Kim Seung Su	3:11
3.	"Super Hero"	No Min Woo, Jo Kwang Min, Han Jae Ho, Kim Seung Su, Song Soo Yun	Lee Joo Hyung, G- High	3:48
4.	"소나기 (One Day)"	No Min Woo, Jo Kwang Min, Han Jae Ho, Kim Seung Su, Song Soo Yun	Han Jae Ho, Kim Seung Su	3:22
5.	"완전한 여인 (Wonderful Girl)"			3:04
6.	"쉽게 보지마 (Do)"	No Min Woo, Jo Kwang Min, Han Jae Ho, Kim Seung Su, Song Soo Yun	Han Jae Ho, Kim Seung Su, Yue	3:03
7.	"Love Style" (Instrumental)		Han Jae Ho, Kim Seung Su	3:11
Total length:				17:34

== Charts ==
=== Album chart ===
Chart	Peak position
South Korea (Hanteo Weekly Album Chart)	1
South Korea (Gaon Weekly Album Chart)	2
South Korea (Gaon Monthly Album Chart)	6

=== Sales ===
Chart	Sales
Gaon physical sales	24,562+ (South Korea); 2,652+ (Japan)

=== Digital chart ===
Year	Title	Peak positions		Album
Year	Title	KOR	USA	Album
Year	Title	Gaon	Billboard K-pop Hot 100	Album
2012	"Love Style"	55	46	Love Style

== Music programs ==
Song	Peak position	
Song	M! Countdown	Music Bank
"Love Style"	14	-

== Videography ==
Year	Song	Length	Notes	Official MV on YouTube
2012	"Love Style"	3:12		Love Style; Love Style (Choreography Practice Version)

== Release history ==
Country	Date	Format	Label
South Korea	June 13, 2012	Digital download	Starship Entertainment LOEN Entertainment
South Korea	June 14, 2012	CD	Starship Entertainment LOEN Entertainment
