= I Miss You (Boyfriend song) =

- I Miss You Type A Cover

Single by Boyfriend
- Released: February 22, 2017
- Recorded: 2017
- Genre: J-pop
- Label: Kiss Entertainment; Starship Entertainment
- Songwriters: Steven Lee; Jimmy Richard

Boyfriend singles chronology
"Jackpot" (2016)	"I Miss You" (2017)	"Summer" (2017)

"I Miss You" is a Japanese-language song by South Korean boy band Boyfriend from their ninth Japanese single album of the same name. It's also their third overall Japanese single released under Kiss Entertainment. The single was released physically and digitally on February 22, 2017.

== Track listing ==
Limited Edition [CD + DVD]
No.	Title	Length
1.	"I Miss You"	3:48
2.	"Rose"	3:44
3.	"Another World"	4:51
4.	"Last Smile"	3:51
5.	"I Miss You" (Instrumental)	3:46
6.	"DVD" (PV + PV Making)

Type A
No.	Title	Length
1.	"I Miss You"	3:48
2.	"Rose"	3:44
3.	"I Miss You" (Instrumental)	3:46
4.	"Rose" (Instrumental)	3:42

Type B
No.	Title	Length
1.	"I Miss You"	3:48
2.	"Amazing World"	4:51
3.	"I Miss You" (Instrumental)	3:46
4.	"Amazing World" (Instrumental)	4:49

Type C
No.	Title	Length
1.	"I Miss You"	3:48
2.	"Last Smile"	3:51
3.	"I Miss You" (Instrumental)	3:46
4.	"Last Smile" (Instrumental)	3:49

Individual Member Covers
No.	Title	Length
1.	"I Miss You"	3:48

== Music videos ==
Year	Song	Length	Notes	Official MV on YouTube
2017	"I Miss You"	3:47	Full PV	I Miss You on YouTube

== Release history ==
Country	Date	Format	Label
Japan	February 22, 2017	CD; Digital download	Kiss Entertainment Starship Entertainment
