= Jo Kwang-min =

South Korean singer

- 조광민
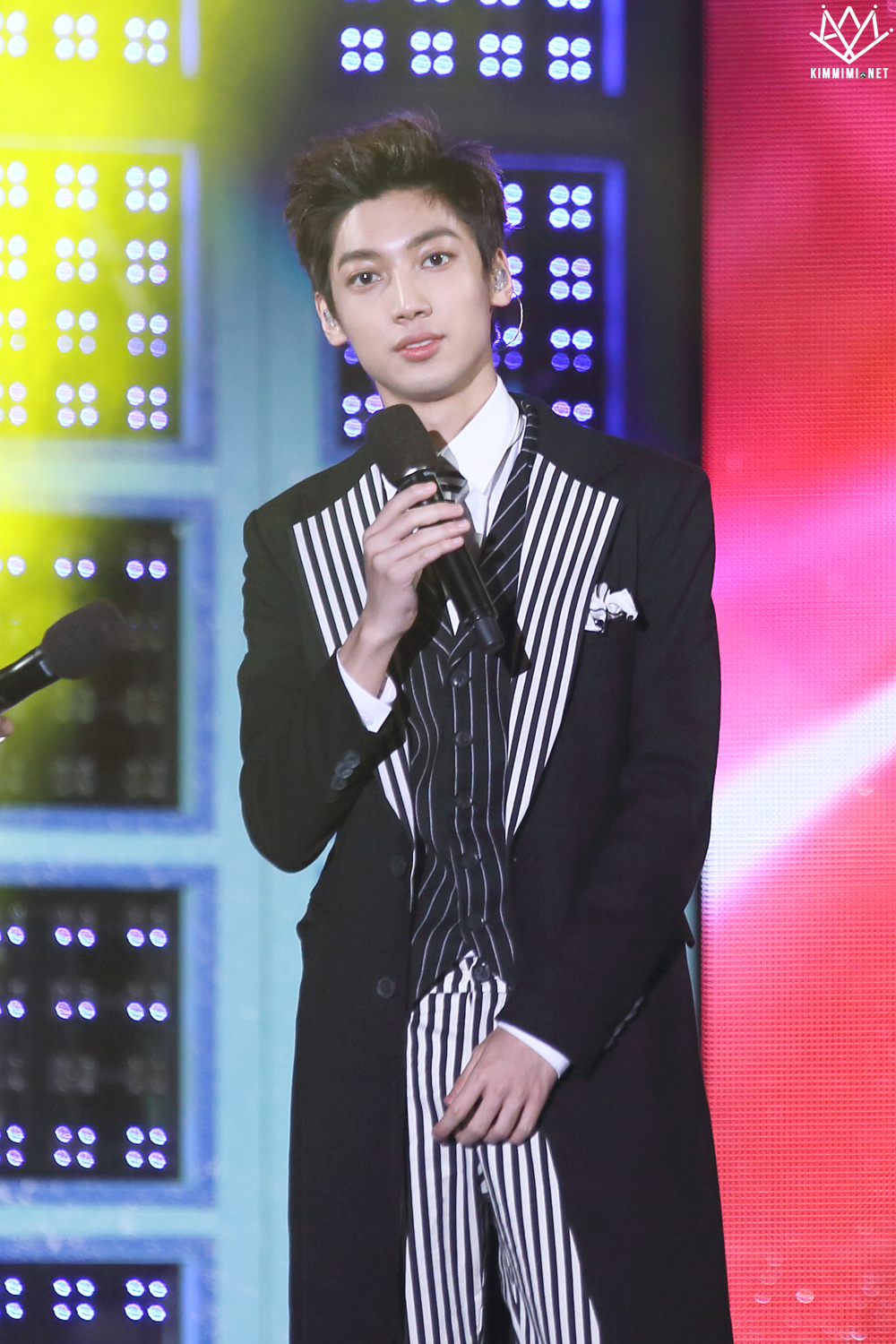
- Jo at the 2015 Yangsan Awards Festival
- Born: 24 April 1995 (age 31); Seoul, South Korea
- Education: School of Performing Arts Seoul
- Occupations: Actor; model; rapper
- Years active: 2002–present
- Agent: Starship Entertainment
- Known for: Boyfriend (band); The Magic Thousand - Character Classic; Ode to the Goose; All My Love For You
- Height: 1.8 m (5 ft 11 in)
- Family: Jo Young-min (twin brother)

Jo Kwang-min (Korean: 조광민, born 24 April 1995) is a South Korean actor, model and rapper. He is a member of Boyfriend.

== Biography and career ==
He was born on 24 April 1995 in Seoul. He is the younger twin brother of Jo Youngmin. He and his older brother Jo Young-min trained under JYP Entertainment for two years. They started modeling since they were children and started appearing in various commercials. By their 100th day mark of being child actors, the twins had appeared in over 300 commercials. He also started to appear in various dramas and movies.

== Discography ==
=== Singles ===
Title	Year	Album
"Hold on Tight"	2021	Non-album single
"We on the Moon"	2022	Afterimage Project Part.2 'We on the Moon'
"Fourteen"	2023	Non-album single
"Mayday!" (featuring Yook Sung-jae)	2023	Awwww
"Movie Scene"	2024	Non-album single

== Filmography ==
=== Television ===
Year	Title	Role	Ref.
2002	Saxophone and Chapssaltteok	Kang Sang-gyu	
2003	Country Princess	Lee Jin	
2010	All My Love for You	High School Student	
2012–2013	Cheongdam-dong Alice	Yeon	
2014	The Magic Thousand - Character Classic	Lee Rang	
2015	Unkind Ladies	Idol group member	

=== Film ===
Year	Title	Role	Language	Ref.
2013	GOGO Ikemen 5	Yoon Shi Hoo	Korean	
2019	Ode to the Goose	Lee Hyun's younger brother	Korean	
