= Jo Young-min =

South Korean singer

- 조영민
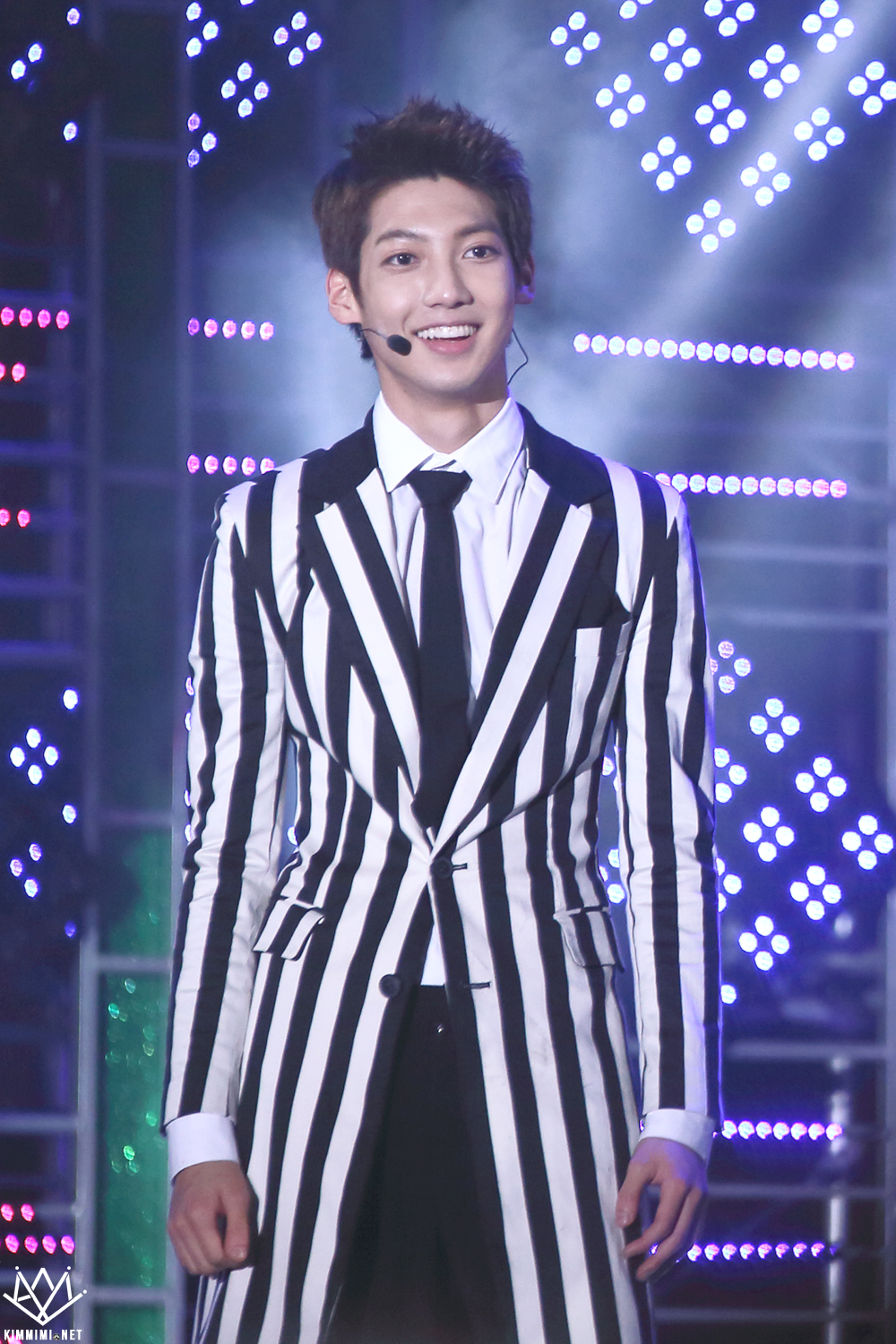
- Jo at the 2015 Yangsan Awards Festival
- Born: 24 April 1995 (age 31); Seoul, South Korea
- Education: School of Performing Arts Seoul
- Occupations: Actor; model; singer
- Years active: 2002–present
- Agent: Starship Entertainment
- Known for: Boyfriend (band); High Kick! Save the Family; All My Love For You
- Height: 1.8 m (5 ft 11 in)
- Family: Jo Kwang-min (twin brother)

Jo Young-min (Korean: 조영민; born 24 April 1995) is a South Korean actor, model and singer. He is a member of Boyfriend.

== Biography and career ==
Born on April 24, 1995 in Seoul, Jo Youngmin is the older twin by 6 minutes over his younger twin brother Jo Kwangmin. He and Kwangmin trained under JYP Entertainment for two years. They started modeling since they were children and appeared in various commercials. By their 100th day mark of being child actors, the twins had appeared in over 300 commercials. Jo Youngmin also appears in various dramas and movies.

== Filmography ==
=== Television ===
| Year | Title | Role | Ref. |
|---|---|---|---|
| 2002 | Saxophone and Chapssaltteok | Kang Sang-ho | |
| 2003 | Country Princess | Lee Hoon | |
| 2006 | High Kick! | Yoon Ho | |
| 2010 | All My Love for You | High School Student | |
| 2015 | Save the Family | Ji Won | |
| 2015 | Unkind Ladies | Idol group member | |
| 2019 | My Name is Trot | Han | |

=== Film ===
| Year | Title | Role | Language | Ref. |
|---|---|---|---|---|
| 2010 | The Warrior's Way | Yang | Korean | |
| 2013 | GOGO Ikemen 5 | Akiya / Yoon Ji Hoo | Korean | |
| 2019 | Rainbow Playground | Hyun Soo | Korean | |
| 2019 | A History of Jealousy | Jang | Korean | |
| 2019 | Ode to the Goose | Lee hyun | Korean | |
| 2022 | Tubepet Company | Ban Seok | Korean | |
| TBA | Dogs and Cats Live in Our Company | Young-min | Korean | |
