= My Avatar =

"My Avatar / Dark Carnival"
- Standard Edition Album Cover

Single by Boyfriend
- Released: March 26, 2014
- Recorded: 2014
- Genre: J-pop, dance
- Length: 4:39
- Label: Being Group; Starship Entertainment
- Songwriters: James Gicho, La Terre, Anders Sven Wigelius, Erik Per Wigelius

Boyfriend singles chronology
"Pinky Santa" (2013)	"My Avatar / Dark Carnival" (2014)	"Startup!" (2014)

"My Avatar" is the fifth Japanese single by South Korean boy band Boyfriend from their 5th Japanese single album of the same name. This single was released physically on March 26, 2014.

== Background and promotion ==
On March 6, 2014, Boyfriend released the PV teaser for their double A-side single "My Avatar". In the teaser, the members wore black and white outfits and make up, showing their manly charisma. The single was released in 4 different versions: Standard Edition (CD), Limited Edition A (CD+DVD), Limited Edition B (CD+DVD), and LAWSON/HMV Limited Edition (2CD).

== Track listing ==
Standard Edition CD
No.	Title	Length
1.	"My Avatar"	4:39
2.	"Dark Carnival"	4:00
3.	"My Avatar" (Instrumental)	4:39
4.	"Dark Carnival" (Instrumental)	4:00

Limited Edition A [CD + DVD]
No.	Title	Length
1.	"My Avatar"	4:39
2.	"Dark Carnival"	4:00
3.	"My Avatar" (Instrumental)	4:39
4.	"Dark Carnival" (Instrumental)	4:00
5.	"My Avatar" (Music video + Dance Ver. + Making of)

Limited Edition B [CD + DVD]
No.	Title	Length
1.	"My Avatar"	4:39
2.	"Dark Carnival"	4:00
3.	"My Avatar" (Instrumental)	4:39
4.	"Dark Carnival" (Instrumental)	4:00
5.	"Bonus DVD"

[LAWSON/HMV Limited Edition] (2CD)
No.	Title	Length
1.	"My Avatar"	4:39
2.	"Dark Carnival"	4:00
3.	"My Avatar" (Instrumental)	4:39
4.	"Dark Carnival" (Instrumental)	4:00
5.	"Love Community Radio Station" (Disc 2)

== Music videos ==
Year	Song	Length	Notes	Official MV on YouTube
2014	"My Avatar"	4:39	Full PV	My Avatar on YouTube

== Charts ==
=== Oricon ===
Oricon Chart	Peak	Debut sales	Sales Total
Daily Singles Chart	4	—	—
Weekly Singles Chart	6	23,145+	—
Monthly Singles Chart	22	23,654+	—
