= Jackpot (Boyfriend song) =

- Type A Album Cover

Single by Boyfriend
- Released: November 2, 2016
- Recorded: 2016
- Genre: J-pop
- Label: Kiss Entertainment; Starship Entertainment

Boyfriend singles chronology
"Glider" (2016)	"Jackpot" (2016)	"I Miss You" (2017)

"Jackpot" is a Japanese-language song, and the eighth Japanese single, by South Korean boy band Boyfriend from their eighth Japanese single album of the same name. This was their second single released under Kiss Entertainment in the Japanese market. The single was released physically, in four different versions, on November 2, 2016.

== Track listing ==
Limited Edition [CD + DVD]
No.	Title	Length
1.	"Jackpot"	3:53
2.	"Nightmare"	3:29
3.	"B & D"	3:17
4.	"Merry Christmas For U"	5:01
5.	"Jackpot" (Instrumental)	4:51
6.	"DVD" (PV + PV Making)

Type A
No.	Title	Length
1.	"Jackpot"	3:53
2.	"Nightmare"	3:29
3.	"Jackpot" (Instrumental)	3:51
4.	"Nightmare" (Instrumental)	3:27

Type B
No.	Title	Length
1.	"Jackpot"	3:51
2.	"B & D"	3:17
3.	"Jackpot" (Instrumental)	4:22
4.	"B & D" (Instrumental)	3:15

Type C
No.	Title	Length
1.	"Jackpot"	3:53
2.	"Merry Christmas For U"	5:01
3.	"Jackpot" (Instrumental)	3:51
4.	"Merry Christmas For U" (Instrumental)	4:59

Individual Member Covers
No.	Title	Length
1.	"Jackpot"	3:53

== Music videos ==
Year	Song	Length	Notes	Official MV on YouTube
2016	"Jackpot"	3:52	Full PV	Jackpot on YouTube

== Release history ==
Country	Date	Format	Label
Japan	November 2, 2016	CD; Digital download	Kiss Entertainment Starship Entertainment
