= Pink Romance =

- Pink Romance Single Cover

Single by K.Will, Sistar, and Boyfriend
- Released: November 25, 2011
- Recorded: 2011
- Genre: K-pop, dance, pop
- Length: 3:30
- Label: Starship Entertainment

K.Will, Sistar, and Boyfriend singles chronology
| "Pink Romance" (2011) | "White Love" (2012) |

"Pink Romance" is the first collaboration single of labelmates K.Will, Sistar, and Boyfriend from Starship Entertainment released under the name Starship Planet. Starship Entertainment stated that this project of digital singles is a way of thanking Starship's fans and was created to help those in need. The special digital single was released on November 25, 2011.

== Background and promotion ==
K.Will, Sistar, and Boyfriend collaborated as Starship Planet on a festive music video for the digital single "Pink Romance" in which they expressed their love for each other and their fans. A part of the digital single's sales will be donated to charity.

Starship Entertainment also remarked that their artists have volunteered to contribute to the community.

== Music videos ==
| Year | Song | Length |
|---|---|---|
| 2011 | "Pink Romance" | 3:30 |

=== Collaboration singles ===
| Year | Information | Track listing | Peak Chart Positions | Sales |
| Year | Information | Track listing | (Gaon Chart) | Sales |
|---|---|---|---|---|
| 2011 | Released: November 25, 2011; Format: Digital download; Label: Starship Entertainment | 1. "Pink Romance" | 25 | —N/a |
"—" denotes releases that did not chart or were not released in that region.
