= We Are Boyfriend =

- We Are BOYFRIEND Normal Edition Cover

Compilation album by Boyfriend
- Released: June 6, 2012
- Recorded: 2012
- Genre: J-pop, dance, pop
- Length: 21:05
- Label: Starship Entertainment; Being Group (Japan)

Boyfriend chronology
I'll Be There (2011)	We Are Boyfriend (2012)	Love Style (2012)

Singles from We Are Boyfriend
- 1. "Boyfriend" Released: May 26, 2011; 2. "Don't Touch My Girl" Released: October 5, 2011; 3. "I'll Be There" Released: December 8, 2011

We Are Boyfriend is the first special compilation album by South Korean boy band Boyfriend to be released in Japan. The album consists of their past three Korean singles from 2011. The album was released digitally on June 6, 2012.

== Background and promotion ==
Boyfriend's Japanese agency, Being Group, said they are sure that the group will be successful in the Japanese market with their refined appearance and music. Boyfriend received as much money as other K-pop stars by signing the contract but the exact amount is unknown.

Boyfriend's album We Are Boyfriend also ranked on the same chart, coming in at 6th.

Boyfriend’s agency Starship Entertainment revealed on June 20 that the Japanese version of “We Are Boyfriend” released on June 6 as a prelude to their official Japanese debut had reached number 1 on the Oricon weekly Foreign Music Chart.

We Are Boyfriend is a package of three singles that have been previously released in Korea.

== Track listing ==
No.	Title	Length
1.	"Boyfriend"	3:07
2.	"Don't Touch My Girl"	3:31
3.	"ひとりじゃないふたり (Not One But Two)"	3:36
4.	"It's U"	3:06
5.	"You & I"	3:20
6.	"I'll Be There"	3:17
7.	"Boyfriend: 2012 Remix" (Bonus Track)	3:09
Total length:		23:05

== Charts ==
Chart (2012)	Peak position	Sales
Japan Albums Chart (Oricon)	6	10,702+
