= Glider (song) =

- Type C Album Cover

Single by Boyfriend
- Released: June 1, 2016
- Recorded: 2016
- Genre: J-pop
- Label: Kiss Entertainment; Starship Entertainment

Boyfriend singles chronology
"To My Bestfriend" (2016)	"Glider" (2016)	"Jackpot" (2016)

"Glider" is a Japanese-language song, and the seventh Japanese single, by South Korean boy band Boyfriend from their seventh Japanese single album of the same name. This was their restart single after a short hiatus in the Japanese market and their first single released under Kiss Entertainment. The single was released physically on June 1, 2016.

== Track listing ==
Limited Edition [CD + DVD]
No.	Title	Length
1.	"GLIDER"	4:25
2.	"Party People"	3:22
3.	"名もなきlove song"	4:48
4.	"明日の晴れ渡る空に"	5:10
5.	"GLIDER" (Instrumental)	4:22
6.	"DVD" (PV + PV Making)

Type A
No.	Title	Length
1.	"GLIDER"	4:25
2.	"Party People"	3:22
3.	"GLIDER" (Instrumental)	4:22
4.	"Party People" (Instrumental)	3:20

Type B
No.	Title	Length
1.	"GLIDER"	4:25
2.	"名もなきlove song"	4:48
3.	"GLIDER" (Instrumental)	4:22
4.	"名もなきlove song" (Instrumental)	4:46

Type C
No.	Title	Length
1.	"GLIDER"	4:25
2.	"明日の晴れ渡る空に"	5:10
3.	"GLIDER" (Instrumental)	4:22
4.	"明日の晴れ渡る空に" (Instrumental)	5:08

Individual Member Covers
No.	Title	Length
1.	"GLIDER"	4:25

== Music videos ==
Year	Song	Length	Notes	Official MV on YouTube
2016	"Glider"	4:26	Full PV	Glider on YouTube

== Release history ==
Country	Date	Format	Label
Japan	June 1, 2016	CD; Digital download	Kiss Entertainment Starship Entertainment
