= Startup! =

- Limited Edition Album Cover

Single by Boyfriend
- B-side: "DO-DO-DO"
- Released: May 28, 2014
- Recorded: 2014
- Genre: J-pop, dance
- Label: Being Group; Starship Entertainment

Boyfriend singles chronology
"My Avatar" (2014)	"Startup!" (2014)	"Obsession" (2014)

"Startup!" (Japanese スタートアップ！) is a Japanese-language song, and is the sixth Japanese single by the South Korean boy band Boyfriend from their sixth Japanese single album of the same name. The single was released physically on May 28, 2014.

== Track listing ==
Standard Edition CD
No.	Title	Length
1.	"Startup!"	4:08
2.	"DO-DO-DO"	3:55
3.	"Be my shine ～君を離さない～" (LIVE from Boyfriend Love Communication 2013 -Seventh Mission-)	10:26
4.	"Startup!" (Instrumental)	4:08
5.	"DO-DO-DO" (Instrumental)	3:54

Limited Edition [CD + DVD]
No.	Title	Length
1.	"Startup!"	4:08
2.	"DO-DO-DO"	3:55
3.	"Startup!" (Instrumental)	4:08
4.	"DO-DO-DO" (Instrumental)	3:54
5.	"Startup!" (Music video + Making of)

LAWSON/HMV Limited Edition (2CD)
No.	Title	Length
1.	"Startup!"	4:08
2.	"DO-DO-DO"	3:55
3.	"Startup!" (Instrumental)	4:08
4.	"DO-DO-DO" (Instrumental)	3:54
5.	"Love Community Radio Station" (Disc 2)	49:08

== Music videos ==
Year	Song	Length	Notes	Official MV on YouTube
2014	"Startup!"	4:27	Full PV	Startup! on YouTube
