= White Love (Starship Planet song) =

Single by K.Will, Sistar's Soyou, and Boyfriend's Jeongmin
- Released: November 29, 2012
- Recorded: 2012
- Genre: K-pop, dance, pop
- Length: 3:44
- Label: Starship Entertainment

K.Will, Sistar's Soyou, and Boyfriend's Jeongmin singles chronology
"Pink Romance" (2011)	"White Love" (2012)	"Snow Candy" (2013)

"White Love" is the second collaboration single by labelmates K.Will, Sistar, and Boyfriend, released under the name Starship Planet (Starship Entertainment). This digital single project is a way of thanking the fans who have cheered on Starship. The special digital single was released digitally on November 29, 2012.

== Music video ==
Year	Song	Length	Notes
2012	"White Love" (with K.Will, Sistar's Soyou and Boyfriend's Jeongmin)	3:59	featuring Boyfriend's Jeongmin and Heo Ji-won

=== Collaboration singles ===
Year	Information	Track listing	Peak Chart Positions	Sales
Year	Information	Track listing	(Gaon Chart)	Sales
2012	Released: November 29, 2012; Format: Digital download; Label: Starship Entertainment	1. "White Love"	6	—N/a
"—" denotes releases that did not chart or were not released in that region.
