= Seventh Mission =

- HMV Lawson Edition Album Cover

Studio album by Boyfriend
- Released: May 29, 2013
- Recorded: 2012–2013
- Genre: J-pop, dance-pop
- Length: 1:41:56
- Language: Japanese
- Label: Being Group

Boyfriend chronology
"ON&ON' (2013)	Seventh Mission (2013)	Pinky Santa (2013)

Singles from Seventh Mission
- 1. "Be My Shine" Released: August 22, 2012; 2. "Dance Dance Dance / MY LADY" Released: November 28, 2012; 3. "Melody of Eyes" Released: March 27, 2013

Seventh Mission is the Japanese debut album by the South Korean boy band Boyfriend. It was released on May 29, 2013, in four different editions.

== Background ==
The title of the album "SEVENTH MISSION" represents the six members and the seventh is their fans coming together for one mission, the album. The album, which will include eleven songs, will release in four different versions: Limited Type A, Limited Type B, CD Only, and The Lawson and HMV Versions. Limited Type A is said to include an extra DVD with footage from the guys’ "Nippon Budokan Premium Showcase Live" and a member character charm; Limited Type B will include a 30-minute DVD; the Lawson and HMV versions will have additional content; and the CD Only will include a bonus track.

== Composition ==
The album is composed of eleven songs, four singles, seven new songs and short edit of Korean version Melody of Eyes. The track Melody of Eyes was originally recorded in Japanese and released on their latest Japanese single Melody of Eyes

== Singles ==
Three songs from the album were released as singles:

The first single from the album is original Japanese song, "Be My Shine". It was released on August 22, 2012 as the group's Japanese debut single. It peaked number 4 on Oricon's Weekly chart with around 56,000 copies sold to date.

The second single from the album is another original Japanese song "Dance Dance Dance / MY LADY", with two sided disc songs, Dance Dance Dance and MY LADY. It was released on November 28, 2012. It peaked number 3 in Oricon's Weekly chart with around 37,800 copies sold to date.

The third and final single from the album is original Japanese single "Melody of Eyes". It was released on March 27, 2013. It peaked number 4 in Oricon's Weekly chart with around 34,010 copies sold to date.

== Track listing ==
CD+DVD+GOODS
No.	Title	Lyrics	Music	Length
1.	"CODE NAME; SPY GET LOVE"			3:34
2.	"Be My Shine"	GORO Matsui, Song Soo Yoon	G-High, Han Jae Ho, Lee Joo Hyoung, Kim Seung Soo	3:50
3.	"Dance Dance Dance"	La Terre	K & K Factory	4:10
4.	"First Kiss"	KOMU	Sadahiro Nakano	5:16
5.	"Party Plane"	Akihiko Nakahara	Anders Wigelius, Erik Wigelius	4:08
6.	"Supernatural"	Kei Noguchi, Song Soo Yoon	Hwang Hyun	3:25
7.	"Dangerous"	ma-saya	SHIROSE from WHITE JAM/COACHE	2:16
8.	"My I"	Saki Nishina, G-high, Lee Joo Hyoun	G-high, Lee Joo Hyoung	3:11
9.	"Waikiki"	ma-saya	JP ＆ Lee	3:34
10.	"MY LADY"	Boy-Boy, SONG SOO YOON	HAN JAE HO, KIM SEUNG SOO, G-High, LEE JOO HYOUNG	3:33
11.	"Melody of Eyes"	La Terre	K & K Factory	4:59
12.	"NIPPON BUDOKAN PREMIUM SHOWCASE LIVE" (DVD)			60:00
13.	"Chibi Character" (GOODS)
14.	"Special Box" (GOODS)

CD+DVD
No.	Title	Length
15.	"Special Movie" (Special DVD)	30:00

CD+PHOTOBOOK
No.	Title	Length
16.	"A4 SIZE PHOTOBOOK (48P)" (w/ attache case)

CD only
No.	Title	Length
17.	"Melody of Eyes" (KRN ver. (Short Edit))

== Charts ==
Oricon Chart	Peak	Debut sales
Daily Albums Chart	4	—
Weekly Albums Chart	7	11,811
Monthly Albums Chart	23	11,811
Yearly Albums Chart	439	13,085
