= Pinky Santa =

- HMV Lawson Edition Album Cover

Single by Boyfriend
- B-side: "My Treasure"
- Released: November 20, 2013
- Recorded: 2013
- Genre: J-pop, dance
- Label: Being Group; Starship Entertainment
- Songwriters: Izuru, Kousyun Maemura

Boyfriend singles chronology
"Seventh Mission" (2013)	"Pinky Santa" (2013)	"My Avatar" (2014)

"Pinky Santa" is the fourth Japanese single by South Korean boy band Boyfriend from their 4th Japanese single album of the same name which features Japanese actor and actress Taishi Nakagawa and Aoi Yoshikura as its PV models. This single is an original song and was released physically on November 20, 2013.

== Background and promotion ==
On October 23, 2013, Boyfriend revealed the preview for their Christmas song "Pinky Santa". The single is entitled 'Pinky Santa' which obviously utilizes color pink, but pinky also means the smallest finger which is used when promising. Boyfriend released the single on November 20, 2013 in four different versions: (limited edition B version A with cd, version b with cd and DVD, and normal edition).

== Track listing ==
Normal Edition CD
No.	Title	Length
1.	"Pinky Santa"
2.	"My Treasure"
3.	"Pinky Santa" (Instrumental)
4.	"My Treasure" (Instrumental)

Limited Edition B [CD + DVD]
No.	Title	Length
1.	"Pinky Santa"
2.	"My Treasure"
3.	"Pinky Santa" (Instrumental)
4.	"My Treasure" (Instrumental)
5.	"Pinky Santa" (Music video + making)

Limited Edition A (CD + Goods)
No.	Title	Length
1.	"Pinky Santa"
2.	"My Treasure"
3.	"Pinky Santa" (Instrumental)
4.	"My Treasure" (Instrumental)
5.	"Goods" (Love amulet)

== Music videos ==
Year	Song	Length	Notes	Official MV on YouTube
2013	"Pinky Santa" (1 cho ver.)	1:39		Pinky Santa (1 CHO Ver.)

== Charts ==
=== Oricon ===
Oricon Chart	Peak	Debut sales	Sales Total
Daily Singles Chart	4	—	—
Weekly Singles Chart	5	35,198	—
Monthly Singles Chart	18	35,701	—

=== Other Charts ===
Chart	Peak Position
Billboard Japan Hot 100	9
