= To My Bestfriend =

Single by Boyfriend
- Released: May 26, 2016
- Recorded: 2016
- Genre: K-pop
- Label: Starship Entertainment

Boyfriend singles chronology
"'Boyfriend in Wonderland'" (2015)	"To My Bestfriend" (2016)	"Glider" (2016)

"To My Bestfriend" (Korean: 약속할게) is the second digital single released by South Korean boy band Boyfriend. The single is a special gift to fans for the group's fifth anniversary. It was released May 26, 2016.

== Track listing ==
No.	Title	Length
1.	"약속할게 (To My Bestfriend)"	3:41

== Music videos ==
Year	Song	Length	Notes	Official MV on YouTube
2013	"약속할게 (To My Bestfriend)"	3:42		약속할게 (To My Bestfriend) Teaser; 약속할게 (To My Bestfriend)

== Release history ==
Country	Date	Format	Label
South Korea	May 26, 2016	Digital download	Starship Entertainment LOEN Entertainment
