= Boyfriend in Wonderland =

- Album cover

EP by Boyfriend
- Released: March 9, 2015
- Recorded: 2015
- Genres: K-pop, dance, ballad
- Label: Starship Entertainment

Boyfriend chronology
| Witch (2014) | Boyfriend in Wonderland (2015) | To My Bestfriend (2016) |

Singles from Boyfriend in Wonderland
- 1. "Bounce" Released: March 9, 2015

Boyfriend in Wonderland is the fourth EP by South Korean boy band Boyfriend. It was released physically March 9, 2015.

== Track listing ==
| No. | Title | Length |
|---|---|---|
| 1. | "All In" | 0:59 |
| 2. | "Bounce" | 3:16 |
| 3. | "삐딱이 (Crooked)" | 3:27 |
| 4. | "하나 둘 셋 (1, 2, 3)" | 4:01 |
| 5. | "Lost Memory" | 3:15 |
| 6. | "White Day" | 2:59 |
