= Kimi to Dance Dance Dance / My Lady (Fuyu no Koibito) =

- Digital and regular edition cover

Single by Boyfriend

from the album Kimi to Dance Dance Dance/MY LADY -Fuyu no Koibito-
- Released: November 28, 2012
- Recorded: 2012
- Genre: J-pop, dance
- Length: 15:50
- Label: Being Group; Starship Entertainment
- Producer: Daiko Nagato

Boyfriend Japanese singles chronology
"Janus" (2012)	"Kimi to Dance Dance Dance / My Lady (Fuyu no Koibito)" (2012)	"I Yah" (2013)

"Kimi to Dance Dance Dance / My Lady (Fuyu no Koibito)" is the second Japanese single by South Korean boy band Boyfriend. This single is another original song and was released digitally on November 28, 2012.

== Videography ==
Year	Song	Length	Notes	Official MV on YouTube
2012	"Dance Dance Dance"	1:41		Dance Dance Dance (Short Ver.)
2012	"My Lady"	1:32		My Lady (Short Ver.)
2012	"Dance Dance Dance"	4:43	Full PV	Dance Dance Dance
2012	"My Lady"	3:48	Full PV	My Lady

== Track listing ==
Limited Edition(A) [CD + DVD]
No.	Title	Length
1.	"キミとDance Dance Dance / Kimi to Dance Dance Dance ～"	4:10
2.	"MY LADY ～冬の恋人～ / MY LADY～Fuyu no Koibito"	3:45
3.	"キミとDance Dance Dance / Kimi to Dance Dance Dance (Instrumental)"	4:10
4.	"Bonus DVD: キミとDance Dance Dance / Kimi to Dance Dance Dance MUSIC VIDEO + The Making"

Limited Edition(B) [CD + DVD]
No.	Title	Length
1.	"MY LADY ～冬の恋人～ / MY LADY～Fuyu no Koibito～" (DVD)	3:45
2.	"キミとDance Dance Dance / Kimi to Dance Dance Dance"	4:10
3.	"MY LADY ～冬の恋人～ / MY LADY～Fuyu no Koibito～ (Instrumental)"	3:45
4.	"Bonus DVD: MY LADY ～冬の恋人～ / MY LADY～Fuyu no Koibito～ MUSIC VIDEO + The Making"

Regular Edition CD
No.	Title	Length
1.	"キミとDance Dance Dance / Kimi to Dance Dance Dance"	4:10
2.	"MY LADY ～冬の恋人～ / MY LADY～Fuyu no Koibito～" (DVD)	3:45
3.	"キミとDance Dance Dance / Kimi to Dance Dance Dance (Instrumental)"	4:10
4.	"MY LADY ～冬の恋人～ / MY LADY～Fuyu no Koibito～ (Instrumental)"	3:45
Total length:		15:50

Limited HMV version [CD + Photobook]
No.	Title	Length
1.	"MY LADY ～冬の恋人～ / MY LADY～Fuyu no Koibito～" (DVD)	3:45
2.	"キミとDance Dance Dance / Kimi to Dance Dance Dance"	4:10
3.	"MY LADY ～冬の恋人～ / MY LADY～Fuyu no Koibito～ (Instrumental)"	3:45
4.	"キミとDance Dance Dance / Kimi to Dance Dance Dance (Instrumental)"	4:10
Total length:		15:50

== Charts ==
=== Oricon ===
Oricon Chart	Peak	Debut Sales	Sales Total	Chart Run
Daily Singles Chart	2	28,239	38,738+	2 weeks
Weekly Singles Chart	3	37,800	38,738+	2 weeks
Monthly Singles Chart	15	37,800	38,738+	2 weeks
Yearly Singles Chart	—	40,170	38,738+	2 weeks

=== Other Charts ===
Chart	Peak Position
Billboard Japan Hot 100	8
Billboard Japan Hot Singles sales	3
