= Obsession (Boyfriend EP) =

- Album cover

EP by Boyfriend
- Released: June 9, 2014
- Recorded: 2014
- Genre: K-pop, dance, ballad
- Label: Starship Entertainment

Boyfriend chronology
Startup! (2014)	Obsession (2014)	Seventh Color (2014)

Singles from Obsession
- 1. "Obsession" Released: June 9, 2014; 2. "Alarm" Released: June 9, 2014

Obsession is the second mini-album by South Korean boy band Boyfriend. It was released physically June 9, 2014.

== Background and promotion ==
In the beginning of May, members Hyunseong, Jeongmin, and Youngmin posted selcas on Twitter with captions hinting to an upcoming comeback. On May 19, 2014, Starship Entertainment uploaded a 30-second trailer to YouTube announcing Boyfriend's next comeback happening in June.

Starting on May 25, 2014, the members opened up their own personal Twitter accounts one by one. Each member tweeted their own teaser images showing the concept for their next comeback. A few days later, a music video trailer was revealed and showed the boys’ new mature image. It also showed that Boyfriend were no longer boys and transformed into men, with member Hyunseong going shirtless and showing his impressive abs.

On June 5, 2014, the music video was uploaded on 1theK's YouTube channel. That same day, Boyfriend had their official comeback performance on Mnet's M!Countdown.

Boyfriend had their album showcase on June 9, 2014 at AX-KOREA. Along with the showcase, the long-awaited album was finally released that same day.

== Track listing ==
No.	Title	Length
1.	"Back it up"	1:10
2.	"Obsession (너란 여자)"	3:14
3.	"Alarm"	3:12
4.	"Deny"	3:06
5.	"10 Minutes Ago (10분전)"	3:23
6.	"Hey Fox (여우야)"	3:20

== Music videos ==
Year	Song	Length	Notes	Official MV on YouTube
2014	"Obsession"	3:30	Official MV	Obsession on YouTube
2014	"Alarm"	3:17	Official MV	Alarm on YouTube

== Charts ==
=== Album chart ===
Chart	Peak position
South Korea (Hanteo Weekly Album Chart)	5
South Korea (Gaon Weekly Album Chart)	4
South Korea (Gaon Monthly Album Chart)	7

=== Sales ===
Chart	Sales
Gaon physical sales	25, 640+ (South Korea)
