= Summer (Boyfriend EP) =

- Limited Edition Type A Cover

EP by Boyfriend
- Released: July 12, 2017
- Recorded: 2017
- Genre: J-pop
- Label: Kiss Entertainment; Starship Entertainment

Boyfriend chronology
Boyfriend Love Communication 2012～2014 -Perfect Best Collection- (2015)	Summer (2017)	Never End (2017)

Singles from Summer
- 1. "Summer" Released: July 12, 2017

Summer is the first Japanese EP from South Korean boy band Boyfriend. It was released physically and digitally July 12, 2017.

== Background and promotion ==
On May 22, 2017, Kiss Entertainment announced through Twitter that the group would be making a return to the Japanese market by releasing their first Japanese EP. It was later confirmed that the EP would be released in two different limited editions along with six different standard editions with individual member covers.

== Track listing ==
Limited Edition Type A & B [CD + DVD]
No.	Title	Length
1.	"Summer"	4:09
2.	"Nobody Knows"	4:03
3.	"Remember"	4:28
4.	"Tell U Dat"	3:48
5.	"真夏の夜の夢"	3:58
6.	"Believe" (Special Track)	4:28
7.	"Summer" (Instrumental)	4:07
8.	"DVD" (PV + PV Making)

Individual Member Covers
No.	Title	Length
1.	"Summer"	4:09
2.	"Nobody Knows"	4:03
3.	"Remember"	4:28
4.	"Tell U Dat"	3:48
5.	"真夏の夜の夢"	3:58
6.	"Summer" (Instrumental)	4:07

== Music videos ==
Year	Song	Length	Notes	Official MV on YouTube
2017	"Summer"	4:06	Full PV	Summer on YouTube

== Release history ==
Country	Date	Format	Label
Japan	July 12, 2017	CD; Digital download	Kiss Entertainment Starship Entertainment
