= Janus (album) =

Studio album by Boyfriend
- Released: KOR November 8, 2012
- Recorded: 2012
- Genre: K-pop, dance-pop
- Length: 36:41
- Language: Korean
- Label: Starship Entertainment
- Producer: Sweetune

Boyfriend chronology
Be My Shine (2012)	Janus (2012)	Dance Dance Dance / MY LADY (2012)

Singles from Janus
- 1. "Janus" Released: November 8, 2012; 2. "I Yah" Released: January 10, 2013

Alternative Cover
- I Yah album cover

Janus is the first studio album released by Boyfriend. The album was released physically on November 8 and online on November 13, 2012 by Starship Entertainment and their distributing label LOEN Entertainment.

== Music videos ==
The music video for "Janus" was released on November 8, 2012. Their second music video was "I Yah" alongside child actress Kim So-hyun, was released on January 10, 2013

== Commercial performance ==
Janus debuted at number two on the Gaon Album Chart in South Korea for the week of November 11, 2012. As of January 2013, the album has sold 32,205 copies in South Korea and 2,853 in Japan. Its reissue, I Yah, has sold 24,675 copies in South Korea and 3,670 in Japan as of 2013.

== Track listing ==
No.	Title	Lyrics	Music	Length
1.	"야누스 (JANUS)"	Song Soo Yoon	Han Jae-Ho, Kim Seung Soo, An Jun Seong	3:31
2.	"내 꿈꿔 (Good Night)"	Song Soo Yoon	G-High, Lee Joo-Hyoung	3:45
3.	"Excuse Me"	Song Soo Yoon	Go NamSu, Han BoRam	3:11
4.	"이랬다 저랬다 (Trippin')" (Hyun Seong solo)	G-High, Lee Joo-Hyoung	G-High, Lee Joo-Hyoung	3:09
5.	"미스터리 (Mystery)"	Song Soo Yoon	E.One	3:27
6.	"Go Back"	Song Soo Yoon	Han Jae-Ho, Kim Seung Soo, An Jun Seong	3:13
7.	"Stop It"	Song Soo Yoon	Jeong ChangUg, Ham SeungHyo	3:09
8.	"Listen" (Dong Hyun solo)	Song Soo Yoon	Lee Chang Hyeon	3:34
9.	"잘 지내니 (My Dear)" (Jeong Min solo)	Song Soo Yoon	Hwang Hyeon	3:30
10.	"열쇠 (Soulmate)"	Song Soo Yoon	DK	3:12
Total length:				36:41

Repackaged Edition (CD)
No.	Title	Lyrics	Music	Length
1.	"아이야 (I yah)"	Song Soo Yoon	Han Jae-Ho, Kim Seung Soo	3:17
2.	"야누스 (JANUS)"			3:31
3.	"그 곳에 (Standing with U)"	Song Soo Yoon	Han Jae-Ho, Kim Seung Soo, YUE	3:22
4.	"내 꿈꿔 (Good Night)"			3:45
5.	"Excuse Me"			3:11
6.	"이랬다 저랬다 (Trippin') [Hyun Seong solo]"			3:09
7.	"미스터리 (MYSTERY)"			3:27
8.	"Go Back"			3:13
9.	"Stop It"			3:09
10.	"Listen [Dong Hyun solo]"			3:34
11.	"잘 지내니 (My Dear) [Jeong Min solo]"			3:30
12.	"열쇠 (Soulmate)"			3:12
Total length:				43:20

== Charts ==
=== Weekly charts ===
Chart (2012)	Peak position
South Korean Albums (Gaon)	2

==== I Yah ====
Chart (2013)	Peak position
South Korean Albums (Gaon)	5

=== Monthly charts ===
Chart (2012)	Peak position
South Korean Albums (Gaon)	5

==== I Yah ====
Chart (2012)	Peak position
South Korean Albums (Gaon)	5

== Release history ==
Album	Country	Date	Format	Label
Janus	South Korea	November 8, 2012	Digital download	Starship Entertainment LOEN Entertainment
Janus	South Korea	November 13, 2012	CD	Starship Entertainment LOEN Entertainment
I Yah	South Korea	January 10, 2013	Digital download	Starship Entertainment LOEN Entertainment
I Yah	South Korea	January 16, 2013	CD	Starship Entertainment LOEN Entertainment
