= Witch (Boyfriend EP) =

- Album cover

EP by Boyfriend
- Released: October 13, 2014
- Recorded: 2014
- Genre: K-pop, dance, ballad
- Label: Starship Entertainment
- Producer: Sweettune

Boyfriend chronology
Seventh Color (2014)	Witch (2014)	Boyfriend in Wonderland (2015)

Singles from Witch
- 1. "On & On" Released: May 28, 2013; 2. "Witch" Released: October 13, 2014; 3. "White Out" Released: October 13, 2014

Witch is the third EP by South Korean boy band Boyfriend. It was released physically October 13, 2014.

== Background and promotion ==
On May 27, 2013, Starship Entertainment revealed Boyfriend would release a digital single, "On & On", the next day. On May 28, the single was released and its music video uploaded to Starship's official YouTube channel,

On September 26, 2014, Starship Entertainment released the track list for Boyfriend's third EP. No other details, such as the concept or title track, were confirmed by Starship Entertainment. The album name and release date were revealed October 1, and on October 13, Starship Entertainment posted the music video teaser for another single, "White Out".

Boyfriend debuted the EP's songs on Mnet's M!Countdown on October 9. On October 13, physical copies of the EP Witch were released. The official music video for the EP's title track, "Witch", was also released that same day.

== Track listing ==
No.	Title	Lyrics	Music	Length
1.	"Bewitch"	Yella Diamond, No Minwoo, Jo Kwangmin	An Joon-seong	1:15
2.	"Witch"	Song Soo-yoon, Min Yeon-jae	Han Jae-ho, Kim Seung-soo, Go Nam-soo	3:49
3.	"White Out"	Song Soo-yoon, Min Yeon-jae	Lee Chang-hyeon, Han Jae-ho, Kim Seung-soo	4:13
4.	"On & On"	Song Soo-yoon	An Jae-ho, Kim Seung-soo	3:13
5.	"친구라도 돼줘" (Just Friends)	Song Soo-yoon, Min Yeon-jae	An Joon-seong, An Jae-ho, Kim Seung-soo	3:35
6.	"Suggest"	Song Soo-yoon, No Minwoo, Jo Kwangmin	Lee Chang-hyeon	3:40
7.	"지내더라" (You've Moved On)	Kim Dong-hyun, Lee Jeong-min, LeL	Kim Dong-hyun, Lee Jeong-min, LeL	4:07

== Release history ==
Country	Date	Format	Label
South Korea	May 28, 2013	Digital download	Starship Entertainment LOEN Entertainment
