= Boyfriend (band) =

South Korean boy group

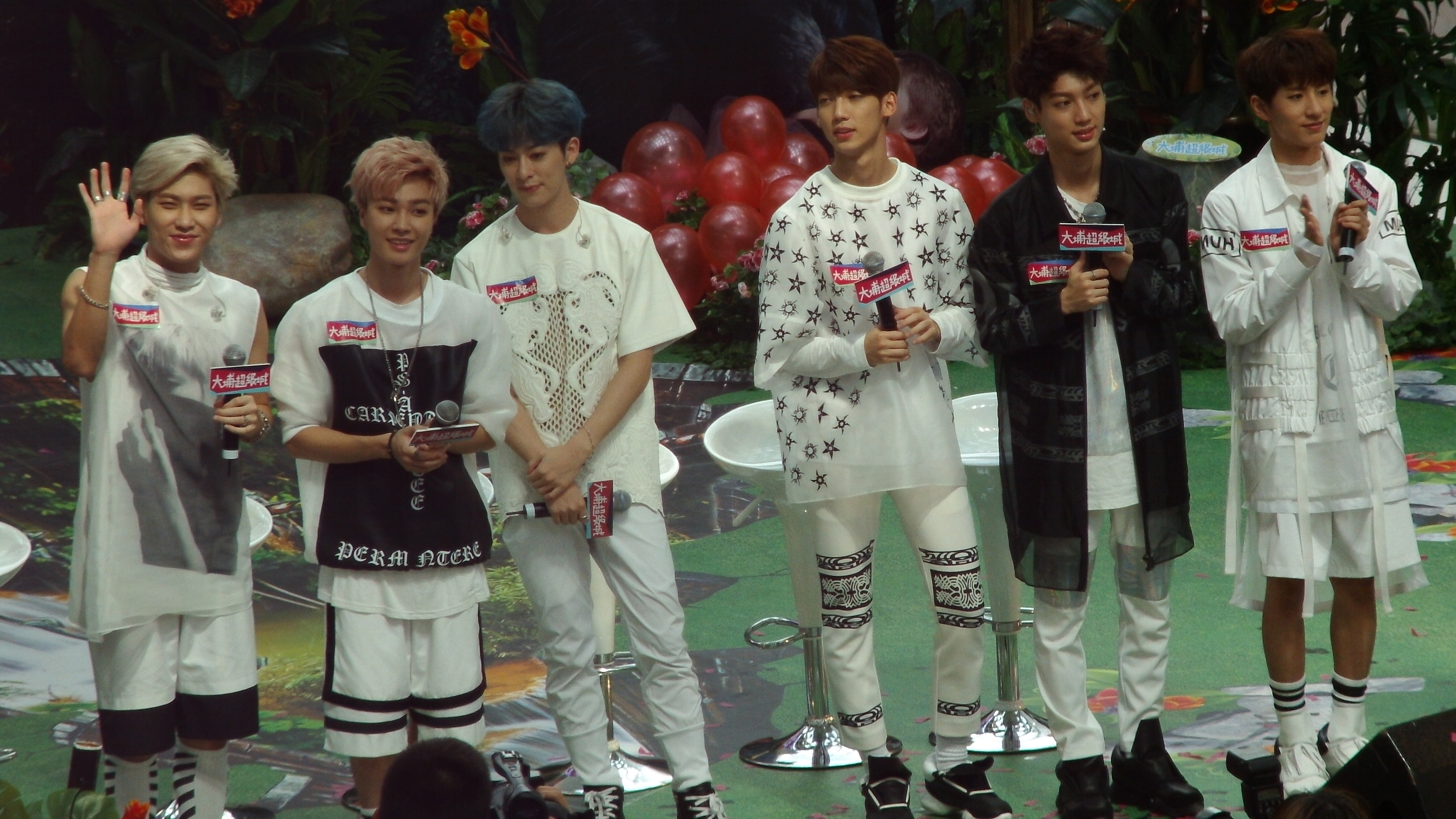
- Boyfriend in Hong Kong, 2014; From left to right: Hyunseong, Jeongmin, Donghyun, Youngmin, Kwangmin, Minwoo

Background information
- Also known as: BF
- Origin: Seoul, South Korea
- Genres: K-pop
- Years active: 2011–2019; 2021–present
- Labels: Starship; WESTTIME; Being Group (Japan); Kiss (Japan); JSL Japan (Japan); Cross Phase Inc.
- Members: Donghyun; Hyunseong; Jeongmin; Youngmin; Kwangmin; Minwoo
- Website: starship-ent.com/profile/musician/boyfriend.php

Boyfriend (Korean: 보이프렌드) is a South Korean boy band formed by Starship Entertainment in 2011. They are the first boy group to have twin members. The group consists of Kim Dong-hyun, Shim Hyun-seong, Lee Jeong-min, Jo Young-min, Jo Kwang-min and No Min-woo. They debuted on Mnet's M Countdown on May 26, 2011, with "Boyfriend".

On May 17, 2019, Starship Entertainment announced that Boyfriend disbanded. They reformed on April 30, 2021, and returned with the digital single "Ending Credit" on May 26 for their 10-year anniversary. On December 29, 2021, Boyfriend made a comeback under the new name "BF" and released the EP Adonis. BF celebrated their 11th year anniversary by releasing a fan song "Canvas" on May 26, 2022. On April 23, 2026, Boyfriend confirmed their long-awaited comeback after five years and will release their 6th mini album titled Boyager 6 on May 26 to celebrate their 15th debut anniversary.

== History ==
=== Pre-debut ===
Youngmin and Kwangmin trained under JYP Entertainment for two years. By their 100th day mark of being child actors, the twins had appeared in over 300 commercials. During his high school years, Donghyun starred in a variety show Conduct Zero where six rebellious high school students were made into exemplary students.

=== 2011: Debut ===
On May 26, 2011, Starship Entertainment released their debut single "Boyfriend". In response to fans concerned that the group had limited its appeal in mid-July, Boyfriend changed their choreography for their single "Boyfriend" when appearing on music shows after rehearsing for two days. After ending their promotions for "Boyfriend", the group followed-up with the song "You & I", which received a more positive response from music critics.

On October 6, Boyfriend's second single, "Don't Touch My Girl", was released. Their December 2011 single "I'll Be There" peaked at #2 on the Gaon music charts.

=== 2012: Love Style, Japanese debut and Janus ===
The group signed a contract with Japanese management agency 'Being', their first Japanese special album entitled "We Are Boyfriend" was released on June 6. They marked their debut with a 10,000 seat showcase on June 30 at the Nippon Budokan. On May 2, Hyunseong released a solo song, "Only You", for the original soundtrack (OST) of The King 2 Hearts.

Their debut Japanese single song is called "Be my Shine". On June 7, Boyfriend released their first mini album "Love Style" on 14 June 2012. On July 1, Boyfriend successfully completed their debut Japanese showcase 'First Date with Boyfriend in Japan' at the Nippon Budokan.

Aside from their domestic comeback, Boyfriend released the short music videos for their second Japanese 'double single' "Dance Dance Dance" and "My Lady". Their first full-length album Janus was released in November 2012.

In December 3, Boyfriend released the music videos for their Japanese 'double single' "Dance Dance Dance" and "My Lady". The boys held a high touch event in celebration of their second single album, 'Kimi to Dance Dance Dance/My Lady', on December 1 and 2 at the Kobe World Hall and the Saitama Super Arena. Boyfriend performed for their 1st solo Japanese concert entitled "Love Communication 2012 ~Xmas Bell~". They held 5 concerts at the Tokyo Dome City Hall from December 22 to 24 with a total of 12,500 fans in all. KBS Joy released a video teaser for Boyfriend's Hello Baby season 7 released on December 27. The members started shooting for the reality series this December, and the first broadcast was released on January 4, 2013, at 11 pm KST.

=== 2013: I Yah, On & On, Melody of Eyes, Seventh Mission and Pinky Santa ===
Boyfriend will become the first foreign artist to sing for the anime. Their song, "Hitomi no Melody", is the title song of their 3rd Japanese single album, which was released on March 27. The song was picked up as the ending theme song for ‘Detective Conan’, and as such, there was a ‘Detective Conan’ album version in addition to the regular album versions. Melody of Eyes made it to the top 5 for 6 days and their highest ranking was 2nd place on Oricon.

On 23 May, Starship Entertainment announced that Boyfriend would be making a comeback with a new digital single entitled "On & On" on 28 May as a surprise gift for celebrating the group's second anniversary in music industry. Starship Entertainment released a music video teaser on May 27 and on the next day they released the official music video. On May 30, Boyfriend's Donghyun has been cast to play the lead male role in musical "Thousandth Man." The musical was presented at Shibuya AiiA Theater Tokyo starting from 28 September 2013. On 14 June, Jeongmin was rushed to a hospital after their schedule in Japan, and was diagnosed with acute appendicitis and ordered to rest for 17 days after being discharged. Boyfriend continued to promote as five members and followed their schedule during this period. Boyfriend released a special Christmas premium single in Japan on November 20 this year. The single is entitled 'Pinky Santa' which obviously utilizes color pink, but pinky also means the smallest finger which is used when promising. Pinky Santa landed on the Weekly Single Chart which rose to number 5 in Oricon.

=== 2014: Obsession, Witch and Bewitch concert ===
Boyfriend successfully wrapped up their solo concert in Puerto Rico, becoming the first-ever K-pop group to do so. On March 8, the group performed in front of 1,700 fans at the 'Centro De Bellas Artes Luis A Ferre'. Boyfriend also performed in the United States for the first time, performing in Chicago on March 11 and Dallas on March 13.

On March 26, 2014, Boyfriend released their fourth Japanese Single "My Avatar" together with a music video.

On May 15, 2014, they posted selfies whilst shooting for their music video, hinting at a new release that year. On May 21, 2014, a short trailer was posted on their official YouTube channel. Boyfriend's second Korean EP, Obsession, was released on June 4. The EP contains new six tracks, with the lead single "Obsession".

On July 23, Boyfriend's second Japanese album, Seventh Color was released. The album also released in three versions.

On October 9, Boyfriend began their comeback stage with their new track, "Witch" on M Countdown. Their third Korean EP, Witch, was released on October 13. The EP contains six tracks, including their second anniversary single "On & On" previously released in 2013. They held their first domestic concert, The First Chapter in Seoul "Bewitch" on 23 November 2014 at Olympic Hall, Olympic Park.

=== 2015–2016: Boyfriend in Wonderland, First world tour, and Japanese promotions ===
In March 2015, Boyfriend released their fourth Korean extended play, Boyfriend in Wonderland, with "Bounce" serving as the lead single. In the following month, they began their first world tour, "The First Chapter: "Bewitch" starting in Taiwan and following into Brazil, Argentina, Bolivia, Mexico, Finland, Russia, and France.

In May 2016, Boyfriend released their eleventh Korean digital single, "To My Bestfriend" to celebrate their fifth anniversary since their debut as a group. In November, they released their eighth Japanese single, "Jackpot". This single marked as their second single released under Kiss Entertainment in the Japanese music industry.

=== 2017–2019: Summer, Never End, and disbandment ===
Boyfriend released their ninth Japanese single, "I Miss You", in February 2017. Five months later, they released their first Japanese extended play, Summer, with "Summer" as the lead single. Two years after releasing their fourth Korean extended play, Boyfriend released their fifth EP, Never End with title track "Star", in August 2017.

Four Boyfriend members, Jeongmin, Donghyun, Kwangmin and Minwoo, auditioned for the KBS idol-rebooting show The Unit, with only Donghyun passing the audition. While ranking in the top nine for most of the show, he was eliminated in the last episode with a final ranking of 12.

On May 25, 2018, Boyfriend released "Sunshower", a special song to commemorate the group's seventh anniversary. Jeongmin helped composed the track, and its lyrics were written by him, Donghyun, Kwangmin, and Minwoo.

With teaser images released by Donghyun, it was confirmed that Boyfriend would have a Japanese comeback on February 27, 2019.

Boyfriend disbanded on May 17, 2019.

=== 2021: 10th anniversary and reunion ===
To commemorate their 10th anniversary, Boyfriend decided to reunite and released the digital single "Ending Credit" on May 26, 2021.

On December 29, Boyfriend made a comeback under the new name "BF" and released the EP Adonis.

=== 2026–present: 15th anniversary and Boyager 6 ===
On April 23, 2026, Boyfriend confirmed their comeback after approximately five years and will release their 6th mini album Boyager 6 on May 26 to celebrate their 15th debut anniversary.On April 27, Boyfriend announced they will hold a fan concert titled '2026 Boyfriend Fan Concert: Our 15th Season' at Gabin Art Hall on May 30 to welcome their 15th season together with their fans.

== Discography ==
- Janus (2012)
- Seventh Mission (2013)
- Seventh Color (2014)
- Bouquet (2019)

== Members ==
- Donghyun (동현)
- Hyunseong (현성)
- Jeongmin (정민)
- Youngmin (영민)
- Kwangmin (광민)
- Minwoo (민우)

== Awards and nominations ==
Year presented, name of the award ceremony, award category, recipient of the award and the result of the nomination
Year	Program	Category	Recipient	Result	Ref.
2011	13th Mnet Asian Music Awards	Best New Male Artist	Boyfriend	Nominated	
2011	SBS MTV Best of the Best	Hot Debut Star	Boyfriend	Nominated	
2011	SBS MTV Best of the Best	Best New Artist	Boyfriend	Won	
2011	26th Golden Disc Awards	Best New Artist	Boyfriend	Won	
2011	21st Seoul Music Awards	Best Newcomer Award	Boyfriend	Won	
2013	27th Japan Gold Disc Awards	Best 3 New Artists (Asia)	Boyfriend	Won	
2013	Korean Entertainment 10th Anniversary Award in Japan	Special Jury Prize	Boyfriend	Won	
2013	2013 MTV EMA	Best Korea Act	Boyfriend	Nominated	
2013	Billboard Japan Music 2013 Awards	Animation Artist of the Year	Boyfriend	Nominated	
2015	2015 Asia Model Awards	Popularity Singer	Boyfriend	Won	
2015	2015 3rd YinYueTai V-Chart Awards	Korean Artist with the Most Potential	Boyfriend	Won	
2016	2016 MTV Asia Music Stage	Trending Male Group	Boyfriend	Won	
