= WJMK =

WJMK may refer to:

- WJMK (AM), a radio station (1250 AM) licensed to serve Bridgeport, Michigan, United States
- WSCR-FM, a radio station (104.3 FM) licensed to serve Chicago, Illinois, United States, which held the call sign WJMK from 1984 to 2017
- WZRL, a radio station (98.3 FM) licensed to serve Plainfield, Indiana, United States, which held the call sign WJMK from 1964 to 1974
- WJMK (group), a K-pop group
