= Kwon Hyun-bin =

South Korean actor (born 1997)

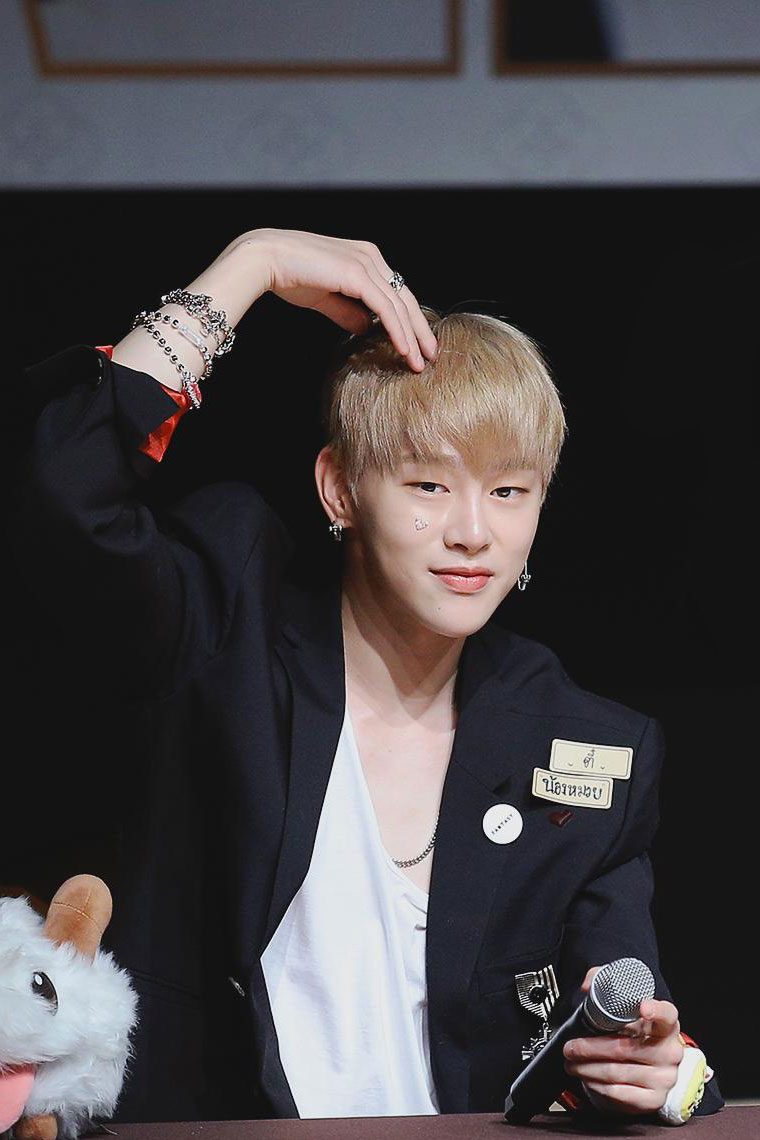
- Kwon in October 2017
- Born: March 4, 1997 (age 29); Seoul, South Korea
- Occupations: Rapper; model; actor
- Years active: 2015–present
- Agent: Ghost Studio
- Musical career
- Genres: K-pop; hip hop
- Instrument: Vocals
- Years active: 2017–2021
- Label: YGX
- Formerly of: JBJ

Korean name
- Hangul: 권현빈
- Hanja: 權炫鑌
- RR: Gwon Hyeonbin
- MR: Kwŏn Hyŏnbin

Kwon Hyun-bin (Korean: 권현빈; born March 4, 1997), also known by his stage name Viini, is a South Korean actor, rapper and model. He is known for his appearance in the second installation of Produce 101 and debuting in the former boy band, JBJ.

== Life and career ==
=== 1997–2016: Early life and career beginnings ===
Kwon Hyun-bin was born on March 4, 1997, in Seoul, South Korea. Briefly residing in Tokyo, Japan for studies, he joined the baseball team in Aoba-Japan International School, and soon returned to South Korea, enrolling in Jungkyung High School as an athlete specializing in fencing; serving as a representative at the teens' fencing tournament. Kwon eventually sustained an injury, resulting in his withdraw from the sport.

In 2015, Kwon began his modelling career under YG KPlus, the youngest addition. He appeared on a variety of pictorials, including the May issue of GQ Korea.

=== 2017–present: Rising popularity, solo debut and acting ===
In April 2017, Kwon appeared on the second installment of Mnet survival program Produce 101. He finished by overall placing 22nd and soon was offered to join project boy group JBJ, consisting of contestants chosen by the viewers. In October 2017, JBJ debuted with their first extended play Fantasy. After seven months, the group's contract came to an end in April 2018. In midst of promotions with JBJ, Kwon appeared on JTBC reality program Live a Good Life alongside labelmates WINNER's Kim Jin-woo and Yoo Byung-jae. Following disbandment, Kwon became a fixed cast member of MBC variety program Dunia: Into a New World.

On February 1, 2019, Kwon joined as a cast member on JTBC's reality show Try It alongside labelmate Yoo Byung-jae. On May 31, Kwon was revealed to be gearing up for a solo debut through YG Entertainment's subsidiary label YGX, followed news of the launch of YouTube channel Kwon Hyunbin Begins where footage of his album preparation, his daily life, and more would be revealed. Kwon made his solo debut on August 19, 2019, with self-composed lead single "Genie" under the stage name Viini. He began promotions with first music show appearance at MBC Show! Music Core on August 24.

In March 2024, Kwon signed with new agency Ghost Studio.

== Endorsement ==
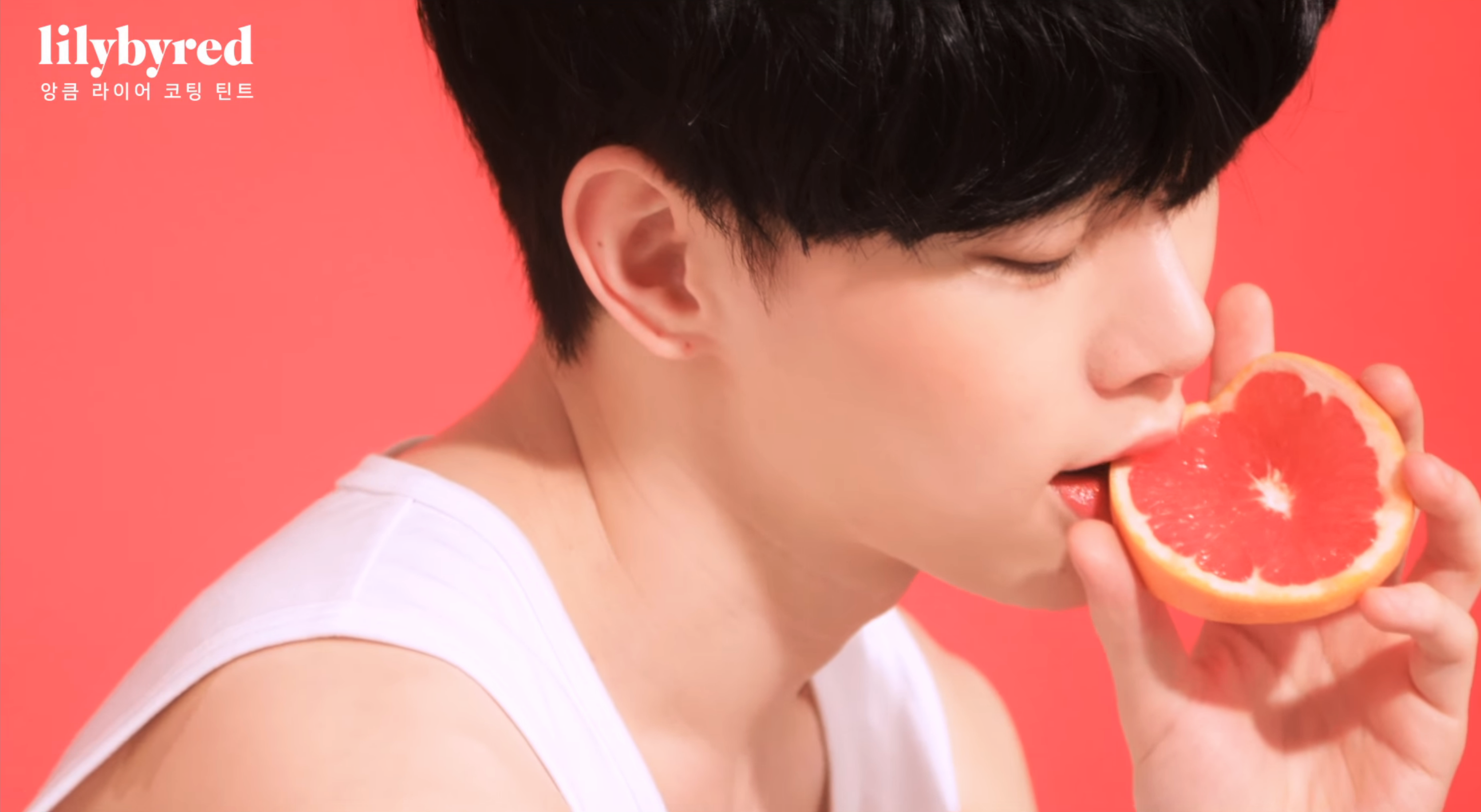
Kwon for Lilybyred in 2017

South Korean cosmetics brand LiliByRed selected Kwon as an exclusive model on July 20, 2017. A representative from the brand revealed: "Hyun-bin is perfectly compatible with the image of the new product, which is known through Kwon Hyun-bin's lustful lips and refreshing charm." The following year, he was joined by Gugudan's Mina as a modelling partner to increase synergy and strengthen the brand image. On September 15, 2018, he attended a fan meeting held by the cosmetics brand as promotion for the lip products.

== Impact and influence ==
Kwon was awarded with "Account With Most Growth" in South Korea through Instagram in 2017. The significant rise of followers within the year interpreted his impact on the mass public.

== Discography ==
=== Extended plays ===
Title	Details	Peak positions	Sales
Title	Details	KOR	Sales
Dimension	Released: August 19, 2019; Label: YGX; Formats: CD, digital download	7	KOR: 7,254

=== Singles ===
Title	Year	Peak position	Album
Title	Year	KOR	Album
"Genie" (도깨비방망이)	2019	—	Dimension
"Love the Moon" (달을 사랑해) (featuring Su-hyun & Bloo)	2020	—	Moon & Butterfly
"—" denotes releases that did not chart or were not released in that region.

=== Soundtrack appearances ===
Year	Title	Album	Ref.
2019	"You Know I Love You" (알면서 또 그래)	Yeonnom OST Part 3	
2020	"Friends" (너의 편)	Girl's World OST Part 4	
2021	"Venus" Moon Jong-up featuring Kwon Hyun-bin	Mr. Queen OST Part 9	
2021	"Letter" (True Beauty X Viini)	True Beauty Webtoon OST	

=== Production credits ===
All song credits are adapted from the Korea Music Copyright Association's database, unless otherwise noted.

Year	Artist	Song	Album	Lyrics	Music
2017	JBJ	"Fantasy" (맞지?)	Fantasy	Yes	No
2018	JBJ	"True Colors"	True Colors	Yes	No
2018	JBJ	"On My Mind" (어질어질)	True Colors	Yes	No
2018	JBJ	"My Flower" (꽃이야)	True Colors	Yes	No
2018	JBJ	"Moonlight"	True Colors	Yes	No
2018	JBJ	"Wonderful Day"	True Colors	Yes	No
2018	JBJ	"Everyday" (매일)	True Colors	Yes	No
2018	JBJ	"Everyday" (매일) [Love Ver]	True Colors	Yes	No
2019	Viini	"Bittersweet" (짠해)	Dimension	Yes	Yes
2019	Viini	"Genie" (도깨비방망이)	Dimension	Yes	Yes
2019	Viini	"Bad" (나쁜말)	Dimension	Yes	Yes
2019	Viini	"Affection" (애틋해)	Dimension	Yes	Yes
2020	Viini	"Love the Moon" (달을 사랑해)	Moon & Butterfly	Yes	Yes
2020	Viini	"Butterfly"	Moon & Butterfly	Yes	Yes

== Videography ==
=== Music videos ===
Year	Title	Director(s)	Length	Ref.
2019	"Genie" (도깨비방망이)	Unknown	3:42	
2020	"Love the Moon" (달을 사랑해) (featuring Su-hyun & Bloo)	Unknown	4:07	

== Filmography ==
=== Film ===
Year	Title		Role	Ref.
Year	English	Korean	Role	Ref.
2021	Twenty Hacker	트웬티 해커	Park Jae-min (Hex)	
2024	4:44 Seconds	4분44초	Lee Dong-min	

=== Television series ===
Year	Title		Role	Ref.
Year	English	Korean	Role	Ref.
2017	Borg Mom	보그맘	Hyung-sik	
2021	The Red Sleeve	옷소매 붉은 끝동	Jeong Baek-ik	
2023	Pandora: Beneath the Paradise	판도라: 조작된 낙원	Cha Pil-seung / Mun Ha-jun / No.105	

=== Web series ===
Year	Title		Role	Ref.
Year	English	Korean	Role	Ref.
2017	Temporary Idols	비정규직 아이돌	Kwon Hyun-bin	
2020	The World of My 17	소녀의 세계	Jung Woo-kyung	
2020	Hanging On	놓지마 정신줄	Ki Young-sang-do	
2020	Café Kilimanjaro	Café 킬리만자로	San-ha	
2021	Summer Guys	썸머가이즈	Park Kwang-bok	
2021–2022	The World of My 17 2	소녀의 세계2	Jung Woo-kyung	
2024	Love Andante	사랑의 안단테	Im Joo-hyung	

=== Television shows ===
Year	Title		Role	Notes	Ref.
Year	English	Korean	Role	Notes	Ref.
2017	Produce 101 Season 2	프로듀스 101 시즌 2	Contestant	Finished in 22nd	
2017	Travel Report	떠나보고서	Cast Member		
2018	Live a Nice Life	착하게 살자	Cast Member		
2018	Dunia: Into a New World	두니아: 처음 만난 세계	Cast Member	Season 1	
2019	Try It	해볼라고	Cast Member	Episodes 3–6	
2019	King of Mask Singer	복면가왕	Contestant (My Father-in-law)	Episode 219	

=== Web shows ===
Year	Title		Role	Notes	Ref.
Year	English	Korean	Role	Notes	Ref.
2019	Kwon Hyun-bin Begins	권현빈 비긴즈	Himself	Documentary series	
2020	Door-to-Door Salesman	방문판매단	Cast Member	with Su-won and Seung-hoon	

=== Music video appearances ===
Year	Title	Artist	Length	Ref.
2017	"I've Got A Feeling" (느낌이 와)	S.I.S	3:22	

== Fan meeting ==
Date	Title	City	Country	Venue	Ref.
July 21, 2017	Clear:Day	Seoul	(South Korea)	—N/a	
August 17, 2018	1st Solo Fanmeeting	Tokyo	(Japan)	Setagaya Town Hall	
September 22, 2018	One Step Closer	Bangkok	(Thailand)	Thunder Dome	
