= The First Snow =

2013 song by Exo

Song by Exo

from the EP Miracles in December
- Released: December 9, 2013
- Recorded: 2013
- Studio: SM Blue Cup (Seoul)
- Genre: Christmas; pop; R&B
- Length: 3:28
- Label: SM; KT Music
- Composers: Kenzie; Kim Jeong-bae
- Lyricist: Kenzie
- Producer: Kenzie

"The First Snow" (Korean: 첫 눈; RR: Cheot Nun; Chinese: 初雪; pinyin: Chūxuě) is a song by South Korean–Chinese boy band Exo. It was released on December 9, 2013, as a B-side track from their second extended play Miracles in December. It was released in both Korean and Chinese versions by their label SM Entertainment. The track is a pop-ballad with heartfelt lyrics reminiscing about a former lover.

"The First Snow" has seen a significant rise in popularity each December since it was released. It initially debuted at number two on the Gaon Digital Chart in South Korea in 2013. Since then, it has returned to the charts in the holiday season following the arrival of the first snowfall. In 2023, a viral dance challenge helped propel "The First Snow" to the top of the Circle Digital Chart, ten years after the song's release.

== Release and promotion ==
On December 9, 2013, Exo released their second extended play Miracles in December with the lead single of the same name, which was promoted as a "special winter album". "The First Snow" was the fifth track on the extended play and was written and produced by Kenzie. Exo-K, Exo's Korean-language sub-group, recorded the track in Korean while Exo-M, the Mandarin-language sub-group, performed the same song in Mandarin.

"The First Snow" became a beloved seasonal favorite in South Korea, played often after the first snowfall. In 2023, Hwang Sehun uploaded a video of himself dancing to the song with snowflakes gently falling around him. His choreography quickly gained viral popularity, leading to a wave of participation in the dance challenge by K-pop idols and fans. The challenge became a global phenomenon, with members of K-pop groups NCT, NCT 127, NCT Dream, WayV, Riize, Red Velvet, Aespa, NCT Wish, Stray Kids, Zerobaseone, Purple Kiss, Kep1er, M.O.N.T, BoyNextDoor, Blackswan, Ateez, Itzy, Twice, Enhypen, Tomorrow X Together, and Ive joining in on the trend. The members of Exo themselves took part in the dance challenge as well. Lay was the first to join the trend, assuring fans of his participation in group activities despite his departure from SM Entertainment. Sehun posted his take as a gift to fans before his military enlistment on December 21, while Chanyeol added a twist by including his dog in the challenge. Baekhyun posted a video of him and fellow members Xiumin and Chen dancing to the song with snow falling on the road. Group leader Suho joined the challenge and posted it on Exo's's official TikTok account.

== Composition and lyrics ==
"The First Snow" has been described as a pop-ballad with an "acoustic R&B instrumental" and a holiday back-track featuring jingle bells. Lyrically, the song is centered around the theme of reminiscing about a past love, with the members wondering how their lover is doing as the first snow of the season falls. It delves into bittersweet emotions of nostalgia and regret associated with the onset of winter. The first snowfall evokes a sense of profound longing and melancholy, but also optimism and the promise of better days ahead, which can also be witnessed in the song's uplifting production.

== Commercial performance ==
"The First Snow" debuted at number two on Gaon Digital Chart on the chart dated December 8–14, 2013, while the Chinese version debuted at number 61 on the Gaon Digital Chart and number two on the Gaon Foreign Digital Chart on the same week. Additionally, "The First Snow" debuted at number 29 on the Billboard K-pop Hot 100 and peaked at number 12 the following week.

In 2020, "The First Snow" re-entered the Gaon Digital Chart for the first time and reached number 134 on the chart dated December 20–26, 2020. The following year, it reached number 50 on the chart dated December 19–25, 2021. In 2022, "The First Snow" peaked at number 29 on the chart (now renamed the Circle Digital Chart) dated December 18–24, 2022. Following the viral dance challenge, the song re-entered the top-ten for the first time since 2013, reaching number four on the chart dated December 10–16, 2023. It simultaneously topped all the real-time Korean charts, making it the first boy group song to achieve a "real-time all kill" in 2023 as well as Exo's eighth song to do so. The following week, on the chart dated December 17–23, the song topped the Circle Digital Chart for the first time ten years after release, becoming Exo's fifth number-one single and their first chart-topper in six years since "Ko Ko Bop" (2017).

== Accolades ==
On South Korea music programs, "The First Snow" achieved a first place win on the December 29 episode of Music Bank in 2023, ten years after its initial release.

Awards and nominations for "The First Snow"
| Organization | Year | Award | Result | Ref. |
|---|---|---|---|---|
| Seoul Music Awards | 2026 | Golden Revival Award | Won | |

== Charts ==
=== Weekly charts ===
| Chart (2013) | Peak position |
|---|---|
| South Korea (Gaon) | 2 |
| South Korea (Gaon) Chinese version | 61 |
| South Korea (K-Pop Hot 100) | 12 |

| Chart (2023–2024) | Peak position |
|---|---|
| Global Excl. US (Billboard) | 153 |
| Singapore Regional (RIAS) | 24 |
| South Korea (Circle) | 1 |

=== Monthly charts ===
| Chart (2013) | Position |
|---|---|
| South Korea (Gaon) | 20 |

| Chart (2023) | Position |
|---|---|
| South Korea (Circle) | 4 |

=== Year-end charts ===
| Chart | Year | Position |
|---|---|---|
| South Korea (Circle) | 2023 | 185 |
| South Korea (Circle) | 2024 | 72 |
| South Korea (Circle) | 2025 | 101 |

== Sales ==
| Region | Sales |
|---|---|
| South Korea (Gaon) | 355,698 |
| South Korea (Gaon) Chinese version | 27,830 |

== Release history ==
Release history for "The First Snow"
| Region | Date | Format | Label |
|---|---|---|---|
| Various | December 9, 2013 | Digital download; streaming | SM; KT Music |

== See also ==
- List of Circle Digital Chart number ones of 2023
