= Jung Hye-sung =

South Korean actress (born 1991)

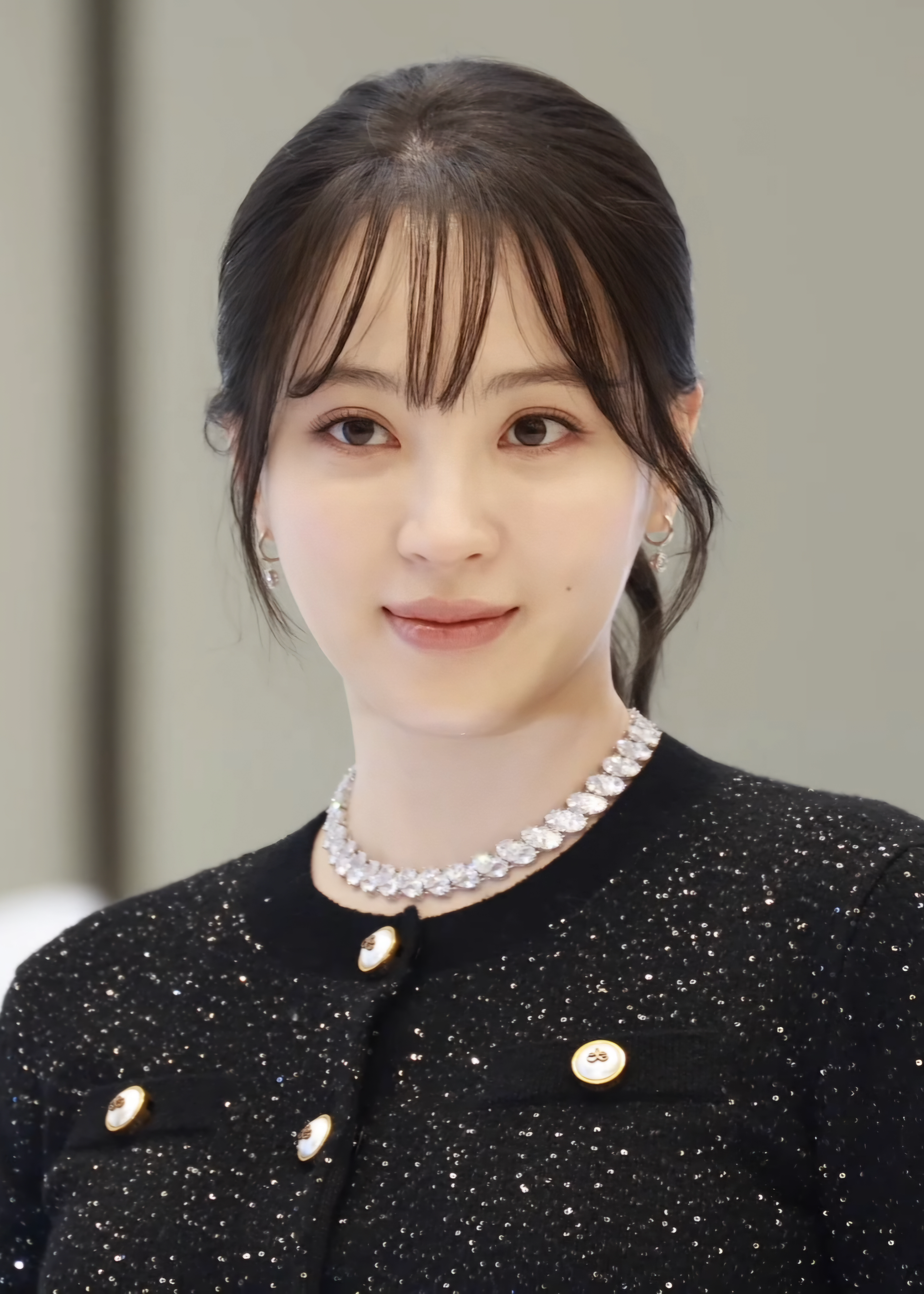
- Jung in January 2025
- Born: Jung Eun-joo; April 29, 1991 (age 35); Busan, South Korea
- Education: Sungkyunkwan University
- Occupations: Actress; model
- Years active: 2009–present
- Agent: Jellyfish Entertainment

Korean name
- Hangul: 정은주
- RR: Jeong Eunju
- MR: Chŏng Ŭnju

Stage name
- Hangul: 정혜성
- RR: Jeong Hyeseong
- MR: Chŏng Hyesŏng

Jung Eun-joo (Korean: 정은주; born April 29, 1991), known professionally as Jung Hye-sung (Korean: 정혜성), is a South Korean actress and model.

== Career ==
Jung began her acting career in To the Beautiful You (2012) and gained recognition through supporting roles in Love in the Moonlight (2016) and Good Manager (2017) before landing her first lead role in Oh, the Mysterious (2017).

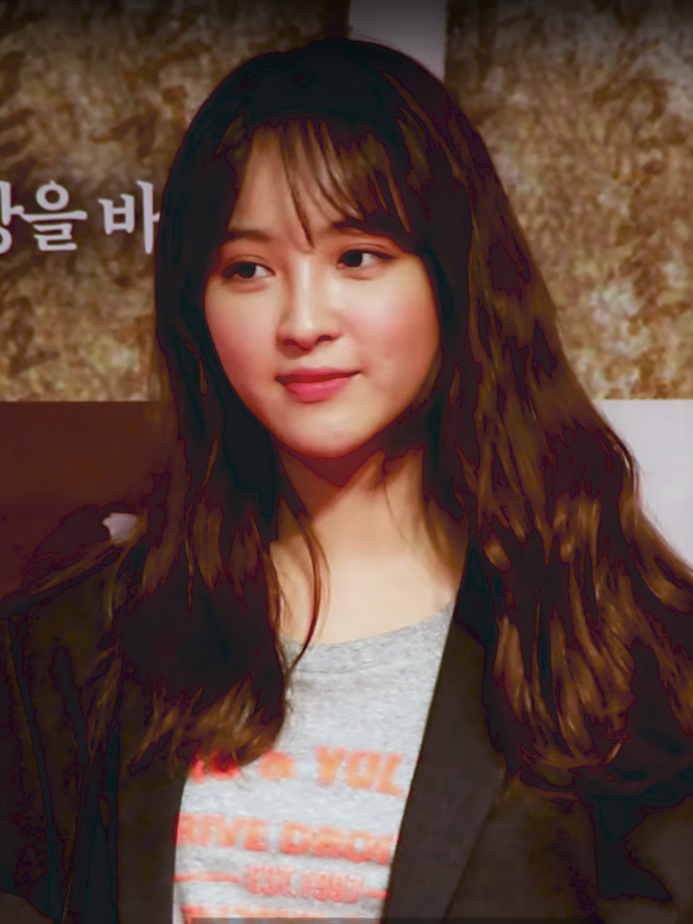
Jung in February 2018

In 2019, Jung made her big-screen debut with the romance film Mate starring opposite Shim Hee-sub.

In August 2022, Jung ended her contract with J-Wide Company and decided not to renew it.

In August 2026, Jung signed with new agency Jellyfish Entertainment.

== Filmography ==
=== Film ===
Year	Title	Role	Ref.
2019	Mate	Eun-ji	

=== Television series ===
Year	Title	Role	Ref.
2009	Friend, Our Legend	Shin-ae	
2012	To the Beautiful You	Hong Bo-hee	
2013	Special Affairs Team TEN 2	Bae Seo-yeon	
2013	Potato Star 2013QR3	Park Seung-hee	
2014	Glorious Day	Lee So-yi	
2014	Pride and Prejudice	Yoo Kwang-mi	
2015	Blood	Choi Soo-eun	
2015	A Daughter Just Like You	Ma Hee-sung	
2015	Oh My Venus	Jang Yi-jin	
2015	Remember	Nam Yeo-kyung	
2016	Love in the Moonlight	Princess Myung-eun	
2017	Good Manager	Hong Ga-eun	
2017	Manhole	Yoon Jin-sook	
2017	Oh, the Mysterious	Jin Jin-young	
2019	Pegasus Market	Jo Mi-ran	
2021	Joseon Exorcist	Moo Hwa	
2026	Efficient Dating for Singles	Jung Hyun-min	

=== Web series ===
Year	Title	Role	Ref.
2019	I Hate You, Juliet!	Gu Na-ra	
2022	New Normal Zine	Cha Ji-min	

=== Television shows ===
Year	Title	Role	Notes	Ref.
2016	We Got Married	Cast member	with Gong Myung (Episode 351–372, Season 4)	
2017	King of Mask Singer	Contestant (Eagle Brother Adjutant Bird)	Episode 112	
2017	Photo People in Paris	Cast member		
2018	Dunia: Into a New World	Cast member		
2019	Not the Same Person You Used to Know v2			
2021	Celebeauty Season3	MC		

=== Web shows ===
Year	Title	Role	Ref.
2022	Sleeping Only Relationship	Host	

=== Music videos appearances ===
Year	Song title	Artist	Ref.
2013	"Hello It's Me"	4Men	
2016	"You're So Fine"	CNBLUE	

== Awards and nominations ==
Name of the award ceremony, year presented, category, nominee of the award, and the result of the nomination
Award ceremony	Year	Category	Nominee / Work	Result	Ref.
KBS Drama Awards	2016	Best Supporting Actress	Love in the Moonlight	Nominated	
KBS Drama Awards	2017	Best Supporting Actress	Good Manager, Manhole	Won	
Korea Drama Awards	2018	Best New Actress	Oh, the Mysterious	Nominated	
MBC Drama Awards	2015	Best New Actress in a Serial Drama	A Daughter Just Like You	Nominated	
MBC Entertainment Awards	2018	Excellence Award in Variety Category	Dunia: Into a New World	Nominated	
SBS Drama Awards	2016	Special Award, Actress in a Genre Drama	Remember: War of the Son	Nominated	
SBS Drama Awards	2017	Excellence Award, Actress in a Monday-Tuesday Drama	Oh, the Mysterious	Nominated	
