= Good Manager =

2017 South Korean TV series

- Promotional poster
- Also known as: Manager Kim
- Hangul: 김과장
- Hanja: 金科長
- RR: Gim gwajang
- MR: Kim kwajang
- Genre: Workplace; Drama; Comedy
- Created by: KBS Drama Production
- Written by: Park Jae-beom
- Directed by: Lee Jae-hoon; Choi Yoon-suk
- Creative directors: Lee Seung-hoon; Choi Dong-sook
- Starring: Namkoong Min; Nam Sang-mi; Lee Jun-ho; Jung Hye-sung
- Composers: Hwang Dong-sub; Lee Sung-kyun
- Country of origin: South Korea
- Original language: Korean
- No. of episodes: 20

Production
- Executive producers: Kim Sung-geun KBS; Lee Jang-soo; Choi Tae-young
- Producers: Lee Eun-jin; Choi Jun-ho
- Production locations: Seoul & Gyeonggi Province, South Korea
- Cinematography: Wi Chang-suk; Kim Pil-seung
- Editors: Kim Mi-kyung; Lee Min-kyung
- Camera setup: Single-camera
- Running time: 60 minutes
- Production company: Logos Film

Original release
- Network: KBS2
- Release: January 25 – March 30, 2017

Good Manager (Korean: 김과장; lit. 'Chief Kim') is a South Korean television drama starring Namkoong Min, Nam Sang-mi, Lee Jun-ho, and Jung Hye-sung. It aired on KBS2 from January 25 to March 30, 2017, on Wednesdays and Thursdays at 22:00 (KST) for 20 episodes.

== Synopsis ==
Kim Sung-ryong, a certified public accountant who becomes a middle manager at TQ Group company in order to embezzle a large sum of money, ends up fighting for his employees' fundamental rights.

== Cast ==
=== Main ===
- Namkoong Min as Kim Sung-ryong (Jiro Kim)

Kim Sung-ryong used to be a small-time accountant from Gunsan, a small city in North Jeolla Province, working for a mobster. He was investigated every year for accounting fraud and tax evasion but was proven innocent every time. Then, he got accepted to TQ as the chief of their accounting department.

- Nam Sang-mi as Yoon Ha-Kyung (Hannah Yoon)

A strong and ethical woman. She is the assistant manager of TQ's accounting department.

- Lee Jun-ho as Seo Yul

Seo Yul used to be an ace prosecutor until the chairman of the TQ group appointed him to be the Director for Finance.

- Jung Hye-sung as Hong Ga-eun (Gail Hong)

A police officer working undercover as an intern of the Finance department, who was hired as a spy by a prosecutor.

=== Supporting ===
==== TQ Group Business Operation Department ====
- Kim Won-hae as Choo Nam-ho
- Kim Kang-hyun as Lee Jae-joon
- Jo Hyun-sik as Won Ki-ok
- Ryu Hye-rin as Bing Hee-jin
- Seo Ye-hwa as Je-ri
- Kim Seon-ho as Sun Sang-tae

==== People at TQ Group ====
- Park Yeong-gyu as Park Hyun-do (Dino Park)
- Lee Il-hwa as Jang Yoo-sun
- Seo Jeong-yeon as Jo Min-young
- Jung Suk-yong as Ko Man-geun
- Kim Min-sang as Lee Kang-shik
- Hwang Young-hee as Uhm Keum-shim
- Kim Jae-hwa as Na Hee-yong
- Dong Ha as Park Myung-suk (Mario Park)

==== People at Seoul Central District Prosecutors ====
- Jung Moon-sung as Han Dong-hoon
- Nam Sung-joon as Lee Suk-soo

==== People at Gunsan ====
- Lim Hwa-young as Oh Kwang-suk

=== Extended ===
- Lee Sung-wook
- Park Kwang-jae
- Jeon Ye-seo
- Nam Sang-baek
- Choi Kyu-shik
- Choi Jae-sub
- Eom Ji-man
- Jo Jae-won
- Heo Sun-haeng
- Lee Yoon-sang

=== Special appearances ===
- Kim Eung-soo as Bae Deok-po, gang leader (Ep. 1, 20)
- Lee Sang-hoon
- Song Yeong-gil
- Jung Kyung-ho as man blackmailing Kim Sung-ryong
- Lee Si-eon as Prosecutor Park Yong-tae (Ep. 20)
- Kim Kang-hoon as Kim Sung-ryong (young)
- Choi Jae-Hwan as Joong Gun, union leader (Ep. 5)
- Park Ji-il as Head of department Choi Ik-joong (Ep. 17)

== Production ==
- First script reading took place on December 15, 2016, at KBS Annex Broadcasting Station in Yeouido, Seoul, South Korea.

== Original soundtrack ==
Good Manager OST Album

Soundtrack album
- Genre: Soundtrack
- Languages: Korean, English
- Labels: LOEN Entertainment, The Groove Company
- Producers: Hwang Dong-sub, Lee Sung-kyun (The Groove)

=== Part 1 ===
No.	Title	Lyrics	Music	Artist	Length
1.	"Must Be The Money"	Kim Sung-tae; Lim Chul	Kim Sung-tae; Choi Hye-sun	DinDin	03:14
2.	"Must Be The Money" (Inst.)		Kim Sung-tae; Choi Hye-sun		03:14
Total length:					06:28

=== Part 2 ===
No.	Title	Lyrics	Music	Artist	Length
1.	"How It Happens"	Drew Ryan Scott	Drew Ryan Scott; Ping	After Romeo	03:37
2.	"How It Happens" (Inst.)		Drew Ryan Scott; Ping		03:37
Total length:					07:14

=== Part 3 ===
No.	Title	Lyrics	Music	Artist	Length
1.	"Starlight Falling Night" (별빛이 쏟아지는 밤)	Hwang Yong-ju	Hwang Yong-ju	Song Yuvin MYTEEN	03:29
2.	"Starlight Falling Night" (Inst.)		Hwang Yong-ju		03:29
Total length:					06:58

=== Part 4 ===
No.	Title	Lyrics	Music	Artist	Length
1.	"Will You Love Me"	Lee Shin-sung; ZigZag Note	ZigZag Note; Kim Young-sung	GB9, Kim So-hee	04:14
2.	"Will You Love Me" (Inst.)		ZigZag Note; Kim Young-sung		04:16
Total length:					08:30

=== Part 5 ===
No.	Title	Lyrics	Music	Artist	Length
1.	"Roller Coaster" (롤러코스터)	Kim Sung-tae	Kim Sung-tae; Lee Gun-woo	Seenroot	03:14
2.	"Roller Coaster" (Inst.)		Kim Sung-tae; Lee Gun-woo		03:14
Total length:					06:28

=== Part 6 ===
No.	Title	Lyrics	Music	Artist	Length
1.	"Dream" (꿈을 꾼다)	B.O.K; E-QLO; Seo Yeong-eun	B.O.K; E-QLO	Seo Yeong-eun	04:44
2.	"Dream" (Inst.)		B.O.K; E-QLO		04:44
Total length:					09:28

=== Part 7 ===
No.	Title	Lyrics	Music	Artist	Length
1.	"Unbelievable"	Lee Seung-woo	Lee Seung-woo; In Young-hun; Edison	Soulstar	03:41
2.	"Unbelievable" (Inst.)		Lee Seung-woo; In Young-hun; Edison		03:41
Total length:					07:22

=== Part 8 ===
No.	Title	Lyrics	Music	Artist	Length
1.	"That's Right" (그래)	Kim Sung-tae	Lee Gun-woo; Kim Sung-tae	Dalda	03:35
2.	"That's Right" (Inst.)		Lee Gun-woo; Kim Sung-tae		03:35
Total length:					07:10

== Reception ==
Despite competing against big-budget drama Saimdang, Light's Diary in the same time slot and having no big-name stars, the drama managed to top ratings during its run and enjoyed explosive popularity. It received positive reviews for its punchy and satirical lines on the corrupt corporate owners and the society, which resonated with the viewers; and the multifaceted performance of lead actor Namkoong Min, whose perfect amalgamation of character creation and acting saves "Good Manager" from what could have been an average office crime comedy.The Korea Times said that the drama "has the ability to tell uncomfortable stories (story of embezzlement cases, mass layoffs and other societal issues regarding fierce competition) in a witty way".

== Ratings ==
In this table, the blue numbers represent the lowest ratings and the red numbers represent the highest ratings.

Ep.	Original broadcast date	Average audience share			
Ep.	Original broadcast date	TNmS		AGB Nielsen	
Ep.	Original broadcast date	Nationwide	Seoul	Nationwide	Seoul
1	January 25, 2017	6.6% (19th)	7.1% (19th)	7.8% (17th)	7.7% (15th)
2	January 26, 2017	6.3% (20th)	6.5% (18th)	7.2% (18th)	7.2% (15th)
3	February 1, 2017	11.7% (7th)	13.3% (4th)	12.8% (5th)	12.8% (5th)
4	February 2, 2017	11.5% (7th)	13.3% (4th)	13.8% (4th)	14.1% (4th)
5	February 8, 2017	13.2% (4th)	15.5% (4th)	15.5% (4th)	15.8% (4th)
6	February 9, 2017	12.1% (6th)	12.9% (4th)	16.7% (4th)	17.6% (3rd)
7	February 15, 2017	13.1% (4th)	15.0% (4th)	16.1% (4th)	16.3% (4th)
8	February 16, 2017	13.7% (4th)	15.6% (4th)	17.6% (4th)	17.3% (4th)
9	February 22, 2017	15.5% (4th)	16.2% (4th)	17.8% (3rd)	18.0% (3rd)
10	February 23, 2017	15.2% (4th)	15.6% (4th)	17.2% (4th)	17.3% (3rd)
11	March 1, 2017	15.6% (4th)	17.0% (3rd)	18.4% (3rd)	19.2% (3rd)
12	March 2, 2017	16.3% (4th)	17.8% (3rd)	18.4% (3rd)	18.5% (3rd)
13	March 8, 2017	15.3% (4th)	16.2% (4th)	16.8% (4th)	16.8% (4th)
14	March 9, 2017	14.3% (4th)	14.9% (4th)	17.1% (4th)	16.9% (3rd)
15	March 15, 2017	14.6% (4th)	16.1% (3rd)	18.4% (4th)	19.1% (3rd)
16	March 16, 2017	16.2% (4th)	18.1% (3rd)	17.1% (4th)	17.6% (3rd)
17	March 22, 2017	17.4% (4th)	19.7% (4th)	17.4% (4th)	17.5% (4th)
18	March 23, 2017	16.0% (4th)	17.3% (3rd)	17.0% (4th)	17.5% (3rd)
19	March 29, 2017	17.0% (4th)	18.6% (3rd)	16.9% (4th)	16.8% (4th)
20	March 30, 2017	18.0% (4th)	18.7% (3rd)	17.2% (4th)	17.8% (3rd)
Average		14.0%	15.3%	15.9%	16.1%

== Awards and nominations ==
Year	Award	Category	Recipient	Result
2017	53rd Baeksang Arts Awards	Best Actor	Namkoong Min	Nominated
2017	44th Korean Broadcasting Awards	Actor Award	Namkoong Min	Won
2017	10th Korea Drama Awards	Best Drama	Good Manager	Nominated
2017	10th Korea Drama Awards	Best Production Director	Lee Jang-soo	Won
2017	10th Korea Drama Awards	Best Screenplay	Lee Eun-jin	Nominated
2017	10th Korea Drama Awards	Top Excellence Award, Actor	Namkoong Min	Nominated
2017	10th Korea Drama Awards	Excellence Award, Actress	Lee Il-hwa	Won
2017	10th Korea Drama Awards	Best Original Soundtrack	DinDin (Must Be The Money)	Won
2017	1st The Seoul Awards	Best Actor	Namkoong Min	Nominated
2017	31st KBS Drama Awards	Top Excellence Award, Actor	Namkoong Min	Won
2017	31st KBS Drama Awards	Excellence Award, Actor in a Mid-length Drama	Lee Jun-ho	Won
2017	31st KBS Drama Awards	Excellence Award, Actor in a Mid-length Drama	Namkoong Min	Nominated
2017	31st KBS Drama Awards	Excellence Award, Actress in a Mid-length Drama	Nam Sang-mi	Nominated
2017	31st KBS Drama Awards	Best Supporting Actor	Dong Ha	Nominated
2017	31st KBS Drama Awards	Best Supporting Actor	Kim Won-hae	Nominated
2017	31st KBS Drama Awards	Best Supporting Actress	Lee Il-hwa	Won
2017	31st KBS Drama Awards	Best Supporting Actress	Jung Hye-sung	Won
2017	31st KBS Drama Awards	Best Supporting Actress	Seo Jeong-yeon	Nominated
2017	31st KBS Drama Awards	Best New Actor	Kim Seon-ho	Nominated
2017	31st KBS Drama Awards	Best New Actor	Lee Jun-ho	Nominated
2017	31st KBS Drama Awards	Best New Actress	Lim Hwa-young	Nominated
2017	31st KBS Drama Awards	Netizen Award – Male	Namkoong Min	Nominated
2017	31st KBS Drama Awards	Netizen Award – Male	Lee Jun-ho	Nominated
2017	31st KBS Drama Awards	Best Couple Award	Namkoong Min & Nam Sang-mi	Nominated
2017	31st KBS Drama Awards	Best Couple Award	Namkoong Min & Lee Jun-ho	Won
2018	30th Korea Producer Awards	Best Drama	Good Manager	Won

== Adaptation ==
It was announced on March 24, 2017, that KBS Media will publish a book titled "Chief Kim's Work Book" set to be released in April related to the drama that will contain great tips for work life. The book will feature the drama's best scenes, best lines, and all of the illustrated episode endings. The illustrations will be drawn by webtoon artist Yang Kyung-soo, who partnered with the drama to create the ending scenes for each episode. This project is the first collaboration between a drama and a webtoon.
