= Miracles in December =

- Covers for the Korean version (left) and Chinese version (right)

EP by EXO
- Released: 9 December 2013
- Recorded: 2013
- Studios: Doobdoob (Seoul); Hub; Ocean Way (Nashville)
- Genres: Christmas; R&B
- Length: 24:33
- Languages: Korean; Mandarin; English
- Labels: SM; KT
- Producer: Lee Soo-man

EXO chronology
| XOXO (2013) | Miracles in December (2013) | Overdose (2014) |

Singles from Miracles in December
- 1. "Miracles in December" Released: 5 December 2013

Miracles in December (Korean: 12월의 기적; Chinese: 十二月的奇迹) is the second extended play by South Korean–Chinese boy band Exo. It was released by SM Entertainment on 9 December 2013. Presented as a special winter album, Miracles in December is a follow-up to the group's first studio album XOXO, which was released in June 2013. Like all of the group's music until Universe in 2017, the EP has Korean and Chinese versions. The EP is also the group's second release as well as first EP to be promoted extensively being as a combined group.

"Miracles in December" was chosen as the title track and first single of the extended play, and along with "Christmas Day" was presented live on several local musical performances and concerts during the promotional cycle. The Korean version peaked at number two on the Gaon Digital Chart and at number three on the K-pop Hot 100, while the Mandarin version topped the Gaon International Singles chart. "The First Snow", a B-side track from the album, saw a significant rise in popularity each December and eventually reached number one on the Circle Digital Chart in 2023, ten years after release.

== Background and recording ==
In early November 2013, Exo's management agency, SM Entertainment, announced Exo would be holding a joint concert, titled "Christmas Wonderland", with f(x) from 24 to 25 December. On 3 December, a 2-minute medley clip for the Korean and Mandarin-language versions of the Miracles in December EP were released. On 4 December, the music videos for "Miracles in December" were unveiled on YouTube.

Released in two languages, Exo-K, Exo's Korean-language sub-group, recorded the EP's tracks in Korean while Exo-M, the Mandarin-language sub-group, performed the same songs in Mandarin. A pop ballad with classical piano accompaniment, the lead single "Miracles in December", was written by Andreas Stone Johansson and Rick Hanley. However, the song was only performed by four Exo members: Baekhyun, D.O., and Chen recorded the song in Korean, while Baekhyun, Chen, and Luhan recorded it in Mandarin. Special performances by all four (Baekhyun, D.O., Chen, and Luhan) members, with Lay miming the piano, were often performed on made-for-TV live music programs such as Inkigayo and Music Bank.

== Composition and background ==
"Miracles in December" according to the description of the album on the site of Korean music Naver Music is a song genre pop-ballad that uses the piano and strings in your arrangement. The song was composed and arranged by composers veterans such as Andreas Johansson Stone and Rick Hanley in collaboration with the production team of SM Entertainment. The voices in the Korean version are provided by Chen, Baekhyun and D.O., while the mandarin version belongs to the first two, and Luhan. The song talks about a man who recalls with nostalgia the relationship with his former girlfriend and his desire to return to it, but cannot do so because of the shame and guilt. Yoon So Ra and Liu Yuan wrote the letters of the Korean and Chinese version respectively.

== Release ==
The music videos for "Miracles in December" (one Korean, one Mandarin) were directed by Jo So-hyun, and were filmed in November in Paju, Gyeonggi-do and a studio in Ilsan, near Seoul. On 2 December 2013, a few teasers for the Korean and Chinese version of the music video was released on official YouTube channel of SM Town, causing a lot of interest from fans. This, however, many thought that the group was promoting as a new sub-unit, which led to SM to clarify the rumors. A representative of the agency said that "it is true Baekhyun, D.O. and Chen to sing the single main... That does not mean that they are officially a sub-unit... We are planning to implement other members also to climb on stage for various performances". And continued: "We are preparing several performances because this album is a special album of winter and is full of gratitude to the fans and it is not correct to call this a new sub-unit activity."

On 4 December 2013, both versions of the videos were announced, at 8:00pm (KST) and were released on video-sharing websites. The music video was directed by Jo Soo-hyun, and was filmed in November in Paju, Gyeonggi in a study in Ilsan. On 5 December, Exo held their debut performances from the album with "Miracles in December" on Mnet's M Countdown stage.; and the song was made available for download as digital single. On 9 December 2013, the EP Miracles in December was released. On 19 December, the group staged the Korean version of "Christmas Day" (Simplified Chinese: 耶诞节) on M Countdown. Performances featured all twelve members of Exo with accompanying choreography produced by Tony Testa and Greg Hwang.

== Reception ==
=== Critical reception ===
K-pop critic "Seoulbeats" gave a positive review of the song saying that "[it's] really worth all the hype that it's receiving." Analysis indicated that "Miracles in December" just grows and grows throughout its duration and commended the harmonization as "a thing of beauty".

This album's B-side track "The First Snow" became a beloved seasonal favorite in South Korea, played often after the first snowfall. In 2023, a dance challenge set the song quickly gained viral popularity, leading to a wave of participation by K-pop idols and fans. The challenge became a global phenomenon, with members of various K-pop groups and eventually Exo themselves joining in on the trend.

=== Commercial performance ===
The EP peaked at number 1 and 2 on both the weekly and monthly charts on the Gaon Album Chart for the Korean and Mandarin versions, respectively. The single "Miracles in December" reached number 2 on the Gaon Digital Chart and number 3 on the K-pop Hot 100. The Mandarin version of the song peaked at number 47 on the Gaon chart, but topped the Gaon International Singles Chart. It also went to number 7 on China's Baidu charts. The Korean edition of "Christmas Day" reached number 5 and 38 on the Gaon and K-pop Hot 100 weekly charts, respectively, and the Mandarin edition reached number 10 on Baidu's charts. In 2023, "The First Snow" reached number one on the Circle Digital Chart ten years after release due to its viral dance challenge.

== Live performances ==
In December, Exo began their promotions running Korean version live on several local music programs, including M Countdown 5, Music Bank 6, Show! Music Core 7 and Inkigayo 8. In the following week's promotions, SM informed that Luhan and Lay also participate in presentations, as well as promised the fans. Baekhyun, Chen and D.O. appeared on the stage of SBS MTV's The Show on 17 December 2013, and Show Champion on 18 December 2013. The song was also included in the set-list of the winter festival of the group with his classmates seal f(x) SM Town Week: Christmas Wonderland on 23 and 24 December 2013. The Chinese version of "Miracles in December" was acted in the MTV The Show on 24 December 2013, with D.O., Luhan, Baekhyun, Chen and Lay members.

== Track listing ==
Korean version track listing
| No. | Title | Lyrics | Music | Arrangement | Length |
|---|---|---|---|---|---|
| 1. | "Miracles in December" (12월의 기적; Sibiwolui Gijeok; lit. 'Miracle of December') sung by Baekhyun, Chen, D.O.)) | Sarah Yoon | Andreas Stone Johansson; Ricky Hanley | Don Spike | 4:34 |
| 2. | "Christmas Day" (sung by: Suho, Xiumin, Luhan, Baekhyun, Chen, Lay, D.O.) | Misfit | Gabriela Soza; Samantha Powell; Philip Hochstrate | Gabriela Soza; Samantha Powell; Philip Hochstrate | 3:46 |
| 3. | "The Star" (sung by Suho, Kris, Baekhyun, Chanyeol, D.O., Kai, Sehun) | Soulfulmonster | Im Kwang-wook (Devine Channel); Martin Mulholland; Nermin Harambašić | Im Kwang-wook (Devine Channel) | 4:07 |
| 4. | "My Turn to Cry" (sung by Baekhyun, Chen, D.O.) | Young-hu Kim | Alex Cantrall; Phillip Anthony White; Jeff Hoeppner | Alex Cantrall; Phillip Anthony White; Jeff Hoeppner | 4:07 |
| 5. | "The First Snow" (첫 눈; Cheot Nun; lit. 'First Snow') sung by EXO-K) | Kenzie | Kim Jeong-bae; Kenzie | Kenzie | 3:27 |
| 6. | "Miracles in December – Classical Orchestra Version" (12월의 기적; Sibiweolwi Gijeok; lit. 'Miracle of December') | | Andreas Stone Johansson; Ricky Hanley | Don Spike | 4:33 |
| Total length: | | | | | 24:33 |

Chinese version track listing
| No. | Title | Lyrics | Music | Arrangement | Length |
|---|---|---|---|---|---|
| 1. | "十二月的奇迹 (Miracles in December)" (Traditional Chinese: 十二月的奇蹟; Shíèryuè de Qíjì, sung by Luhan, Baekhyun, Chen) (Trans.: Miracle(s) of December) | Liu Yuan | Andreas Stone Johansson; Ricky Hanley | Don Spike | 4:33 |
| 2. | "圣诞节 (Christmas Day)" (Traditional Chinese: 聖誕節; Shèngdànjié, sung by Suho, Xiumin, Luhan, Baekhyun, Chen, Lay, D.O.) (Trans.: Christmas) | Liu Yuan | Gabriela Soza; Philip Hochstrate; Samantha Powell | Gabriela Soza; Philip Hochstrate; Samantha Powell | 3:46 |
| 3. | "The Star (星)" (sung by Xiumin, Luhan, Baekhyun, Kris, D.O., Chen, Lay, Tao) (Trans.: Star) | T-Crash | Im Kwang-wook (Devine Channel); Martin Mulholland; Nermin Harambašić | Im Kwang-wook (Devine Channel) | 4:07 |
| 4. | "爱离开 (My Turn to Cry)" (Traditional Chinese: 愛離開; Ài Líkāi, sung by Luhan, Baekhyun, Chen) (Trans.: Love Has Left) | Wang Yajun | Alex Cantrall; Jeff Hoeppner; Philip Anthony White | Alex Cantrall; Jeff Hoeppner; Philip Anthony White | 4:07 |
| 5. | "初雪 (The First Snow)" (Chūxuě, sung by Exo-M (Trans.: First Snow) | Kenzie | Kim Jeong-bae; Kenzie | Kenzie | 3:27 |
| 6. | "十二月的奇迹 (Miracles in December) – Classical Orchestra Version" (Shíèryuè de Qíjì) (Trans.: Miracle(s) of December) | | Andreas Stone Johansson; Ricky Hanley | Don Spike | 4:33 |
| Total length: | | | | | 24:33 |

== Charts ==
Korean and Chinese versions
| Chart | Peak position | |
| Chart | Korean | Chinese |
|---|---|---|
| South Korea Weekly Albums (Gaon) | 1 | 2 |
| South Korea Monthly Albums (Gaon) | 1 | 2 |
| South Korea Yearly Albums – 2013 | 4 | 10 |
| South Korea Yearly Albums – 2014 | 34 | 66 |
| Japan Weekly Albums (Oricon) | 7 | 20 |
| Japan Monthly Albums (Oricon) | 24 | 48 |

Combined version
| Chart | Peak position |
|---|---|
| US World Albums (Billboard) | 1 |

== Awards and nominations ==
| Year | Award | Category | Result |
|---|---|---|---|
| 2014 | Gaon Chart K-Pop Awards | Album of the Year – 4th Quarter | Won |

== Sales ==
| Chart | Sales |
|---|---|
| Japan (Oricon) | 11,734 (Chinese version) |
| Japan (Oricon) | 24,530 (Korean version) |
| South Korea (Gaon) | 204,438 (Chinese version) |
| South Korea (Gaon) | 352,189 (Korean version) |

== Release history ==
| Region | Date | Format | Label |
|---|---|---|---|
| Worldwide | 9 December 2013 | CD; Digital download | SM Entertainment |
| South Korea | 9 December 2013 | CD; Digital download | SM Entertainment; KT Music |
| Taiwan | 17 December 2013 | CD | Avex Taiwan |
| Thailand | 20 December 2013 | CD | SM True |
