= Marry You (TV series) =

2024 South Korean television series

- Promotional poster
- Hangul: 결혼해YOU
- RR: GyeolhonhaeYOU
- MR: KyŏrhonhaeYOU
- Genre: Family; Comedy; Melodrama
- Written by: Ri Na
- Directed by: Hwang Kyeong-seong
- Starring: Lee Yi-kyung; Jo Soo-min; Koo Jun-hoe; Ji Yi-soo
- Music by: Choi In-hee
- Country of origin: South Korea
- Original language: Korean
- No. of episodes: 10

Production
- Executive producers: Park Jong-eun; Jo Hang-no; Jeong Seong-won
- Producers: Park Dong-hwi; Kim Da-ye; Kim Dong-wook; Seo Jang-won; Park Sung-soo; Park Chae-rin
- Running time: 60 minutes
- Production companies: Chorokbaem Media; One Entertainment

Original release
- Network: Channel A
- Release: November 16 – December 15, 2024

Marry You (Korean: 결혼해YOU) is a 2024 South Korean television series starring Lee Yi-kyung, Jo Soo-min, Koo Jun-hoe and Ji Yi-soo. It aired on Channel A from November 16 to December 15, 2024, every Saturday and Sunday at 19:50 (KST).

== Synopsis ==
Marry You tells the story about an island bachelor Bong Cheol-hee whose life goal is marriage and Jung Ha-na, a 7th-grade civil servant who absolutely does not want to get married.

== Cast and characters ==
=== Main ===
- Lee Yi-kyung as Bong Cheol-hee

A pure and harmless island bachelor. He is a versatile worker in an island village called Cheongdo, and a unique character who cares for his twin nephew and niece on his own.

- Jo Soo-min as Jung Ha-na

A 7th-grade civil servant who is a non-marriage advocate. She was assigned to the 'Marriage Fraud Promotion Team' due to some incident, is given the important task of making the marriage of the island bachelor Cheol-hee happen.

- Koo Jun-hoe as Choi Ki-joon

The head of the 'Marriage Fraud Promotion Team' that Ha-na belongs to.

- Ji Yi-soo as Oh In-ah

3rd generation chaebol heiress who went to university with Ha-na and Ki-Joon, very interested in Cheol-Hee. The ideal type of many men.

=== Marriage Morale Boost Team ===
- Woo Hyun as Lim Goo-sik
- Kim Mi-ryu as Lee Ji-kyeong
- Kim Kang-hyun as Yang Seung-koo
- Song Yi-dam as Han Bin
- Jeon Seo-jin as Na Ji-won
- Son So-mang as Moon Young-eun

=== Child actors ===
- Ahn Tae-rin as Bong Ba-da
- Seo Woo-jin as Bong San-i

=== Special appearances ===
- Chu So-jung as Cha Min-ji

An applicant who visits the 'Marriage Fraud Promotion Team' to meet a good match and Cheol-hee's blind date partner.

- Lee Luda as Jin-sol

== Ratings ==
Average TV viewership ratings (nationwide)
Ep.	Original broadcast date	Average audience share (Nielsen Korea)
1	November 16, 2024	0.763% (24th)
2	November 17, 2024	0.706% (35th)
3	November 23, 2024	0.958% (19th)
4	November 24, 2024	1.035% (23rd)
5	November 30, 2024	0.934% (24th)
6	December 1, 2024	1.162% (21st)
7	December 8, 2024	0.843% (31st)
8	December 8, 2024	1.096% (23rd)
9	December 15, 2024	0.601% (34th)
10	December 15, 2024	0.915% (28th)
Average		0.901%
In the table above, the blue numbers represent the lowest ratings and the red numbers represent the highest ratings.; This drama aired on a cable channel/pay TV which normally has a relatively smaller audience compared to free-to-air TV/public broadcasters (KBS, SBS, MBC, and EBS).
