= Lee Lu-da =

South Korean singer and actress (born 1997)

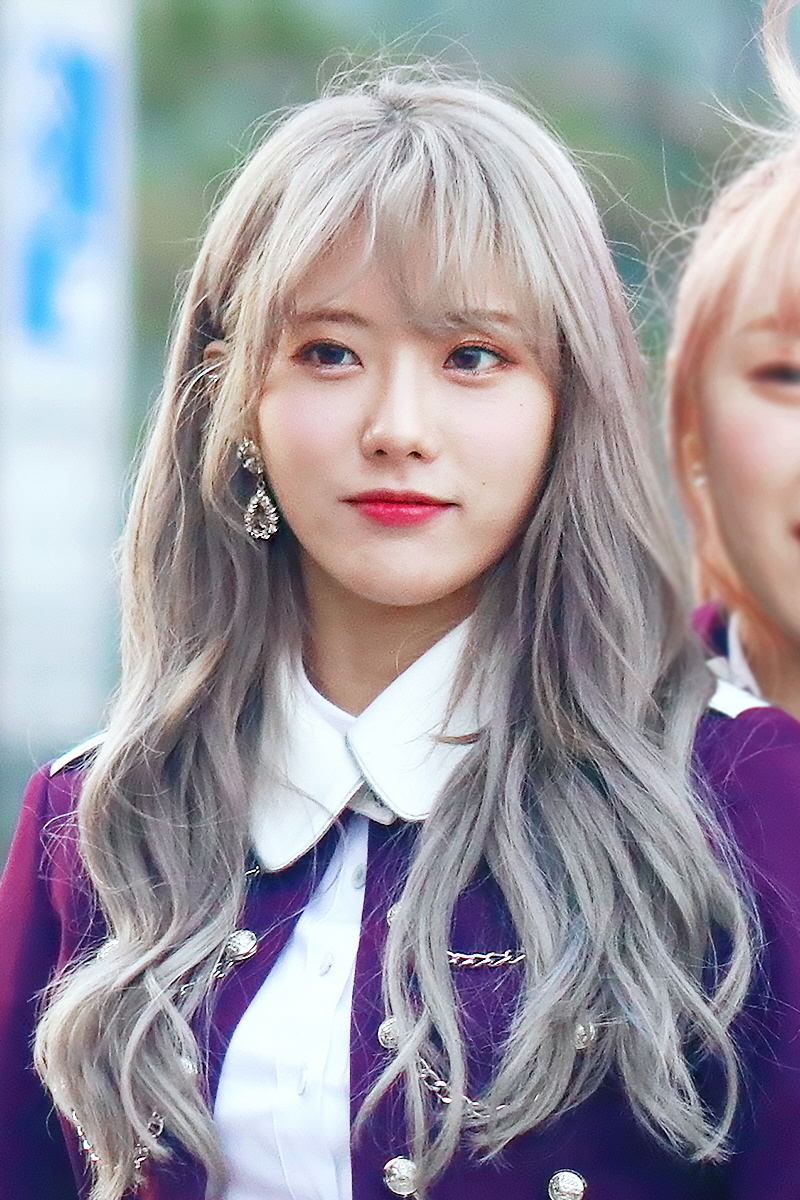
- Lee in 2018
- Born: February 6, 1997 (age 29); Seoul, South Korea
- Occupations: Singer; actress
- Years active: 2016–present
- Agent: NTOV Entertainment
- Musical career
- Genre: K-pop
- Instrument: Vocals
- Labels: Starship; Yuehua
- Member of: WJSN; WJSN Chocome
- Formerly of: WJMK; Starship Planet

Korean name
- Hangul: 이루다
- RR: I Ruda
- MR: I Ruda

Signature
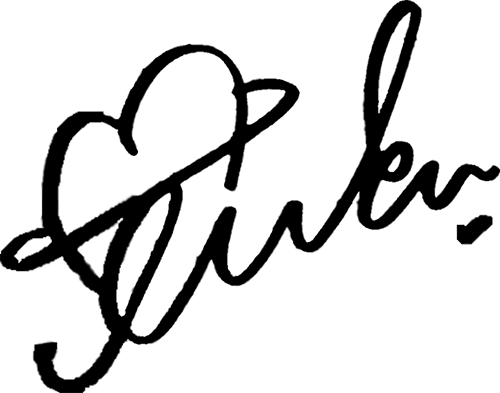

Lee Lu-da (Korean: 이루다; born February 6, 1997), also known mononymously as Luda, is a South Korean singer and actress. She is a member of the South Korean girl group WJSN.

== Career ==
=== 2016–present: Debut with WJSN, WJMK and solo activities ===
Lee was revealed to be a member of WJSN and its 'Natural Unit' on December 31, 2015. WJSN debuted on February 25, 2016, with the release of their debut EP Would You Like?, including the lead singles "Mo Mo Mo" and "Catch Me".

On May 2, 2018, Lee became a member of the collaboration between Starship Entertainment and Fantagio to form a special four-member unit named WJMK, consisting of members of their respective girl groups WJSN and Weki Meki. They released the single "Strong" on June 1, 2018, along with the music video.

In 2018, she was cast as a member of the MBC variety show Dunia: Into a New World. Lee released her first solo single, titled "Dreamland", as part of the official soundtrack for Dunia: Into a New World.

On September 23, 2020, it was announced that Lee, alongside bandmates Dayoung, Soobin, and Yeoreum, formed their sub-unit WJSN Chocome. They released their debut single album Hmph!, and its title track with the same name on October 7, 2020.

On September 19, 2022, Starship Entertainment announced that Lee made her acting debut in the web series My 20th Twenty, which was released on April 21, 2023.

On March 3, 2023, Starship Entertainment announced that Lee had chosen not to renew her contract with the label, however it was stated that she hadn't left the group.

On April 19, 2023, Lee signed an exclusive contract with SidusHQ as an actress. On July 14, 2026, Lee left SidusHQ. Lee joined NTOV Entertainment in August 2026.

== Discography ==
=== Soundtrack appearances ===
List of soundtrack appearances, showing year released and album name
Title	Year	Album
"Dreamland"	2018	Dunia: Into a New World OST Part 2
"Eyes On You"	2023	My 20th Twenty OST Part 2

== Filmography ==
=== Film ===
Year	Title	Role	Ref.
2026	Wi-Fi Love in the Palace	So-hyang	
TBA	The Other Side	Ho-eun	
TBA	Pink Box (lit.)	Ban Ji-woo	

=== Television series ===
Year	Title	Role	Notes	Ref.
2022	Gaus Electronics	Herself	Cameo (episode 6)	
2024	Marry You	Jin-sol	Cameo (episode 4)	
2025	The Woman Who Swallowed the Sun	Baek Mi-so		

=== Web series ===
Year	Title	Role	Ref.
2023	Rinza Noodle House	Da-na	
2023	My 20th Twenty	Bae Nou-ri	
2025	The Villain Next Door	Park Se-young	

=== Television shows ===
Year	Title	Role	Notes	Ref.
2018	Dunia: Into a New World	Cast member	Episode 1–15	
2018	Visiting Tutor	Cast member		
2022	My House Sangjeon	Cast member		

=== Music video appearances ===
Year	Song Title	Artist	Ref.
2024	"There's still someone I love"	KCM	

== Awards and nominations ==
Award	Year	Category	Nominated work	Result	Ref.
18th MBC Entertainment Awards	2018	Rookie Award in Variety Category	Dunia: Into a New World	Nominated	
