= Not the Same Person You Used to Know =

South Korean variety show

- Promotional poster
- Also known as: Guess My Next Move
- Hangul: 니가 알던 내가 아냐
- RR: Niga aldeon naega anya
- MR: Niga aldŏn naega anya
- Genre: Game show; Variety show
- Directed by: Hong Ji-hyun
- Starring: See below
- Country of origin: South Korea
- Original language: Korean
- No. of seasons: 2
- No. of episodes: 13 (list of episodes)

Production
- Production location: South Korea
- Camera setup: Multi-camera setup
- Running time: 70-80 minutes

Original release
- Network: Mnet
- Release: December 20, 2018 – August 15, 2019

Not the Same Person You Used to Know (Korean: 니가 알던 내가 아냐) is a South Korean variety show which premiered on Mnet on December 20, 2018. It was aired every Thursday at 23:00 (KST).

On May 8, 2019 it was confirmed that the show will return for a second season, with DinDin the only cast member from Season 1 to return. The new members include Lee Sang-min, Boom, Jang Sung-kyu and Jung Hye-sung. The second season, named V2, was expected to air every Thursday at 20:00 (KST) starting from June 27, 2019. The season ended on August 15, 2019.

== Format ==
Acquaintances of a celebrity (friends, managers, parents, siblings, etc.) are invited to answer a quiz about the celebrity to see if they know him/her as well as they think they do. For instance, they will have to watch videos of the celebrity and predict his/her next actions.

For Season 2, a slightly different change is that 4 guests related to the celebrity are invited to the show and take on the Non-related Observers (the cast members except Jang Sung-kyu) in a quiz about the celebrity. A total of ₩3,000,000 is up for grabs and the team with more winning money wins the quiz.

== Cast ==
=== Season 1 ===
Name	Episode	Ref.
Lee Soo-geun	1 – 6	
Jang Do-yeon	1 – 6	
DinDin	1 – 6	
JR (NU'EST)	1, 3 – 6	

=== Season 2 ===
Name	Role	Episode	Ref.
Jang Sung-kyu	Game Master	1 – 7	
Lee Sang-min	Non-related Observers	1 – 7	
Boom	Non-related Observers	1 – 7	
Jung Hye-sung	Non-related Observers	1 – 7	
DinDin	Non-related Observers	1 – 7	

== Episodes ==
=== Season 1 ===
Ep.	Broadcast Date	Protagonist	Guests	Note(s)	Ref.
1	December 20, 2018	Seolhyun (AOA)	Jimin (AOA); Kim Joo-hyun (Seolhyun's elder sister); Choi Hyun-seok (chef); Kim Jae-hyun (N.Flying); Kim Ji-na (stylist); Sleepy	—	
2	December 27, 2018	Jung Joon-young	Jung Joon-ha (Jung Joon-young's elder brother); Defconn; Choi Jong-hoon (F.T. Island); Go Eun-ah; Park Sang-hyuk (Jung Joon-young's good friend)	Seungkwan (Seventeen) stood in as special MC for JR, who was absent due to other schedules	
3	January 3, 2019	Gray	Loco; Lee Tae-young (Gray's father); DJ Pumkin; Jang Seung-jin (Gray's friend of 25 years); Choi Do-kwan (composer); Swings	Special video appearance by Woo Won-jae	
4	January 10, 2019	Swings	Giriboy; Han Yo-han (rapper, songwriter); Superbee (rapper); Kwon Hyuk-soo; Im Bo-ra (Swings' girlfriend); Jenny Kim (Swings' mother)	Special video appearance by Kid Milli	
5	January 17, 2019	Hani (EXID)	LE (EXID); Kim Dong-hyun; Ahn Tae-hwan (Hani's younger brother); Sandeul (B1A4); Oh Ye-na (Hani's friend of 18 years)	Special video appearances by EXID (Solji, Hyelin, Jeonghwa)	
6	January 24, 2019	Loco	Gray; DinDin (appearing as guest for this episode); Jeong Hee-sook (Loco's mother); Kim Dae-yoon (Loco's friend of 13 years); Lee Sang-won (Loco's high school friend); Lee Do-hwan (Co-partner of The Famous Burger with Loco)	—	

=== Season 2 ===
Ep.	Broadcast Date	Protagonist	Guests	Results	Note(s)	Ref.
1	June 27, 2019	Jeon So-mi	Zion.T; Cao Lu; Eunbin (CLC); Ryoo Soo-jeong (Jeon So-mi's cousin)	Non-related Observers win	Special video appearances by Matthew Douma and Kim Sae-ron	
2	July 4, 2019	Solbi	Jang Dong-min; Sleepy; Julian Quintart; Angelina Danilova	Non-related Observers win	—	
3	July 11, 2019	Lee Dae-hwi (AB6IX)	Heize; Park So-hyun; Lee Chae-yeon (Iz*One); Yoo Seon-ho	Guests win	—	
4	July 18, 2019	Park Joon-hyung (g.o.d)	g.o.d (Danny Ahn, Son Ho-young); Hwang Chi-yeul; Kim Sang-hyuk (Singer, actor, formerly of Click-B)	Non-related Observers win	—	
5	July 25, 2019	Jung Hye-sung	Lee Jun-hyeok; Lee Guk-joo; Baek Jin-hee; Shim So-young (model)	Guests win	Lee Mi-joo (Lovelyz) stood in as special Non-related Observer	
6	August 8, 2019	Don Spike	Kim Bo-sung; Choi Hyun-seok; Hong Yoon-hwa (Comedienne); Austin Kang (Chef, television personality)	Non-related Observers win	No broadcast on August 1, 2019 due to the live broadcast of 2019 M2 X Genie Music Awards	
7	August 15, 2019	Yoon Bo-mi (Apink)	Lee Guk-joo; Ravi (VIXX); Apink (Park Cho-rong, Oh Ha-young)	Guests win		
