= Ji Yi-soo =

South Korean actress (born 1991)

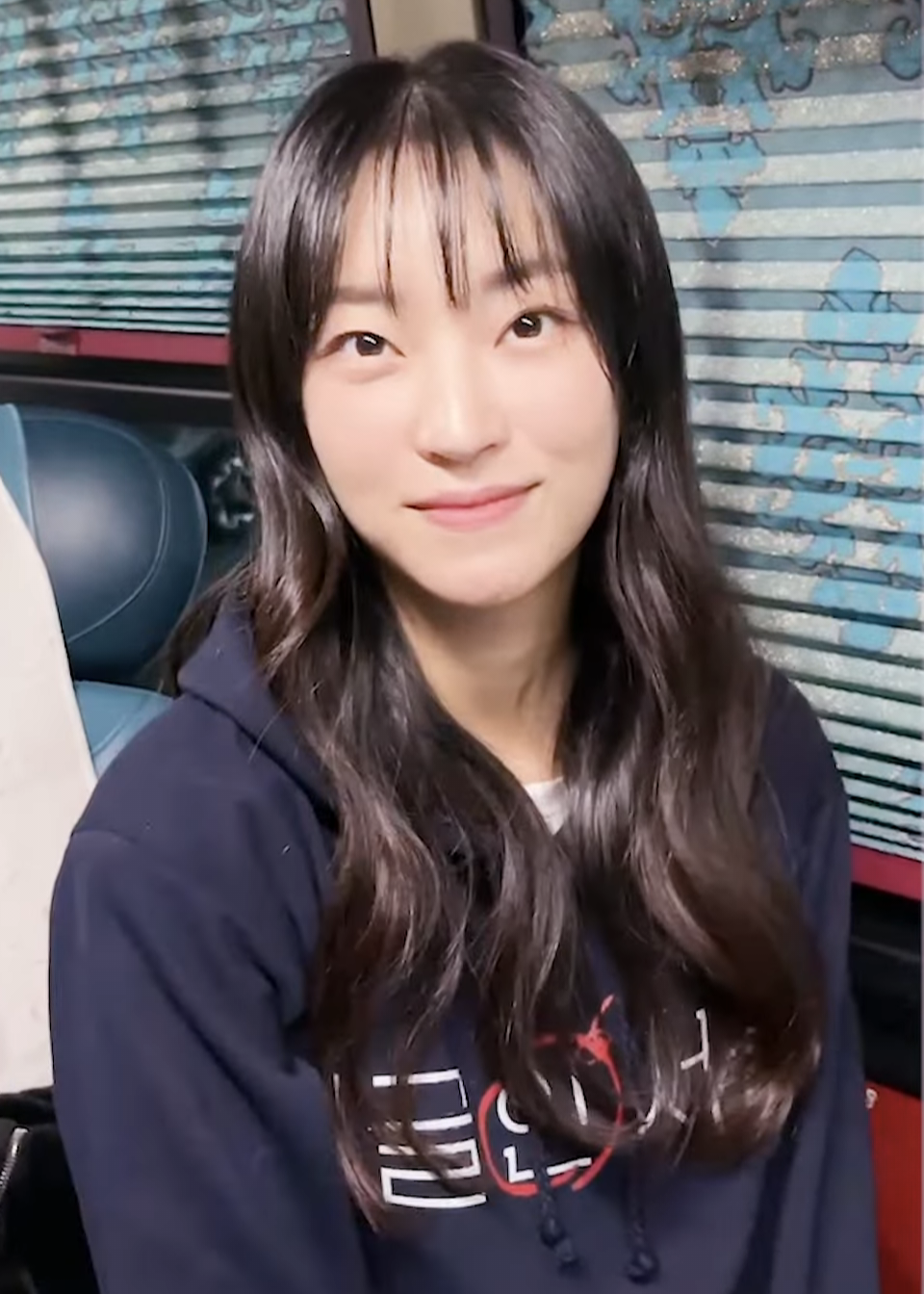
- Ji in 2023
- Born: Park Ji-soo; 26 October 1991 (age 34); Jeolla, South Korea
- Other name: Ji E-suu
- Occupations: Actress; model
- Years active: 2015–present
- Agent: Pan Star Company

Ji Yi-soo (Korean: 지이수; born 26 October 1991) is a South Korean actress and model. She is best known for her roles in dramas such as Woman with a Suitcase, Solomon's Perjury and When the Camellia Blooms.

== Biography and career ==
She was born on October 26, 1991, in Jeolla. She joined Pan Star Company as model and she made her debut as an actress in 2015 in drama Unkind Women on KBS2. She was noted for her performance in drama Dear My Friends as Sang-sook. She then appeared in several more dramas such as The Doctors, Solomon's Perjury and When the Camellia Blooms. She also appeared in movies such as Cheer Up, Mr. Lee and Diva.

== Filmography ==
=== Television series ===
Year	Title	Role	Ref.
2015	Unkind Ladies	Jae-gyeong	
2016	The Unusual Family	Lee Sa-ra	
2016	Dear My Friends	Sang-sook	
2016	The Doctors	Nurse Yoo-byeol	
2016	Woman with a Suitcase	Baek Jin-seok	
2016	Solomon's Perjury	Homeroom Teacher	
2018	Login to You	Han-tei	
2019	My Fellow Citizens!	Detective Na	
2019	When the Camellia Blooms	Jessica / Park Sang-mi	
2021	Mad for Each Other	Hwi-oh's ex-fiancé	
2022	Sponsor	Park Da-som	
2023	The Killing Vote	Drunk driver	
2024	Marry You	Oh In-ah	

=== Film ===
Year	Title	Role	Ref.
2019	Cheer Up, Mr. Lee	Ji-an	
2020	Diva	Lee Yeong's agency representative	
2020	Spirit: The Beginning of Fear	Han-joo	
2022	Yaksha: Ruthless Operations	Hye-jin	
2023	Single in Seoul	Ye-ri	
2024	Victory	Hyundai Jungang High School cheerleader	
