= DinDin =

South Korean rapper and entertainer (born 1991)

- 딘딘
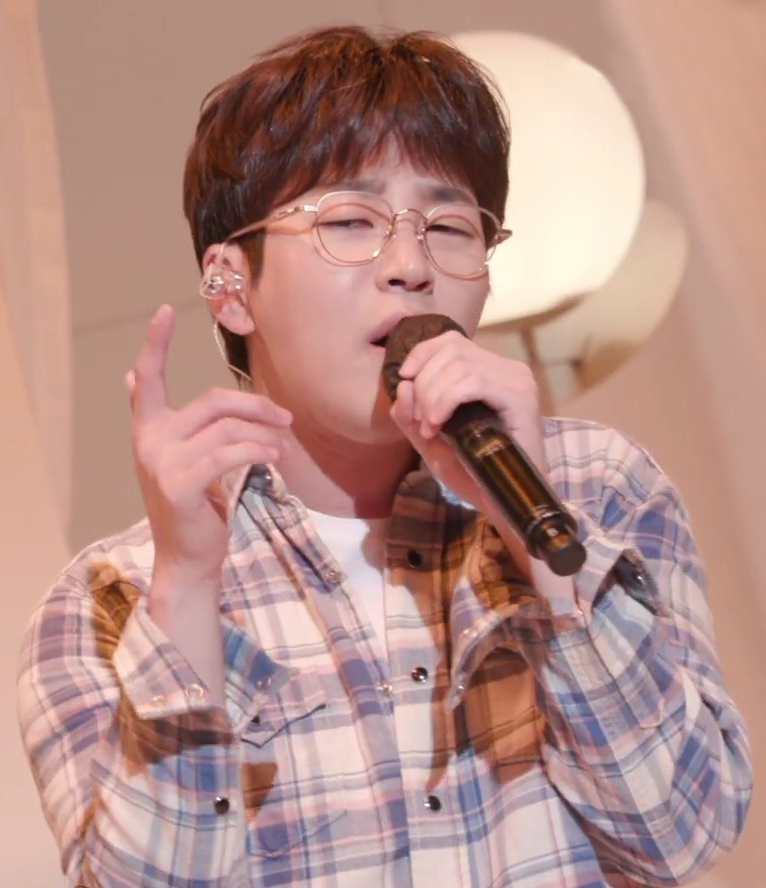
- DinDin in 2021
- Born: Lim Cheol; November 20, 1991 (age 34); Seoul, South Korea
- Occupations: Rapper; singer; actor; comedian; producer; television personality; radio personality
- Musical career
- Genre: Hip hop
- Instrument: Vocals
- Years active: 2013–present
- Label: Superbell Company

Korean name
- Hangul: 임철
- Hanja: 林哲
- RR: Im Cheol
- MR: Im Ch'ŏl

Lim Cheol (Korean: 임철; born November 20, 1991), better known by his stage name DinDin (딘딘), is a South Korean rapper, singer, actor, comedian, producer, television personality and radio personality. He made his debut in the entertainment world in 2013 when he appeared as a contestant on Show me the Money 2. Since then, he has released numerous non-album singles, contributed to quite a few television drama soundtracks, and continued to make appearances on various reality programs, including Dunia: Into a New World (2018) and Yo~! Welcome to Korea! (2019) and has been a cast member of the variety show 2 Days & 1 Night Season 4 since 2019. In June 2023, Dindin has signed an exclusive contract with Superbell Company.

== Philanthropy ==
On February 8, 2023, Dindin donated 10 million won to help in the 2023 Turkey–Syria earthquakes through Korean Red Cross. On December 31, Dindin donated 10 million won to the Korean Red Cross to support young adults preparing for independence.

== Discography ==
=== Studio albums ===
Title	Details	Peak chart positions
Title	Details	KOR
Goodbye My Twenties	Released: November 20, 2019; Label: Sobius; Formats: CD, digital download	56

=== Extended plays ===
Title	Details	Peak chart positions
Title	Details	KOR
Little Waves	Released: November 19, 2021; Label: Sobius; Formats: CD, digital download	58

=== Singles ===
Title	Year	Peak chart positions	Sales (DL)	Album
Title	Year	KOR	Sales (DL)	Album
"Rain Sunshine (Be Happy)" (비 햇빛) (with Lee Bo-ram)	2013	—	—N/a	Non-album single
"Only Gonna Hold Your Hand" (손만 잡을게) (with Minah)	2014	51	KOR: 73,081+	4U Project
"Show Me the Money 3" (with Lee Hyun-do, Soul Dive, Swings, Joosuc, Loco, Jin Doggae)	2014	—	—N/a	Non-album singles
"No Limits" (feat. Mayson The Soul)	2014	—	—N/a	Non-album singles
"New Leader" (feat. Guyu Jeong)	2015	—	—N/a	Non-album singles
"Pour" (들이부어)	2015	—	—N/a	Non-album singles
"Not Enough" (네가 보여) (feat. JUNIK)	2016	—	—N/a	Non-album singles
"100 Days Prayer" (백일기도) (with Lee Ji-hye & Jang Seok-hyun & Yeon-yeon)	2016	—	—N/a	Idol Vocal League – Girl Spirit Episode 07
"Slow Letter" (느린 편지) (비 햇빛) (feat.B.O.)	2016	95	KOR: 23,565+	Non-album singles
"Saxophone Magic" (with Park Myeong-su, Danny Jung feat. Yoo Jae-hwan & Chow Hee)	2017	—	—N/a	Non-album singles
"Super Super Lonely" (외로워서 죽음)	2017	99	KOR: 21,815+	Non-album singles
"My Sofy" (쏘피한결)	2017	—	—N/a	Non-album singles
"#Drive" (#드라이브) (feat. Yoo Yeon-jung)	2017	—	—N/a	Non-album singles
"All Day" (온 종일) (feat. Sik-K & JUNIK)	2018	—	—N/a	Non-album singles
"Alone"	2018	—	—N/a	Non-album singles
"Insomnia" (불면증) (feat. Lee Hong-gi)	2018	—	—N/a	Non-album singles
"DinDin Is DinDin" (딘딘은 딘딘) (feat. Hanhae & Greg)	2018	—	—N/a	Non-album singles
"Tear Drops" (주르륵) (feat. Wheein of Mamamoo)	2019	— (Note: "It's Okay" did not enter Gaon Digital Chart, but peaked 155 position on the Gaon Download Chart.)	—N/a	Non-album singles
"Malibu" (feat. Gray)	2019	—	—N/a	Goodbye My Twenties
"Soom" (숨) (feat. Sandeul)	2019	—	—N/a	Goodbye My Twenties
"Paradise" (feat. Stella Jang)	2019	—	—N/a	Goodbye My Twenties
"Liar" (생각보다 괜찮지 않아) (feat. Lyn)	2019	—	—N/a	Goodbye My Twenties
"Fallin' Down" (feat. Lee Won-seok of Daybreak)	2019	—	—N/a	Goodbye My Twenties
"Do Do Do Do (Prod.Giriboy)" (돼버릴거야) (feat. Wheein of Mamamoo)	2020	—	—N/a	Non-album singles
"The Sun" (with Eden)	2020	—	—N/a	Non-album singles
"Should Not Love You" (널 사랑하면 안돼)	2020	—	—N/a	A New Decade
"Walking" (걷는중) (feat. Soyou)	2020	—	—N/a	Non-album single
"Can't Fall in Love Again" (더는 사랑 못 할 거예요)	2021	—	—N/a	Little Waves
"I Should Not Have Loved You" (사랑하지 말걸 그랬나 봐요) (with Min Kyung-hoon)	2021	—	—N/a	Little Waves
"I'm Not Myself When I'm Around You" (이러면 안 될 거 아는데 너 앞에만 서면 나락) (feat 10cm)	2021	92	—N/a	Little Waves
"To You" (너에게) (feat. Jeong Se-woon)	2021	— (Note: "To You" did not enter Gaon Digital Chart, but peaked 129 position on the Gaon Download Chart.)	—N/a	Little Waves
"Slowly"	2021	—	—N/a	Little Waves
"Should Not Love You" (널 사랑하면 안돼) Part.2	2022	—	—N/a	Non-album singles
"Like the Day It Rained" (비 내리던 그날처럼) (feat. Yoon Myung)	2022	—	—N/a	Non-album singles
"Logout" (로그아웃)	2023	—	—N/a	Non-album singles
"Life4Cuts" (인생네컷) (feat. Leellamarz)	2023	—	—N/a	Non-album singles
"Love, But Not Like This" (이런 사랑 하지 마세요) (feat. Tei)	2023	—	—N/a	Non-album singles
"Foolin' Myself" (속는 중이야)	2023	—	—N/a	Non-album singles
"Cried" (이런 사랑 하지 마세요) (feat. Jung Seung-hwan)	2023	—	—N/a	Non-album singles
"—" denotes releases that did not chart or were not released in that region.

=== Featured singles ===
Title	Year	Peak chart positions	Sales (DL)	Album
Title	Year	KOR Gaon	Sales (DL)	Album
"Emotion" (비 햇빛) (2LSON Feat. Crybaby & DinDin)	2013	95	KOR: 31,435+	Non-album singles
"So Hard" (Yena Feat. DinDin)	2013	—	—N/a	Non-album singles
"A Snowy Day" (눈이 오는 날엔) (NS Yoon-G Feat. DinDin)	2014	70	KOR: 21,986+	Non-album singles
"Farewell Warning " (이별주의) (Lady Jane Feat. DinDin)	2016	—	—N/a	Non-album singles
"—" denotes releases that did not chart or were not released in that region.

=== Soundtrack appearances ===
Title	Year	Peak chart positions	Album
Title	Year	KOR Gaon	Album
"PotatoStar 2013QR3" (feat. Linzy of Fiestar)	2013	—	Potato Star 2013QR3 OST Pt 1
"Do It" (DinDin with Hea Rang)	2015	—	Last OST Part 5
"Memories" (feat. Ahn Hyeon Jeong)	2015	—	Cheo Yong 2 OST Part 2
"You Look Pretty" (feat. Juniel)	2016	—	Beautiful Gong Shim OST
"Sweety" (with Lee Ji-hye, Jang Seok-hyun and Bomi)	2016	—	Two Yoo Project Sugar Man OST Part 33
"Bottoms Up" (나발불어) (with Cheon Myeong Hun, Lee Se-young & Joo Woojae)	2016	—	Event King OST
"It's the Freestyle" (with Ash-B)	2016	—	Freestyle 2 OST
"Expressing Affections" (애정표현)	2017	—	King of Mask Singer Episode 95 OST
"Must be the Money"	2017	—	Chief Kim OST Part 1
"The Package" (with Kim Na-young)	2017	—	The Package OST
"Blue" (Shannon) feat. DinDin	2018	—	Dunia: Into a New World OST Part 3
"Not You Your Sister" (너말고 니언니) (with K.Will)	2018	—	Two Yoo Project Sugar Man 2 OST Part 16
"Is it love" (사랑일까) (with Soyeon of Laboum)	2019	—	My Strange Hero OST Part 6
"Whistle" (휘파람) (with Noel)	2019	—	The Call 2 Project No. 2 OST
"Lonely" (with Soyou & Hangzoo)	2019	—	The Call 2 Project No. 3 OST
"Rockstar" (with Muzie & N.Flying)	2019	—	The Call 2 Project No. 4 OST
"Check it Right Now" (재껴라) (with UV, Noel & N.Flying)	2019	—	The Call 2 Final Project OST
"Keep Going"	2021	—	Mr. Queen OST Part 5
"3! 4!" (with Soya)	2021	—	Hello, Me! OST Part 3
"You're the One" (너뿐이야)	2021	—	The Playlist OST Part 6
"Straight" (직진)	2021	—	Dali & Cocky Prince OST Part 2
"Get in Line" (줄서)	2022	—	One Dollar Lawyer OST Part 1
"—" denotes releases that did not chart or were not released in that region.

=== Other appearances ===
Title	Year	Peak chart positions	Sales (DL)	Album
Title	Year	KOR Gaon	Sales (DL)	Album
"The Weak Man" (약한 남자) (Joosuc, Swings, Dok2 & DinDin)	2014	—	—N/a	DEUX 20th ANNIVERSARY TRIBUTE ALBUM
"Let Me Know" (말만해) (MOONSHINE ft. DinDin)	2015	—	—N/a	Time 2 Shine
"Problem Girl" (2LSON feat Na Kyung-won & DinDin)	2015	—	—N/a	1 Year
"Foxy Girl" (Ryeowook ft. DinDin)	2016	189	KOR: 12,799+	The Little Prince
"Dokdori" (독도리) (Park Myeong-su & DinDin feat. Mad Clown)	2016	—	—N/a	Infinite Challenge Great Heritage
"Go Away" (The Nod feat. DinDin & Jang Hye-jin)	2016	—	—N/a	The Nod X D.O
"Singstreetmas" (싱스트리트마스) (Lee Sang Min & DinDin)	2016	—	—N/a	Singstreet
"KileE and dinE" (DinDin & Kim Kiri feat. MUZIE)	2017	—	—N/a	Tribe of Hiphop2 Final II
"April" (사월) (DIA feat. DinDin)	2017	—	—N/a	YOLO
"Are You in Love?" (사랑하는 사람 있나요?) (Navi feat. DinDin)	2017	—	—N/a	+Load More
"Love Is...(3+3=0)" (with Turbo, Park Seul-Ki, Lee Hong Gi, DinDin, Sleepy, Jessi & Shannon Williams)	2017	—	—N/a	Fantastic Duo 2, Pt. 13
"Which jazz bar" (어느 째즈바) (Turbo, Lee Hong Gi, DinDin, Sleepy & Jessi)	2017	—	—N/a	Fantastic Duo 2, Pt. 13
"Bonfire" (모닥불) (Lee Hong Gi feat. DinDin)	2018	—	—N/a	Do n Do
"—" denotes releases that did not chart or were not released in that region.

=== Song produced ===
Title	Year	Peak chart positions	Sales (DL)	Album
Title	Year	KOR Gaon	Sales (DL)	Album
"Hanryang" (한량) (Kim Hee-chul, Min Kyung-hoon ft. Bibi (prod. DinDin)	2020	190	—N/a	Non-album singles
"Santa Brothers!" (산타형!) (Sung Won-ee (prod. and ft. DinDin)	2020	—	—N/a	Non-album singles
"—" denotes releases that did not chart or were not released in that region.

== Filmography ==
=== Television series ===
Year	Title	Role	Notes	Ref.
2018	Queen of Mystery 2	MC J Bang Jae-soon	Supporting	

=== Television show ===
Year	Title	Role	Notes	Ref.
2013	Show Me the Money 2	Contestant		
2015	Catch Music If You Can	Cast		
2015–2016	My Money Partner: The CEO of Next Door	Cast		
2015–2016	Real Men Season 2	Cast	Episodes 137–145	
2016	I Can See Your Voice	Panelist	Season 3: Episodes 5, 8, 10, 12	
2016	Tribe of Hip Hop	Cast		
2016	Vocal War: God's Voice	Panelist	Episodes 15–16	
2017	King of Mask Singer	Contestant	as "Bitter Shine and Your Story" (Episode 95)	
2017	Fantastic Duo Season 2	Panelist		
2017	Battle Trip	Contestant	Episode 39 with Seo Kyung-deok and Yoo Jae-hwan	
2017	Battle Trip	Special MC	Episodes 58–61	
2017	Let's Eat Dinner Together	Cameo	Episode 19	
2017	Living Together in Empty Room	Cast	with Lim Ju-eun and HIGHLIGHT's Yoon Doo-joon (Episodes 20–22)	
2017	Sherlock's Room	Cast		
2017–2021	Welcome, First Time in Korea?	Host		
2018	Dunia: Into a New World	Cast		
2018	Not the Same Person You Used to Know	Host		
2019	Na Na Land	Co-host	Episodes 1–8, alongside Haha and Lee Yong-jin	
2019	TMI News	Cast		
2019	Not the Same Person You Used to Know V2	Host		
2019–present	2 Days & 1 Night Season 4	Cast	Episode 1 - present	
2021	Phone Cleansing	Host	with Yoo In-na and Yoon Jong-shin	
2021	Up Grademyself	MC		
2021	Family Register Mate	Host		
2021–present	Celebeauty S3	MC		
2021–present	The Museum of Lives	MC		
2022–2023	Family Register Mate	Host	Reguler Program	
2022	The Backpacker Chef	Host	with Baek Jong-won, Ahn Bo-hyun and Oh Dae-hwan	
2022	Don't Be Me Heart	Host	with Jo Hyun-young	
2022	Avatar Singer	Judge		
2022	Kick the Number	Host	with Kim Jong-kook	

=== Web show ===
Year	Title	Role	Notes	Ref.
2016	Love Battle	Cast		
2021	NegoKing 3	Host	with Sleepy	
2022	DinDin & Yoo Hee-Kwan! 'Members	Host		
2022	Good Life Plan Season 2	Host	with Roh Ji-sun of Fromis 9	
2023	Zombie Verse	Cast Member		
2023	Idol Challenge: Another Class	Host	Season 3	

=== Radio programs ===
Year	Title	Role	Notes	Ref.
2019	Brother's Radio	Radio DJ	with Kim Sang-hyuk	
2020–present	DinDin's Music High	Radio DJ		

== Awards and nominations ==
Name of the award ceremony, year presented, category, nominee of the award, and the result of the nomination
Award ceremony	Year	Category	Nominee / Work	Result	Ref.
Asia Artist Awards	2023	Best Choice	Dindin	Won	
Brand of the Year Awards	2022	Multitainer-Men	Dindin	Won	
KBS Entertainment Awards	2020	Excellence Award in Show/Variety Category	2 Days & 1 Night Season 4	Won	
KBS Entertainment Awards	2021	Top Excellence Award in Show/Variety Category	2 Days & 1 Night Season 4	Nominated	
KBS Entertainment Awards	2022	Top Excellence Award in Show/Variety Category	2 Days & 1 Night Season 4	Won	
KBS Entertainment Awards	2023	Entertainer of the Year (shared with other cast members)	2 Days & 1 Night Season 4	Won	
KBS Entertainment Awards	2023	Grand Prize (Daesang) (shared with other cast members)	2 Days & 1 Night Season 4	Won	
Korea Drama Awards	2017	Best OST Award	Good Manager ("Must Be the Money")	Won	
SBS Entertainment Awards	2023	Radio DJ Award – PowerFM	DinDin's Music High	Won	
