= Sponsor (TV series) =

2021 South Korean television series

- Promotional poster
- Also known as: Desire
- Genre: Drama; Thriller; Romance; Revenge
- Created by: iHQ
- Written by: Han Hui-jeung; Lee Joo-hee; (formerly, Park Kye-Hyung)
- Directed by: Lee Cheol (formerly, Kwak Ki-won)
- Music by: Hong Seung-hyun (Fara Effect)
- Country of origin: South Korea
- Original language: Korean
- No. of episodes: 12

Production
- Executive producers: Park Jong-jin; Heo Hwan; Jeong Jin-yong
- Producer: Choi Jae-Soon
- Running time: 55 minute
- Production company: Victory Contents

Original release
- Network: iHQ Drama, MBN
- Release: February 23 – April 6, 2022

Sponsor (Korean: 스폰서) is a 2022 South Korean television series starring Lee Ji-hoon, Han Chae-young, Ji Yi-soo and Koo Ja-Sung. The drama is described as another Penthouse. It was scheduled to premiere on iHQ on November 29, 2021 but postponed to February 2022 with a plan to simultaneous air on MBN along with iHQ. It premiered on MBN simultaneously with iHQ from February 23, 2022.

== Synopsis ==
A romance thriller between four men and women running like a runaway locomotive toward different desires, including success, revenge, children and love.

== Cast ==
=== Main ===
- Lee Ji-hoon as Lee Sun-woo
- Han Chae-young as Han Chae-rin
- Ji Yi-soo as Park Da-som
- Koo Ja-sung as Hyun Seung-hoon

=== Supporting ===
- Kim Yoon-seo as Hyun Sung-gi, Seung-hun's older sister.
- Kim Kang-hyun as Kang-hyun
- Park Geun-hyung as President Park
- Kim Jung-tae as David Park
- Lee Yoon-mi as Joo-ah, David Park's ex-wife and store representative.
- Han Seul
- Kim Hee-jung as Park Da-hye the younger sister of Park Da-som and an employee of the beauty product development team.
- Jung Min-kyu as Han Yu-min, Han Chae-rin's younger brother
- Jo Hyo-in as Joo Young-chan, ambitious model

=== Special appearance ===
- Park Joon-geum as President Lee
- Eru as Michael

== Production ==
=== Development ===
- Originally, the series title was Desire, but the title was changed to Sponsor as the director was changed from PD Kwak Ki-won to PD Lee Cheol. The writer was also changed to Han Hui-Jeung.
- President Park Jong-jin told iHQ, "The series is very realistic because it is based on a true story.
- The drama is the first project of the new channel.

== Ratings ==
Average TV viewership ratings (nationwide)
Ep.	Original broadcast date	Average audience share (Nielsen Korea)
1	February 23, 2022	1.2%
2	February 24, 2022	1.4%
3	March 2, 2022	1.1%
4	March 3, 2022	1.2%
5	March 10, 2022	1.2%
6	March 16, 2022	0.9%
7	March 17, 2022	0.9%
8	March 23, 2022	0.5%
9	March 24, 2022	1.2%
10	March 30, 2022	0.5%
11	March 30, 2022	0.9%
12	April 6, 2022	0.931%
In the table above, the blue numbers represent the lowest ratings and the red numbers represent the highest ratings.; This drama airs on a cable channel/pay TV which normally has a relatively smaller audience compared to free-to-air TV/public broadcasters (KBS, SBS, MBC and EBS).
