= Don Spike =

- Born: Kim Min-su; January 24, 1977 (age 49); South Korea
- Occupations: Singer; composer
- Spouse: Sung Ha-yoon (m. 2022)
- Musical career
- Genre: K-pop

Korean name
- Hangul: 김민수
- RR: Gim Minsu
- MR: Kim Minsu

Kim Min-su (Korean: 김민수; born January 24, 1977), better known by his stage name Don Spike (돈스파이크) is a South Korean singer, composer and entertainer.

== Personal life ==
=== Relationships ===
In May 2022, it was reported that Don Spike would hold a wedding with his girlfriend on June 4, 2022.

=== Drug use allegations ===
On September 27, 2022, Don Spike was arrested due to test resulted in a positive test for narcotics of using methamphetamine. According to news reports, the Nowon Police Station in Seoul had arrested Don Spike at around 8 pm on the 26th at a hotel in Gangnam, Seoul.

== Discography ==
=== Singles ===
Title	Year	Peak chart positions	Sales	Album
Title	Year	KOR	Sales	Album
"Hello" with Naul	2011	16	KOR: 818,149+	Non-album singles
"Always" with Lena Park	2014	—	—N/a	Non-album singles

=== As producer ===
Title	Year	Artist	Album
"Miracles in December"	2013	Exo	Miracles in December (EP)

== Filmography ==
=== Television ===
Year	Program	Network	Role	Notes/Ref.
2013	Radio Star	MBC	Guest (ep. 334)	
2013	Hidden Singer	JTBC	Celebrity panelist	Episode airing October 19, 2013
2015	Animals	MBC	Cast	Segment 'A dog went to kindergarten'
2015	King of Mask Singer	MBC	Celebrity panelist (episodes 1-2)	
2015	Healing Camp, Aren't You Happy	SBS	Guest (ep. 186-187)	Gourmet Camp
2015 - 2016	Real Man	MBC	Cast	June 8, 2015 - February 14, 2016
2015 - 2016	Two Yoo Project Sugar Man	JTBC	Producer (ep. 5, 6, 9, 12, 16, 21, 27, 34)	
2016	Vitamin	KBS	Featured guest (non-fixed) (ep. 623)	
2016	Vitamin	KBS	Featured guest (non-fixed) (ep. 638)	
2016	I Can See Your Voice	Mnet	Tone-deaf Detective Team member (season 3; ep. 7-8)	
2017	Secretly Greatly	MBC	Special appearance (ep. 8)	
2017	My Little Old Boy	SBS	Guest (ep. 38, 40–41, 44, 50, 53, 58)	
2017	Video Star	MBC Every 1	Guest (ep. 53)	
2018	Wizard of Nowhere	MBC	Cast (regular; ep. 20-31)	
2018	Baek Jong-won's Alley Restaurant	SBS	Guest (ep. 6–10)	
2018	Radio Star	MBC	Guest (ep. 562)	
2018	Please Take Care of My Refrigerator	JTBC	Guest (ep. 175-177)	
2018	Dunia: Into a New World	MBC	Cast (ep. 2-13)	
2018	Unexpected Q	MBC	Guest (ep. 11)	Team Hyunmoo
2018	Visiting Tutor	Mnet	Tutor (Social Science)	Appears in episodes 2, 4, 7, 8, 10
2018	Unexpected Q	MBC	Guest (ep. 18)	Team Seyoon
2018	Unexpected Q	MBC	Guest (ep. 19)	Team Seyoon-Hyunmoo
2018	Law of the Jungle	SBS	Member (ep. 334-339)	
2018	Under Nineteen	MBC	Special director/guest	
2019	Happy Together	KBS2	Guest (ep. 573/season 4 ep. 16)	
2019	Knowing Bros	JTBC	Guest (ep. 164)	
2019	Knowing Bros	JTBC	Guest (ep. 165)	Seollal Special
2019	I Can See Your Voice	Mnet	Tone-deaf Detective Team member (season 6 ep. 3, 5)	
2019	Law of the Jungle	SBS	Member (ep. 353-357)	
2019	The Return of Superman	KBS2	Guest (ep. 275)	
2019	Why Did You Come To My House	skyDrama, Channel A	House owner (ep. 4)	
2019	Hello Counselor	KBS2	Guest	Episode airing July 1, 2019
2019	Radio Star	MBC	Guest (ep. 634)	
2019	Not the Same Person You Used to Know	Mnet	Protagonist (ep. 6)	
2019	Queendom	Mnet	Special appearance (vocal mentor)	
2019	Battle Trip	KBS2	Trip planner (ep. 162)	Participated with his mother
2019	My Little Television V2	MBC	Cast (ep. 34-35)	Broadcast Title: "Meat Party"
2019	Stars' Top Recipe at Fun-Staurant	KBS2	Cast/chef (ep. 5-7)	Won the 2nd round of competition with 'Don's Pie' which could be bought in CU convenience stores nationwide for ₩3600
2021	Cooking - The Birth of a Cooking King	JTBC	contestant	

=== Web shows ===
Year	Title	Role	Ref.
2022	The Stripped Guys	Host	
