= Dunia: Into a New World =

South Korean television program

- Hangul: 두니아 ~ 처음 만난 세계
- RR: Dunia ~ cheoeum mannan segye
- MR: Tunia ~ ch'ŏŭm mannan segye
- Genre: Variety show; Drama; Science fiction
- Starring: Various Cast
- Country of origin: South Korea
- Original language: Korean
- No. of seasons: 1
- No. of episodes: 15

Production
- Producers: Park Jin-kyung; Lee Jae-seok; Kwon Sung-min
- Production locations: South Korea; Japan
- Camera setup: Multi-camera
- Running time: 70 minutes
- Production company: MBC

Original release
- Network: MBC
- Release: 3 June – 23 September 2018

Dunia: Into a New World (Korean: 두니아 - 처음 만난 세계; RR: Dunia - cheoeum mannan segye) is a South Korean television entertainment program starring Yunho, Jung Hye-sung, Luda (Cosmic Girls), Kwon Hyun-bin, Sam Okyere, Don Spike, Koo Ja-sung, Hansel, Austin Kang, and DinDin. Season 1 aired on MBC Sundays at 18:45 (KST), beginning on 3 June and ended on 23 September 2018.

Dunia: Into a New World is dubbed as an "unreal variety show" because of its unconventional format, which follows a plot and incorporates scripted scenarios acted by the cast members. It is based on and is connected to Durango: Wild Lands, a massively multiplayer online role-playing game (MMORPG) created by Nexon.

== Format ==
The 10 cast members are trapped in a virtual world called Dunia and must find a way to survive using the items they have brought with them when they were transported to the island. In each episode, the show allows its viewers to decide what the cast must do in a certain situation by voting real-time through text messaging, which lasts for one minute.

Although the tasks and situations that the cast members encounter around Dunia are created by the producers, the way they handle each situation is unscripted, with the show indicating onscreen when they are acting on their own and when they are following a script. As with many video games, the show makes use of cutscenes when a major event happens.

== Cast ==
=== Season 1 ===
Name	Episode	Notes
Yunho (TVXQ)	1 – 6, 9 – 15	
Sam Okyere	1 – 15	
Jung Hye-sung	1 – 15	
Luda (WJSN)	1 – 15	
Kwon Hyun-bin	1 – 15	
Don Spike	2 – 13	
Koo Ja-sung	2 – 9	
Hansel	2 – 15	
Austin Kang	2 – 15	
DinDin	2 – 15	
Joon Park (g.o.d)	6 – 15	
Mijoo (Lovelyz)	7 – 15	

== Episodes ==
=== Season 1 ===
Ep. #	Original Airdate	Note(s)
1	3 June 2018	Yunho, Sam, Hye-sung, Hyun-bin & Luda appear in this episode.
2	10 June 2018	Don Spike, Koo Ja-sung, Hansel, Austin Kang, and DinDin appear in this episode. Seo Yu-ri guest stars as K, an NPC in Durango: Wild Lands.
3	17 June 2018	
4	24 June 2018	
5	1 July 2018	
6	8 July 2018	Joon Park appears in this episode
7	15 July 2018	Mijoo appears in this episode
8	22 July 2018	
9	29 July 2018	
10	5 August 2018	
11	12 August 2018	
-	No broadcast on 19 August and 26 August due to 2018 Asian Games live telecast.	
12	2 September 2018	
13	9 September 2018	
14	16 September 2018	
15	23 September 2018	Last episode of Season 1

== Original soundtrack ==
=== CD 1 ===
No.	Title	Artist	Length
1.	"Blue Spring"	Ailee	4.12
2.	"Dreamland"	Luda	4.50
3.	"Blue"	Shannon Williams (ft. Din Din)	3.31
4.	"Blue Spring" (Inst.)	Ailee	4.12
5.	"Dreamland" (Inst.)	Luda	3.31
6.	"Blue" (Inst.)	Shannon Williams (ft. Din Din)	4.47
Total length:			25.06

=== CD 2 ===
No.	Title	Artist	Length
1.	"The Unknown World"	EASTWEST	1.24
2.	"Monment Of Choice1 (Anxious)"	EASTWEST	1.21
3.	"Monment Of Choice2 (Serious)"	EASTWEST	2.01
4.	"Monment Of Choice3 (common)"	EASTWEST	2.12
5.	"Monment Of Choice4 (Low tension)"	EASTWEST	1.55
6.	"Constancy"	EASTWEST	0.57
7.	"Passion"	EASTWEST	2.05
8.	"Subtle relationship"	EASTWEST	0.49
9.	"Chaos"	EASTWEST	0.57
10.	"Conflict"	EASTWEST	1.05
11.	"Fracture"	EASTWEST	1.06
12.	"Strange"	EASTWEST	1.43
13.	"Appearance"	EASTWEST	1.17
14.	"Run"	EASTWEST	1.33
15.	"Together"	EASTWEST	1.43
16.	"Remember"	EASTWEST	1.49
17.	"Special one"	EASTWEST	1.23
18.	"Trust"	EASTWEST	1.31
19.	"Nervous night"	EASTWEST	1.10
20.	"Peaceful"	EASTWEST	1.56
21.	"Wonderwall"	EASTWEST	1.28
22.	"Challenge"	EASTWEST	1.12
23.	"Run away"	EASTWEST	0.54
24.	"Gold candy"	EASTWEST	1.05
25.	"Dilemma"	EASTWEST	0.54
26.	"Clown's fart"	EASTWEST	0.45
27.	"Playful"	EASTWEST	1.35
28.	"Salt and Pepper"	EASTWEST	0.46
29.	"Daily Life"	EASTWEST	0.41
30.	"Feeling"	EASTWEST	1.06
31.	"Romance"	EASTWEST	1.11
32.	"Minty Bathroom"	EASTWEST	0.48
33.	"Chatter"	EASTWEST	0.52
34.	"Amused"	EASTWEST	1.08
35.	"The Spring of Hope"	EASTWEST	1.41
Total length:			61.33

== Ratings ==
In the ratings below, the highest rating for the show will be in red, and the lowest rating for the show will be in blue.

=== Season 1 ===
2018
Ep. #	Original Airdate	AGB Nielsen (Nationwide)
1	3 June	3.5%
2	10 June	3.7%
3	17 June	2.8%
4	24 June	2.7%
5	1 July	2.3%
6	8 July	2.3%
7	15 July	2.6%
8	22 July	2.5%
9	29 July	1.7%
10	5 August	2.1%
11	12 August	1.9%
12	2 September	1.9%
13	9 September	2.4%
14	16 September	1.8%
15	23 September	1.9%

== Awards and nominations ==
Year	Award	Category	Recipients	Result
2018	18th MBC Entertainment Awards	Excellence Award in Variety Category	Jung Hye-sung	Nominated
2018	18th MBC Entertainment Awards	Rookie Award in Variety Category	Luda	Nominated
