= Visiting Tutor =

South Korean television program

- Genre: Reality; Education
- Presented by: Park Myeong-su; Kim Sung-joo; San E
- Starring: Don Spike; Microdot; Vernon (Seventeen); Luda (Cosmic Girls); Hongseok (Pentagon); Yoo Byung-jae; Lee Dae-hwi (Wanna One); Im Young-min (MXM)
- Country of origin: South Korea
- Original language: Korean
- No. of seasons: 1
- No. of episodes: 10

Production
- Production location: South Korea
- Running time: 75 minutes

Original release
- Network: Mnet
- Release: August 23 – October 25, 2018

Visiting Tutor (Korean: 방문교사) is a South Korean television program that airs on Mnet.

The program will become a regular program starting from December.

== Program ==
The program opened applications for students or parents of their children, who want to take up 1-to-1 tuition from the home tutors recruited by the program. The home tutors will then visit the homes of the picked registrants and conduct 1-to-1 tuition, while at the same time giving life lessons and advice. Upon completion of their first lessons, for the next lessons tests will be conducted, and if the students do not score more than 90 marks, the home tutors will end their provisions of tuition to the students.

The hosts and studio guests watch the ways the tutors conduct their lessons in the studio and provide some commentaries about their ways of teaching.

== Host ==
- Park Myeong-su
- Kim Sung-joo
- San E
- Kim Eun-young (Vice-principal of a tuition academy) (Fixed studio guest)

== Tutors ==
| Name | Subject(s) offered |
|---|---|
| Vernon (Seventeen) | English language, Korean language |
| Microdot | English language, Mathematics |
| Hongseok (Pentagon) | Chinese |
| Don Spike | Social science |
| Luda (Cosmic Girls) | Natural science, Mathematics |
| Yoo Byung-jae | Mathematics |
| Lee Dae-hwi (Wanna One, AB6IX) | English language, Korean language |
| Im Young-min (MXM) | Hanja |

== Episodes ==
| Episode # | Broadcast Date | Studio Guests | Appeared Tutors | Note(s) |
|---|---|---|---|---|
| 1 | August 23, 2018 | Park Ji-sun (Comedian) fromis 9 (Park Ji-won, Lee Na-gyung); Samuel | Vernon, Microdot, Hongseok | Special appearances by Pentagon's Yeo One and Yan An |
| 2 | August 30, 2018 | Park Ji-sun (Comedian) fromis 9 (Park Ji-won, Lee Na-gyung); Samuel | Don Spike, Hongseok, Vernon | |
| 3 | September 6, 2018 | Kim So-young (Announcer); Cosmic Girls (Eunseo, Dayoung); Sanha (Astro) | Luda, Vernon, Microdot | |
| 4 | September 13, 2018 | Song Kyung-ah (Model); Cosmic Girls (Eunseo, Dayoung); Jeong Se-woon | Microdot, Don Spike, Luda | |
| 5 | September 20, 2018 | Choi Eun-kyung (Broadcaster, actress); Pentagon (Hongseok, Kino); Nayoung (Pristin) | Microdot, Vernon, Hongseok, Luda | |
| 6 | September 27, 2018 | Yoon Yoo-sun; Microdot; Solbin (Laboum); Ravi (VIXX) (Arrives later in the show) | Yoo Byung-jae, Microdot, Luda | Special appearances by Cosmic Girls |
| 7 | October 4, 2018 | Yoon Yoo-sun; Microdot; Solbin (Laboum); Ravi (VIXX) (Arrives later in the show) | Yoo Byung-jae, Microdot, Luda | |
| 7 | October 4, 2018 | Hwang Hye-young (Singer, actress); Pentagon (Hui, Hongseok); Nayoung (Pristin) | Luda, Yoo Byung-jae, Don Spike, Hongseok | |
| 8 | October 11, 2018 | Hwang Hye-young (Singer, actress); Pentagon (Hui, Hongseok); Nayoung (Pristin) | Don Spike, Lee Dae-hwi (AB6IX), Hongseok | |
| 8 | October 11, 2018 | MXM | Don Spike, Lee Dae-hwi (AB6IX), Hongseok | |
| 9 | October 18, 2018 | Yoo Seon-ho; Lee Woo-jin (The East Light) | Microdot, Lee Dae-hwi (AB6IX), Im Young-min | |
| 10 | October 25, 2018 | Seventeen (Vernon, Dino) | Microdot, Luda, Don Spike | |
