= Koo Ja-sung =

South Korean actor and model

- 구자성
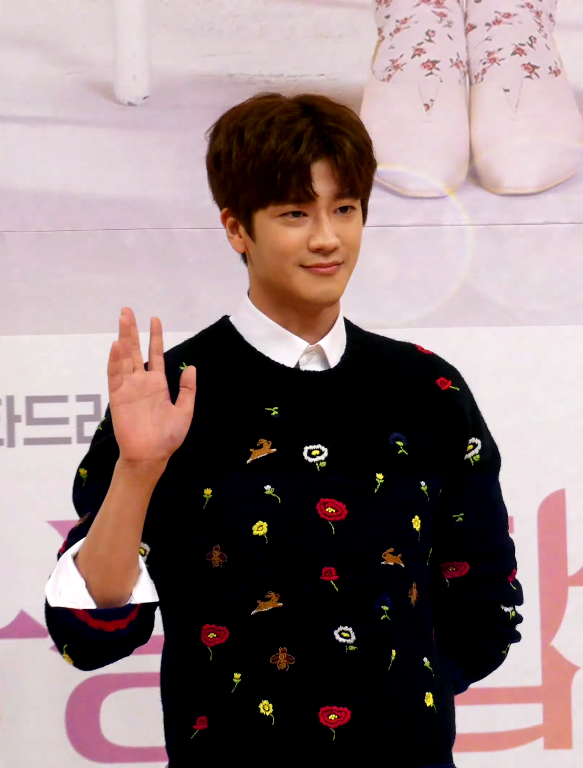
- Koo in September 2019
- Born: September 22, 1992 (age 34); South Korea
- Agent: PLK Entertainment

- Koo Ja-sung
- Hangul: 구자성
- RR: Gu Jaseong
- MR: Ku Chasŏng

Koo Ja-sung is a South Korean actor and model.

== Filmography ==
=== Television series ===
Year	Títle	Role	Notes	Ref.
2017	The Blue Sea	Seong Ki-soo		
2018	Misty	Kwak Gi-seok		
2019	The Secret Life of My Secretary	Ki Dae-joo		
2020	Was It Love?	Oh Yeon Woo		
2021	Drama Special – "Siren"	Park Dong-gyu		
2022	Sponsor	Hyun Seung-hoon		
2025	Motel California	Cha Seung-eon		

=== Film ===
Year	Title	Role	Notes
2007	Milky Way Liberation Front		

=== Variety shows ===
Year	Show	Notes/Ref.
2018	Dunia: Into A New World	(ep. #2-9) - member
