= The Secret Life of My Secretary =

2019 South Korean TV series

- Promotional poster
- Also known as: How to Train My Blind Boss
- Hangul: 초면에 사랑합니다
- Lit.: I Loved You from the Beginning
- RR: Chomyeone saranghamnida
- MR: Ch'omyŏne saranghamnida
- Genre: Romantic comedy
- Created by: Park Young-soo
- Written by: Kim Ah-jung
- Directed by: Lee Kwang-young
- Starring: Kim Young-kwang; Jin Ki-joo; Kim Jae-kyung; Koo Ja-sung
- Country of origin: South Korea
- Original language: Korean
- No. of episodes: 32 (Note: In order to circumvent Korean laws that prevent commercial breaks in the middle of an episode, what would previously have been aired as single 70 minute episodes are now being repackaged as two 35 minute episodes, with two episodes being shown each night with a commercial break between the two.)

Production
- Executive producer: Jung Ah-reum
- Production location: South Korea
- Running time: 35 minutes
- Production company: Beyond J

Original release
- Network: SBS TV
- Release: May 6 – June 25, 2019

The Secret Life of My Secretary (Korean: 초면에 사랑합니다) is a 2019 South Korean television series starring Kim Young-kwang, Jin Ki-joo, Kim Jae-kyung and Koo Ja-sung. It aired from May 6 to June 25, 2019.

== Synopsis ==
A department manager of a mobile media company is getting to know who are his real friends and foes after losing his ability to recognize faces (prosopagnosia, where damage to the temporal lobe can lead to "face-blindness") due to an attack on him. He teams up with his secretary to try and solve the mystery and in the process falls in love with the secretary. His face-blindess is essential to the plot.

== Cast ==
=== Main ===
- Kim Young-kwang as Do Min-ik

Director of T&T Mobile Media 1. An intelligent, demanding, yet a needy and problematic boss who calls his secretary for everything.

- Jin Ki-joo as Jung Gal-hee

Secretary to T&T Mobile Media 1 Director Do Min-ik. An obedient, lively secretary who has a harsh way of talking.

- Kim Jae-kyung as Veronica Park

CEO of film production company Cinepark and heiress of the Park Group. She boasts excellence in her work but has an audacious personality and a messy personal life.

- Koo Ja-sung as Ki Dae-joo

Director of T&T Mobile Media 2. Best friend of Do Min-ik. He is capable of stealing hearts with his talent as well as his gentle and sweet personality. He is the love interest of Veronica Park.

=== Supporting ===
==== People around Do Min-ik ====
- Kim Min-sang as Sim Hae-yong, Min-ik's uncle who is the CEO of T&T Mobile
- Jung Ae-ri as Sim Hae-ra, Min-ik's mother who is the Chairman of T&T Art Centre
- Kim Byung-chun as Goo Seok-chan, Min-ik's doctor; neurosurgeon at Sangmo Hospital
- Choi Tae-hwan as Eun Jung-soo, Min-ik's chauffeur

==== Jung Gal-hee's family ====
- Seo Dong-won as Jung Joong-hee, Gal-hee's older brother
- Kim Ji-min as Jung Nam-hee, Gal-hee's younger sister
- Kim Hee-jung as Go Si-rye, Gal-hee's mother

==== People at T&T Mobile ====
- Jang So-yeon as Lee Eul-wang, secretary to T&T Mobile Media 2 Director Ki Dae-joo
- Han Ji-sun as Mo Ha-ni, secretary to T&T Mobile's CEO Sim Hae-yong
- Son San as Goo Myung-jung, secretary at T&T Mobile
- Choi Yoon-ra as Boo Se-young, secretary at T&T Mobile
- Kwon So-hyun as Ha Ri-ra, secretary at T&T Mobile
- Lee Seung-hyung as Director Park, one of T&T Mobile's external directors supporting Sim Hae-yong
- Kim Kyeong-ryong as Director Lee, one of T&T Mobile's external directors supporting Sim Hae-yong
- Kwon Hong-suk as Director Kim, one of T&T Mobile's external directors supporting Sim Hae-yong

==== Others ====
- Baek Hyun-joo as Park Seok-ja, Veronica's mother
- Jo Jae-ryeong as Uhm Han-il, detective at Yeongdeungpo Police Station
- Song Jin-woo as Woo Doo-han, detective at Yeongdeungpo Police Station

=== Special appearances ===
- Lee Moon-sik as doctor Goo Seok-chan's face that Do Min-ik saw wrong (ep. 2)
- Kim Jung-pal as doctor Goo Seok-chan's face that Do Min-ik saw wrong (ep. 2)
- Kim Ki-doo as doctor Goo Seok-chan's face that Do Min-ik saw wrong (ep. 2)
- Kim Kwang-kyu as director at Gal-hee's interview (ep. 3)
- Bae Hae-sun as Dr. Park (ep. 8)
- Oh Young-sil as cleaner (ep. 14)
- Woo Hyun as man in sauna (ep. 16)
- Choi Jung-woo as Do Wan-bae, Min-ik's father (ep. 25)

== Original soundtrack ==
The Secret Life of My Secretary OST

Soundtrack album
- Released: July 1, 2019
- Genre: Soundtrack
- Language: Korean
- Labels: Music Buddy; VLending

Disc 1
No.	Title	Artist	Length
1.	"FOOL"	Peppertones	3:48
2.	"Fly High" (날아올라)	Sandeul	4:31
3.	"Maddening" (미치게)	Lim Han-byul	4:13
4.	"Tell Me You Love Me" (사랑을 말해요)	Sondia	3:31
5.	"To Say Sorry" (미안하다는 말)	Car, the Garden	5:07
6.	"So Strange" (이상해 정말)	1415	4:43
7.	"Walk" (산책)	Ko Young-bae, Fromm, Louie (Geeks)	3:01
8.	"Sunny Day"	Stella Jang	3:16
9.	"Start From Now On" (지금부터 시작해)	Park Ji-won (Fromis 9), Lee Na-gyung (Fromis 9)	3:54
10.	"What Are You Doing Now" (뭐해, 지금)	YEGNY	3:38
11.	"Dance With Me"	Linus' Blanket	3:17
12.	"FOOL" (Inst.)	Peppertones	3:48
13.	"Fly High" (Inst.)	Sandeul	4:31
14.	"Maddening" (Inst.)	Lim Han-byul	4:13
15.	"Tell Me You Love Me" (Inst.)	Sondia	3:31
16.	"To Say Sorry" (Inst.)	Car, the Garden	5:07
17.	"So Strange" (Inst.)	1415	4:43
18.	"Walk" (Inst.)	Ko Young-bae, Fromm, Louie (Geeks)	3:01
19.	"Sunny Day" (Inst.)	Stella Jang	3:16
20.	"Start From Now On" (Inst.)	Park Ji-won (Fromis 9), Lee Na-gyung (Fromis 9)	3:54
21.	"What Are You Doing Now" (Inst.)	YEGNY	3:38
22.	"Dance With Me" (Inst.)	Linus' Blanket	3:17
Total length:			85:59

Disc 2
No.	Title	Artist	Length
1.	"Love Point"	Various Artists	1:48
2.	"Too Much Work"	Various Artists	1:49
3.	"The Quarrel Of Lovers"	Various Artists	1:46
4.	"Sweety Girls"	Various Artists	1:41
5.	"Small Wave"	Various Artists	1:47
6.	"Ugly Mans"	Various Artists	1:40
7.	"Slow Motion"	Various Artists	2:38
8.	"Rabbit Step"	Various Artists	1:40
9.	"Prosopagnosia"	Various Artists	1:47
10.	"Patience Is A Virtue"	Various Artists	2:05
11.	"Out Of Control"	Various Artists	1:56
12.	"One Life"	Various Artists	2:08
13.	"Nothing Of Right Now"	Various Artists	1:19
14.	"Nice And Easy"	Various Artists	2:16
15.	"New Steps"	Various Artists	2:07
16.	"New Kind Of A Man"	Various Artists	1:08
17.	"Mistake Of Secretary"	Various Artists	1:47
18.	"Memory Box"	Various Artists	3:22
19.	"Lullaby"	Various Artists	2:19
20.	"Light On Me"	Various Artists	1:53
21.	"Mom I Hate Peanuts"	Various Artists	2:31
22.	"Her Dream"	Various Artists	2:41
23.	"Dream Zone"	Various Artists	2:27
24.	"Did You Call Me?"	Various Artists	1:48
25.	"Above The Road"	Various Artists	2:12
26.	"Be My Eyes"	Various Artists	1:57
27.	"Close To Your Mind"	Various Artists	2:05
28.	"Day Of Secretary"	Various Artists	1:28
29.	"Another Day"	Various Artists	1:31
30.	"Confidence Coat"	Various Artists	3:00
31.	"Around Me"	Various Artists	2:03
32.	"Crunch"	Various Artists	3:55
33.	"My Little Room"	Various Artists	2:03
34.	"Only Red Cardigan"	Various Artists	1:54
Total length:			70:31

OST Part 1–11

=== Part 1 ===
Released on May 6, 2019
No.	Title	Lyrics	Music	Artist	Length
1.	"Sunny Day"	Stella Jang	GLEAM; Stella Jang	Stella Jang	3:16
2.	"Sunny Day" (Inst.)		GLEAM; Stella Jang		3:16
Total length:					6:32

=== Part 2 ===
Released on May 7, 2019
No.	Title	Lyrics	Music	Artist	Length
1.	"FOOL"	Peppertones	Peppertones	Peppertones	3:48
2.	"FOOL" (Inst.)		Peppertones		3:48
Total length:					7:36

=== Part 3 ===
Released on May 13, 2019
No.	Title	Lyrics	Music	Artist	Length
1.	"Fly High" (날아올라)	LYn	J-Yoon	Sandeul	4:31
2.	"Fly High" (Inst.)		Sandeul		4:31
Total length:					9:02

=== Part 4 ===
Released on May 14, 2019
No.	Title	Lyrics	Music	Artist	Length
1.	"To Say Sorry" (미안하다는 말)	Car, the Garden; Yura	Car, the Garden; Kim Min Soo	Car, the Garden	5:07
2.	"To Say Sorry" (Inst.)		Car, the Garden; Kim Min Soo		5:07
Total length:					10:14

=== Part 5 ===
Released on May 20, 2019
No.	Title	Lyrics	Music	Artist	Length
1.	"Walk" (산책)	Kim Young-ah	CYoon Hyunseong	Ko Young-bae, Fromm, Louie (Geeks)	3:01
2.	"To Say Sorry" (Inst.)		CYoon Hyunseong		3:01
Total length:					6:02

=== Part 6 ===
Released on May 21, 2019
No.	Title	Lyrics	Music	Artist	Length
1.	"Start From Now On" (지금부터 시작해)	Han June; Park Sei Joon	Lee Yoo-jin; Park Sei Joon	Park Ji-won (Fromis 9), Lee Na-gyung (Fromis 9)	3:54
2.	"Start From Now On" (Inst.)		Lee Yoo-jin; Park Sei Joon		3:54
Total length:					7:48

=== Part 7 ===
Released on May 27, 2019
No.	Title	Lyrics	Music	Artist	Length
1.	"So Strange" (이상해 정말)	Han June; Park Sei Joon	MACKELLI	1415	4:43
2.	"So Strange" (Inst.)		MACKELLI		4:43
Total length:					9:26

=== Part 8 ===
Released on May 28, 2019
No.	Title	Lyrics	Music	Artist	Length
1.	"Dance With Me"	Yeonjin	Yeonjin	Linus' Blanket	3:17
2.	"Dance With Me" (Inst.)		Yeonjin		3:17
Total length:					6:34

=== Part 9 ===
Released on June 3, 2019
No.	Title	Lyrics	Music	Artist	Length
1.	"What Are You Doing Now" (뭐해, 지금)	Han June; Park Sei Joon	Lee Yoo-jin; Park Sei Joon	YEGNY	3:38
2.	"What Are You Doing Now" (Inst.)		Lee Yoo-jin; Park Sei Joon		3:38
Total length:					7:16

=== Part 10 ===
Released on June 17, 2019
No.	Title	Lyrics	Music	Artist	Length
1.	"Maddening" (미치게)	Jin Minho; Da Hong	Jin Minho; Da Hong	Lim Han-byul	4:13
2.	"Maddening" (Inst.)		Jin Minho; Da Hong		4:13
Total length:					8:26

=== Part 11 ===
Released on June 24, 2019
No.	Title	Lyrics	Music	Artist	Length
1.	"Tell Me You Love Me" (사랑을 말해요)	Han Kyungsoo@ArtMatic; Choi Han-sol	Han Kyungsoo@ArtMatic; Choi Han-sol	Sondia	3:31
2.	"Tell Me You Love Me" (Inst.)		Han Kyungsoo@ArtMatic; Choi Han-sol		3:31
Total length:					7:02

== Ratings ==
In this table, the blue numbers represent the lowest ratings and the red numbers represent the highest ratings.

Ep.	Original broadcast date	Title	Average audience share
Ep.	Original broadcast date	Title	AGB Nielsen
Ep.	Original broadcast date	Title	Nationwide
1	May 6, 2019	Secretary Jung, Please Save Me (정비서 나 좀 살려줘)	3.2%
2	May 6, 2019	Secretary Jung, Please Save Me (정비서 나 좀 살려줘)	3.6%
3	May 7, 2019	Congratulations, You Came Back to Me (축하해요 나한테 돌아온 거)	3.4%
4	May 7, 2019	Congratulations, You Came Back to Me (축하해요 나한테 돌아온 거)	3.2%
5	May 13, 2019	Hello, Stranger	3.1%
6	May 13, 2019	Hello, Stranger	3.1%
7	May 14, 2019	I Wanted to Draw a Face, but I Unconsciously Drew a Circle (얼굴 그리려다 무심코 그린 동그라미)	3.0%
8	May 14, 2019	I Wanted to Draw a Face, but I Unconsciously Drew a Circle (얼굴 그리려다 무심코 그린 동그라미)	3.5%
9	May 20, 2019	When Adam Opens His Eyes (아담이 눈뜰 때)	3.0%
10	May 20, 2019	When Adam Opens His Eyes (아담이 눈뜰 때)	3.4%
11	May 21, 2019	Eve's Confession (이브의 고백)	2.7%
12	May 21, 2019	Eve's Confession (이브의 고백)	3.6%
13	May 27, 2019	When I First Saw You (내가 너를 처음 봤을 때)	2.8%
14	May 27, 2019	When I First Saw You (내가 너를 처음 봤을 때)	3.5%
15	May 28, 2019	My Premonition Never Goes Wrong (예감은 틀리지 않는다)	3.0%
16	May 28, 2019	My Premonition Never Goes Wrong (예감은 틀리지 않는다)	3.0%
17	June 3, 2019	Your Face (너의 얼굴은)	3.1%
18	June 3, 2019	Your Face (너의 얼굴은)	3.7%
19	June 4, 2019	Veronica's Double Life (베로니카의 이중생활)	3.2%
20	June 4, 2019	Veronica's Double Life (베로니카의 이중생활)	4.0%
21	June 10, 2019	A Love Triangle Between Two (둘이서 삼각관계)	2.7%
22	June 10, 2019	A Love Triangle Between Two (둘이서 삼각관계)	3.4%
23	June 11, 2019	Because of Dishonesty (솔직하지 못해서)	3.0%
24	June 11, 2019	Because of Dishonesty (솔직하지 못해서)	4.0%
25	June 17, 2019	A Secret That Cannot Be Told (말할 수 없는 비밀)	3.0%
26	June 17, 2019	A Secret That Cannot Be Told (말할 수 없는 비밀)	3.8%
27	June 18, 2019	Secretary for One Day (하루 동안의 비서)	3.4%
28	June 18, 2019	Secretary for One Day (하루 동안의 비서)	4.2%
29	June 24, 2019	For the Employee from the Boss (갑이 을에게)	2.8%
30	June 24, 2019	For the Employee from the Boss (갑이 을에게)	3.1%
31	June 25, 2019	This Very Moment (지금 이 순간)	3.9%
32	June 25, 2019	This Very Moment (지금 이 순간)	4.6%
Average			3.3%

== Awards and nominations ==
Year	Award	Category	Nominee	Result	Ref.
2019	2019 SBS Drama Awards	Top Excellence Award, Actor in a Miniseries	Kim Young-kwang	Nominated	
2019	2019 SBS Drama Awards	Excellence Award, Actress in a Miniseries	Jin Ki-joo	Nominated	
2019	2019 SBS Drama Awards	Best Supporting Actress	Kim Jae-kyung	Nominated	
