= Miracles in December (song) =

2013 single by Exo

Single by Exo

from the EP Miracles in December
- Language: Korean; Mandarin
- Released: December 4, 2013
- Recorded: 2013
- Studio: Ocean Way Nashville (Nashville); doobdoob Studio (Seoul)
- Genre: K-pop
- Length: 4:34
- Label: SM; KT Music
- Composers: Andreas Stone Johansson; Ricky Hanley
- Lyricists: Sarah Yoon; Liu Yuan
- Producer: Don Spike

Exo singles chronology
"Growl" (2013)	"Miracles in December" (2013)	"Overdose" (2014)

Music video
- "Miracles in December" (Korean Ver.) on YouTube "Miracles in December" (Chinese Ver.) on YouTube

"Miracles in December" (Korean: 12월의 기적; RR: Sibiworui Gijeok; Chinese: 十二月的奇迹; pinyin: Shí'èryuè de Qíjī) is a song by South Korean–Chinese boy band Exo, released on December 4, 2013, as the lead single of their second extended play Miracles in December. It was released in both Korean and Chinese versions by their label SM Entertainment.

== Background and release ==
Produced by Don Spike, "Miracles in December" according to the description of the album on the site of Korean music Naver Music is a described as a "pop-ballad" song that uses the piano and strings in the arrangement. The song was written by composers veterans Andreas Stone Johansson and Ricky Hanley, in collaboration with Korean lyricist Sarah Yoon and Chinese lyricist Liu Yuan. The song talks about a man who recalls with nostalgia the relationship with his former girlfriend and his desire to return to it, but cannot do so because of the shame and guilt. The Korean version of the song is recorded by D.O., Baekhyun and Chen, and the Chinese version is recorded by Luhan, Chen and Baekhyun.

== Music video ==
On December 4, 2013 both versions of the videos were announced, at 8:00pm (KST) and were released on video-sharing websites. The music video was directed by Jo Soo-hyun, and was filmed in November in Paju, Gyeonggi in a study in Ilsan.

== Promotion and live performance ==
In December, D.O., Baekhyun and Chen began their promotions for the Korean version of the song on Korean music shows, including M Countdown on December 5, Music Bank on December 6, Show! Music Core on December 7 and Inkigayo on December 8. In the following week's promotions, S.M. informed that Luhan and Lay also participate in presentations. Baekhyun, Chen and D.O. appeared on the stage of MTV's The Show on December 17 and Show Champion on December 18. The song was also included in the set-list of the winter festival of the group with his classmates seal f(x) SM Town Week: Christmas Wonderland on 23 and 24 December. The Chinese version of "Miracles in December" was acted in the MTV The Show on December 24, 2013 with the members D.O., Luhan, Baekhyun, Chen and Lay.

== Reception ==
The song debuted at number two on Gaon Digital Chart, at number three on Korea K-Pop Hot 100, and at number three on Billboard's US World Digital Songs chart.

== Awards ==
Music program awards
Program	Date
Show! Music Core	December 14, 2013
Show! Music Core	December 21, 2013
Inkigayo	December 15, 2013
Inkigayo	December 22, 2013
Show Champion	December 18, 2013
M Countdown	December 19, 2013
M Countdown	December 26, 2013
M Countdown	January 2, 2014
Music Bank	December 20, 2013

== Credits and personnel ==
Credits adapted from EP's liner notes.

=== Studio ===
- doobdoob Studio – recording
- Ocean Way Nashville Studio – strings recording
- SM Concert Hall Studio – mixing
- Sonic Korea – mastering

=== Personnel ===
- SM Entertainment – executive producer
- Lee Soo-man – producer
- Kim Young-min – executive supervisor
- Exo (Lu Han, Baekhyun, Chen, D.O.) – vocals
- Sarah Yoon – Korean lyrics
- Liu Yuan – Chinese lyrics
- Andreas Stone Johansson – composition
- Ricky Hanley – composition
- Don Spike – arrangement, piano
- Lee Ju-hyung – vocal directing, additional vocal editing
- Nashville Recording Orchestra – strings
- Kim Kun – strings arrangement
- Kim Hyun-gon – recording, digital editing
- Kim Kyu-young – recording
- Kim Dae-woo – strings recording
- Nam Koong-jin – mixing
- Jeon Hoon – mastering

== Charts ==
=== Weekly charts ===
Chart (2013)	Peak position
South Korea (Gaon)	2
South Korea (K-pop Hot 100)	3
US World Digital Songs (Billboard)	3

=== Monthly charts ===
Chart (2013)	Peak position
South Korea (Gaon)	2

== Sales ==
Region	Sales
South Korea (Gaon)	789,317

== Release history ==
Release history for "Miracles in December"
Region	Date	Format	Label
Various	December 4, 2013	Digital download; streaming	SM; KT Music
