= Bloo (rapper) =

South Korean rapper

- Also known as: Daniel
- Born: Kim Hyeon-ung; October 12, 1994 (age 32)
- Origin: La Crescenta, California, United States
- Genre: Hip hop
- Occupation: Rapper
- Years active: 2015–present
- Label: MKIT RAIN
- Website: Official website

Korean name
- Hangul: 김현웅
- RR: Gim Hyeonung
- MR: Kim Hyŏnung

Kim Hyeon-ung (Korean: 김현웅; born 1994), better known as Bloo (Korean: 블루), is a rapper based in South Korea. He has released 3 full-length albums: Bloo in Wonderland 2 (2021), Moon and Back (2021) and Fox and the City (2023) as well as the extended plays Downtown Baby (2017), Bloo in Wonderland (2018), and It's Not Love I'm Just Drunk (2019).

His 2017 single, "Downtown Baby," topped South Korean music charts in June 2020, after singer Lee Hyori performed it on the variety show Hangout With Yoo.

== Discography ==
=== Studio album ===
Title	Album details	Peak chart positions	Sales
Title	Album details	KOR	Sales
Bloo in Wonderland 2	Released: June 17, 2021; Label: Mkit Rain; Formats: CD, digital download	31	KOR: 6,200
Moon and Back	Released: October 28, 2021; Label: Uncutpoint; Formats: CD, digital download	23	KOR: 5,000

=== Extended plays ===
Title	Album details	Peak chart positions	Sales
Title	Album details	KOR	Sales
Downtown Baby	Released: December 6, 2017; Label: MKIT RAIN; Formats: LP, CD, digital download	38	
Bloo in Wonderland	Released: November 19, 2018; Label: MKIT RAIN; Formats: CD, digital download	39	KOR: 1,117
It's Not Love I'm Just Drunk	Released: September 25, 2019; Label: MKIT RAIN; Formats: CD, digital download	47	

=== Singles ===
Title	Year	Peak chart positions	Album
Title	Year	KOR	Album
As lead artist
"Drive Thru"	2016	—	Non-album singles
"Better"	2017	—	Non-album singles
"Hennessy"	2017	—	Non-album singles
"Downtown Baby"	2017	1	Downtown Baby
"Drink Slow Henny"	2018	—	Non-album singles
"So Rude" (싸가지)	2018	—	Non-album singles
"Take Me" (데려가) feat. Nafla	2018	—	Bloo in Wonderland
"I'm the One"	2018	—	Bloo in Wonderland
"boyfromthemoon" (달의아이)	2019	—	It's Not Love I'm Just Drunk
"Haru Achim" (하루아침)	2019	—	It's Not Love I'm Just Drunk
"When I smoke" (내가 담배 태울 때)	2020	—	Non-album single
"Drama"	2021	—	Bloo in Wonderland 2
"Bloo Story"	2021	—	Bloo in Wonderland 2
"Come and Kiss Me"	2021	—	Bloo in Wonderland 2
Collaborations
"Weathermen" with Loopy, Nafla, Owen Ovadoz, as MKIT RAIN	2016	—	Non-album single
"BJ" with Niahn, as Neonblue	2017	—	Henny and Jamie
"You and I" with Niahn, as Neonblue	2017	—	Henny and Jamie
"Don't Move" with Loopy, Nafla, Young West, as MKIT RAIN	2018	—	Public Enemy
"Public Enemy" (공공의 적) with Loopy, Nafla, Owen Ovadoz, Young West, as MKIT RAIN	2018	—	Public Enemy
"NBA" with Loopy, Nafla	2019	—	Non-album singles
"Candle" (캔들) with Xbf	2019	—	Non-album singles
"Businessmen" with Owen Ovadoz, as Mkit Rain	2020	—	Non-album singles
"—" denotes release did not chart.
