= WJMK (group) =

South Korean girl group

- Origin: Seoul, South Korea
- Genres: K-pop
- Years active: 2018
- Labels: Starship; Fantagio
- Members: Seola; Luda; Yoojung; Doyeon

WJMK (Korean: 우주미키; short for Wuju Meki) was a four-member special project unit group between Cosmic Girls and Weki Meki created by Starship Entertainment and Fantagio Music. It is composed of four members: Seola, Luda, Yoojung and Doyeon.

== History ==
=== 2018: Debut with "Strong" ===
On May 2, 2018, Starship Entertainment and Fantagio Music announced the special formation of the project unit and released teaser images online. Promotional images were released throughout the month with bright color concepts. On June 1, their digital single "Strong" was released along with its music video.

== Members ==
- Seola (설아)
- Luda (루다)
- Choi Yoo-jung (최유정)
- Kim Do-yeon (김도연)

== Discography ==
=== Singles ===
| Title | Year | Peak chart positions | Album |
| Title | Year | KOR | Album |
|---|---|---|---|
| "Strong (짜릿하게)" | 2018 | — | Non-album single |
"—" denotes releases that did not chart or were not released in that region.

== Videography ==
=== Music videos ===
| Year | Title | Director(s) | Ref. |
|---|---|---|---|
| 2018 | "Strong" (짜릿하게) | Zanybros | |
