= List of Make Mate 1 contestants =

Make Mate 1 (also known as MA1) is a South Korean reality competition show, where 36 multinational contestants are competing to debut in a six to seven-member project boy group. After the final episode, the final seven contestants were selected to debut as members of Nouera.

== Contestants ==
The English names of contestants are presented in Eastern order in accordance with the official website.

Final members of Nouera
Round Top Mate
Top Mate A (Live Stage)
Top Mate B (Live Stage)
Top Rank Mate (Online Voting)
Eliminated on Round 1
Eliminated on Round 2
Saved by Mate Pass
Eliminated on the Final Round
Left the show

Contestants	0	ROUND 1							ROUND 2			ROUND 3		FINAL ROUND	
Contestants	0	2	3	4	5		6		7	8		9		10	
Contestants	Pre-bias Voting	Online Vote Rank	Live Votes Rank	Online Vote Rank	Round 1 Raw Points (Note: Fan Mate (40%) = Online Favorite Vote + Live Audience Score) (Note: Online Vote = Local (50%) + International (50%))	Rank	Total Points (Note: Fan Mate (40%) + C Mate Score (60%) + Benefits)	Round 1 Rank	Online Vote Rank	Round 2 Rank	Total Points (Note: Fan Mate (40%) + C Mate Score (60%) + Benefits)	Round 3 Rank	Total Points (Note: Fan Mate (40%) + C Mate Score (60%) + Benefits)	Total Points (Note: Fan Mate (40%) + C Mate Score (60%) + Benefits)	Final Rank
Aki Torngern Thongngiu (ต่อเงิน ทองงิ้ว)	27	15	27	27	4930	30	5876	34	Eliminated						34
An Xin (周安信)	6	6	21	9	6053	14	7274	15	9	9	8264	11	7969	Eliminated	14
Chen Bingfan (陈炳帆)	2	2	3	1	8500	1	11134	1	1	2	9768	2	9482	9020	1
Chen Shiau Fu (陳孝輔)	5	14	36	6	4715	34	5887	33	Eliminated						33
Choi Han-gyeol (최한결)	14	26	4	11	4733	33	6246	28	Eliminated						28
Choi Min-jun (최민준)	30	31	30	33	5597	22	6475	24	24	14	7468	Eliminated			19
Han Yu-seop (한유섭)	10	11	26	7	6609	8	7960	11	6	7	8471	3	8891	5757	7
Jang Hyun-jun (정현준)	8	13	7	14	8208	2	9593	2	14	1	9810	13	7836	6131	4
Jia Hao (张家豪)	11	5	12	5	5835	17	7143	19	2	15	7344	1	10422	Eliminated	10
Jeon Jun-pyo (전준표)	9	21	13	15	6553	10	8000	10	4	4	9193	8	8177	5862	6
Jeong Hyeon-uk (정현욱)	28	19	24	35	5946	15	6786	21	17	20	6869	10	8103	Eliminated	12
Jo Jae-hyeon (조재현)	35	27	15	32	4938	29	6009	30	Eliminated						30
Jo Min-jae (조민재)	33	7	1	4	6850	6	8429	6	7	6	8676	7	8333	Eliminated	15
Jo Seung-hyeon (조승현)	32	16	22	34	4940	28	5905	32	Eliminated						32
Jung Hyun-jun (정현준)	12	4	2	16	6778	7	8149	8	16	16	7275	6	8638	Eliminated	9
Jung Jae-yong (정재영)	34	29	29	28	6175	13	7183	18	20	23	Saved	Eliminated			22
Kai (카이)	19	12	35	26	4827	32	5833	35	Eliminated						35
Ki Hyeong-jun (기형준)	20	20	33	23	4875	31	6233	29	Eliminated						29
Kim Hak-seong (김학성)	21	25	32	13	5016	26	6484	23	8	11	7720	14	7329	Eliminated	13
Kim Se-gon (김세곤)	36	(36)	25	Left the Show											36
Kim Seung-ho 06 (김승호)	18	22	31	18	5875	16	7320	14	21	21	6451	Left the Show			24
Kim Seung-ho 07 (김승호)	17	17	5	25	7114	4	8473	5	23	18	7196	Eliminated			20
Kim Si-on (김시온)	4	3	11	3	6591	9	8699	3	18	19	7078	9	8106	Eliminated	8
Kim Sun-yub (김선엽)	26	18	28	30	5288	24	6302	27	Eliminated						27
Lee Do-ha (이도하)	23	34	20	10	4972	27	6603	22	10	25	Eliminated				25
Lee Jang-hee (이장희)	31	35	34	31	5397	23	6467	25	15	26	Eliminated				26
Lin (林韩中)	1	1	8	2	5693	21	8523	4	3	5	9074	4	8870	8583	2
Midori (ミドリダイキ)	13	8	16	22	5129	25	6399	26	11	10	7959	Eliminated			18
Miraku (星沢 弥樂)	7	9	14	12	6456	11	7592	13	12	13	7622	12	7968	6239	3
Noh Gi-hyeon (노기현)	3	10	10	17	5773	18	7264	17	13	3	9295	16	7086	5965	5
Seo Ji-ho (서지호)	24	33	19	19	5753	19	7094	20	25	24	Saved	Eliminated			23
Seo Yun-deok (서윤덕)	15	24	9	8	5748	20	7268	16	5	12	7667	15	7117	Eliminated	16
Shin Won-cheon (신원천)	29	32	17	20	7018	5	8365	7	22	22	6440	Eliminated			21
Takuma (竹下拓馬)	16	23	23	29	7236	3	8062	9	19	17	7230	5	8834	Eliminated	11
Yoon Ho-hyeon (윤호현)	25	28	18	24	4695	35	5927	31	Eliminated						31
Yoon Jae-yong (윤재용)	22	30	6	21	6375	12	7890	12	26	8	8436	Eliminated			17

=== First Stage (Episode 1–2) ===
Color Key

Top Member of the Team
Winning Team

#	Performance		Contestant	#	Performance		Contestant
#	Team	Song	Contestant	#	Team	Song	Contestant
1	Maximum Mate Peak	INFINITE Be Mine (내꺼하자)	Choi Min-jun	5	Crazy Team Work	TEEN TOP Miss Right (긴 생머리 그녀)	An Xin
1	Maximum Mate Peak	INFINITE Be Mine (내꺼하자)	Jang Hyun-jun	5	Crazy Team Work	TEEN TOP Miss Right (긴 생머리 그녀)	Chen Shiau Fu
1	Maximum Mate Peak	INFINITE Be Mine (내꺼하자)	Jo Seung-hyeon	5	Crazy Team Work	TEEN TOP Miss Right (긴 생머리 그녀)	Kim Se-gon
1	Maximum Mate Peak	INFINITE Be Mine (내꺼하자)	Noh Gi-hyeon	5	Crazy Team Work	TEEN TOP Miss Right (긴 생머리 그녀)	Kim Sun-yub
1	Maximum Mate Peak	INFINITE Be Mine (내꺼하자)	Seo Ji-ho	6	Explosive Energy	BLOCK B Very Good	Han Yu-seop
2	Golden Maknaes	ASTRO Breathless (숨가빠)	Jung Hyun-jun	6	Explosive Energy	BLOCK B Very Good	Jia Hao
2	Golden Maknaes	ASTRO Breathless (숨가빠)	Jung Jae-yong	6	Explosive Energy	BLOCK B Very Good	Kim Hak-seong
2	Golden Maknaes	ASTRO Breathless (숨가빠)	Kim Si-on	6	Explosive Energy	BLOCK B Very Good	Seo Yun-deok
2	Golden Maknaes	ASTRO Breathless (숨가빠)	Miraku	7	Visual Team	NCT DREAM Hello Future	Chen Bingfan
3	Ace Team	EXO Growl (으르렁)	Jeon Jun-pyo	7	Visual Team	NCT DREAM Hello Future	Jeong Hyeon-uk
3	Ace Team	EXO Growl (으르렁)	Jo Min-jae	7	Visual Team	NCT DREAM Hello Future	06 Kim Seung-ho
3	Ace Team	EXO Growl (으르렁)	Lin	7	Visual Team	NCT DREAM Hello Future	Lee Jang-hee
3	Ace Team	EXO Growl (으르렁)	Shin Won-cheon	7	Visual Team	NCT DREAM Hello Future	Midori
3	Ace Team	EXO Growl (으르렁)	Takuma	8	The Weakest Team	SUPER JUNIOR U	Aki
4	Dance Babies	HIGHLIGHT Fiction	Kai	8	The Weakest Team	SUPER JUNIOR U	Choi Han-gyeol
4	Dance Babies	HIGHLIGHT Fiction	Ki Hyeong-jun	8	The Weakest Team	SUPER JUNIOR U	Jo Jae-hyeon
4	Dance Babies	HIGHLIGHT Fiction	Lee Do-ha	8	The Weakest Team	SUPER JUNIOR U	07 Kim Seung-ho
4	Dance Babies	HIGHLIGHT Fiction	Yoon Jae-yong	8	The Weakest Team	SUPER JUNIOR U	Yoon Ho-hyeon

=== Legend K-pop Mega Member Mission (Episode 3) ===
Color Key

Winning Team

TEAM A			Legend KPOP	TEAM B		
Contestants		Song	Legend KPOP	Song	Contestants	
Aki	Kai	H.O.T. We Are the Future	Legend KPOP	SHINHWA Perfect Man	Chen Shiau Fu	Kim Sun-yub
An Xin	Ki Hyeong-jun	H.O.T. We Are the Future	Legend KPOP	SHINHWA Perfect Man	Choi Min-jun	Lee Do-ha
Chen Bingfan	06 Kim Seung-ho	H.O.T. We Are the Future	Legend KPOP	SHINHWA Perfect Man	Han Yu-seop	Lee Jang-hee
Choi Han-gyeol	Kim Si-on	H.O.T. We Are the Future	Legend KPOP	SHINHWA Perfect Man	Jia Hao	Lin
Jang Hyun-jun	Seo Yun-deok	H.O.T. We Are the Future	Legend KPOP	SHINHWA Perfect Man	Jeong Hyeon-uk	Midori
Jeon Jun-pyo	Shin Won-cheon	H.O.T. We Are the Future	Legend KPOP	SHINHWA Perfect Man	Jo Seung-hyeon	Miraku
Jo Jae-hyeon	Seo Ji-ho	H.O.T. We Are the Future	Legend KPOP	SHINHWA Perfect Man	Jung Hyun-jun	Noh Gi-hyeon
Jo Min-jae	Takuma	H.O.T. We Are the Future	Legend KPOP	SHINHWA Perfect Man	Kim Hak-seong	Yoon Ho-hyeon
Jung Jae-yong	Yoon Jae-yong	H.O.T. We Are the Future	Legend KPOP	SHINHWA Perfect Man	07 Kim Seung-ho	

=== One Artist, Two Stage (Episode 4–5) ===
Color Key

Top Member of the Team
Winning Team

TEAM A			Performance			TEAM B		
Contestants	Points	Total	Song	ONE ARTIST	Song	Total	Points	Contestants
Jang Hyun-jun	749	3852	Blue Hour (5시 53분의 하늘에서 발견한 너와 나)	TOMORROW X TOGETHER	Crown (어느날 머리에서 뿔이 자랐다)	3730	495	Chen Shiau Fu
06 Kim Seung-ho	544	3852	Blue Hour (5시 53분의 하늘에서 발견한 너와 나)	TOMORROW X TOGETHER	Crown (어느날 머리에서 뿔이 자랐다)	3730	747	Jung Hyun-jun
Kim Si-on	663	3852	Blue Hour (5시 53분의 하늘에서 발견한 너와 나)	TOMORROW X TOGETHER	Crown (어느날 머리에서 뿔이 자랐다)	3730	560	Kim Sun-yub
Shin Won-cheon	687	3852	Blue Hour (5시 53분의 하늘에서 발견한 너와 나)	TOMORROW X TOGETHER	Crown (어느날 머리에서 뿔이 자랐다)	3730	552	Lee Jang-hee
Seo Ji-ho	537	3852	Blue Hour (5시 53분의 하늘에서 발견한 너와 나)	TOMORROW X TOGETHER	Crown (어느날 머리에서 뿔이 자랐다)	3730	676	Miraku
Takuma	672	3852	Blue Hour (5시 53분의 하늘에서 발견한 너와 나)	TOMORROW X TOGETHER	Crown (어느날 머리에서 뿔이 자랐다)	3730	700	Yoon Jae-yong
Aki	473	2703 Ave: 540.6	10 Out of 10 (10점 만점에 10점)	2PM	Again & Again	3264 Ave: 544	488	Choi Han-gyeol
Jo Jae-hyeon	498	2703 Ave: 540.6	10 Out of 10 (10점 만점에 10점)	2PM	Again & Again	3264 Ave: 544	691	Han Yu-seop
Kai	507	2703 Ave: 540.6	10 Out of 10 (10점 만점에 10점)	2PM	Again & Again	3264 Ave: 544	584	Jeong Hyeon-uk
Ki Hyeong-jun	522	2703 Ave: 540.6	10 Out of 10 (10점 만점에 10점)	2PM	Again & Again	3264 Ave: 544	496	Kim Hak-seong
07 Kim Seung-ho	703	2703 Ave: 540.6	10 Out of 10 (10점 만점에 10점)	2PM	Again & Again	3264 Ave: 544	535	Lee Do-ha
		2703 Ave: 540.6	10 Out of 10 (10점 만점에 10점)	2PM	Again & Again	3264 Ave: 544	470	Yoon Ho-hyeon
An Xin	584	3779	Everybody	SHINee	Sherlock	3626	601	Choi Min-jun
Chen Bingfan	797	3779	Everybody	SHINee	Sherlock	3626	630	Jia Hao
Jeon Jun-pyo	619	3779	Everybody	SHINee	Sherlock	3626	528	Jo Seung-hyeon
Jo Min-jae	660	3779	Everybody	SHINee	Sherlock	3626	647	Lin
Jung Jae-yong	579	3779	Everybody	SHINee	Sherlock	3626	565	Midori
Seo Yun-deok	540	3779	Everybody	SHINee	Sherlock	3626	655	Noh Gi-hyeon

=== Change Mission (Episode 6-7) ===
Color Key

Top Member of the Team
Winning Team

TEAM A			Performance			TEAM B		
Contestants	Points	Total	Song	CHANGE MISSION	Song	Total	Points	Contestants
Chen Bingfan	840	5071	LE SSERAFIM Unforgiven	GIRL GROUP	AESPA Black Mamba	5151	755	An Xin
Jia Hao	727	5071	LE SSERAFIM Unforgiven	GIRL GROUP	AESPA Black Mamba	5151	744	Han Yu-seop
Jeong Hyeon-uk	741	5071	LE SSERAFIM Unforgiven	GIRL GROUP	AESPA Black Mamba	5151	828	Jeon Jun-pyo
Jung Hyun-jun	786	5071	LE SSERAFIM Unforgiven	GIRL GROUP	AESPA Black Mamba	5151	636	06 Kim Seung-ho
Jung Jae-yong	604	5071	LE SSERAFIM Unforgiven	GIRL GROUP	AESPA Black Mamba	5151	719	07 Kim Seung-ho
Shin Won-cheon	706	5071	LE SSERAFIM Unforgiven	GIRL GROUP	AESPA Black Mamba	5151	724	Seo Yun-deok
Seo Ji-ho	667	5071	LE SSERAFIM Unforgiven	GIRL GROUP	AESPA Black Mamba	5151	745	Yoon Jae-yong
Kim Si-on	740	4394	G-DRAGON Crooked (삐딱하게)	SOLO	TAEYANG Ringa-Linga	4433	655	Choi Min-jun
Lee Do-ha	579	4394	G-DRAGON Crooked (삐딱하게)	SOLO	TAEYANG Ringa-Linga	4433	852	Jang Hyun-jun
Lee Jang-hee	600	4394	G-DRAGON Crooked (삐딱하게)	SOLO	TAEYANG Ringa-Linga	4433	771	Jo Min-jae
Lin	852	4394	G-DRAGON Crooked (삐딱하게)	SOLO	TAEYANG Ringa-Linga	4433	646	Kim Hak-seong
Miraku	817	4394	G-DRAGON Crooked (삐딱하게)	SOLO	TAEYANG Ringa-Linga	4433	723	Midori
Takuma	806	4394	G-DRAGON Crooked (삐딱하게)	SOLO	TAEYANG Ringa-Linga	4433	786	Noh Gi-hyeon

=== Concept Mission (Episode 8–9) ===
Color Key

Top Member of the Team
Winning Team

MATE A			CONCEPT MISSION		MATE B		
Contestants	Points	Total	CONCEPT MISSION		Total	Points	Contestants
Chen Bingfan	811	4502	BTS Boy in Luv (상남자)	STRAY KIDS Thunderous (소리꾼)	4694	828	Han Yuseop
Jang Hyun-jun	773	4502	BTS Boy in Luv (상남자)	STRAY KIDS Thunderous (소리꾼)	4694	785	Jeong Hyeon-uk
Miraku	758	4502	BTS Boy in Luv (상남자)	STRAY KIDS Thunderous (소리꾼)	4694	752	Jo Min-jae
Noh Gi-hyeon	761	4502	BTS Boy in Luv (상남자)	STRAY KIDS Thunderous (소리꾼)	4694	739	Kim Hak-seong
Seo Yun-dok	717	4502	BTS Boy in Luv (상남자)	STRAY KIDS Thunderous (소리꾼)	4694	781	Lin
Yoon Jae-yong	682	4502	BTS Boy in Luv (상남자)	STRAY KIDS Thunderous (소리꾼)	4694	809	Takuma
Jeon Jun-pyo	761	4199 Ave: 699.8	MONSTA X Love Killa	BOYNEXTDOOR But I Like You (돌아버리겠다)	3769 Ave: 753.8	815	Jung Hyun-jun
07 Kim Seung-ho	749	4199 Ave: 699.8	MONSTA X Love Killa	BOYNEXTDOOR But I Like You (돌아버리겠다)	3769 Ave: 753.8	779	Jia Hao
Shin Won-cheon	747	4199 Ave: 699.8	MONSTA X Love Killa	BOYNEXTDOOR But I Like You (돌아버리겠다)	3769 Ave: 753.8	768	Kim Si-on
Midori	676	4199 Ave: 699.8	MONSTA X Love Killa	BOYNEXTDOOR But I Like You (돌아버리겠다)	3769 Ave: 753.8	740	An Xin
Seo Ji-ho	641	4199 Ave: 699.8	MONSTA X Love Killa	BOYNEXTDOOR But I Like You (돌아버리겠다)	3769 Ave: 753.8	667	Jung Jae-young
Choi Min-jun	625	4199 Ave: 699.8	MONSTA X Love Killa	BOYNEXTDOOR But I Like You (돌아버리겠다)	3769 Ave: 753.8		

=== Final Stage (Episode 10) ===
Contestants	FINAL STAGE		Contestants
Kim Hak-seong	쿵쿵 (Make It Bounce)	Higher Wire	Chen Bingfan
Miraku	쿵쿵 (Make It Bounce)	Higher Wire	Han Yuseop
Seo Yun-dok	쿵쿵 (Make It Bounce)	Higher Wire	Noh Gi-hyeon
An Xin	쿵쿵 (Make It Bounce)	Higher Wire	Jang Hyun-jun
Jeon Jun-pyo	쿵쿵 (Make It Bounce)	Higher Wire	Jeong Hyeon-uk
Jung Hyun-jun	쿵쿵 (Make It Bounce)	Higher Wire	Jia Hao
Jo Min-jae	쿵쿵 (Make It Bounce)	Higher Wire	Takuma
Kim Si-on	쿵쿵 (Make It Bounce)	Higher Wire	Lin
