= Debut's Plan =

South Korean television program

- Hangul: 데뷔스 플랜
- RR: Debwiseu peullaen
- MR: Tebwisŭ p'ŭllaen
- Genre: Reality competition
- Created by: Starship Entertainment
- Judges: K.Will; Yoo Yeon-jung; Choi Young-jun; Kim In-gyoo; Board Members
- Opening theme: "ImPerfect"
- Country of origin: South Korea
- Original language: Korean

Production
- Executive producer: Seo Hyeon-ju
- Running time: 90 minutes
- Production companies: Starship Entertainment; Turnkey Works

Original release
- Network: YouTube
- Release: March 14 – May 4, 2025

Debut's Plan (Korean: 데뷔스 플랜) is a 2025 South Korean boy group reality competition survival show created by Starship Entertainment. It followed the process of creating their newest boy group. It premiered on March 14, 2025, and aired every Friday at 9:30 PM KST on the show's YouTube channel. (Note: Exception: Episode 1, 7, and 9 (3/17, 4/21, 5/4)) The show ended on May 4, 2025, with the formation of an eight-member boy group named Idid.

== Production and Background ==
On July 7, 2024, Starship Entertainment announced that they would launch an audition project called NewKids on the STARSHIP that would go on to form their newest boy group four years after Cravity.

On March 3, 2025, the social media accounts of the upcoming boy group NewKids were opened by Starship Entertainment. Their promotional schedule revealed that the group was going to be formed through a survival show called Debut's Plan, which was set to air on March 14, 2025.

Two performance videos were released prior to the airing of the show; "Balla" and "ImPerfect", released on March 8 and 12, 2025 respectively, with the latter being the show's theme song. The official track for "ImPerfect" was released on streaming services on March 14, 2025.

== Cast ==
- The Board (Judges)
  - Seo Hyeon-ju (Executive Producer)
  - K.Will (Artist Team, Special Trainer)
  - Yoo Yeon-jung (Vocal Trainer)
  - Choi Young-jun, Kim In-gyoo (Dance Trainers)
  - Simeez (Performance Team)
  - Shim Se-ran (Strategic Planning Team)
  - Kim Sun-mi, Kim Dongyoung (Production Team)
  - Oh Yoon-jin (New Talent Development Team)
  - Kang Sang-yoon (Visual Team)
- MCs:
  - Minhyuk (Ep. 4; Special MC)
  - Joohoney (Ep. 8-9)
- Special Trainers
  - Shownu (Ep. 0)
  - Johnny (Ep. 3)
  - Rei (Ep. 3)
  - Liz (Ep. 3, Ep. 8)
  - Soyou (Ep. 3)
  - I.M (Ep. 4)
  - Joohoney (Ep. 7)
  - Gaeul (Ep. 8)
  - Serim (Ep. 8)
  - Taeyoung (Ep. 8)
  - Dayoung (Ep. 8)

== Episodes ==
No.	Title	Original release date
0	"Debut's Plan Begins: If you survive here for 77 hours, you can debut"	March 14, 2025
1	"Debut’s Plan : 21 trainees compete! With their STRENGTH"	March 17, 2025
2	"Debut’s Plan : You have to overcome your weaknesses to survive. That's competition"	March 21, 2025
3	"Debut’s Plan : Strength&Weakness Position Assessment-ENDGAME"	March 28, 2025
4	"Debut’s Plan : COMMUNICATION (SNS Language Concept)"	April 4, 2025
5	"Debut’s Plan : NewKids Drama 「ImPerfect Game」 Audition : Limited Series"	April 11, 2025
6	"Debut’s Plan : Once Chance, One Team" (Korean: Debut’s Plan : 한 번의 기회, 하나의 팀)	April 18, 2025
7	"Debut’s Plan : The important thing is to never give up."	April 21, 2025
8	"Debut’s Plan : SEMI FINAL"	April 25, 2025 (Note: Livestreamed instead of standard upload); May 1, 2025 (Note: Standard upload)
9	"Debut’s Plan : FINAL"	May 4, 2025; May 10, 2025

== Contestants ==
There were a total of 35 contestants involved with the show, but 21 contestants, who made it into the Debut Prep Group, have enough data to record. The English names of all the contestants are presented in accordance with the official website.

Color key

Final members of Idid
Contestants eliminated in the final episode
Contestants eliminated at the second elimination round
Contestants eliminated at the first elimination round
Contestants that left the show
Top 7 contestants of the Ranking Announcement (Note: Based on Individual Votes/Score) (Note: Top 5 in finale)
Contestants in NewKids7 (Note: Episodes 2-6); Selected by the Board (Note: Episodes 8 & 9)
Contestants in the Top 7 and selected by the board (Note: Episode 8)
Debut Super Pass; Fan Save Vote (Note: Episode 9)

Name	Age (Note: As of March 14, 2025, added new age if contestant is still in the show during their birthday)	Training Period Category	Ranking														
Name	Age	Training Period Category	Ep. 0 (Note: Trainee Self-Evaluation, Infinite Number of #1 Slots)	Ep. 2		Ep. 3		Ep. 4		Ep. 5		Ep. 6		Ep. 7	Ep. 8	Ep. 9	Final
Name	Age	Training Period Category	#	# (Note: Interim Vote Tally)	#	#	#	# (Note: Vote Result)	#	#	#	#	#	#	#	# (Note: 50% Fan Votes, 50% Board Member Scores)	#
Kim Min-jae (김민재)	19	Senior	1	5	8	5	1	3	-	5	-	4	-	2	3	1	1
Jang Yong-hoon (장용훈)	19-20	Junior	1	1	4	1	8	1	-	1	-	1	-	5	2	2	2
Baek Jun-hyuk (백준혁)	16	Senior	8	12	15	13	7	7	-	12	-	5	-	7	6	3	3
Park Won-bin (박원빈)	18-19	Senior	3	4	1	4	3	5	-	3	-	6	-	4	5	4	4
Chu Yoo-chan (추유찬)	18	Senior	1	19	3	15	9	15	-	15		13	-	12	13	5	5
Jeong Se-min (정세민)	16	Beginner	1	2	16	2	15	2	-	4	-	3	-	1	1	6	6
Park Jun-hwan (박준환)	18	Beginner	10	11	19	18	20	12	-	18	-	17	-	16	16	12	7
Park Seong-hyeon (박성현)	17	Senior	13	17	12	14	21	18	-	14	-	11	-	8	8	7	8
Jang Kyu-hyun (장규현)	20	Beginner	18	16	11	9	11	6	-	7	-	2	-	3	4	8	9
Lee Tae-geon (이태건)	16	Senior	24	13	14	8	10	10	-	9	-	8	-	11	9	9	10
Kim Ji-yong (김지용)	20	Senior	1	6	9	6	2	8	-	11	-	10	1	9	10	10	11
Wu Hao (우하오)	20	Senior	1	18	5	10	5	16	-	2	-	7	-	6	7	11	12
Jin Bo-min (진보민)	21	Senior	2	9	17	16	16	9	-	17	-	12	-	10	11	Eliminated	13
Miyata Haru (宮田 陽) / (하루)	19	Junior	19	7	18	7	12	11	-	6	-	9	-	14	12	Eliminated	14
Lee Jun-seo (이준서)	18	Junior	1	8	20	19	13	13	-	16	-	15	-	13	14	Eliminated	15
Suzuki Kaira (カイラ) / (카이라)	16	Junior	16	10	1	12	4	14	-	10	-	14	-	15	15	Eliminated	16
Jo Min-jae (조민재) (Note: Jo Min-jae was a contestant on Make Mate 1)	21	Junior	21	14	7	11	14	20	-	13	-	18	-	17	17	Eliminated	17
Lee Woo-ju (이우주)	14-15	Junior	9	15	6	17	6	17	-	19	-	20	-	18	18	Eliminated	18
Kim Yun-seo (김윤서)	18	Junior	1	20	13	20	18	19	-	20	-	19	-	19	19	Eliminated	19
Jeon Jun-seo (전준서)	17	Junior	5	21	21	21	19	21	-	21	-	16	-	20	20	Eliminated	20
Seok June (석준)	18	Junior	6	3	10	3	17	4	-	8	-	Left the show (Note: Seok June was considered as removed from the show from Episode 6's interim voting tally, but was still in the footage for Episodes 6 and 7)					21
Thomas (토마스)	N/A	Senior	1	Eliminated													22-33
Hwang Nam-jun (황남준)	N/A	Junior	22	Eliminated													22-33
Jung Jun-hyeon (정준현)	N/A	Junior	15	Eliminated													22-33
Lee Gyu-hwan (이규환)	N/A	Junior	7	Eliminated													22-33
Cho Eun-chan (조은찬)	N/A	Beginner	1	Eliminated													22-33
Daito (다이토)	N/A	Beginner	11	Eliminated													22-33
Hwang Si-hoon (황시훈)	N/A	Beginner	17	Eliminated													22-33
Kang Hyun (강현) (Note: Kang Hyun is a member of N.TOP)	20	Beginner	23	Eliminated													22-33
Lee Woo-seok (이우석)	N/A	Beginner	20	Eliminated													22-33
Moon Si-mon (문시몬)	N/A	Beginner	14	Eliminated													22-33
Park Jun-seong (박준성)	19	Beginner	12	Eliminated													22-33
Shin Jae-ha (신재하)	17	Beginner	4	Eliminated													22-33

== Missions ==
=== Debut Prep Group (Episode 0) ===
Out of the 33 starting contestants, 21 are to be selected to be part of the Debut Prep Group. The 21 contestants of the Debut Prep Group get to move onto the five Plan stages, while the remaining 12 get eliminated from the show. In the order the trainees are brought in, they are immediately requested to self evaluate themselves amongst the rest of the trainees, according to their standards. Each trainee also has a certain color name tag, with each color representing the time range of their trainee period at Starship Entertainment, with Yellow - Beginner (-1 year), Blue - Junior (1–3 years), and Pink - Senior (3+ years). This mission will have all the contestants learn the show's theme song, ImPerfect, from the trainers, and prepare individual evaluations to present to the Starship Entertainment board members, who will select the 21 contestants for the Debut Prep Group. The video evaluations are shot in a one-take format, once the contestants start filming the video, they may not stop recording even if a mistake is made. After watching all the video evaluations, the board members select the 21 contestants to move onto the Plan stages.

Plan 0: Debut Prep Group
Beginner			Junior			Senior		
Contestant	Training Period	Result	Contestant	Training Period	Result	Contestant	Training Period	Result
Lee Wooseok	1 Month	Eliminated	Seok June	1 Year	Pass	Thomas	3 Years; 1 Month	Eliminated
Kang Hyun	1 Month	Eliminated	Lee Gyuhwan	1 Year; 1 Month	Eliminated	Baek Junhyuk	3 Years; 4 Months	Pass
Daito	3 Months	Eliminated	Lee Junseo	1 Year; 1 Month	Pass	Kim Minjae	3 Years; 5 Months	Pass
Cho Eunchan	3 Months	Eliminated	Kim Yunseo	1 Year; 1 Month	Pass	Jin Bomin	3 Years; 7 Months	Pass
Shin Jaeha	3 Months	Eliminated	Jo Minjae	1 Year; 1 Month	Pass	Wu Hao	3 Years; 8 Months	Pass
Park Junhwan	5 Months	Pass	Jeon Junseo	1 Year; 2 Months	Pass	Park Seonghyeon	3 Years; 9 Months	Pass
Jang Kyuhyun	6 Months	Pass	Lee Wooju	1 Year; 3 Months	Pass	Lee Taegeon	4 Years; 2 Months	Pass
Hwang Sihun	8 Months	Eliminated	Jung Junhyeon	1 Year; 5 Months	Eliminated	Chu Yoochan	4 Years; 4 Months	Pass
Moon Simon	8 Months	Eliminated	Miyata Haru	1 Year; 6 Months	Pass	Park Wonbin	4 Years; 4 Months	Pass
Jeong Semin	10 Months	Pass	Hwang Namjun	2 Years; 1 Month	Eliminated	Kim Jiyong	5 Years; 9 Months	Pass
Park Junseong	10 Months	Eliminated	Suzuki Kaira	2 Years; 2 Months	Pass			
			Jang Yonghoon	2 Years; 4 Months	Pass			

=== Strength Position Assessment (Episode 1-2) ===
This mission will have the contestants challenge for the position they are the most confident in to prove their worth. The contestants are presented with five songs, three for the vocal position, and two for the dance position. The vocal position receives the options of 'Monster' by Irene and Seulgi of Red Velvet, 'You Were Beautiful' by Day6, and Magnetic by Illit, while the dance position receives the options of two original songs; 'New A.G.K' and 'DWN'. The team compositions start with a random selection of four contestants, who each choose two to four trainees to have on their team, with the six unchosen contestants forming the fifth team. The song selection involves a game of 'Capture the Flag', in which teams for each position have to send up their member with the best physical attributes to charge for the flag placed on the circumference of the stage, while being tied to one another. The contestant who fulfills their position the best in each of the five teams will automatically be part of the top 7 for the Plan, titled 'NewKids7', in addition to one other member from the first place team of each position. The benefits for the members of this Plan's NewKids7 are a performance video for the signal song of the show, and a concept photoshoot.

Color key

Main Position (Note: Position refers to either Vocalist or Dancer)
Leader
Winning Team
NewKids7

Plan 1: Strength Position Assessment
Performance			Team		Contestants		
#	Song	Original Artist(s)/ Production Credit	Name	Score	Name	Rank	Score
Vocal
3	"Monster"	Red Velvet – Irene & Seulgi	Star Kids	86.3	Jo Minjae	2	88
3	"Monster"	Red Velvet – Irene & Seulgi	Star Kids	86.3	Wu Hao	1	90
3	"Monster"	Red Velvet – Irene & Seulgi	Star Kids	86.3	Miyata Haru	3	81
5	"You Were Beautiful"	Day6	찬건 용서해조 (ChanGeonYongSeo Please)	86.5	Chu Yoochan	1	93
5	"You Were Beautiful"	Day6	찬건 용서해조 (ChanGeonYongSeo Please)	86.5	Kim Jiyong	2	86
5	"You Were Beautiful"	Day6	찬건 용서해조 (ChanGeonYongSeo Please)	86.5	Kim Yunseo	3	84
5	"You Were Beautiful"	Day6	찬건 용서해조 (ChanGeonYongSeo Please)	86.5	Lee Taegeon	4	83
4	"Magnetic"	Illit	N♡S	82.3	Lee Junseo	3	79
4	"Magnetic"	Illit	N♡S	82.3	Jang Kyuhyun	1	85
4	"Magnetic"	Illit	N♡S	82.3	Jeong Semin	2	83
Dance
1	"New A.G.K"	Lyrics & Composition: SQVARE, Avenue 52, Waveshower; Choreography: Jang Yonghoon, Park Wonbin, Lee Wooju, Seok June, Jeon Junseo, Park Junhwan	Fly High	86.3	Park Wonbin	1	94
1	"New A.G.K"	Lyrics & Composition: SQVARE, Avenue 52, Waveshower; Choreography: Jang Yonghoon, Park Wonbin, Lee Wooju, Seok June, Jeon Junseo, Park Junhwan	Fly High	86.3	Jang Yonghoon	2	91
1	"New A.G.K"	Lyrics & Composition: SQVARE, Avenue 52, Waveshower; Choreography: Jang Yonghoon, Park Wonbin, Lee Wooju, Seok June, Jeon Junseo, Park Junhwan	Fly High	86.3	Lee Wooju	3	90
1	"New A.G.K"	Lyrics & Composition: SQVARE, Avenue 52, Waveshower; Choreography: Jang Yonghoon, Park Wonbin, Lee Wooju, Seok June, Jeon Junseo, Park Junhwan	Fly High	86.3	Jeon Junseo	6	78
1	"New A.G.K"	Lyrics & Composition: SQVARE, Avenue 52, Waveshower; Choreography: Jang Yonghoon, Park Wonbin, Lee Wooju, Seok June, Jeon Junseo, Park Junhwan	Fly High	86.3	Seok June	4	86
1	"New A.G.K"	Lyrics & Composition: SQVARE, Avenue 52, Waveshower; Choreography: Jang Yonghoon, Park Wonbin, Lee Wooju, Seok June, Jeon Junseo, Park Junhwan	Fly High	86.3	Park Junhwan	5	79
2	"DWN"	Lyrics & Composition: thesecret, Czaer, Guilty Pleasure; Choreography: Suzuki Kaira, Park Seonghyeon, Kim Minjae, Baek Junhyuk, Jin Bomin	High Five	86.2	Kim Minjae	2	87
2	"DWN"	Lyrics & Composition: thesecret, Czaer, Guilty Pleasure; Choreography: Suzuki Kaira, Park Seonghyeon, Kim Minjae, Baek Junhyuk, Jin Bomin	High Five	86.2	Jin Bomin	5	85
2	"DWN"	Lyrics & Composition: thesecret, Czaer, Guilty Pleasure; Choreography: Suzuki Kaira, Park Seonghyeon, Kim Minjae, Baek Junhyuk, Jin Bomin	High Five	86.2	Suzuki Kaira	1	94
2	"DWN"	Lyrics & Composition: thesecret, Czaer, Guilty Pleasure; Choreography: Suzuki Kaira, Park Seonghyeon, Kim Minjae, Baek Junhyuk, Jin Bomin	High Five	86.2	Park Seonghyeon	3	85
2	"DWN"	Lyrics & Composition: thesecret, Czaer, Guilty Pleasure; Choreography: Suzuki Kaira, Park Seonghyeon, Kim Minjae, Baek Junhyuk, Jin Bomin	High Five	86.2	Baek Junhyuk	4	83

=== Weakness Position Assessment (Episode 2-3) ===
This mission will have the contestants improve in a position they are the least confident in. Using the positions of the previous Plan, every contestants has their position swapped from Vocal to Dance, or vice versa. The contestants are presented with four songs, two for the vocal position, and two for the dance position. The vocal position receives the options of 'Shine With Me' by IVE and Girls by aespa, while the dance position receives the options of two original songs; 'So G.oo.D' and 'I'm OK, You're OK'. The song selections are chosen by the first place contestant of both dance teams from the previous mission, and the first place contestant of the first and second place team vocal teams. The contestant that gets to choose their song and their teammates is determined through another game called 'Ball Keeper', in which the contestants of the same position are pitted against each other to gain possession of a ball placed in the center of the stage within a time limit, with the winner of each matchup getting to select their song and their teammates. Midway through preparations, it gets announced that the teams have the choice to trade one of their members with the other team of the same position. The benefit for the winning team between each matchup is that each contestant receives an additional seven points to their individual score, while the first place contestant in that team receives ten additional points instead of seven. The NewKids7 for this Plan are determined through adding the individual scores of each contestants from both the Strength and Weakness Position Assessments, including the benefit from the Weakness Position Assessment, with the top 7 contestants with the highest scores becoming the members of this Plan's NewKids7. The benefits for the members of this Plan's NewKids7 are another performance video for the signal song of the show, and another concept photoshoot.

Color key

Main Position
Leader
Leader and Main Position
Winning Team
NewKids7
Contestant unable to perform

Plan 2: Weakness Position Assessment
Performance			Team		Contestants				Overall (Note: Cumulative of Plan 1 & Plan 2)	
#	Song	Original Artist(s)/ Production Credit	Name	Score	Name	Rank	Score	Benefit	Score	Rank
Vocal
4	"Shine With Me"	IVE	Shining Boys	89.6	Suzuki Kaira	1	94	0	188	4
4	"Shine With Me"	IVE	Shining Boys	89.6	Jang Yonghoon	2	91	0	182	8
4	"Shine With Me"	IVE	Shining Boys	89.6	Seok June	5	86	0	172	16
4	"Shine With Me"	IVE	Shining Boys	89.6	Park Junhwan	4	87	0	166	20
4	"Shine With Me"	IVE	Shining Boys	89.6	Jin Bomin (Note: Jin Bomin was originally on Girls but was traded to Shine With Me)	3	90	0	172	16
4	"Shine With Me"	IVE	Shining Boys	89.6	Park Seonghyeon (Note: Park Seonghyeon was originally on Shine With Me but was not able to perform due to an illness.)	N/A		0	85	21
3	"Girls"	aespa	Da BoyZ	89.8	Kim Minjae	1	95	10	192	1
3	"Girls"	aespa	Da BoyZ	89.8	Park Wonbin	3	88	7	189	3
3	"Girls"	aespa	Da BoyZ	89.8	Baek Junhyuk	2	93	7	183	7
3	"Girls"	aespa	Da BoyZ	89.8	Lee Wooju	4	87	7	184	6
3	"Girls"	aespa	Da BoyZ	89.8	Jeon Junseo	5	86	7	171	18
Dance
1	"So G.oo.D"	Lyrics & Composition: High Brew, Cimo Fränkel, Rik Annema, MarkAlong, Czaer; Choreography: Wu Hao, Lee Taegeon, Jang Kyuhyun, Kim Jiyong, Lee Junseo	G.oo.Ds	90.6	Wu Hao	3	90	7	187	5
1	"So G.oo.D"	Lyrics & Composition: High Brew, Cimo Fränkel, Rik Annema, MarkAlong, Czaer; Choreography: Wu Hao, Lee Taegeon, Jang Kyuhyun, Kim Jiyong, Lee Junseo	G.oo.Ds	90.6	Kim Jiyong	1	94	10	190	2
1	"So G.oo.D"	Lyrics & Composition: High Brew, Cimo Fränkel, Rik Annema, MarkAlong, Czaer; Choreography: Wu Hao, Lee Taegeon, Jang Kyuhyun, Kim Jiyong, Lee Junseo	G.oo.Ds	90.6	Lee Taegeon	2	91	7	181	10
1	"So G.oo.D"	Lyrics & Composition: High Brew, Cimo Fränkel, Rik Annema, MarkAlong, Czaer; Choreography: Wu Hao, Lee Taegeon, Jang Kyuhyun, Kim Jiyong, Lee Junseo	G.oo.Ds	90.6	Lee Junseo	4	89	7	175	13
1	"So G.oo.D"	Lyrics & Composition: High Brew, Cimo Fränkel, Rik Annema, MarkAlong, Czaer; Choreography: Wu Hao, Lee Taegeon, Jang Kyuhyun, Kim Jiyong, Lee Junseo	G.oo.Ds	90.6	Jang Kyuhyun	4	89	7	181	10
2	"I'm OK, You're OK"	Lyrics & Composition: SQVARE, AVENUE 52, Phil Schwan; Choreography: Miyata Haru, Jo Minjae, Chu Yoochan, Kim Yunseo, Jeong Semin	We're OK	90	Miyata Haru	1	97	0	178	12
2	"I'm OK, You're OK"	Lyrics & Composition: SQVARE, AVENUE 52, Phil Schwan; Choreography: Miyata Haru, Jo Minjae, Chu Yoochan, Kim Yunseo, Jeong Semin	We're OK	90	Chu Yoochan	3	89	0	182	8
2	"I'm OK, You're OK"	Lyrics & Composition: SQVARE, AVENUE 52, Phil Schwan; Choreography: Miyata Haru, Jo Minjae, Chu Yoochan, Kim Yunseo, Jeong Semin	We're OK	90	Jo Minjae	4	87	0	175	13
2	"I'm OK, You're OK"	Lyrics & Composition: SQVARE, AVENUE 52, Phil Schwan; Choreography: Miyata Haru, Jo Minjae, Chu Yoochan, Kim Yunseo, Jeong Semin	We're OK	90	Kim Yunseo	4	87	0	171	18
2	"I'm OK, You're OK"	Lyrics & Composition: SQVARE, AVENUE 52, Phil Schwan; Choreography: Miyata Haru, Jo Minjae, Chu Yoochan, Kim Yunseo, Jeong Semin	We're OK	90	Jeong Semin	2	90	0	173	15

=== Communication Assessment (Episode 4) ===
This mission will have the contestants experience how to communicate with fans through language, concepts, and social media. Each of the songs the contestants are presented with have different distinct concepts, chosen by the directors to resonate with the public audience. The chosen songs and concepts are as follows: Chewing Gum by NCT Dream - Boyhood, Case 143 by Stray Kids - Crush, and XO (Only If You Say Yes) by Enhypen - Fantasy. The team compositions start with all the contestants going to the concept room for whichever one they would like to perform, starting with the current first place contestant, and continuing with a random order from there. After every contestant has chosen their song/concept, if any of the three has overflow members, that room would select their best six or seven to stay while the unselected trainees would have to fill in the empty spots in another concept room. After team selections were finalized, it was announced that all the concept songs will partially be in a different language, having Japanese, English, and Chinese as options. Midway through preparations, two hidden missions were announced that were within the main Plan. The contestants would have to include sign language into the second part of their performance, to represent further communication with fans, and a dance break that included tutting. The NewKids7 for this Plan are determined by a vote not only by the board members, but also seventy other Starship judges, with the board members votes being worth ten times the other, with a maximum points total of 140. The team with the most votes becomes this Plan's NewKids7. The benefits for the members of this Plan's NewKids7 are a showcase video for a ballad version of the signal song of the show, and another concept photoshoot.

Color key

ID Member (Note: Equivalent to Center)
Leader
Leader and ID Member
Winning Team
NewKids7

Plan 3: Communication Assessment
Performance				Team				Contestants (Note: Park Seonghyeon was not able to perform again, presumably due to an illness, but did not officially leave the show.)		
#	Concept	Song (Note: The different language version only applies to the first verse and first chorus, while sign language applies to the second verse and second chorus.)	Original Artist(s)	Name	Score			Position	Name	Result
#	Concept	Song	Original Artist(s)	Name	Board Members	Starship Judges	Total (Note: Sums up to the maximum 140)	Position	Name	Result
1	Boyhood	"Chewing Gum (泡泡糖)" (Chinese Version)	NCT Dream	껌딱지 (Chewing Gum)	30	31	61	Main Vocal	Jo Minjae	-
1	Boyhood	"Chewing Gum (泡泡糖)" (Chinese Version)	NCT Dream	껌딱지 (Chewing Gum)	30	31	61	Sub Vocal 1	Kim Jiyong	-
1	Boyhood	"Chewing Gum (泡泡糖)" (Chinese Version)	NCT Dream	껌딱지 (Chewing Gum)	30	31	61	Sub Vocal 2	Suzuki Kaira	-
1	Boyhood	"Chewing Gum (泡泡糖)" (Chinese Version)	NCT Dream	껌딱지 (Chewing Gum)	30	31	61	Sub Vocal 3	Jeong Semin	-
1	Boyhood	"Chewing Gum (泡泡糖)" (Chinese Version)	NCT Dream	껌딱지 (Chewing Gum)	30	31	61	Sub Vocal 4	Miyata Haru	-
1	Boyhood	"Chewing Gum (泡泡糖)" (Chinese Version)	NCT Dream	껌딱지 (Chewing Gum)	30	31	61	Rapper 1	Park Wonbin	-
1	Boyhood	"Chewing Gum (泡泡糖)" (Chinese Version)	NCT Dream	껌딱지 (Chewing Gum)	30	31	61	Rapper 2	Kim Minjae	-
2	Crush	"Case 143" (Japanese Version)	Stray Kids	C.N (Crush NewKids)	10	6	16	Main Rapper	Wu Hao	-
2	Crush	"Case 143" (Japanese Version)	Stray Kids	C.N (Crush NewKids)	10	6	16	Sub Rapper 1	Kim Yunseo	-
2	Crush	"Case 143" (Japanese Version)	Stray Kids	C.N (Crush NewKids)	10	6	16	Sub Rapper 2	Seok June	-
2	Crush	"Case 143" (Japanese Version)	Stray Kids	C.N (Crush NewKids)	10	6	16	Vocal 1	Lee Taegeon	-
2	Crush	"Case 143" (Japanese Version)	Stray Kids	C.N (Crush NewKids)	10	6	16	Vocal 2	Jeon Junseo	-
2	Crush	"Case 143" (Japanese Version)	Stray Kids	C.N (Crush NewKids)	10	6	16	Vocal 3	Lee Wooju	-
3	Fantasy	"XO (Only If You Say Yes)" (English Version)	Enhypen	X_{○} (Ten Points)	30	33	63	Main Vocal	Lee Junseo	NewKids7
3	Fantasy	"XO (Only If You Say Yes)" (English Version)	Enhypen	X_{○} (Ten Points)	30	33	63	Sub Vocal 1	Jang Yonghoon	NewKids7
3	Fantasy	"XO (Only If You Say Yes)" (English Version)	Enhypen	X_{○} (Ten Points)	30	33	63	Sub Vocal 2	Baek Junhyuk	NewKids7
3	Fantasy	"XO (Only If You Say Yes)" (English Version)	Enhypen	X_{○} (Ten Points)	30	33	63	Sub Vocal 3	Jang Kyuhyun	NewKids7
3	Fantasy	"XO (Only If You Say Yes)" (English Version)	Enhypen	X_{○} (Ten Points)	30	33	63	Sub Vocal 4	Jin Bomin	NewKids7
3	Fantasy	"XO (Only If You Say Yes)" (English Version)	Enhypen	X_{○} (Ten Points)	30	33	63	Sub Vocal 5	Chu Yoochan	NewKids7
3	Fantasy	"XO (Only If You Say Yes)" (English Version)	Enhypen	X_{○} (Ten Points)	30	33	63	Sub Vocal 6	Park Junhwan	NewKids7

=== Expression Assessment (Episode 5) ===
This mission will have the contestants audition for roles in Debut's Plan's drama, "ImPerfect Game". The benefit for the members of this Plan's NewKids7 are the lead roles of the drama, the chance to record their voices for the OST for the drama, and another concept photoshoot. The remaining fourteen contestants who are not part of NewKids7 will play supporting roles and extras. The seven contestants to be cast as the lead roles are to be decided by the board members and the "ImPerfect Game" production team through a Casting Audition. The main part of the Casting Audition will be performed in groups of three, with each group acting out a scene from the drama. Each of the groups are self-selected by the trainees themselves. As a benefit for the teams who form quicker, they get to choose which scene they'd like to act out, as each scene has a certain amount of space for the teams. After every team has been finalized with their scene, they are assigned to determine the temporary roles of each person in each team amongst themselves, which are still able to change before the day of the Casting Audition. In the days leading up to audition day, the contestants receive a three-day general acting class from a trained actor, to improve their skills within the field. Alongside the group scene, each contestant will also individually prepare a solo monologue to present after their group scene at the Casting Audition. After all the groups have acted out their group scene, and everyone has acted out their solo monologue scene, the drama producers and the board members simply determine the NewKids7 by determining who's the best fit for each of the lead roles in the drama.

Color key

Leader
NewKids7

Plan 4: Expression Assessment
Scene			Contestants			Results		
#	Number	Roles	Contestants			Roles	Contestant	Jersey #
3,4,7	S15 (Vacant Lot Scene)	Baekhoon	Jang Yonghoon	Seok June	Jeon Junseo	Kang Hanil	Park Wonbin	3
3,4,7	S15 (Vacant Lot Scene)	Kang Hanil	Jo Minjae	Chu Yoochan	Park Junhwan	Seo Joonki	Chu Yoochan	7
3,4,7	S15 (Vacant Lot Scene)	Song Woobin	Lee Junseo	Kim Yunseo	Kim Minjae	Baekhoon	Jang Yonghoon	9
1,2	S25 (Classroom Scene)	Baekhoon	Park Seonghyeon	Jang Kyuhyun		Nam Jaehyuk	Baek Junhyuk	77
1,2	S25 (Classroom Scene)	Kang Hanil	Jin Bomin	Jeong Semin		Otani Choi	Miyata Haru	25
1,2	S25 (Classroom Scene)	Song Woobin	Baek Junhyuk	Kim Jiyong		Choi Sunho	Jang Kyuhyun	17
5,6	S49 (Beach Scene)	Baekhoon	Miyata Haru	Suzuki Kaira		Song Woobin	Seok June	67
5,6	S49 (Beach Scene)	Kang Hanil	Lee Wooju	Lee Taegeon				
5,6	S49 (Beach Scene)	Song Woobin	Wu Hao	Park Wonbin				

=== Teamwork Assessment (Episode 6) ===
This mission will have the contestants use the one-take method to film a "Team Performance Video". The contestants are presented with the one singular song they are tasked with creating the performance video for; an original song, "Balla". It's revealed that all twenty-one contestants are going to be one singular team, who will have to work together to create the performance video. They are given seven days, tasked with creating the choreography from scratch, while having to incorporate various locations around the Debut's Plan Hideout in the video, which tests their producing skills. Then they're told they have one chance to film the video, using the one-take method to film all of it, which prohibits cutting between scenes. Regardless of the outcome of the one chance at filming, the video will be released to the public, including whatever mistakes were made, if any at all. The parts for this Plan are decided by the contestants, based on each contestant's personal skills, as well as their ability so sacrifice for others and understanding, with the voted team leader getting to act as the chief producer of the performance video, who's responsible for managing practices, the performance setting, choreography, and contestant formations throughout the week and during the performance. After the leader was selected, he was able to select two other contestants to be co-leaders, to aid in preparations. From there, the leaders separated the song into parts and assigned other contestants to direct the choreography creation and practice for those specific parts. Midway through preparations, the contestants got to go to teamwork camp, to improve their communication, collaboration, coordination, and cooperation skills. The NewKids7 for this Plan are chosen through vote by the twenty-one contestants themselves once the Plan is over. The benefits for the members of this Plan's NewKids7 are a relay dance performance video of the signal song of the show, and another concept photoshoot.

Color key

Leader
NewKids7

Plan 5: Teamwork Assessment
Song	Production Credit	Roles	Contestants	Roles	Contestants	Roles	Contestants	Results	
"Balla"	Lyrics & Composition: Czaer, MarkAlong; Choreography: NewKids	Leader	Kim Jiyong	Dancers	Jang Kyuhyun	Dancers	Lee Junseo	NewKids7	Kim Jiyong
"Balla"	Lyrics & Composition: Czaer, MarkAlong; Choreography: NewKids	Co-Leaders	Park Seonghyeon (Note: Park Seonghyeon and Jang Yonghoon led choreography rehearsal for Part 1)	Dancers	Jeong Semin	Dancers	Jeon Junseo	NewKids7	Jang Kyuhyun
"Balla"	Lyrics & Composition: Czaer, MarkAlong; Choreography: NewKids	Co-Leaders	Baek Junhyuk (Note: Baek Junhyuk led choreography rehearsal for Part 2)	Dancers	Park Wonbin	Dancers	Park Junhwan	NewKids7	Park Wonbin
"Balla"	Lyrics & Composition: Czaer, MarkAlong; Choreography: NewKids	Part Directors	Jang Yonghoon	Dancers	Wu Hao	Dancers	Jo Minjae	NewKids7	Miyata Haru
"Balla"	Lyrics & Composition: Czaer, MarkAlong; Choreography: NewKids	Part Directors	Miyata Haru (Note: Miyata Haru and Kim Minjae led choreography rehearsal for Part 3) (Note: Miyata Haru and Suzuki Kaira led choreography rehearsal for Part 8)	Dancers	Lee Taegeon	Dancers	Kim Yunseo	NewKids7	Kim Minjae
"Balla"	Lyrics & Composition: Czaer, MarkAlong; Choreography: NewKids	Part Directors	Kim Minjae	Dancers	Jin Bomin	Dancers	Lee Wooju	NewKids7	Jang Yonghoon
"Balla"	Lyrics & Composition: Czaer, MarkAlong; Choreography: NewKids	Part Directors	Suzuki Kaira	Dancers	Chu Yoochan	Dancers	Seok June	NewKids7	Park Seonghyeon

=== Pre-Debut Assessment (Episode 7-8) ===
This mission is the contestants' final step before heading to the final debut assessment. This mission will have the contestants finally experience performing live, in front of an audience of fans. Also for the first time, there will be contestants eliminated from the show post-performances, although the board members will have the choice to save someone from being eliminated, with the Debut Super Pass, allowing them to continue onto the final debut assessment as well, if they so choose. The contestants are presented with three original songs; 'Step Up - With My Fluttering Heart', 'Sticky Bomb', and 'Password'. Through the first five plans, based on the skills and charms that each contestant has shown, the board members have categorized the contestants into the positions of a standard K-pop group; Vocal, Dance, Rap, Vocal Tone, and All-Rounder. The team compositions are determined partially using these positions. In each song, each position has a capacity of one-third of all the members in one position, to ensure fair distribution of skills amongst the three songs, with any contestant who has been in a minimum of four of the five prior NewKids7's being able to guarantee the song that they want, the Position Save benefit. The contestants are instructed to go to the recording studio for the song of their choice, in a random order, each position at a time. Once all the contestants have chosen their first pick, any positions with overflow members had to decide who to drop from the team, while being required to keep those in possession of the Position Save benefit. Once the teams were finalized, each team had to select their ID their member through a short audition process. The contestants were not directly assessed based on their performances this time around, instead, after the performances, the board members announced their seven contestants picked to move onto the finals, and then the top seven voted by the fans were revealed shortly after.

Color key

ID Member
Leader

Plan 6: Pre-Debut Assessment
Positions
All-Rounder	Main Vocal	Dance Line		Rap Line		Vocal Tone Line
Jang Yonghoon	Jo Minjae	Suzuki Kaira		Park Seonghyeon		Jang Kyuhyun
Park Wonbin	Chu Yoochan	Miyata Haru		Kim Yunseo		Jin Bomin
Wu Hao	Lee Junseo	Lee Wooju		Seok June		Jeon Junseo
Kim Jiyong						Jeong Semin
Kim Minjae						Park Junhwan
Baek Junhyuk						Lee Taegeon
Performance			Team		Contestants	
#	Song	Production Credit	Name		Position	Name
1	"너를 향한 내 설렘 Step Up" (Step Up - With My Fluttering Heart)	Lyrics & Composition: David Amber, Donna, Aether, Val De Prete	Happy Virus		Main Vocal	Chu Yoochan
1	"너를 향한 내 설렘 Step Up" (Step Up - With My Fluttering Heart)	Lyrics & Composition: David Amber, Donna, Aether, Val De Prete	Happy Virus		Sub Vocal 1	Wu Hao
1	"너를 향한 내 설렘 Step Up" (Step Up - With My Fluttering Heart)	Lyrics & Composition: David Amber, Donna, Aether, Val De Prete	Happy Virus		Sub Vocal 2	Lee Taegeon
1	"너를 향한 내 설렘 Step Up" (Step Up - With My Fluttering Heart)	Lyrics & Composition: David Amber, Donna, Aether, Val De Prete	Happy Virus		Sub Vocal 3	Park Junhwan
1	"너를 향한 내 설렘 Step Up" (Step Up - With My Fluttering Heart)	Lyrics & Composition: David Amber, Donna, Aether, Val De Prete	Happy Virus		Sub Vocal 4	Suzuki Kaira
1	"너를 향한 내 설렘 Step Up" (Step Up - With My Fluttering Heart)	Lyrics & Composition: David Amber, Donna, Aether, Val De Prete	Happy Virus		Rapper 1	Kim Yunseo
1	"너를 향한 내 설렘 Step Up" (Step Up - With My Fluttering Heart)	Lyrics & Composition: David Amber, Donna, Aether, Val De Prete	Happy Virus		Rapper 2	Park Wonbin (Note: Park Wonbin, Jang Kyuhyun, and Jang Yonghoon all had a Position Save card)
2	"Sticky Bomb"	Lyrics & Composition: Young Jay, flow blow, Aether	No Doubt		Main Vocal	Jo Minjae
2	"Sticky Bomb"	Lyrics & Composition: Young Jay, flow blow, Aether	No Doubt		Rapper 1	Park Seonghyeon
2	"Sticky Bomb"	Lyrics & Composition: Young Jay, flow blow, Aether	No Doubt		Rapper 2	Jin Bomin
2	"Sticky Bomb"	Lyrics & Composition: Young Jay, flow blow, Aether	No Doubt		Rapper 3	Baek Junhyuk
2	"Sticky Bomb"	Lyrics & Composition: Young Jay, flow blow, Aether	No Doubt		Sub Vocal 1	Miyata Haru
2	"Sticky Bomb"	Lyrics & Composition: Young Jay, flow blow, Aether	No Doubt		Sub Vocal 2	Kim Minjae
2	"Sticky Bomb"	Lyrics & Composition: Young Jay, flow blow, Aether	No Doubt		Sub Vocal 3	Jeon Junseo
3	"둘만 아는 Password"	Lyrics & Composition: 20Hz	****** (Star Code)		Main Vocal	Lee Junseo
3	"둘만 아는 Password"	Lyrics & Composition: 20Hz	****** (Star Code)		Sub Vocal 1	Jeong Semin
3	"둘만 아는 Password"	Lyrics & Composition: 20Hz	****** (Star Code)		Sub Vocal 2	Jang Yonghoon
3	"둘만 아는 Password"	Lyrics & Composition: 20Hz	****** (Star Code)		Sub Vocal 3	Kim Jiyong
3	"둘만 아는 Password"	Lyrics & Composition: 20Hz	****** (Star Code)		Sub Vocal 4	Lee Wooju
3	"둘만 아는 Password"	Lyrics & Composition: 20Hz	****** (Star Code)		Sub Vocal 5	Jang Kyuhyun
3	"둘만 아는 Password"	Lyrics & Composition: 20Hz	****** (Star Code)		Rapper 1	Seok June

=== Debut Assessment (Episode 9) ===
This mission is the contestants' final step before getting to debut. The contestants are presented with two original songs; 'Taking Off - Through Your Dreams', and 'Blooming Crown'. This time around, the teams are not decided by the board, nor the contestants themselves, instead, the fans formed the teams by voting each contestant to either song. Each contestant is handed an envelope with a practice room written on it, and they're instructed to head to that room. Once each contestant is in their respective room, the songs for each room are revealed to the contestants in each room. The ID members for each performance were decided mainly by the NewKids themselves, with some aid from the board members. The board members initially chose three candidates for each song, and from there, each of them practiced the ID sections of the songs, with the final decision being done through vote by all of the NewKids afterwards. Again, the contestants were not directly assessed based on their performances this time around, instead, after the performances, the members of the debut group selected through fan voting and board selection were announced.

Color key

ID Member
Leader

Plan 7: Debut Assessment
Performance			Team	Contestants	
#	Song	Production Credit	Name	Position	Name
2	"꿈을 꿰뚫는 순간(飛必沖天)" (Taking Off - Through Your Dreams)	Lyrics & Composition: Gabe Lopez, NiNe, Aether, SQVARE, Avenue 52	뚫어뻥	Main Vocal	Kim Minjae
2	"꿈을 꿰뚫는 순간(飛必沖天)" (Taking Off - Through Your Dreams)	Lyrics & Composition: Gabe Lopez, NiNe, Aether, SQVARE, Avenue 52	뚫어뻥	Sub Vocal 1	Jang Yonghoon
2	"꿈을 꿰뚫는 순간(飛必沖天)" (Taking Off - Through Your Dreams)	Lyrics & Composition: Gabe Lopez, NiNe, Aether, SQVARE, Avenue 52	뚫어뻥	Sub Vocal 2	Jang Kyuhyun
2	"꿈을 꿰뚫는 순간(飛必沖天)" (Taking Off - Through Your Dreams)	Lyrics & Composition: Gabe Lopez, NiNe, Aether, SQVARE, Avenue 52	뚫어뻥	Sub Vocal 3	Chu Yoochan
2	"꿈을 꿰뚫는 순간(飛必沖天)" (Taking Off - Through Your Dreams)	Lyrics & Composition: Gabe Lopez, NiNe, Aether, SQVARE, Avenue 52	뚫어뻥	Rapper 1	Park Wonbin
2	"꿈을 꿰뚫는 순간(飛必沖天)" (Taking Off - Through Your Dreams)	Lyrics & Composition: Gabe Lopez, NiNe, Aether, SQVARE, Avenue 52	뚫어뻥	Rapper 2	Park Junhwan
1	"꽃피울 Crown" (Blooming Crown)	Lyrics & Composition: INFX, SQVARE, Avenue 52, Aether, Hanye	The Little Princes	Main Vocal	Wu Hao
1	"꽃피울 Crown" (Blooming Crown)	Lyrics & Composition: INFX, SQVARE, Avenue 52, Aether, Hanye	The Little Princes	Sub Vocal 1	Kim Jiyong
1	"꽃피울 Crown" (Blooming Crown)	Lyrics & Composition: INFX, SQVARE, Avenue 52, Aether, Hanye	The Little Princes	Sub Vocal 2	Lee Taegeon
1	"꽃피울 Crown" (Blooming Crown)	Lyrics & Composition: INFX, SQVARE, Avenue 52, Aether, Hanye	The Little Princes	Sub Vocal 3	Jeong Semin
1	"꽃피울 Crown" (Blooming Crown)	Lyrics & Composition: INFX, SQVARE, Avenue 52, Aether, Hanye	The Little Princes	Rapper 1	Park Seonghyeon
1	"꽃피울 Crown" (Blooming Crown)	Lyrics & Composition: INFX, SQVARE, Avenue 52, Aether, Hanye	The Little Princes	Rapper 2	Baek Junhyuk

== Rankings, Voting, and Eliminations ==
=== NewKids7 ===
After each Plan, the judges select 7 contestants, in different ways each round, to become NewKids7. The NewKids7 for the first five plans will get a concept photoshoot, and either the opportunity to do a dance or vocal cover of the show's theme song; 'ImPerfect', or receiving acting roles in the drama of the show; 'ImPerfect Game'.

Color key

New to NewKids7 (Note: Indicates contestants who had never placed in the NewKids7 in any prior elimination rounds or ranking announcements.)
Returned to NewKids (Note: Indicates contestants who had placed in NewKids7 in a prior elimination round or ranking announcement, then had placed out of it, and then had come back)

NewKids7
#	Plan 1 (Note: Selected by choosing the best member from each team, then the second place member from the two winning teams, ordered by individual score.)	Plan 2 (Note: Selected by combining the individual scores of Plan 1 and Plan 2 and taking the Top 7 scores)	Plan 3 (Note: All the members of the team who got the most votes from the board members and the 70 Starship judges automatically became members of this Plan's NewKids7)	Plan 4 (Note: Selected by the board and the "ImPerfect Game" production team, casting the best contestants for each lead role in the drama.)	Plan 5 (Note: Selected by the contestants themselves through a vote)	Plan 6 (Note: Selected by the board members to go on to the finals)
1	Park Wonbin; Suzuki Kaira	Kim Minjae (▲9)	Jang Yonghoon; Jang Kyuhyun; Baek Junhyuk; Jin Bomin; Park Junhwan; Lee Junseo; Chu Yoochan	Jang Yonghoon; Park Wonbin; Miyata Haru; Jang Kyuhyun; Seok June; Baek Junhyuk; Chu Yoochan	Kim Jiyong (▲1 (Note: Compared to Plan 2))	Jang Yonghoon (▲7)
2	N/A	Kim Jiyong (▲4)	Jang Yonghoon; Jang Kyuhyun; Baek Junhyuk; Jin Bomin; Park Junhwan; Lee Junseo; Chu Yoochan	Jang Yonghoon; Park Wonbin; Miyata Haru; Jang Kyuhyun; Seok June; Baek Junhyuk; Chu Yoochan	Jang Yonghoon; Jang Kyuhyun; Kim Minjae; Park Wonbin; Miyata Haru; Park Seonghyeon	Jang Kyuhyun (▲9)
3	Chu Yoochan	Park Wonbin (▼2)	Jang Yonghoon; Jang Kyuhyun; Baek Junhyuk; Jin Bomin; Park Junhwan; Lee Junseo; Chu Yoochan	Jang Yonghoon; Park Wonbin; Miyata Haru; Jang Kyuhyun; Seok June; Baek Junhyuk; Chu Yoochan	Jang Yonghoon; Jang Kyuhyun; Kim Minjae; Park Wonbin; Miyata Haru; Park Seonghyeon	Kim Minjae (▼2)
4	Jang Yonghoon	Suzuki Kaira (▼3)	Jang Yonghoon; Jang Kyuhyun; Baek Junhyuk; Jin Bomin; Park Junhwan; Lee Junseo; Chu Yoochan	Jang Yonghoon; Park Wonbin; Miyata Haru; Jang Kyuhyun; Seok June; Baek Junhyuk; Chu Yoochan	Jang Yonghoon; Jang Kyuhyun; Kim Minjae; Park Wonbin; Miyata Haru; Park Seonghyeon	Chu Yoochan (▲5)
5	Wu Hao	Wu Hao	Jang Yonghoon; Jang Kyuhyun; Baek Junhyuk; Jin Bomin; Park Junhwan; Lee Junseo; Chu Yoochan	Jang Yonghoon; Park Wonbin; Miyata Haru; Jang Kyuhyun; Seok June; Baek Junhyuk; Chu Yoochan	Jang Yonghoon; Jang Kyuhyun; Kim Minjae; Park Wonbin; Miyata Haru; Park Seonghyeon	Lee Taegeon (▲5)
6	Kim Jiyong	Lee Wooju (▲2)	Jang Yonghoon; Jang Kyuhyun; Baek Junhyuk; Jin Bomin; Park Junhwan; Lee Junseo; Chu Yoochan	Jang Yonghoon; Park Wonbin; Miyata Haru; Jang Kyuhyun; Seok June; Baek Junhyuk; Chu Yoochan	Jang Yonghoon; Jang Kyuhyun; Kim Minjae; Park Wonbin; Miyata Haru; Park Seonghyeon	Park Junhwan (▲14)
7	Jang Kyuhyun	Baek Junhyuk (▲8)	Jang Yonghoon; Jang Kyuhyun; Baek Junhyuk; Jin Bomin; Park Junhwan; Lee Junseo; Chu Yoochan	Jang Yonghoon; Park Wonbin; Miyata Haru; Jang Kyuhyun; Seok June; Baek Junhyuk; Chu Yoochan	Jang Yonghoon; Jang Kyuhyun; Kim Minjae; Park Wonbin; Miyata Haru; Park Seonghyeon	Kim Jiyong (▼6)

=== Voting ===
The voting process for Debut's Plan is done through the official website. Voting is permitted once daily, which consists of the selection of a certain number of NewKids to be selected for the final debut assessment. There will be three initial voting periods, cumulative towards the total for the final debut selection, with the first and second being worth 25% each, and the third one being worth 50%. The final voting period consists of the selection of seven NewKids, to form the debut group.

=== Top 7 ===
The top seven contestants are determined either by the judges themselves or through popularity with online voting, and the results are shown at the end of most episodes.

Color key

New to the Top 7 (Note: Indicates contestants who had never placed in the Top 7 in any prior episode, or voting interim tally.)
Returned to Top 7 (Note: Indicates contestants who had placed in the Top 7 in a prior episodem or voting interim tally, then had placed out of it, and then had came back)

Top 7 Contestants After Each Ranking Announcement
#	Ep. 2	Ep. 3	Ep. 4	Ep. 5	Ep. 6	Ep. 7	Ep. 8	Ep. 9
1	Jang Yonghoon	Jang Yonghoon	Jang Yonghoon	Jang Yonghoon	Jang Yonghoon	Jeong Semin (▲2)	Jeong Semin	Kim Minjae (▲2)
2	Jeong Semin	Jeong Semin	Jeong Semin	Wu Hao (▲14)	Jang Kyuhyun (▲5)	Kim Minjae (▲2)	Jang Yonghoon (▲3)	Jang Yonghoon
3	Seok June	Seok June	Kim Minjae (▲2)	Park Wonbin (▲2)	Jeong Semin (▲1)	Jang Kyuhyun (▼1)	Kim Minjae (▼1)	Baek Junhyuk (▲3)
4	Park Wonbin	Park Wonbin	Seok June (▼1)	Jeong Semin (▼2)	Kim Minjae (▲1)	Park Wonbin (▲2)	Jang Kyuhyun (▼1)	Park Wonbin (▲1)
5	Kim Minjae	Kim Minjae	Park Wonbin (▼1)	Kim Minjae (▼2)	Baek Junhyuk (▲7)	Jang Yonghoon (▼4)	Park Wonbin (▼1)	Chu Yoochan (▲8)
6	Kim Jiyong	Kim Jiyong	Jang Kyuhyun (▲3)	Miyata Haru (▲5)	Park Wonbin (▼3)	Wu Hao (▲1)	Baek Junhyuk (▲1)	Jeong Semin (▼5)
7	Miyata Haru	Miyata Haru	Baek Junhyuk (▲6)	Jang Kyuhyun (▼1)	Wu Hao (▼5)	Baek Junhyuk (▼2)	Wu Hao (▼1)	Park Seonghyeon (▲1)

=== First Voting Period ===
The first voting period, worth 25% of the cumulative total for the final debut assessment, took place from March 14, 2025, to April 3, 2025. The public audience would vote for their top seven contestants.

Color key

Top 7

First Voting Period Results
Rank	Contestants	Rank	Contestants	Rank	Contestants
1	Jang Yonghoon	8	Kim Jiyong	15	Chu Yoochan
2	Jeong Semin	9	Jin Bomin	16	Wu Hao
3	Kim Minjae	10	Lee Taegeon	17	Lee Wooju
4	Seok June	11	Miyata Haru	18	Park Seonghyeon
5	Park Wonbin	12	Park Junhwan	19	Kim Yunseo
6	Jang Kyuhyun	13	Lee Junseo	20	Jo Minjae
7	Baek Junhyuk	14	Suzuki Kaira	21	Jeon Junseo

=== Second Voting Period ===
The second voting period, also worth 25% of the cumulative total for the final debut assessment, took place from April 4, 2025, to April 17, 2025. The public audience would vote for their top two contestants.

Color key

Top 7

Second Voting Period Results
Rank	Contestants	Rank	Contestants	Rank	Contestants
1	Jang Yonghoon	8	Lee Taegeon (▲2)	15	Lee Junseo (▼2)
2	Jang Kyuhyun (▲4)	9	Miyata Haru (▲2)	16	Jeon Junseo (▲5)
3	Jeong Semin (▼1)	10	Kim Jiyong (▼2)	17	Park Junhwan (▼5)
4	Kim Minjae (▼1)	11	Park Seonghyeon (▲7)	18	Jo Minjae (▲2)
5	Baek Junhyuk (▲2)	12	Jin Bomin (▼3)	19	Kim Yunseo
6	Park Wonbin (▼1)	13	Chu Yoochan (▲2)	20	Lee Wooju (▼3)
7	Wu Hao (▲9)	14	Suzuki Kaira		

=== Third Voting Period ===
The third voting period, worth 50% of the cumulative total for the final debut assessment, took place from April 18, 2025, to April 24, 2025. The public audience would vote for their one-pick contestants.

=== Pre-Debut Plan Results ===
The contestants who would get to move onto the final are decided by a combination of fan votes, board members' selections, and a potential Debut Super Pass. The top seven contestants in fan votes are automatically going to the final, their scores being cumulative of the initial three voting periods, alongside the members of the NewKids7 chosen by the board members, with room for contestants in both categories to overlap. After however many contestants have been chosen under these two criteria, the board members can choose to use their Debut Super Pass to save one contestant who didn't qualify for either criterion, and they will be able to go to the final as well.

Top 7
Board Members' NewKids7
Top 7 and Board Members' NewKids7
Debut Super Pass

Pre-Debut Plan Results (Note: Compared to Second Voting Period)
Rank	Contestants	Rank	Contestants	Rank	Contestants
1	Jeong Semin (▲2)	8	Park Seonghyeon (▲3)	15	Suzuki Kaira (▼1)
2	Jang Yonghoon (▼1)	9	Lee Taegeon (▼1)	16	Park Junhwan (▲1)
3	Kim Minjae (▲1)	10	Kim Jiyong	17	Jo Minjae (▲1)
4	Jang Kyuhyun (▼2)	11	Jin Bomin (▲1)	18	Lee Wooju (▲2)
5	Park Wonbin (▲1)	12	Miyata Haru (▼3)	19	Kim Yunseo
6	Baek Junhyuk (▼1)	13	Chu Yoochan	20	Jeon Junseo (▼4)
7	Wu Hao	14	Lee Junseo (▲1)		

=== Final Voting Period ===
The final voting period took place from April 26, 2025, to May 3, 2025, which would decide the members of the debut group. The public audience would vote for their ideal final line-up, consisting of seven contestants. The top five members of the group would be decided using these votes, and the board members' scores, each worth 50% of the total score. The other two members of the group would be decided with Save votes, during the final episode livestream. The contestant with the highest vote count, excluding the top five contestants from the previous voting period, would be added to the debut line-up, alongside another contestant chosen by the board members. During the final livestream, after the original seven members were announced, the board members revealed that they would be adding another member to the group with their save vote, resulting in a final group of eight members instead of seven.

Top 5
Fan Save Vote
Board Members' Save Vote

Final Voting Period Results
Rank	Contestants	Rank	Contestants
1	Kim Minjae (▲2)	7	Park Seonghyeon (▲1)
2	Jang Yonghoon	8	Jang Kyuhyun (▼4)
3	Baek Junhyuk (▲3)	9	Lee Taegeon
4	Park Wonbin (▲1)	10	Kim Jiyong
5	Chu Yoochan (▲8)	11	Wu Hao (▼5)
6	Jeong Semin (▼5)	12	Park Junhwan (▲4)

== Discography ==
The theme song "ImPerfect" was recorded and performed by the contestants. It was released on March 14, 2025 on digital music platforms.

=== Singles ===
Title	Year	Album
"ImPerfect"	2025	NewKids on the STARSHIP
"ImPerfect (English ver.)"	2025	NewKids on the STARSHIP
"New A.G.K (Age, Gen, Kids)"	2025	NewKids on the STARSHIP
"DWN"	2025	NewKids on the STARSHIP
"So G.oo.D" (네가 미치도록 좋아)	2025	NewKids on the STARSHIP
"I'm OK, You're OK" (너만 괜찮으면, 난 괜찮아)	2025	NewKids on the STARSHIP
"Pages into Letters" (편지가 된 일기)	2025	NewKids on the STARSHIP <ImPerfect Game> OST
"Eternal Universe" (우주를 이대로)	2025	NewKids on the STARSHIP <ImPerfect Game> OST
"Battle Scars"	2025	NewKids on the STARSHIP <ImPerfect Game> OST
"Balla"	2025	NewKids on the STARSHIP
"Sticky Bomb"	2025	NewKids on the STARSHIP
"Step Up - With My Fluttering Heart" (너를 향한 내 설렘 Step Up)	2025	NewKids on the STARSHIP
"Password" (둘만 아는 Password)	2025	NewKids on the STARSHIP
"Taking Off - Through Your Dreams" (꿈을 꿰뚫는 순간(飛必沖天))	2025	NewKids on the STARSHIP
"Blooming Crown" (꽃피울 Crown)	2025	NewKids on the STARSHIP

== Post-Competition ==
The final group, Idid is managed by Starship Entertainment. The group released their pre-debut single 'Step It Up' on July 24, 2025, and debuted on September 15, 2025, with the extended play 'I Did It'.

- Park Jun-hwan (7th) left the group on June 2, 2025.
Other contestants, other activities
- Some contestants returned to their original groups:
  - Kang Hyun (22nd-33rd) returned to N.TOP.
- Some contestants left Starship Entertainment and joined new companies:
  - Lee Tae-geon (10th), Wu Hao (12th), Jo Min-jae (17th), Lee Woo-ju (18th), Jeon Jun-seo (20th), Cho Eun-chan (22nd-33rd), Park Jun-seong (22nd-33rd), and Shin Jae-ha (22nd-33rd) all left Starship Entertainment.
    - Wu Hao and Cho Eun-chan joined Modhaus. Wu Hao later left in the second half of 2025.
    - Jeon Jun-seo signed with ABM Company.
    - Park Jun-seong joined Jellyfish Entertainment.
    - Shin Jae-ha joined Macaroni Music Entertainment (MME).
- Some contestants will debut or debuted in new boy groups, released music as solo artists, or released music under their groups:
  - Jang Kyu-hyun (9th), Kim Ji-yong (11th), Jin Bo-min (13th), Miyata Haru (14th), Lee Jun-seo (15th), and Suzuki Kaira (16th) are set to debut as members of Starship Entertainment's new boy group, AEN with their first EP A New Era Of Now with the title track 'X to Z (Next To Me)' on August 5, 2026.
  - Wu Hao (12th) debuted as a soloist with his first digital single Me on February 21, 2026, following the pre-release 'Rise to the world'.
  - Cho Eun-chan (22nd-33rd) was revealed as Idntt's 20th member on July 1, 2026. He is set to debut as a member of Idntt's third sub unit, Itsnot5ver with their first mini album Itsnotover on July 13, 2026.
  - Kang Hyun (22nd-33rd) debuted as a member of NYH Entertainment's boy group, N.TOP with their first single album We:Disconnect with the title track 'Stay With U' on August 6, 2025.
  - Shin Jae-ha (22nd-33rd) is set to debut as a member of Macaroni Music Entertainment's new upcoming boy group , AGD sometime in the second half of 2026.
- Some contestants left the idol industry or further expanded their careers in the acting/entertainment industry:
  - Jeon Jun-seo (20th) seems to be working toward a career as an actor under ABM Company.
- Some contestants participated in other survival shows:
  - Park Jun-seong and Shin Jae-ha (22nd-33rd) participated in Mnet's Korean survival show Boys II Planet.
    - They were both eliminated in the second episode after ranking 133rd and 122nd respectively.
