= Idid (group) =

South Korean boy band

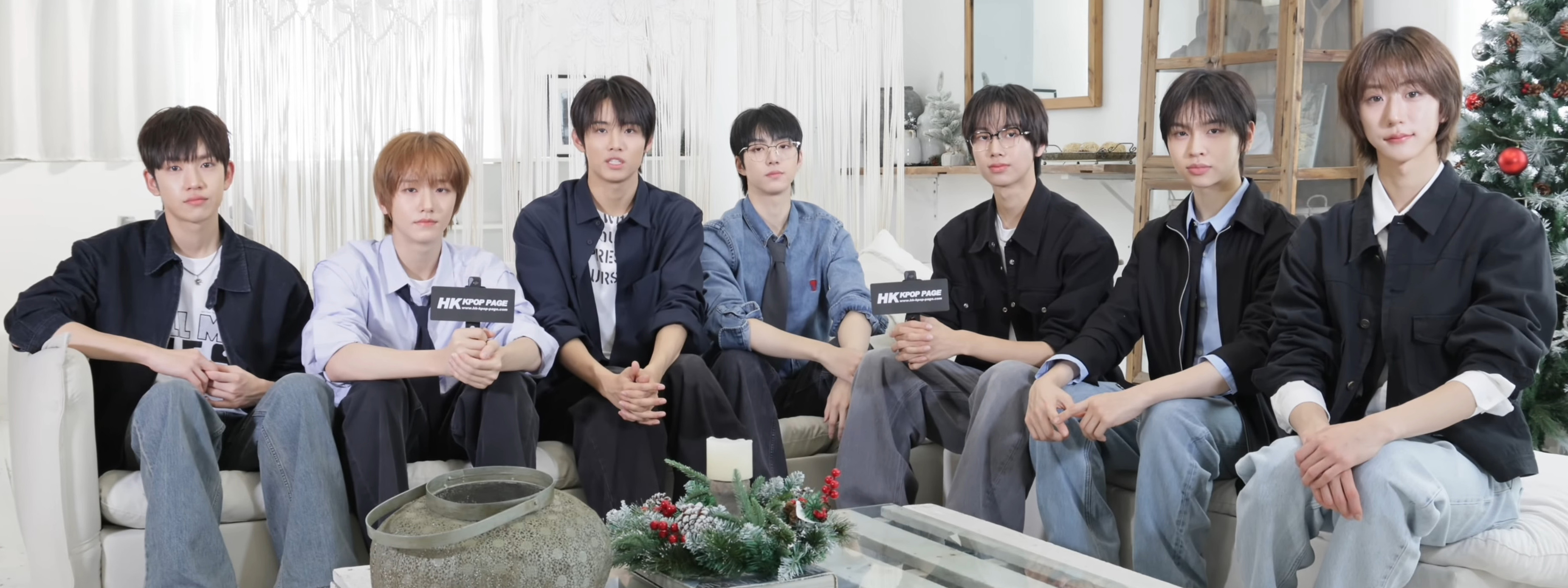
- Idid in 2025; L–R: Kim Min-jae, Jeong Se-min, Jang Yong-hoon, Baek Jun-hyuk, Park Seong-hyeon, Chu Yoo-chan, and Park Won-bin

Background information
- Origin: Seoul, South Korea
- Genre: K-pop
- Years active: 2025–present
- Label: Starship Entertainment
- Members: Jang Yong-hoon; Kim Min-jae; Park Won-bin; Chu Yoo-chan; Park Seong-hyeon; Baek Jun-hyuk; Jeong Se-min
- Past members: Park Jun-hwan

Idid (Korean: 아이딧; RR: Aidit; stylized in all caps) is a South Korean boy group formed by Starship Entertainment's survival show Debut's Plan, becoming their first boy group in five years since Cravity. The group consists of seven members: Jang Yong-hoon, Kim Min-jae, Park Won-bin, Chu Yoo-chan, Park Seong-hyeon, Baek Jun-hyuk and Jeong Se-min. Former member Park Jun-hwan left in June 2025. They debuted on September 15, 2025, with the extended play (EP) I Did It.

== Name ==
The group name 'Idid' stems from "the will to do it" and being able to say "I did it" at the end, being introduced during the final live broadcast of Debut's Plan.

== Career ==
=== 2024–2025: Formation through Debut's Plan ===
Idid was formed through Starship Entertainment's reality competition series Debut's Plan, which aired from March 14 to May 4, 2025. The show had 33 Starship Entertainment trainees compete to debut in their newest boy group since Cravity. Out of the 33 trainees, only the top seven were originally supposed to make the final lineup. All the debut members were announced in the finale episode, which was broadcast live on May 4, 2025, revealing the addition of an eighth member to the group.

=== 2025: Pre-debut, Park Junhwan's departure, debut with I Did It, and Push Back ===
Idid made their first appearance on stage after Debut's Plan as a team of eight on M Countdown on May 15, 2025. They performed "Blooming Crown", one of the original songs from Debut's Plan. The group, still as eight members, appeared on more South Korean music shows throughout the week, visiting Music Bank, Show! Music Core, and Inkigayo. After their promotions as a team of eight, Starship Entertainment announced that Park Jun-hwan had left the group due to mental distress caused by unfounded rumours about his personal life on June 2, all ahead of their official debut.

On July 17, it was announced that Idid would be making their official debut on September 15, with the EP I Did It, alongside its lead single "Chan-Ran" (제멋대로 찬란하게), following the pre-release single "Step It Up" on July 24. "Chan-Ran" earned Idid their first music show trophy 11 days after debut on KBS2's Music Bank on September 26.

Idid made their international debut as part of the August 1–2, 2025 line-up for KCON LA 2025 at the Crypto.com Arena in Los Angeles, California.

On November 7, it was announced that the group's first digital single Push Back would be released on November 20, alongside its similarly titled lead single.

=== 2026–present: "WITHID it.", Fly! ===
On March 11, 2026, Starship Entertainment announced the start of the group's first fan concert "WITHID it." in Seoul, with dates in April. After the initial dates of April 4th and 5th had sold out, on March 26, it was announced that another date; April 3rd, would be added to repay the interest and love of the fandom.

On May 11, it was announced that the group's first single album Fly! would be released on May 27, alongside its similarly titled lead single.

On August 18, Starship Entertainment announced that Idid member Park Seong-hyeon would be taking a temporary hiatus from group activities after a visit to the hospital concerning persistent back pain. The agency stated that they plan to coordinate schedules with the artist's health and recovery as the top priority. Idid will continue its activities and promotions as a six-member group for the time being. He resumed daily life and group activities on September 10, after a period of rest and recovery.

== Members ==
Current

- Jang Yong-hoon (장용훈)
- Kim Min-jae (김민재)
- Park Won-bin (박원빈)
- Chu Yoo-chan (추유찬)
- Park Seong-hyeon (박성현)
- Baek Jun-hyuk (백준혁)
- Jeong Se-min (정세민)

Former

- Park Jun-hwan (박준환)

== Discography ==
=== Extended plays ===
List of extended plays, showing selected details, selected chart positions, and sales figures
Title	Details	Peak chart positions		Sales	Certifications
Title	Details	KOR	JPN	Sales	Certifications
I Did It	Released: September 15, 2025; Label: Starship; Formats: CD, digital download, streaming; Track listing: 1. "Chan-Ran"; 2. "Slow Tide"; 3. "Step It Up"; 4. "ImPerfect"; 5. "So G.oo.D"; 6. "Sticky Bomb"; 7. "Taking Off - Through Your Dreams"; 8. "Blooming Crown"	1	9	KOR: 454,209; JPN: 2,262	KMCA: Platinum

=== Single albums ===
List of single albums, with selected chart positions and sales
Title	Details	Peak chart positions	Sales
Title	Details	KOR	Sales
Fly!	Released: May 27, 2026; Label: Starship; Formats: CD, digital download, streaming; Track listing: 1. "Fly!"; 2. "Attent!on"	30	KOR: 4,276

=== Singles ===
List of singles, showing year released, selected chart positions, and name of the album
Title	Year	Peak chart positions	Album
Title	Year	KOR DL	Album
"Step It Up"	2025	76	I Did It
"Chan-Ran" (제멋대로 찬란하게)	2025	10	I Did It
"Push Back"	2025	17	Non-album single
"Fly!"	2026	4	Fly!

=== Other charted songs ===
List of other charted songs, showing year released, selected chart positions, and name of the album
Title	Year	Peak chart positions	Album
Title	Year	KOR DL	Album
"Slow Tide"	2025	61	I Did It
"ImPerfect"	2025	66	I Did It
"So G.oo.D" (네가 미치도록 좋아)	2025	65	I Did It
"Sticky Bomb"	2025	62	I Did It
"Taking Off – Through Your Dreams" (꿈을 꿰뚫는 순간 (飛必沖天))	2025	63	I Did It
"Blooming Crown" (꽃피울 Crown)	2025	69	I Did It
"Heaven Smiles"	2025	70	Non-album single
"Attent!on"	2026	42	Fly!

== Videography ==
=== Music videos ===
Title	Year	Director(s)	Ref.
"Chan-Ran"	2025	Lee Hye-su and Hong Jae-hwan (Swisher Film)	
"Push Back"	2025	Lee Hye-in (newyear)	
"Fly!"	2026	Han Da-som	

=== Other videos ===
Title	Year	Director(s)	Notes	Ref.
"Step It Up"	2025	Yuann (kidzfrmnowhere)	Performance video	
"Push Back"	2026	Bok (815 video)	Performance videos (2)	
"Attent!on"	2026	Kim Min-jae	Track film	

== Live performances ==
=== Concerts and tours ===
Date	City	Country	Venue	Performed song(s)	Ref.
2026 IDID The 1st FAN-CON [WITHID it.]
April 3, 2026	Seoul	South Korea	Ticketlink 1975 Theater	"Chan-Ran"; "Heaven Smiles"; "Supernatural" (NewJeans cover); "Boy In Luv" (BTS cover); "Step It Up"; "Taking Off - Through Your Dreams"; "Slow Tide"; "So G.oo.D"; "Sticky Bomb"; "Attent!on"; "Push Back"; "ImPerfect"; "Never Goodbye" (NCT Dream cover); "Blooming Crown"	
April 4, 2026	Seoul	South Korea	Ticketlink 1975 Theater	"Chan-Ran"; "Heaven Smiles"; "Supernatural" (NewJeans cover); "Boy In Luv" (BTS cover); "Step It Up"; "Taking Off - Through Your Dreams"; "Slow Tide"; "So G.oo.D"; "Sticky Bomb"; "Attent!on"; "Push Back"; "ImPerfect"; "Never Goodbye" (NCT Dream cover); "Blooming Crown"	
April 5, 2026	Seoul	South Korea	Ticketlink 1975 Theater	"Chan-Ran"; "Heaven Smiles"; "Supernatural" (NewJeans cover); "Boy In Luv" (BTS cover); "Step It Up"; "Taking Off - Through Your Dreams"; "Slow Tide"; "So G.oo.D"; "Sticky Bomb"; "Attent!on"; "Push Back"; "ImPerfect"; "Never Goodbye" (NCT Dream cover); "Blooming Crown"	

=== Music festivals ===
Event	Date	Location (Note: Venue, City, Country)	Performed song(s)	Ref.
2025 SBS Gayo Daejeon Summer	July 26, 2025	KINTEX, Goyang, South Korea	"Step It Up"	
KCON LA 2025	August 1-3, 2025	Crypto.com Arena, Los Angeles, United States	"Step It Up"; "XO (Only If You Say Yes)" (Enhypen cover)	
Music Bank Global Festival 2025	December 14, 2025	Tokyo National Stadium, Tokyo, Japan	"Push Back"; "Chan-Ran"	
2025 SBS Gayo Daejeon Winter	December 25, 2025	Inspire Arena, Incheon, South Korea	"Push Back" (Ice Breaking ver.)	
2025 MBC Gayo Daejejeon	December 31, 2025	MBC Dream Center, Goyang, South Korea	"Chan-Ran"; "Rising Sun" (TVXQ cover)	
M Countdown X Mega Concert 2026	May 30, 2026	Inspire Arena, Incheon, South Korea	"Fly!"; "Push Back"	
Ulsan Summer Festival 2026	June 15, 2026	Taehwagang National Garden, Ulsan, South Korea	"Fly!"	
2026 SBS Gayo Daejeon Summer	August 9, 2026	KINTEX, Goyang, South Korea	"Fly!" (Jam version)	
Caribbean Bay Water Music Pool Party 2026	August 16, 2026	Caribbean Bay, Yongin, South Korea	"Attent!on"; "Slow Tide"; "Push Back"; "Heaven Smiles"; "Fly!"; "Step It Up"	
Inkigayo Live in Tokyo 2026	September 22, 2026	Belluna Dome, Saitama, Japan	"Push Back"; "Fly!"	
SBS Gayo Daejeon 30th Anniversary	December 24, 2026	KINTEX, Goyang, South Korea	TBA	

=== Awards shows ===
Event	Date	Venue	Performed song(s)	Ref.
2025 Korea Grand Music Awards	November 15, 2024	Inspire Arena, Incheon, South Korea	"Chan-Ran"; "Happiness" (H.O.T cover)	
2025 MAMA Awards	November 29, 2025	Kai Tak Stadium, Hong Kong, China	"Push Back" (MAMA ver.); "Boy In Luv" (BTS cover, with KickFlip)	
2025 Melon Music Awards	December 20, 2025	Gocheok Sky Dome, Seoul, South Korea	"Chan-Ran" (MMA ver.); "Push Back" (MMA ver.)	
Asia Star Entertainer Awards 2026	May 17, 2026	Belluna Dome, Saitama, Japan	"Heaven Smiles"; "Push Back"; "Chan-Ran"	
35th Seoul Music Awards	June 20, 2026	Inspire Arena, Incheon, South Korea	"Intro"; "Attent!on"; "Fly!"; "Fake Love" (BTS cover); "We Are the Future" (H.O.T. cover, (Note: Jang Yong-hoon, Kim Min-jae, Baek Jun-hyuk) with Close Your Eyes (Note: Jeon Min-wook, Kenshin, and Seo Kyoung-bae) and Idntt (Note: Towa, Kim Seong-jun and Han Ye-joon))	
2026 K-World Dream Awards	August 27, 2026	KINTEX, Goyang, South Korea	"Fly!"	
2026 SPOTV K-Pop Awards	September 6, 2026	KINTEX, Goyang, South Korea	"Adore U" (Seventeen cover"); "Dance Break" (with Modyssey and POW); "Intro"; "Fly!"	
The Fact Music Awards 2026	September 19, 2026	Busan Asiad Main Stadium, Busan, South Korea	"Intro"; "Fly!"	
2026 Korea Grand Music Awards	November 7, 2026	Gocheok Sky Dome, Seoul, South Korea	"Intro"; "Fly!" (KGMA ver.); "Cherry Bomb" (NCT 127 cover)	
2026 Melon Music Awards	November 14, 2026	Gocheok Sky Dome, Seoul, South Korea	"Fly!" (MMA ver.); "Dance Break" (with AEN)	
11th Asia Artist Awards	December 5, 2026	Kaohsiung National Stadium, Kaohsiung, Taiwan	TBA	

== Filmography ==
=== Reality shows ===
Year	Title	Notes	Ref.
2025	Debut's Plan	Reality competition show determining Idid's members	

== Awards and nominations ==
Name of the award ceremony, year presented, category, nominee of the award, and the result of the nomination
Award ceremony	Year	Category	Nominee / Work	Result	Ref.
MAMA Awards	2025	Artist of the Year	Idid	Nominated	
MAMA Awards	2025	Best New Artist	Idid	Nominated	
Melon Music Awards	2025	Global Rising Artist	Idid	Won	
