= AEN (group) =

South Korean boy band

- Origin: Seoul, South Korea
- Genres: K-pop; J-pop
- Years active: 2026–present
- Labels: Starship; Amuse
- Members: Bomin; Jiyong; Kyuhyun; Haru; Haruto; Junseo; Kaira

AEN (Korean: 에이엔; RR: Eien; acronym for A New Era of Now) is a South Korean-Japanese boy group formed by Starship Entertainment. The group consists of seven members: Bomin, Jiyong, Kyuhyun, Haru, Haruto, Junseo, and Kaira. They debuted on August 5, 2026, with the extended play (EP) A New Era of Now.

== Name ==
The group's name, 'AEN'—short for A New Era of Now, signifies "a new generation that redefines and shapes the present moment". The group name also includes the Japanese meaning of 'eternity', reflecting the group's determination to continuously evolve and grow.

== Career ==
=== Pre-debut, participation in Debut's Plan, and formation ===
In 2025, Starship Entertainment aired their reality competition Debut's Plan, which aired from March 14 to May 4, 2025. The show had 33 Starship Entertainment trainees compete to debut in their newest boy group since Cravity. At the show's conclusion, eight contestants were selected for the final lineup of Idid, who debuted on September 15. Two members of AEN made it to the Top 12 of the show's finale but were unable to debut in the final lineup, which included Kyuhyun and Jiyong, who placed 9th and 11th respectively. The remaining members who would make up the group are Bomin, Haru, Junseo, and Kaira who were eliminated in the semi-final round of the show, placing 13th, 14th, 15th, and 16th, respectively, and a new member, Haruto, who was not present in Debut's Plan.

Later, on June 1, Starship Entertainment announced through SNS that six eliminated contestants from the show alongside one new member would debut under the agency in the second half of 2026.

The group's lineup includes several members with extensive training from Starship Entertainment, including Jiyong who trained for more than five years prior to the show, and Bomin who trained for more than three years.

=== 2026–present: Debut with A New Era of Now ===
On June 1, 2026, Starship Entertainment released AEN's profiles on social media. On June 24, it was announced that AEN would make their official debut on August 5, with the EP A New Era of Now, alongside its lead single "X to Z (Next to Me)", following the pre-release singles "Clockwise" and "Focus on Me" on June 30 and July 8 respectively. The EP features 5 tracks, in both Korean and Japanese, making for a total of 10 tracks.

== Members ==
- Bomin (보민)
- Jiyong (지용)
- Kyuhyun (규현)
- Haru (하루)
- Haruto (하루토)
- Junseo (준서)
- Kaira (카이라)

== Discography ==
=== Extended plays ===
List of extended plays, showing selected details, selected chart positions, and sales figures
| Title | Details | Peak chart positions | | Sales |
| Title | Details | KOR | JPN | Sales |
|---|---|---|---|---|
| A New Era of Now | Released: August 5, 2026; Label: Starship; Formats: CD, digital download, streaming; Track listing: 1. "Clockwise" (Korean ver.); 2. "X to Z (Next to Me)" (Korean ver.); 3. "Focus on Me" (Korean ver.); 4. "Chills" (Korean ver.); 5. "Highfive" (Korean ver.); 6. "Clockwise" (Japanese ver.); 7. "X to Z (Next to Me)" (Japanese ver.); 8. "Focus on Me" (Japanese ver.); 9. "Chills" (Japanese ver.); 10. "Highfive" (Japanese ver.) | 5 | 7 | KOR: 62,868; JPN: 13,419 |

=== Singles ===
List of singles, showing year released, selected chart positions, and name of the album
| Title | Year | Peak chart positions | Album |
| Title | Year | KOR DL | Album |
|---|---|---|---|
| "X to Z (Next to Me)" (Korean ver.) | 2026 | 165 | A New Era of Now |
| "Clockwise" (Japanese ver.) | 2026 | 177 | A New Era of Now |
| "X to Z (Next to Me)" (Japanese ver.) | 2026 | 183 | A New Era of Now |
| "Focus on Me" (Japanese ver.) | 2026 | 174 | A New Era of Now |

=== Other charted songs ===
List of other charted songs, showing year released, selected chart positions, and name of the album
| Title | Year | Peak chart positions | Album |
| Title | Year | KOR DL | Album |
|---|---|---|---|
| "Clockwise" (Korean ver.) | 2026 | 171 | A New Era of Now |
| "Focus on Me" (Korean ver.) | 2026 | 170 | A New Era of Now |
| "Chills" (Korean ver.) | 2026 | 172 | A New Era of Now |
| "Highfive" (Korean ver.) | 2026 | 179 | A New Era of Now |
| "Chills" (Japanese ver.) | 2026 | 181 | A New Era of Now |
| "Highfive" (Japanese ver.) | 2026 | 176 | A New Era of Now |

== Videography ==
=== Music videos ===
| Title | Year | Director(s) | Ref. |
|---|---|---|---|
| "X to Z (Next to Me)" (Japanese ver.) | 2026 | Lafic | |

=== Other videos ===
| Title | Year | Director(s) | Notes | Ref. |
|---|---|---|---|---|
| "X to Z (Next to Me)" (Korean ver.) | 2026 | Han Dae-hee | Performance film | |
| "Highfive" (Korean ver.) | 2026 | Kyuhyun (AEN), AEN | Special video | |
| "Clockwise" (Japanese ver.) | 2026 | Sunny Inspires | Performance film | |
| "X to Z (Next to Me)" (Japanese ver.) | 2026 | — | Performance video | |
| "Focus on Me" (Japanese ver.) | 2026 | Sunny Inspires | Performance film | |

== Live performances ==
=== Music festivals ===
| Event | Date | Location (Note: Venue, City, Country) | Performed song(s) | Ref. |
|---|---|---|---|---|
| Inkigayo Live in Tokyo 2026 | September 23, 2026 | Belluna Dome, Saitama, Japan | "X to Z (Next to Me)" (Japanese ver.) | |
| Rakuten Girls Award 2026 A/W | September 26, 2026 | Makuhari Messe, Chiba, Japan | "X to Z (Next to Me)" (Japanese ver.); "Focus on Me" (Japanese ver.) | |
| The Performance Zero 2026 | October 12, 2026 | Zepp DiverCity, Tokyo, Japan | "X to Z (Next to Me)" (Japanese ver.); "Highfive (Japanese ver.)"; "Focus on Me" (Japanese ver.) | |
| Music Bank Global Festival 2026 | December 13, 2026 | Japan National Stadium, Tokyo, Japan | TBA | |

=== Awards shows ===
| Event | Date | Venue | Performed song(s) | Ref. |
|---|---|---|---|---|
| 2026 Korea Grand Music Awards | November 8, 2026 | Gocheok Sky Dome, Seoul, South Korea | "Clockwise" (Korean ver.); "X to Z (Next to Me)" (Korean ver.) | |
| 2026 Melon Music Awards | November 14, 2026 | Gocheok Sky Dome, Seoul, South Korea | "X to Z (Next to Me)" (Korean ver.) (MMA ver.); "Dance Break" (with Idid) | |
