= Nouera =

South Korean boy band

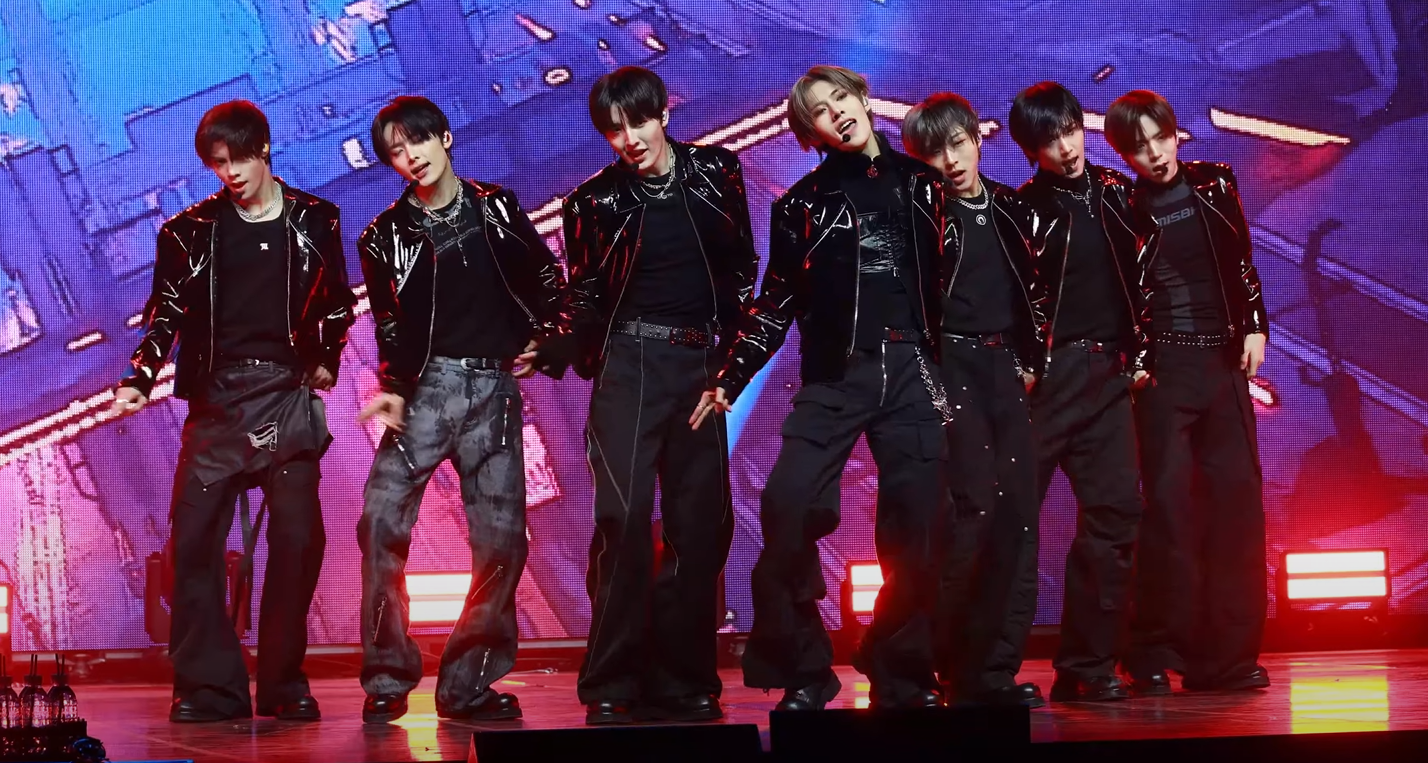
- Nouera in February 2025; L–R: Fan, Lin, Junpyo, Yuseop, Miraku, Gihyeon, Hyunjun

Background information
- Origin: Seoul, South Korea
- Genres: K-pop
- Years active: 2024–present
- Label: Nouer Entertainment
- Members: Gihyeon; Junpyo; Hyunjun; Yuseop; Lin; Fan; Miraku
- Website: nouer-ent.com/NouerA

Nouera (Korean: 누에라; stylized as NouerA) is a South Korean boy band formed through KBS' reality competition program Make Mate 1 and managed by Nouer Entertainment. The group consists of seven members: Gihyeon, Junpyo, Hyunjun, Yuseop, Lin, Fan, and Miraku. They debuted on February 26, 2025, with extended play (EP) Chapter: New Is Now.

== Name ==
According to Nouer Entertainment, the group's name is "a combination of the French words 'nouer', which means 'to tie together,' and 'era', which means 'era'".

== History ==
=== Formation through Make Mate 1 and pre-debut activities ===
Nouera was formed through KBS' reality competition program Make Mate 1, which broadcast from May 15, to July 17, 2024. The show brought 36 contestants, who were not signed to any agency, to compete in the hopes of debuting in a multinational boy group. Out of 36 contestants, only the top seven would make the final lineup. All members were announced in the finale episode, which was broadcast live on July 17, 2024.

On August 5, it was announced that the seven-member boy group formed through MA1 would be called "Nouera" and aimed to make their debut in January 2025. Eight days later, Nouera signed a contract with Nouer Entertainment. On August 20, Nouer announced that the group would held their first fan meeting titled "Thank you MA1: Hello Nouera" at the Toyosu PIT in Tokyo, Japan on September 23. On August 29, Nouera was announced as part of the lineup of the 2024 K-music season "Good Night Concert in Busan", which was held from October 3 to 5 at Haeundae Beach.

On November 6, it was announced that Nouera would be performing on the second day of the 2024 Music Bank Global Festival in Japan, which would held at Mizuho PayPay Dome Fukuoka on December 14 and 15. On November 19, Nouera attended the Billboard No. 1s Party 2024 in Los Angeles, United States, and was named the "2025 K-pop Rookie" by Billboard and Billboard Korea.

On December 9, Nouer released the promotion time table for the group's pre-debut digital single "Infinity" (무한대; 無限大). It was released on December 14, on all global music platforms.

=== 2025–present: Debut with Chapter: New Is Now ===
On February 3, Nouer announced that Nouera will be making their debut on February 26, with the first EP Chapter: New Is Now.

== Members ==
- Gihyeon (기현)
- Junpyo (준표)
- Hyunjun (현준)
- Yuseop (유섭)
- Lin (린)
- Fan (판)
- Miraku (미라쿠)

== Discography ==
=== Extended plays ===
List of albums, showing selected details, selected chart positions, and sales figures
Title	Details	Peak chart positions	Sales
Title	Details	KOR	Sales
Chapter: New Is Now	Released: February 26, 2025; Label: Nouer Entertainment; Formats: CD, digital download, streaming; Track listing: 1. "Sparkle"; 2. "N.I.N (New Is Now)"; 3. "Bring the Crunk"; 4. "Infinity" (무한대; 無限大); 5. "Jet Stream"; 6. "Pairing"	5	KOR: 167,939
N: Number of Cases	Released: June 30, 2025; Label: Nouer Entertainment; Formats: CD, digital download, streaming; Track listing: 1. "Myself"; 2. "N (Number of Cases)"; 3. "Make You Move"; 4. "Warning!"; 5. "Finale"; 6. "BNB (Beauty and the Beast)"	1	KOR: 210,000
Pop It Like	Released: March 9, 2026; Label: Nouer Entertainment; Formats: CD, digital download, streaming; Track listing: 1. "Pop It Like"; 2. "Silhouette"; 3. "A-List"; 4. "We Are Young"	2	KOR: 248,213
.exe	Released: July 27, 2026; Label: Nouer Entertainment; Formats: CD, digital download, streaming; Track listing: 1. ".exe" 2. "Locked In"; 3. "W.T.F(un)"; 4. "Life in Color"	1	KOR: 216,003

=== Singles ===
==== As lead artist ====
Title	Year	Peak chart positions	Album
Title	Year	KOR Down.	Album
"Infinity" (무한대; 無限大)	2024	133	Chapter: New is Now
"N.I.N (New Is Now)"	2025	112	Chapter: New is Now
"N (Number Of Cases)"	2025	117	N:Number of cases
"Pop It Like"	2026	19	Pop It Like
".exe"	2026	—	.exe

== Filmography ==
=== Reality shows ===
Year	Title	Notes	Ref.
2024	Make Mate 1	Reality competition show determining Nouera's members	

=== Web shows ===
Year	Title	Notes	Ref.
2024	Nouera in Noir	6 episodes	

== Awards and nominations ==
Name of the award ceremony, year presented, category, nominee(s) of the award, and the result of the nomination
Award ceremony	Year	Category	Nominee(s)	Result	Ref.
Asia Star Entertainer Awards	2025	Hot Trend	Nouera	Won	
Golden Disc Awards	2025	Rookie Artist of the Year	Nouera	Nominated	
Korea Grand Music Awards	2025	Best Dance Performance	"N.I.N (New is Now)"	Nominated	
Seoul Music Awards	2025	Rookie of the Year	Nouera	Nominated	
