= Make Mate 1 =

South Korean reality competition program

- Also known as: MA1
- Hangul: 메이크메이트원
- RR: Meikeu meiteu won
- MR: Meik'ŭ meit'ŭ wŏn
- Genre: Reality competition
- Developed by: Han Kyung-cheon
- Directed by: Ra Hyun-woong; Hwang Min-gyu; Park Ho-shin; Jang In-hye
- Presented by: Xiumin
- Judges: Solar; Onestar; Kim Sung-eun; Hanhae; Vata; Ingyoo
- Music by: Park Je-joon
- Opening theme: "Time of Our Life" by MA1
- Country of origin: South Korea
- Original language: Korean
- No. of episodes: 10

Production
- Executive producer: Song Joon-young
- Producer: Lee Dong-hoon
- Editor: Kim Woo-hyun
- Production companies: KBS; Makestar; WDM; Golden Eight Media

Original release
- Network: KBS2
- Release: May 15 – July 17, 2024

Related
- The Unit: Idol Rebooting Project

Make Mate 1 (Korean: 메이크메이트원) is a 2024 South Korean reality competition program. It aims to create and debut a global project boy group. It premiered on KBS2 on May 15, 2024, and airs every Wednesday at 22:10 (KST).

It was revealed that the name of the group will be called Nouera, it is derived from the French word "nouer", which means "to tie together", and the English word "era", implying that Nouera's music will connect eras.

== Concept ==
Make Mate 1 captures the process of 36 multinational participants competing toward their dream of becoming idols. The production team said that the 36 people participating this time were boys who lived ordinary lives and did not belong to a specific agency.

== Background and promotion ==
On March 21, 2024, KBS launched Make Mate One, a survival-style audition program to create a global boy group which is scheduled to airs for the first time in May. It has been about 6 years since The Unit: Idol Rebooting Project, which ended in February 2018, that KBS is presenting an idol audition. KBS were also released a poster for the global boy group's debut project through their official SNS account.

For the first time in the history of audition programs, before its release, 36 idols of Mate Make One performed a special halftime performance at the professional basketball DB vs Cheong Kwan Jang match.

On March 27, 2024, Make Mate One social media revealed profiles for 9 people out of 36 everyday.

On March 31, 2024, the first teaser video was uploaded on social media. The project's main theme song was "Time of Our Life" by Day6, a remake from album The Book of Us: Gravity.

== Cast ==
=== Host ===
- Xiumin served as the host of the show.

=== Special host ===
- Lee Gi-kwang served as a special host to announce the start of the program.

=== Judges ===
- Solar, who is trusted and listened to, supports the participants in developing their potential from the perspective of a current idol.

=== Special judges ===
- Oh My Girl's Hyojung (Ep. 1-2)
- Lovelyz's Mijoo (Ep. 1-2)
- Kwon Eun-bi (Ep. 4-5)
- Enhypen's Jungwon, Ni-ki, and Heeseung (Ep. 4-5)
- STAYC's Yoon and Sieun (Ep. 6)
- The Boyz's Sunwoo and Ju Haknyeon (Ep. 6)
- (G)-Idle's Minnie (Ep. 8-9)
- Pentagon's Hui (Ep. 8-9)
- Apink's Park Cho Rong and Kim Nam Joo (Ep. 8-9)

=== Vocal coaches ===
- Lim Han-byul, a guide teacher for vocal skills.
- Kim Seong-eun, a vocal teacher for idols, who provided cool-headed yet warm advice.

=== Dance and rap coaches ===
- The dance coaches include We Dem Boyz' Vata and Ingyoo, who lead K-pop dance with a trendy feel, and the rap coaches include the versatile and talented rapper Hanhae, who is responsible for the trainees' growth and skill improvement.

== Contestants ==
Color key:

Final members of Nouera
Eliminated in the Final Round
Eliminated in Third Round (Third Elimination)
Eliminated in Second Round (Second Elimination)
Eliminated in First Round (First Elimination)
Left the show

36 contestants
Chen Bingfan (빙판)	Lin (린)	Miraku (미라쿠)	Jang Hyun-jun (장현준)	Noh Gi-hyeon (노기현)	Jeon Jun-pyo (전준표)
Han Yu-seop (한유섭)	Kim Si-on (김시온)	Jung Hyun-jun (정현준)	Jia Hao (지아하오)	Takuma (타쿠마)	Jeong Hyeon-uk (정현욱)
Kim Hak-seong (김학성)	An Xin (안신)	Jo Min-jae (조민재)	Seo Yun-deok (서윤덕)	Midori (미도리)	Jung Jae-yong (정재영)
Choi Min-jun (최민준)	07 Kim Seung-ho (김승호)	Shin Won-cheon (신원천)	Seo Ji-ho (서지호)	Yoon Jae-yong (윤재용)	06 Kim Seung-ho (김승호)
Lee Jang-hee (이장희)	Lee Do-ha (이도하)	Ki Hyeong-jun (기형준)	Chen Shiau Fu (첸샤오푸)	Aki (아키)	Kim Sun-yub (김선엽)
Choi Han-gyeol (최한결)	Kai (카이)	Jo Jae-hyeon (조재현)	Yoon Ho-hyeon (윤호현)	Jo Seung-hyeon (조승현)	Kim Se-gon (김세곤)

== Ranking ==
The Top 9 were determined by online and onsite voting, and the C-Mate grades, weighing 40% and 60% respectively. Benefit points were added on every round ranking. Top 10 of pure online votes ranking were only presented on Episodes 0 (Pre-Bias Ranking), 2, 4 and 7 that plays 40% of their Round Rankings. Mission Rankings were presented on Episode 2 and 5 for the Round 1, with Top 10 and 9 Mates respectively. Top 9 Round Ranking were announced on Episode 6, 8. The Final 7 members of the debuting Group were announce on Episode 10

=== Online, Stage and Round Rankings ===
Online	Stage	Round Ranking

New to Top Mate

Rank	Episode 0	Episode 2	Episode 3	Episode 4	Episode 5	Episode 6	Episode 7	Episode 8	Episode 9	Episode 10
Rank	Pre Bias Ranking (Online)	Online	First Stage	Online	Change Mission	Round 1	Online	Round 2	Round 3	Final Round
1	Lin	Lin	Jo Min-jae	Chen Bingfan	Chen Bingfan	Chen Bingfan	Chen Bingfan	Jang Hyun-jun	Jia Hao	Chen Bingfan
2	Chen Bingfan	Chen Bingfan	Jung Hyun-jun	Lin	Jang Hyun-jun	Jang Hyun-jun	Jia Hao	Chen Bingfan	Chen Bingfan	Lin
3	Noh Gi-hyeon	Kim Si-on	Chen Bingfan	Kim Si-on	Takuma	Kim Si-on	Lin	Noh Gi-hyeon	Han Yu-seop	Miraku
4	Kim Si-on	Jung Hyun-jun	Choi Han-gyeol	Jo Min-jae	Kim Seung-ho 07	Lin	Jeon Jun-pyo	Jeon Jun-pyo	Lin	Jang Hyun-jun
5	Chen Shiau Fu	Jia Hao	Kim Seung-ho 07	Jia Hao	Shin Won-cheon	Kim Seung-ho 07	Seo Yun-deok	Lin	Takuma	Noh Gi-hyeon
6	An Xin	An Xin	Yoon Jae-yong	Chen Shiau Fu	Jo Min-jae	Jo Min-jae	Han Yu-seop	Jo Min-jae	Jung Hyun-jun	Jeon Jun-pyo
7	Miraku	Jo Min-jae	Jang Hyun-jun	Han Yu-seop	Jung Hyun-jun	Shin Won-cheon	Jo Min-jae	Han Yu-seop	Jo Min-jae	Han Yu-seop
8	Jang Hyun-jun	Midori	Lin	Seo Yun-deok	Han Yu-seop	Jung Hyun-jun	Kim Hak-seong	Yoon Jae-yong	Jeon Jun-pyo	
9	Jeon Jun-pyo	Miraku	Seo Yun-deok	An Xin	Kim Si-on	Takuma	An Xin	An Xin	Kim Si-on	
10	Han Yu-seop	Noh Gi-hyeon	Noh Gi-hyeon	Lee Do-ha	-	-	Lee Do-ha	-	-	

== Ratings ==
Average TV viewership ratings (Nationwide)
Ep.	Original broadcast date	Average audience share (Nielsen Korea)
1	May 15, 2024	0.6% (68th)
2	May 22, 2024	0.3% (76th)
3	May 29, 2024	0.4% (70th)
4	June 5, 2024	0.4% (71st)
5	June 12, 2024	0.3% (87th)
6	June 19, 2024	0.3% (75th)
7	June 26, 2024	0.4% (69th)
8	July 3, 2024	0.3% (77th)
9	July 10, 2024	0.4% (71st)
10	July 17, 2024	0.3% (84th)
Average		0.4%
In the table above, the blue numbers represent the lowest ratings and the red numbers represent the highest ratings.; This program aired on a cable channel/pay TV which normally has a relatively smaller audience compared to free-to-air TV/public broadcasters (KBS, SBS, MBC, and EBS).

== Post-Competition ==
The final group NouerA, is managed by Nouer Entertainment. The group debuted on February 26, 2025, with extended play (EP) Chapter: New Is Now.

Other contestants
- Some contestants will debut or debuted in new boy groups or released music as solo artists:
  - Takuma (11th), Kim Hak-seong (13th), Shin Won-cheon (21st) debuted in OAK Company's new 6-member boy group, BE BOYS on June 18, 2025 with their 1st mini album BE:1.
  - Jung Jae-young (22nd) set to debut in FCENM's new 6-member boy group, ADAP on 2026.
- Some contestants joined new companies:
  - Jung Hyun-jun (9th), Jia Hao (10th), An Xin (14th) joined Nouer Entertainment.
- Some contestants participated in other survival shows:
  - Jung Hyun-jun (9th), Jia Hao (10th), An Xin (14th) participated in Korean survival show Boys II Planet. Jung Hyun-jun was eliminated in the eighth episode after ranking 47th. Jia Hao and An Xin went on to debut in the winning group ALPHA DRIVE ONE under WakeOne, after ranking in 5th and 2nd place, respectively.
  - Jo Min-jae (15th) participated in Korean survival show Debut's Plan. He was eliminated in the eighth episode after ranking 17th.
  - Yoon Jae-yong (17th) and Midori (18th) participated in Japanese survival show Produce 101 Japan Shinsekai. Jaeyong was eliminated in the 10th episode after ranking 28th. Midori, who competed under his real name Kato Daiki, is set to debut in the winning group KO1KEYZ under LAPONE, as the center of the group after ranking 1st.
