= List of songs written by I.M =

Im Chang-kyun is a South Korean rapper and songwriter, also known by the stage name I.M. He is a member of South Korean boy group Monsta X and has been a credited writer on the majority of their discography. Since Monsta X's debut in 2015, I.M has been involved in songwriting for the group's discography, primarily in writing his raps for all of their albums. In addition to Monsta X's discography, he writes and produces for his solo work and collaborative projects.

Since 2020, the songs he composed for Monsta X have charted on the Billboard World Digital Song Sales chart. For Monsta X's album Fatal Love, the song "Night View", on which he was both a writer and composer for, ranked number thirteen on the chart, without separate promotions or performances, as a single. "Rotate", the song in which he wrote and composed for Monsta X's ninth EP One of a Kind, also placed number thirteen on the chart.

In addition to his work in Monsta X, I.M debuted as a soloist on February 19, 2021 with his self-produced EP Duality, along the title track "God Damn". I.M was noted as showing versatility as an artist and expanding his musical style with his solo EP, when compared to his work in Monsta X. Furthermore, all the tracks from Duality charted on the weekly Billboard World Digital Song Sales chart, accounting for 20% of that week's chart when it was released.

As of December 2025, I.M has a total of 152 writing and producing credits registered with the Korea Music Copyright Association (KOMCA).

== Songs ==
All credits are adapted from the KOMCA, unless stated otherwise.

=== 2015 ===
Artist(s)	Song	Album	Lyrics		Music		Arrangement	
Artist(s)	Song	Album	Credited	With	Credited	With	Credited	With
Mad Clown, Giriboy, Jooyoung (feat. No.Mercy contestants)	"0 (Young)"	No.Mercy OST Part 3	Yes	Jooheon, Mad Clown, Jooyoung, Hong Si-young, George	No	N/A	No	N/A
Monsta X	"No Exit"	Trespass	Yes	Rhymer, Jooheon, Kihyun	Yes	Rhymer, Lissie, Kihyun	No	N/A
Monsta X	"One Love"	Trespass	Yes	Nago, Jooheon	Yes	Nago, Lee Ji-hoon	No	N/A
Monsta X	"Steal Your Heart"	Trespass	Yes	Rhymer, Wonho, Jooheon	No	N/A	No	N/A
Monsta X	"Blue Moon"	Trespass	Yes	Jooheon	Yes	Nago	No	N/A
Monsta X	"Interstellar"	Trespass	Yes	Jooheon, Yella Diamond	No	N/A	No	N/A
Monsta X	"Rush"	Rush	Yes	Giriboy, Jooheon	No	N/A	No	N/A
Monsta X	"Hero"	Rush	Yes	Punch Sound, Rhymer, Jooheon	No	N/A	No	N/A
Monsta X	"Perfect Girl"	Rush	Yes	Esbee, Lissie, 9999, Jooheon	No	N/A	No	N/A
Monsta X	"Broken Heart"	Rush	Yes	Rescue the Beat, Kim Seung-joon, Jooheon	No	N/A	No	N/A
Jooheon (feat. I.M, Sam Ock)	"Flower Cafe"	Flower Cafe	Yes	Jooheon, Sam Ock, A June & J Beat	No	N/A	No	N/A

=== 2016 ===
Artist(s)	Song	Album	Lyrics		Music		Arrangement	
Artist(s)	Song	Album	Credited	With	Credited	With	Credited	With
Monsta X (feat. Wheein of Mamamoo)	"Ex Girl"	The Clan Pt. 1 Lost	Yes	ESBEE, Jooheon	No	N/A	No	N/A
Monsta X	"걸어" (All In)	The Clan Pt. 1 Lost	Yes	ESBEE, Lish, Jooheon, Stereo14, Mad Clown	No	N/A	No	N/A
Monsta X	"네게만 집착해" (Stuck)	The Clan Pt. 1 Lost	Yes	Punch Sound, Seo Ji-eum, Jooheon	No	N/A	No	N/A
Monsta X	"백설탕" (Sweetheart)	The Clan Pt. 1 Lost	Yes	Jooheon, Jeongmin	Yes	Jooheon, Jeongmin	No	N/A
Monsta X	"반칙이야" (Unfair Love)	The Clan Pt. 1 Lost	Yes	Kiggen, Jooheon, Stereo14, Lish, Seo Ji-eum	No	N/A	No	N/A
Monsta X	"Because of U"	The Clan Pt. 1 Lost	Yes	Rescue the Beat, Jooheon	No	N/A	No	N/A
Monsta X	"Fighter"	The Clan Pt. 2 Guilty	Yes	Jam Factory, Jooheon	No	N/A	No	N/A
Monsta X	"Be Quiet"	The Clan Pt. 2 Guilty	Yes	Mafly, Jooheon, Keyfly	No	N/A	No	N/A
Monsta X	"Blind"	The Clan Pt. 2 Guilty	Yes	Giriboy, Jooheon	No	N/A	No	N/A
Monsta X	"Queen"	The Clan Pt. 2 Guilty	Yes	Mafly, Jooheon, Keyfly	No	N/A	No	N/A
Monsta X	"하얀소녀" (White Love)	The Clan Pt. 2 Guilty	Yes	Jooheon	Yes	Ye-Yo!	No	N/A
Monsta X	"Rollercoaster"	The Clan Pt. 2 Guilty	Yes	Trinity, Jooheon	No	N/A	No	N/A
I.M, Brother Su (feat. J.Han)	"Madeline"	Non-album single	Yes	Brother Su, J.Han	No	N/A	No	N/A

=== 2017 ===
Artist(s)	Song	Album	Lyrics		Music		Arrangement	
Artist(s)	Song	Album	Credited	With	Credited	With	Credited	With
Monsta X	"Ready or Not"	The Clan Pt. 2.5: The Final Chapter	Yes	Lish, ESBEE, Stereo14, Jooheon	No	N/A	No	N/A
Monsta X	"아름다워" (Beautiful)	The Clan Pt. 2.5: The Final Chapter	Yes	Galactika, Jooheon	No	N/A	No	N/A
Monsta X	"넘사벽" (Great Wall)	The Clan Pt. 2.5: The Final Chapter	Yes	5$, zomay, Jooheon, Lee Ji-won, Lee Kyung-min, XEPY	No	N/A	No	N/A
Monsta X	"니가 필요해" (Need U)	The Clan Pt. 2.5: The Final Chapter	Yes	Lish, ESBEE, Megatone, Jooheon	No	N/A	No	N/A
Monsta X	"Oi"	The Clan Pt. 2.5: The Final Chapter	Yes	Jooheon, Wonho, Brother Su	No	N/A	No	N/A
Monsta X	"Miss You"	The Clan Pt. 2.5: The Final Chapter	Yes	Ye-Yo!, Jooheon	Yes	Ye-Yo!	Yes	Ye-Yo!
Monsta X	"Calm Down"	The Clan Pt. 2.5: The Final Chapter	Yes	Mafly, Keyfly, Jooheon	No	N/A	No	N/A
Monsta X	"너만 생각해" (All I Do)	The Clan Pt. 2.5: The Final Chapter	Yes	9999, Lish, ESBEE, Jooheon	No	N/A	No	N/A
Monsta X	"5:14 (Last Page)"	The Clan Pt. 2.5: The Final Chapter	Yes	Wonho, Jooheon	No	N/A	No	N/A
Monsta X	"넌 어때" (I'll Be There)	The Clan Pt. 2.5: The Final Chapter	Yes	Wonho, Jooheon	No	N/A	No	N/A
I.M, Jooheon	"Future"	Unreleased, Performance exclusives	Yes	Jooheon	Yes	Ye-Yo!	No	N/A
I.M, Jooheon	"MASAKA"	Unreleased, Performance exclusives	Yes	Jooheon	No	N/A	No	N/A
Monsta X	"Shine Forever"	Shine Forever	Yes	Lish, Stereo14, Jooheon, BiNTAGE	No	N/A	No	N/A
Monsta X	"Gravity"	Shine Forever	Yes	Mafly, Jooheon	No	N/A	No	N/A
Monsta X	"Newton"	Non-album single	Yes	Jooheon, XEPY	No	N/A	No	N/A
Monsta X	"Dramarama"	The Code	Yes	Seo Ji-eum, Seo Jung-a, Jooheon	No	N/A	No	N/A
Monsta X	"Now or Never"	The Code	Yes	Jooheon, Galactika	No	N/A	No	N/A
Monsta X	"From Zero"	The Code	Yes	Wonho, Jooheon, Brother Su	No	N/A	No	N/A
Monsta X	"X"	The Code	Yes	Jooheon, Oh Min-ju	No	N/A	No	N/A
Monsta X	"Tropical Night"	The Code	Yes	Jooheon, Crucial Star	No	N/A	No	N/A
Monsta X	"Deja Vu"	The Code	Yes	Jooheon, JQ, Kan Eun-yu, Kim Hye-jung, Choi Ji-hye	No	N/A	No	N/A

=== 2018 ===
Artist(s)	Song	Album	Lyrics		Music		Arrangement	
Artist(s)	Song	Album	Credited	With	Credited	With	Credited	With
Monsta X	"Jealousy"	The Connect: Dejavu	Yes	Seo Ji-eum, Jooheon	No	N/A	No	N/A
Monsta X	"Destroyer"	The Connect: Dejavu	Yes	JQ, DADA, Jooheon	No	N/A	No	N/A
Monsta X	"Fallin'"	The Connect: Dejavu	Yes	Seo Ji-eum, Jooheon	No	N/A	No	N/A
Monsta X	"Crazy in Love"	The Connect: Dejavu	Yes	Galactika, Jooheon	No	N/A	No	N/A
Monsta X	"Lost in the Dream"	The Connect: Dejavu	Yes	Jung Yoon, Le'mon, Lee Hee-joo, Jooheon	No	N/A	No	N/A
Monsta X	"If Only"	The Connect: Dejavu	Yes	Wonho, Jooheon, Rich Jang	No	N/A	No	N/A
Monsta X	"Special"	The Connect: Dejavu	Yes	Ye-Yo!, Jooheon, Nago	Yes	Ye-Yo!, Nago	Yes	Ye-Yo!, Nago
Monsta X	"Underwater"	Take.1 Are You There?	Yes	Jooheon, Brother Su	No	N/A	No	N/A
Monsta X	"Shoot Out"	Take.1 Are You There?	Yes	Seo Ji-eum, Jooheon	No	N/A	No	N/A
Monsta X	"Heart Attack"	Take.1 Are You There?	Yes	Wonho, Jooheon	No	N/A	No	N/A
Monsta X	"널하다" (I Do Love U)	Take.1 Are You There?	Yes	Jooheon, Minhyuk, Wonho, Kihyun	No	N/A	No	N/A
Monsta X	"어디서 뭐해" (Mohae)	Take.1 Are You There?	Yes	Jooheon, Yoonseok, Wooki	No	N/A	No	N/A
Monsta X	"Oh My!"	Take.1 Are You There?	Yes	Jooheon, Jam Factory	No	N/A	No	N/A
Monsta X	"Myself"	Take.1 Are You There?	Yes	Jooheon, ZAYA	No	N/A	No	N/A
Monsta X	"By My Side"	Take.1 Are You There?	Yes	9F, Jooheon	Yes	9F	Yes	9F
Monsta X	"Spotlight" (Korean ver.)	Take.1 Are You There?	Yes	Wonho, Jooheon	No	N/A	No	N/A
Monsta X	"Shoot Out" (English ver.)	Non-album single	Yes	Seo Ji-eum, Jooheon	No	N/A	No	N/A

=== 2019 ===
Artist(s)	Song	Album	Lyrics		Music		Arrangement	
Artist(s)	Song	Album	Credited	With	Credited	With	Credited	With
Monsta X	"Alligator"	Take.2 We Are Here	Yes	Seo Ji-eum, Joohoney	No	N/A	No	N/A
Monsta X	"악몽" (Ghost)	Take.2 We Are Here	Yes	Jam Factory, Joohoney	No	N/A	No	N/A
Monsta X	"No Reason"	Take.2 We Are Here	Yes	Wonho, Brother Su, Joohoney	No	N/A	No	N/A
Monsta X	"Give Me Dat"	Take.2 We Are Here	Yes	Jung Yoon, Joohoney	No	N/A	No	N/A
Monsta X	"난기류" (Turbulence)	Take.2 We Are Here	Yes	Joohoney, Kim Sol-hee, Shin Sae-rom, JQ	No	N/A	No	N/A
Monsta X	"Rodeo"	Take.2 We Are Here	Yes	Joohoney, Kim Eun-yu, MOLA, TOMBOY, JQ	No	N/A	No	N/A
Monsta X	"Stealer"	Take.2 We Are Here	Yes	Seo Ji-eum, Joohoney, Jam Factory	No	N/A	No	N/A
Monsta X	"Party Time"	Take.2 We Are Here	Yes	Joohoney, Brother Su	No	N/A	No	N/A
Yoonseok (feat. Ken of VIXX)	"On My Way"	Non-album single	Yes	Yoonseok, Ken	No	N/A	No	N/A
I.M, ELHAE	"Horizon"	Horizon	Yes	ELHAE	Yes	ELHAE, Millic	No	N/A
I.M	"Scent"	Horizon	Yes		Yes	PLAYBALL	Yes	PLAYBALL
I.M, Joohoney	"삼박자" (Triple Rhythm)	Unreleased, Performance exclusive	Yes	Joohoney, 9F, Wooki	Yes	Joohoney, 9F, Wooki	Yes	Joohoney, 9F, Wooki
Monsta X (feat. French Montana)	"Who Do U Love?"	All About Luv	Yes	Monsta X, French Montana, Torrey Jake, Conrad Noah Patrick, Henig Daniel Doron	Yes	Monsta X, French Montana, Torrey Jake, Conrad Noah Patrick, Henig Daniel Doron	No	N/A
Monsta X	"Breathe For You"	Monsta X's Puppy Day OST	Yes	Joohoney, Wonho	No	N/A	No	N/A
Monsta X	"Alligator" (Japanese ver.)	Phenomenon	Yes	Joohoney, Seo Ji-eum	No	N/A	No	N/A
Monsta X	"Shoot Out" (Japanese ver.)	Phenomenon	Yes	Joohoney, Seo Ji-eum	No	N/A	No	N/A
Monsta X	"Follow"	Follow: Find You	Yes	Joohoney, Seo Ji-eum, Brother Su	No	N/A	No	N/A
Monsta X	"Monsta Truck"	Follow: Find You	Yes	Joohoney, Brother Su	No	N/A	No	N/A
Monsta X	"U R"	Follow: Find You	Yes	Joohoney, Yoonseok, Wooki	No	N/A	No	N/A
Monsta X	"Disaster"	Follow: Find You	Yes	Joohoney, Flying Lab	No	N/A	No	N/A
Monsta X	"Burn It Up"	Follow: Find You	Yes	Joohoney, Bono, JQ	No	N/A	No	N/A
Monsta X	"Mirror"	Follow: Find You	Yes	Joohoney, Wonho, Brother Su, Shownu	No	N/A	No	N/A
Monsta X	"See You Again"	Follow: Find You	Yes	9F, Joohoney	Yes	9F	Yes	9F
Monsta X	"Middle of the Night"	All About Luv	Yes	Monsta X, Ali Payami, John Mitchell	Yes	Monsta X, Ali Payami, John Mitchell	No	N/A

=== 2020 ===
Artist(s)	Song	Album	Lyrics		Music		Arrangement	
Artist(s)	Song	Album	Credited	With	Credited	With	Credited	With
Monsta X (feat. Pitbull)	"Beside U"	All About Luv	Yes	Monsta X, Armando Perez, Angel Lopez, Daniel Ryan Winsch, Eshy Gazit, Federico Vindver, Timothy Mosley	Yes	Monsta X, Armando Perez, Angel Lopez, Daniel Ryan Winsch, Eshy Gazit, Federico Vindver, Timothy Mosley	No	N/A
I.M, ELHAE	"Need to Know"	Non-album single	Yes	ELHAE	Yes	ELHAE	No	N/A
Monsta X	"Fantasia"	Fantasia X	Yes	Joohoney, Brother Su	No	N/A	No	N/A
Monsta X	"Flow"	Fantasia X	Yes	Joohoney, 9F	Yes	9F	Yes	9F
Monsta X	"Zone"	Fantasia X	Yes	Joohoney, Yoonseok, Wooki	No	N/A	No	N/A
Monsta X	"Chaotic"	Fantasia X	Yes	Joohoney, Flying Lab	No	N/A	No	N/A
Monsta X	"It Ain't Over"	Fantasia X	Yes	Joohoney, Brother Su	No	N/A	No	N/A
Monsta X	"Stand Up"	Fantasia X	Yes	Joohoney, Ye-Yo!	Yes	Ye-Yo!	Yes	Ye-Yo!
Monsta X	"Love Killa"	Fatal Love	Yes	Seo Ji-eum, Joohoney, Jeff Lewis, Andy Su Love	No	N/A	No	N/A
Monsta X	"Gasoline"	Fatal Love	Yes	Flyinglab, Joohoney	No	N/A	No	N/A
Monsta X	"Thriller"	Fatal Love	Yes	Lee Su-ran, danke, Joohoney	No	N/A	No	N/A
Monsta X	"Guess Who"	Fatal Love	Yes	danke, Joohoney	No	N/A	No	N/A
Monsta X	"Beastmode"	Fatal Love	Yes	9F, Eric Nam, Joohoney	Yes	9F, Eric Nam	Yes	9F
Monsta X	"Night View"	Fatal Love	Yes	Joohoney, Yoonseok, Wooki	No	N/A	No	N/A

=== 2021 ===
Artist(s)	Song	Album	Lyrics		Music		Arrangement	
Artist(s)	Song	Album	Credited	With	Credited	With	Credited	With
I.M	"God Damn"	Duality	Yes		Yes	Wooki	Yes	Wooki
I.M	"Howlin'"	Duality	Yes		Yes	Long Drive2, Long Drive1, The Need	Yes	Long Drive2, Long Drive1, The Need
I.M	"Burn"	Duality	Yes		Yes	Long Drive2, Long Drive1	Yes	Long Drive2, Long Drive1
I.M	"Happy to Die"	Duality	Yes		Yes	Wooki	Yes	Wooki
I.M	"시든 꽃" (Flower-ed)	Duality	Yes		Yes	Long Drive2, Long Drive1	Yes	Long Drive2, Long Drive1
Monsta X	"Follow" (Japanese ver.)	Flavors of Love	Yes	Joohoney, Seo Ji-eum, Brother Su	No	N/A	No	N/A
Monsta X	"Fantasia" (Japanese ver.)	Flavors of Love	Yes	Joohoney, Brother Su	No	N/A	No	N/A
Monsta X	"Love Killa" (Japanese ver.)	Flavors of Love	Yes	Joohoney, Seo Ji-eum, Jeff Lewis, Andy Love	No	N/A	No	N/A
Monsta X	"Gambler"	One of a Kind	Yes	Ye-Yo!, Joohoney, Laser, Hwang Yu-bin, Jooyoung	Yes	Ye-Yo!	Yes	Ye-Yo!
Monsta X	"Heaven"	One of a Kind	Yes	Ye-Yo!, Laser, Joohoney	Yes	Ye-Yo!, Laser	Yes	Ye-Yo!
Monsta X	"Addicted"	One of a Kind	Yes	153/Joombas, San, Joohoney	Yes	San, Zenur, Fascinador, PRNCE, Kevin Leinster Jr., Shaquille Rayes, Alawn	Yes	Zenur, Fascinador, PRNCE
Monsta X	"Secrets"	One of a Kind	Yes	Hyungwon, Jantine Annika Heij, Joohoney, Justin Oh	No	N/A	No	N/A
Monsta X	"Rotate"	One of a Kind	Yes	Joohoney, Yoonseok, Wooki	No	N/A	No	N/A
Monsta X	"Livin' It Up" (Korean ver.)	One of a Kind	Yes	Enzu, Mun Sul-li, Joohoney	No	N/A	No	N/A
I.M, Rain, Shownu, Hyungwon, Yujeong and Yuna (Brave Girls), Hongjoong and Yunho (Ateez)	"Summer Taste"	Taste of Korea	Yes	Kim Hong-joong, Kim Chang-rak, Kim Soo-bin	No	N/A	No	N/A
Monsta X	"Kiss or Death"	Non-album single	Yes	Joohoney, Zupiter	No	N/A	No	N/A
I.M	"Loop"	Loop	Yes		Yes	Long Drive2, Long Drive1, The Need	Yes	Long Drive2, Long Drive1, The Need
Monsta X	"Rush Hour"	No Limit	Yes	Joohoney, Ye-Yo!, Laser, Sam Carter, Brother Su	No	N/A	No	N/A
Monsta X	"Autobahn"	No Limit	Yes	Joohoney, Yoonseok, Wooki	Yes	Yoonseok, Wooki	Yes	Yoonseok, Wooki
Monsta X	"Ride with U"	No Limit	Yes	Flying Lab, Joohoney	No	N/A	No	N/A
Monsta X	"Got Me in Chains"	No Limit	Yes	Wkly, Flying Lab, Joohoney	No	N/A	No	N/A
Monsta X	"Just Love"	No Limit	Yes	Joohoney, Yoonseok, Wooki	Yes	Yoonseok, Wooki	Yes	Yoonseok, Wooki
Monsta X	"Mercy"	No Limit	Yes	Hyungwon, Jantine Annika Heij, Joohoney, Justin Oh	No	N/A	No	N/A
Monsta X	"I Got Love"	No Limit	Yes	Joohoney, Ye-Yo!, Laser	No	N/A	No	N/A

=== 2022 ===
Artist(s)	Song	Album	Lyrics		Music		Arrangement	
Artist(s)	Song	Album	Credited	With	Credited	With	Credited	With
Monsta X	"Love"	Shape of Love	Yes	Joohoney, Ye-Yo!, Laser, Roydo, Brother Su	No	N/A	No	N/A
Monsta X	"And"	Shape of Love	Yes	Yoonseok, Wooki	Yes	Yoonseok, Wooki	Yes	Yoonseok, Wooki
Monsta X	"사랑한다" (Saranghanda)	Shape of Love	Yes	Joohoney, Ye-Yo!, Laser	No	N/A	No	N/A
Monsta X	"Wildfire"	Shape of Love	Yes	Joohoney, Hyungwon, Justin Oh, Jantine Annika Heij	Yes	Joohoney, Hyungwon, Justin Oh, Jantine Annika Heij	No	N/A
Heize (feat. I.M)	"Distance"	Undo	Yes	Heize	Yes	Heize, Vibin, Hyesung	No	N/A
I.M	"nvrmnd"	SOULBYSEL Compilation 03	Yes		Yes	Long Drive2, Long Drive1	No	N/A

=== 2023 ===
Artist(s)	Song	Album	Lyrics		Music		Arrangement	
Artist(s)	Song	Album	Credited	With	Credited	With	Credited	With
Monsta X	"Beautiful Liar"	Reason	Yes	Hyungwon, Joohoney, Brother Su, Kim Eung-ju	No	N/A	No	N/A
Monsta X	"Crescendo"	Reason	Yes	Joohoney, Ye-Yo!	No	N/A	No	N/A
Monsta X	"Lone Ranger"	Reason	Yes	Hyungwon, Joohoney, Jantine Annika Heij, Justin Oh	No	N/A	No	N/A
Monsta X	"Deny"	Reason	Yes	Joohoney, Yoonseok, Wooki	Yes	Yoonseok, Wooki	Yes	Yoonseok, Wooki
Monsta X	"It's Okay"	Reason	Yes	Joohoney, Laser, Ye-Yo!	No	N/A	No	N/A
I.M	"Overdrive"	Overdrive	Yes		Yes	Wooki	No	N/A
I.M	"Blame"	Overdrive	Yes		Yes	Long Drive, The Need	No	N/A
I.M	"Dumb"	Overdrive	Yes		Yes	Wooki	No	N/A
I.M	"Habit"	Overdrive	Yes		Yes	Wooki, Yoonseok	No	N/A
I.M	"More"	Overdrive	Yes		Yes	Long Drive	No	N/A
I.M	"Not Sorry"	Overdrive	Yes		Yes	Wooki	No	N/A

=== 2024 ===
Artist(s)	Song	Album	Lyrics		Music		Arrangement	
Artist(s)	Song	Album	Credited	With	Credited	With	Credited	With
I.M (feat. Heize)	"Slowly"	Non-album single	Yes	Heize	Yes	Heize, Wooki	No	N/A
I.M	"Lure"	Off the Beat	Yes		Yes	Long Drive, The Need	Yes	Long Drive, The Need
I.M	"Bust It"	Off the Beat	Yes		Yes	Long Drive, The Need	Yes	Long Drive, The Need
I.M	"XO"	Off the Beat	Yes		Yes	Wooki	No	N/A
I.M	"Skyline"	Off the Beat	Yes		Yes	Long Drive, The Need	Yes	Long Drive, The Need
I.M	"MMI"	Off the Beat	Yes		Yes	Wooki	No	N/A
I.M	"nbdy"	Off the Beat	Yes		Yes	Wooki	No	N/A
Moon Su-jin (feat. I.M)	"Runnin'"	Runnin'	Yes	Moon Su-jin	Yes	Moon Su-jin, Sein	No	N/A

=== 2025 ===
Artist(s)	Song	Album	Lyrics		Music		Arrangement	
Artist(s)	Song	Album	Credited	With	Credited	With	Credited	With
I.M	"Don't Speak"	Non-album single	Yes		Yes	Wooki	No	N/A
Wooki (feat. I.M)	"Mirror"	Antibirth	Yes	Wooki	Yes	Wooki	No	N/A
Monsta X	"Savior"	The X	Yes	Joohoney, Yoonseok, Wooki	Yes	Yoonseok, Wooki	Yes	Yoonseok, Wooki
Monsta X	"Tuscan Leather"	The X	Yes	Joohoney, BK, Ye-Yo!	No	N/A	No	N/A
Monsta X	"Catch Me Now"	The X	Yes	Joohoney, Moon Seol-li	No	N/A	No	N/A
Heize (feat. I.M)	"Love Virus"	Love Virus Pt.1	Yes	Heize, Vin.Chee	Yes	Heize, Akira, Kaizen, Cloud, Vin.Chee	No	N/A
