= Monsta X discography =

Band discography

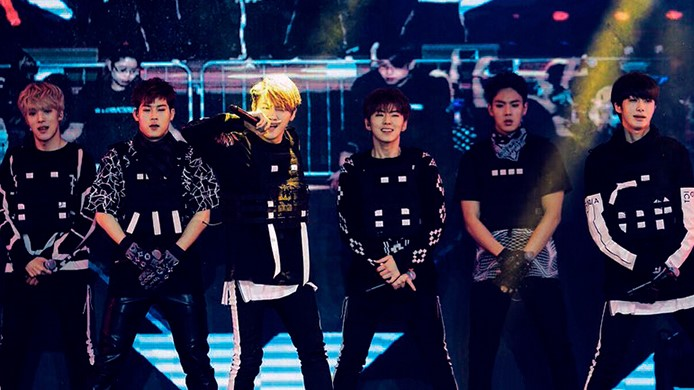
- Monsta X in 2015; Left to right: Minhyuk, Joohoney, I.M, Kihyun, Shownu and Hyungwon
- Studio albums: 10
- EPs: 14
- Soundtrack albums: 9
- Compilation albums: 2
- Singles: 54
- Video albums: 7
- Music videos: 50
- Reissue: 1

South Korean boy group Monsta X had released ten studio albums, one reissue, two compilation albums, fourteen extended plays, and fifty-four singles. They also participated in singing three original soundtracks for several K-dramas, three original soundtracks for web based reality shows, two original soundtracks for animated films, and one original soundtrack for a mobile game.

Produced and managed by Starship Entertainment, they debuted on May 14, 2015 with their extended play Trespass, which peaked at no. 5 on the Gaon Album Chart. The title track "Trespass" peaked at no. 148 on the Gaon Digital Chart.

Monsta X's second extended play Rush was released in September 2015, which contained the group's second lead single of the same name and the follow-up single "Hero".

In 2016, the group released two parts of their The Clan series. Their third extended play The Clan Pt. 1 Lost was released in May 2016 and their fourth extended play The Clan Pt. 2 Guilty was released in October 2016.

In March 2017, The Clan Pt. 2.5: The Final Chapter, the group's first studio album and the final part of The Clan series was released. The lead single "Beautiful" peaked at no. 4 on the weekly Billboard World Digital Song Sales chart. The album was later re-released as Shine Forever and peaked at no. 1 on the weekly Gaon Album Chart. They released their fifth extended play The Code which included the lead single "Dramarama" in November 2017. The EP peaked at no. 1 on the weekly Gaon Album Chart and resulted in the group's first music show win for "Dramarama".

The group's second studio album was released in two parts: Take.1 Are You There? in 2018 and Take.2 We Are Here in 2019. In 2018, the group released their first Japanese-language album Piece, their second Japanese-language album Phenomenon in 2019, and their third Japanese-language album Flavors of Love in 2021.

In February 2020, the group released their first all-English studio album All About Luv, which debuted at no. 5 and no. 7 on the weekly Billboard 200 and Rolling Stone Top 200, respectively. The group released their second all-English studio album The Dreaming in December 2021.

Monsta X has singles in multiple languages other than Korean, just like their first Japanese-language single "Hero" that peaked at no. 2 on the weekly Oricon Singles Chart, and various 2019 collaborations, including Steve Aoki, for the English-language song "Play It Cool", and Sebastián Yatra, for the Spanish and English-language song "Magnetic".

== Albums ==
=== Studio albums ===
List of studio albums, with selected details, chart positions, sales and certifications
| Title | Details | Peak chart positions | | | | | | | | | | Sales | Certifications (Note: In April 2018, Gaon Music Chart introduced music recording certifications for albums, downloads, and streamings that were released and licensed in Korea starting from January 2018 onward.) |
| Title | Details | KOR | BEL | CAN | FRA | JPN | POL | SCO | SPA | SWI | US | Sales | Certifications |
Korean
| The Clan Pt. 2.5: The Final Chapter | Released: March 21, 2017; Label: Starship Entertainment; Formats: CD, digital download, streaming audio | 2 | — | N/A | — (Note: The Clan Pt. 2.5: The Final Chapter did not enter the French Albums Chart, but peaked at number 113 on the French Downloads Albums Chart.) | 38 | — | — | — | — | N/A | KOR: 157,309; JPN: 10,272; US: 1,000+ | N/A |
| Take.1 Are You There? | Released: October 22, 2018; Label: Starship Entertainment; Formats: CD, digital download, streaming audio | 1 | — | N/A | — (Note: Take.1 Are You There? did not enter the French Albums Chart, but peaked at number 92 on the French Downloads Albums Chart.) | 7 | — | — | — | — | N/A | KOR: 250,000+ (Note: To be certified platinum, the album had to sell at least 250,000 units in South Korea.); JPN: 10,592 | KMCA: Platinum |
| Take.2 We Are Here | Released: February 18, 2019; Label: Starship Entertainment; Formats: CD, digital download, streaming audio | 1 | — | N/A | — (Note: Take.2 We Are Here did not enter the French Albums Chart, but peaked at number 84 on the French Downloads Albums Chart.) | 9 | — | — | — | — | N/A | KOR: 254,794; JPN: 10,907 | KMCA: Platinum |
| Fatal Love | Released: November 2, 2020; Label: Starship Entertainment; Formats: CD, digital download, streaming audio | 1 | — | N/A | — | 16 | 21 | — | — | — | N/A | KOR: 321,100; JPN: 4,306 | KMCA: Platinum |
Japanese
| Piece | Released: April 25, 2018; Label: Universal Music Japan; Formats: CD, digital download, CD+DVD, streaming audio | N/A | — | N/A | — | 3 | — | — | — | — | N/A | JPN: 55,042 | |
| Phenomenon | Released: August 21, 2019; Label: Universal Music Japan; Formats: CD, digital download, CD+DVD, streaming audio | N/A | — | N/A | — | 2 | — | — | — | — | N/A | JPN: 56,244 | |
| Flavors of Love | Released: May 5, 2021; Label: Universal Music Japan; Formats: CD, digital download, CD+DVD, streaming audio | N/A | — | N/A | — | 2 | — | — | — | — | N/A | JPN: 22,533 | |
English
| All About Luv | Released: February 14, 2020; Label: Epic; Formats: CD, LP, digital download, streaming audio | N/A | 127 | 10 | 63 | 18 | 18 | 54 | 16 | 36 | 5 | JPN: 1,365; US: 200,000+ | |
| The Dreaming | Released: December 10, 2021; Label: Intertwine; Formats: CD, LP, digital download, streaming audio | N/A | 187 | 76 | 116 | — | — | 72 | — | 50 | 21 | US: 29,500 | |
| Unfold | Released: April 3, 2026; Label: Intertwine; Formats: CD, LP, digital download, streaming audio | 17 | — | — | — | — | — | — | — | — | 41 | KOR: 20,396 | |
"—" denotes releases that did not chart or were not released in that region.

=== Reissue ===
List of reissues, with selected details, chart positions and sales
| Title | Details | Peak chart positions | | Sales |
| Title | Details | KOR | US World | Sales |
|---|---|---|---|---|
| Shine Forever | Released: June 19, 2017; Label: Starship Entertainment; Formats: CD, digital download, streaming audio | 1 | 10 | KOR: 84,563 |

=== Compilation albums ===
List of compilation albums, with selected details
| Title | Details |
|---|---|
| Now Project Vol.1 | Released: May 14, 2025; Label: Starship Entertainment; Formats: Digital download, streaming audio |
| Now Project Vol.2 | Released: September 26, 2026; Label: Starship Entertainment; Formats: Digital download, streaming audio |

== Extended plays ==
List of extended plays, with selected details, chart positions, sales and certifications
| Title | Details | Peak chart positions | | | | | | | | | Sales | Certifications |
| Title | Details | KOR | JPN | JPN Hot | NZ Heat. | POL | US | US Heat. | US Ind. | US World | Sales | Certifications |
|---|---|---|---|---|---|---|---|---|---|---|---|---|
| Trespass | Released: May 14, 2015; Label: Starship Entertainment; Formats: CD, digital download, streaming audio | 5 | — | — | — | — | — | — | — | — | KOR: 41,593 | N/A |
| Rush | Released: September 7, 2015; Label: Starship Entertainment; Formats: CD, digital download, streaming audio | 3 | — | — | — | — | — | — | — | — | KOR: 78,744 | N/A |
| The Clan Pt. 1 Lost | Released: May 18, 2016; Label: Starship Entertainment; Formats: CD, digital download, streaming audio | 3 | 37 | — | — | — | — | — | — | 5 | KOR: 106,805 | N/A |
| The Clan Pt. 2 Guilty | Released: October 4, 2016; Label: Starship Entertainment; Formats: CD, digital download, streaming audio | 2 | — | 77 | — | — | — | 16 | — | 3 | KOR: 105,972 | N/A |
| The Code | Released: November 7, 2017; Label: Starship Entertainment; Formats: CD, digital download, streaming audio | 1 | 16 | 57 | — | — | — | 12 | — | 2 | KOR: 175,902; JPN: 5,006 | N/A |
| The Connect: Dejavu | Released: March 26, 2018; Label: Starship Entertainment; Formats: CD, digital download, streaming audio | 2 | 23 | 67 | 2 | — | — | 8 | 20 | 2 | KOR: 195,762; JPN: 4,714; US: 2,000+ | |
| Follow: Find You | Released: October 28, 2019; Label: Starship Entertainment; Formats: CD, digital download, streaming audio | 1 | 9 | 44 | — | 37 | — | 15 | 42 | 7 | KOR: 266,819; JPN: 9,785; US: 1,000 | KMCA: Platinum |
| Fantasia X | Released: May 26, 2020; Label: Starship Entertainment; Formats: CD, digital download, streaming audio | 2 | 17 | 40 | N/A | — | — | N/A (Note: As All About Luv entered the Billboard 200, all the succeeding albums are no longer eligible in this chart.) | N/A (Note: All releases under US major record labels are no longer eligible in this chart.) | 5 | KOR: 271,263; JPN: 2,282 | KMCA: Platinum |
| One of a Kind | Released: June 1, 2021; Label: Starship Entertainment; Formats: CD, digital download, streaming audio | 3 | 10 | 79 | N/A | 29 | — | N/A | N/A | — | KOR: 380,702; JPN: 4,641 | KMCA: Platinum |
| No Limit | Released: November 19, 2021; Label: Starship Entertainment; Formats: CD, digital download, streaming audio | 1 | 34 | — | N/A | — | — | N/A | N/A | — | KOR: 456,266; JPN: 2,651 | KMCA: Platinum |
| Shape of Love | Released: April 26, 2022; Label: Starship Entertainment; Formats: CD, digital download, streaming audio | 1 | 8 | — | N/A | — | — | N/A | N/A | — | KOR: 454,440; JPN: 1,915 | KMCA: Platinum |
| Reason | Released: January 9, 2023; Label: Starship Entertainment; Formats: CD, cassette, digital download, streaming audio | 1 | — | 73 | N/A | — | — | N/A | N/A | — | KOR: 438,274 | KMCA: Platinum |
| The X | Released: September 1, 2025; Label: Starship Entertainment; Formats: CD, digital download, streaming audio | 5 | 14 | — | N/A | — | 31 | N/A | N/A | 3 | KOR: 441,166; JPN: 8,401 | KMCA: Platinum |
| The Phase | Released: September 4, 2026; Label: Starship Entertainment; Formats: CD, digital download, streaming audio | 1 | 50 | — | N/A | — | 118 | N/A | N/A | 3 | KOR: 260,590 | |
"—" denotes releases that did not chart or were not released in that region.

== Singles ==
=== As lead artist ===
List of singles, showing year released, chart positions, sales, certifications and album name
| Title | Year | Peak chart positions | | | | | | Sales (Note: Sales figures for tracks are based on digital downloads, except noted.) | Certifications | Album |
| Title | Year | KOR | KOR Songs (Note: It includes the K-pop Hot 100 (defunct as of 2022) and the South Korea Songs (2022 onward) as part of the Hits of the World series.) | JPN | JPN Hot | US Pop | US World | Sales | Certifications | Album |
Korean
| "Trespass" (무단침입) | 2015 | 148 | N/A | N/A | — | N/A | 14 | KOR: 22,317 | N/A | Trespass |
| "Rush" (신속히) | 2015 | 139 | N/A | N/A | — | N/A | 15 | KOR: 20,090 | N/A | Rush |
| "Hero" | 2015 | — | N/A | N/A | — | N/A | 12 | KOR: 9,014 | N/A | Rush |
| "Ex Girl" (feat. Wheein of Mamamoo) | 2016 | 118 | N/A | N/A | — | N/A | — | KOR: 23,301 | N/A | The Clan Pt. 1 Lost |
| "All In" (걸어) | 2016 | 159 | N/A | N/A | — | N/A | 6 | KOR: 15,614 | N/A | The Clan Pt. 1 Lost |
| "Fighter" | 2016 | — | N/A | N/A | — | N/A | 8 | KOR: 8,871 | N/A | The Clan Pt. 2 Guilty |
| "Beautiful" (아름다워) | 2017 | — | N/A | N/A | — | N/A | 4 | KOR: 14,394; US: 1,000 | N/A | The Clan Pt. 2.5: The Final Chapter |
| "Shine Forever" | 2017 | — | — | N/A | — | N/A | 4 | US: 2,000 | N/A | Shine Forever |
| "Dramarama" | 2017 | — | — | N/A | — | N/A | 7 | Undisclosed | N/A | The Code |
| "Lonely Christmas" | 2017 | — | — | N/A | — | N/A | — | Undisclosed | N/A | Non-album single |
| "Jealousy" | 2018 | — (Note: "Jealousy" did not enter on the Digital Chart but appeared at number 54 on the component Download Chart.) | 48 | N/A | 52 | N/A | 4 | US: 1,000 | | The Connect: Dejavu |
| "Shoot Out" | 2018 | — (Note: "Shoot Out" did not enter on the Digital Chart but appeared at number 41 on the component Download Chart.) | 23 | N/A | — | N/A | 6 | Undisclosed | | Take.1 Are You There? |
| "Alligator" | 2019 | 133 | 21 | N/A | 41 | N/A | 5 | Undisclosed | | Take.2 We Are Here |
| "Find You" | 2019 | — (Note: "Find You" did not enter on the Digital Chart but appeared at number 142 on the component Download Chart.) | — | N/A | — | N/A | 21 | Undisclosed | | Follow: Find You |
| "Follow" | 2019 | — (Note: "Follow" did not enter on the Digital Chart but appeared at number 52 on the component Download Chart.) | 96 | N/A | 68 | N/A | 5 | US: 1,000 | | Follow: Find You |
| "Fantasia" | 2020 | 117 | — | N/A | 81 | N/A | 11 | Undisclosed | | Fantasia X |
| "Love Killa" | 2020 | 135 | 87 | N/A | — | N/A | 14 | Undisclosed | | Fatal Love |
| "Gambler" | 2021 | 118 | — | N/A | — | N/A | 5 | Undisclosed | | One of a Kind |
| "Rush Hour" | 2021 | 75 | 69 | N/A | — | N/A | 11 | Undisclosed | | No Limit |
| "Love" | 2022 | 60 | N/A | N/A | — | N/A | 10 | Undisclosed | | Shape of Love |
| "Beautiful Liar" | 2023 | 15 | N/A | N/A | — | N/A | 8 | Undisclosed | | Reason |
| "Do What I Want" | 2025 | — (Note: "Do What I Want" did not enter on the Digital Chart but appeared at number 12 on the component Download Chart.) | — | N/A | — | N/A | — | Undisclosed | | The X |
| "N the Front" | 2025 | 65 | — | N/A | — | N/A | — | Undisclosed | | The X |
| "Magic" | 2026 | 53 | — | N/A | — | N/A | — | Undisclosed | | The Phase |
Japanese
| "Hero" | 2017 | — | — | 2 | 3 | N/A | — | JPN: 69,713 (Phy.) | | Piece |
| "Beautiful" | 2017 | — | — | 2 | 4 | N/A | — | JPN: 68,218 (Phy.) | | Piece |
| "Spotlight" | 2018 | — | — | 2 | 2 | N/A | — | JPN: 94,651 (Phy.) | RIAJ: Gold | Piece |
| "Livin' It Up" | 2018 | — | — | 3 | 3 | N/A | — | JPN: 126,895 (Phy.) | RIAJ: Gold | Phenomenon |
| "Shoot Out" | 2019 | — | — | 2 | 2 | N/A | — | JPN: 158,089 (Phy.) | RIAJ: Gold | Phenomenon |
| "Alligator" | 2019 | — | — | 2 | 2 | N/A | — | JPN: 170,292 (Phy.) | RIAJ: Gold | Phenomenon |
| "Wish on the Same Sky" | 2020 | — | — | 2 | 7 | N/A | — | JPN: 75,736 (Phy.) | | Flavors of Love |
| "Love Killa" | 2020 | — | — | 8 | 36 | N/A | — | JPN: 28,175 (Phy.) | | Flavors of Love |
| "Wanted" | 2021 | — | — | 2 | 24 | N/A | — | JPN: 43,556 (Phy.) | | Flavors of Love |
English (Note: It only includes tracks which are originally written in English language and not an English version.)
| "Who Do U Love?" (featuring French Montana) | 2019 | — | — | N/A | — | 26 | N/A | Undisclosed | | All About Luv |
| "Love U" | 2019 | — | — | N/A | — | — | N/A | Undisclosed | | All About Luv |
| "Someone's Someone" | 2019 | — | — | N/A | — | — | N/A | Undisclosed | | All About Luv |
| "Middle of the Night" | 2019 | — | — | N/A | — | — | N/A | Undisclosed | | All About Luv |
| "You Can't Hold My Heart" | 2020 | — | — | N/A | — | 40 | N/A | Undisclosed | | All About Luv |
| "One Day" | 2021 | — (Note: "One Day" did not enter on the Digital Chart but appeared at number 118 on the component Download Chart.) | — | N/A | — | 30 | N/A | Undisclosed | | The Dreaming |
| "You Problem" | 2021 | — (Note: "You Problem" did not enter on the Digital Chart but appeared at number 140 on the component Download Chart.) | — | N/A | — | — | N/A | Undisclosed | | The Dreaming |
| "Baby Blue" | 2025 | — | — | N/A | — | — | N/A | Undisclosed | | Unfold |
| "Growing Pains" | 2026 | — | — | N/A | — | — | N/A | Undisclosed | | Unfold |
| "Heal" | 2026 | — | — | N/A | — | 33 | N/A | Undisclosed | | Unfold |
"—" denotes releases that did not chart or were not released in that region.

=== Collaborative singles ===
List of collaborative singles, showing year released, chart positions, sales and album name
| Title | Year | Peak chart positions | | Sales | Album |
| Title | Year | KOR | US Dance | Sales | Album |
Korean
| "Softly" (with other artists from Starship Entertainment) | 2015 | 24 | N/A | KOR: 154,049 | Starship Planet 2015 |
| "Do Better" (with WJSN) | 2016 | — | N/A | Undisclosed | Non-album single |
| "Christmas Day" (with other artists from Starship Entertainment) | 2017 | 63 | N/A | KOR: 49,521 | Starship Planet 2017 |
| "Christmas Time" (with other artists from Starship Entertainment) | 2018 | 93 | N/A | Undisclosed | Starship Planet 2018 |
English
| "Play It Cool" (with Steve Aoki) | 2019 | — | 20 | Undisclosed | Neon Future IV |
| "Magnetic" (Note: "Magnetic" has a mixture of Spanish and English lyrics.) (with Sebastián Yatra) | 2019 | — | N/A | Undisclosed | Non-album single |
| "Late Night Feels" (with Sam Feldt) | 2022 | — (Note: "Late Night Feels" did not enter on the Digital Chart but appeared at number 135 on the component Download Chart.) | N/A | Undisclosed | Non-album single |
| "Swing" (with Play-N-Skillz, Lil Jon feat. Bun B and Symba) | 2023 | — | N/A | Undisclosed | Non-album single |
"—" denotes releases that did not chart or were not released in that region.

=== Promotional singles ===
List of promotional singles, showing year released, chart positions, sales and album name
| Title | Year | Peak chart positions | | Sales | Album |
| Title | Year | KOR | US World | Sales | Album |
|---|---|---|---|---|---|
| "Newton" (Note: "Newton" was released as a promotional single in collaboration with Lipton.) | 2017 | — | 8 | Undisclosed | Non-album single |
| "Kiss or Death" (Note: "Kiss or Death" was released as a promotional single in collaboration with Universe.) | 2021 | — (Note: "Kiss or Death" did not enter on the Digital Chart but appeared at number 72 on the component Download Chart.) | 11 | Undisclosed | Non-album single |
| "If with U" (Note: "If with U" was released as a promotional single in collaboration with Universe.) | 2022 | — (Note: "If with U" did not enter on the Digital Chart but appeared at number 96 on the component Download Chart.) | — | Undisclosed | Non-album single |
"—" denotes releases that did not chart or were not released in that region.

== Other charted songs ==
List of other charted songs, showing year released, chart positions, sales and album name
| Title | Year | Peak chart positions | | Sales | Album |
| Title | Year | KOR | US World | Sales | Album |
|---|---|---|---|---|---|
| "Stuck" | 2016 | — | 11 | Undisclosed | The Clan Pt. 1 Lost |
| "Be Quiet" | 2016 | — | 14 | Undisclosed | The Clan Pt. 2 Guilty |
| "Ready or Not" | 2017 | — | 19 | Undisclosed | The Clan Pt. 2.5: The Final Chapter |
| "Gravity" | 2017 | — | 7 | Undisclosed | Shine Forever |
| "From Zero" | 2017 | — | 1 | US: 3,000 | The Code |
| "I Do Love U" (널하다) | 2018 | — | 5 | Undisclosed | Take.1 Are You There? |
| "Myself" | 2018 | — | 18 | Undisclosed | Take.1 Are You There? |
| "Ghost" (악몽) | 2019 | — (Note: "Ghost" (악몽) did not enter on the Digital Chart but appeared at number 186 on the component Download Chart.) | — | Undisclosed | Take.2 We Are Here |
| "Play It Cool" (Note: The song charted is in Korean version.) (with Steve Aoki) | 2019 | — (Note: "Play It Cool" did not enter on the Digital Chart but appeared at number 168 on the component Download Chart.) | — | Undisclosed | Take.2 We Are Here |
| "No Reason" | 2019 | — (Note: "No Reason" did not enter on the Digital Chart but appeared at number 165 on the component Download Chart.) | — | Undisclosed | Take.2 We Are Here |
| "Turbulence" (난기류) | 2019 | — (Note: "Turbulence" (난기류) did not enter on the Digital Chart but appeared at number 198 on the component Download Chart.) | — | Undisclosed | Take.2 We Are Here |
| "Rodeo" | 2019 | — (Note: "Rodeo" did not enter on the Digital Chart but appeared at number 199 on the component Download Chart.) | — | Undisclosed | Take.2 We Are Here |
| "Party Time" | 2019 | — (Note: "Party Time" did not enter on the Digital Chart but appeared at number 196 on the component Download Chart.) | — | Undisclosed | Take.2 We Are Here |
| "Monsta Truck" | 2019 | — (Note: "Monsta Truck" did not enter on the Digital Chart but appeared at number 182 on the component Download Chart.) | — | Undisclosed | Follow: Find You |
| "U R" | 2019 | — (Note: "U R" did not enter on the Digital Chart but appeared at number 184 on the component Download Chart.) | — | Undisclosed | Follow: Find You |
| "Disaster" | 2019 | — (Note: "Disaster" did not enter on the Digital Chart but appeared at number 195 on the component Download Chart.) | — | Undisclosed | Follow: Find You |
| "Burn It Up" | 2019 | — (Note: "Burn It Up" did not enter on the Digital Chart but appeared at number 189 on the component Download Chart.) | — | Undisclosed | Follow: Find You |
| "Mirror" | 2019 | — (Note: "Mirror" did not enter on the Digital Chart but appeared at number 196 on the component Download Chart.) | 20 | Undisclosed | Follow: Find You |
| "See You Again" | 2019 | — (Note: "See You Again" did not enter on the Digital Chart but appeared at number 190 on the component Download Chart.) | — | Undisclosed | Follow: Find You |
| "Flow" | 2020 | — (Note: "Flow" did not enter on the Digital Chart but appeared at number 99 on the component Download Chart.) | — | Undisclosed | Fantasia X |
| "Zone" | 2020 | — (Note: "Zone" did not enter on the Digital Chart but appeared at number 104 on the component Download Chart.) | — | Undisclosed | Fantasia X |
| "Chaotic" | 2020 | — (Note: "Chaotic" did not enter on the Digital Chart but appeared at number 112 on the component Download Chart.) | — | Undisclosed | Fantasia X |
| "Beautiful Night" | 2020 | — (Note: "Beautiful Night" did not enter on the Digital Chart but appeared at number 106 on the component Download Chart.) | — | Undisclosed | Fantasia X |
| "It Ain't Over" | 2020 | — (Note: "It Ain't Over" did not enter on the Digital Chart but appeared at number 115 on the component Download Chart.) | — | Undisclosed | Fantasia X |
| "Stand Up" | 2020 | — (Note: "Stand Up" did not enter on the Digital Chart but appeared at number 102 on the component Download Chart.) | 25 | Undisclosed | Fantasia X |
| "Gasoline" (갈증) | 2020 | — (Note: "Gasoline" (갈증) did not enter on the Digital Chart but appeared at number 176 on the component Download Chart.) | — | Undisclosed | Fatal Love |
| "Thriller" | 2020 | — (Note: "Thriller" did not enter on the Digital Chart but appeared at number 180 on the component Download Chart.) | — | Undisclosed | Fatal Love |
| "Guess Who" | 2020 | — (Note: "Guess Who" did not enter on the Digital Chart but appeared at number 199 on the component Download Chart.) | — | Undisclosed | Fatal Love |
| "Nobody Else" | 2020 | — (Note: "Nobody Else" did not enter on the Digital Chart but appeared at number 188 on the component Download Chart.) | 10 | Undisclosed | Fatal Love |
| "Beastmode" | 2020 | — (Note: "Beastmode" did not enter on the Digital Chart but appeared at number 173 on the component Download Chart.) | — | Undisclosed | Fatal Love |
| "Stand Together" (대동단결) | 2020 | — (Note: "Stand Together" (대동단결) did not enter on the Digital Chart but appeared at number 189 on the component Download Chart.) | — | Undisclosed | Fatal Love |
| "Night View" | 2020 | — (Note: "Night View" did not enter on the Digital Chart but appeared at number 181 on the component Download Chart.) | 13 | Undisclosed | Fatal Love |
| "Last Carnival" | 2020 | — (Note: "Last Carnival" did not enter on the Digital Chart but appeared at number 191 on the component Download Chart.) | — | Undisclosed | Fatal Love |
| "Sorry I'm Not Sorry" | 2020 | — (Note: "Sorry I'm Not Sorry" did not enter on the Digital Chart but appeared at number 170 on the component Download Chart.) | — | Undisclosed | Fatal Love |
| "Heaven" | 2021 | — (Note: "Heaven" did not enter on the Digital Chart but appeared at number 66 on the component Download Chart.) | 15 | Undisclosed | One of a Kind |
| "Addicted" | 2021 | — (Note: "Addicted" did not enter on the Digital Chart but appeared at number 71 on the component Download Chart.) | 11 | Undisclosed | One of a Kind |
| "Secrets" | 2021 | — (Note: "Secrets" did not enter on the Digital Chart but appeared at number 74 on the component Download Chart.) | 12 | Undisclosed | One of a Kind |
| "Bebe" | 2021 | — (Note: "Bebe" did not enter on the Digital Chart but appeared at number 72 on the component Download Chart.) | 16 | Undisclosed | One of a Kind |
| "Rotate" | 2021 | — (Note: "Rotate" did not enter on the Digital Chart but appeared at number 73 on the component Download Chart.) | 13 | Undisclosed | One of a Kind |
| "Livin' It Up" | 2021 | — (Note: "Livin' It Up" did not enter on the Digital Chart but appeared at number 70 on the component Download Chart.) | 14 | Undisclosed | One of a Kind |
| "Autobahn" | 2021 | — (Note: "Autobahn" did not enter on the Digital Chart but appeared at number 55 on the component Download Chart.) | — | Undisclosed | No Limit |
| "Ride with U" | 2021 | — (Note: "Ride with U" did not enter on the Digital Chart but appeared at number 59 on the component Download Chart.) | — | Undisclosed | No Limit |
| "Got Me in Chains" | 2021 | — (Note: "Got Me in Chains" did not enter on the Digital Chart but appeared at number 67 on the component Download Chart.) | — | Undisclosed | No Limit |
| "Just Love" | 2021 | — (Note: "Just Love" did not enter on the Digital Chart but appeared at number 62 on the component Download Chart.) | — | Undisclosed | No Limit |
| "Mercy" | 2021 | — (Note: "Mercy" did not enter on the Digital Chart but appeared at number 64 on the component Download Chart.) | — | Undisclosed | No Limit |
| "I Got Love" | 2021 | — (Note: "I Got Love" did not enter on the Digital Chart but appeared at number 65 on the component Download Chart.) | — | Undisclosed | No Limit |
| "Burning Up" (feat. R3hab) | 2022 | — (Note: "Burning Up" did not enter on the Digital Chart but appeared at number 32 on the component Download Chart.) | — | Undisclosed | Shape of Love |
| "Breathe" | 2022 | — (Note: "Breathe" did not enter on the Digital Chart but appeared at number 42 on the component Download Chart.) | — | Undisclosed | Shape of Love |
| "Wildfire" | 2022 | — (Note: "Wildfire" did not enter on the Digital Chart but appeared at number 38 on the component Download Chart.) | — | Undisclosed | Shape of Love |
| "Saranghanda" (사랑한다) | 2022 | — (Note: "Saranghanda" (사랑한다) did not enter on the Digital Chart but appeared at number 39 on the component Download Chart.) | — | Undisclosed | Shape of Love |
| "And" | 2022 | — (Note: "And" did not enter on the Digital Chart but appeared at number 41 on the component Download Chart.) | — | Undisclosed | Shape of Love |
| "Daydream" | 2023 | 117 | — | Undisclosed | Reason |
| "Crescendo" (춤사위) | 2023 | 124 | — | Undisclosed | Reason |
| "Lone Ranger" | 2023 | 122 | — | Undisclosed | Reason |
| "Deny" | 2023 | 126 | — | Undisclosed | Reason |
| "It's Okay" (괜찮아) | 2023 | 131 | — | Undisclosed | Reason |
| "Savior" | 2025 | — (Note: "Savior" did not enter on the Digital Chart but appeared at number 53 on the component Download Chart.) | — | Undisclosed | The X |
| "Tuscan Leather" | 2025 | — (Note: "Tuscan Leather" did not enter on the Digital Chart but appeared at number 52 on the component Download Chart.) | — | Undisclosed | The X |
| "Catch Me Now" | 2025 | — (Note: "Catch Me Now" did not enter on the Digital Chart but appeared at number 55 on the component Download Chart.) | — | Undisclosed | The X |
| "Fire & Ice" | 2025 | — (Note: "Fire & Ice" did not enter on the Digital Chart but appeared at number 54 on the component Download Chart.) | — | Undisclosed | The X |
"—" denotes releases that did not chart or were not released in that region.

== Soundtrack appearances ==
List of soundtrack appearances, showing year released, album name, and name of artist(s)
| Title | Year | Album | Artist(s) | Notes | Ref. |
|---|---|---|---|---|---|
| "Honestly" | 2015 | High-End Crush OST | Monsta X | Television series | |
| "My Love" | 2016 | Good Evening, Teacher OST | Monsta X | Television series | |
| "The Tiger Moth" | 2016 | Shopaholic Louis OST | Monsta X | Television show | |
| "The Sun" | 2017 | Great Ocean OST | Monsta X, WJSN, and Kim Gun-mo | Mobile game | |
| "Breathe For You" | 2019 | Monsta X's Puppy Day OST | Monsta X | Web show | |
| "Here We Are" | 2020 | Monsta X's TWOTUCKBEBE Day OST | Monsta X | Web show | |
| "Reckless" (무모하고 대책없지만) | 2020 | Monsta X's Newtroland OST | Monsta X | Web show | |
| "How We Do" | 2020 | The SpongeBob Movie: Sponge on the Run | Monsta X and Snoop Dogg | Film | |
| "Beastmode" | 2025 | Exorcism Chronicles: The Beginning | Monsta X | Film | |

== Videography ==
=== Video albums ===
| Title | Album Details | Peak chart positions | | Sales |
| Title | Album Details | JPN | | Sales |
| Title | Album Details | DVD | BD | Sales |
Korean
| Monsta X 1st DVD - Montories | Released: May 17, 2017; Languages: Korean, English, Chinese, Japanese; Label: Starship Entertainment; Format: DVD | — | N/A | Undisclosed |
| 2018 Monsta X World Tour "The Connect" in Seoul | Released: January 22, 2019; Languages: Korean, English, Japanese; Label: Starship Entertainment; Format: DVD | — | N/A | KOR: 4,531 |
| 2019 Monsta X World Tour "We Are Here" in Seoul | Released: October 4, 2019; Languages: Korean, English, Japanese; Label: Starship Entertainment; Format: DVD | — | N/A | Undisclosed |
| Monsta X 2021 Fan-Concert "MX University" | Released: July 28, 2021; Languages: Korean, English, Japanese; Label: Starship Entertainment; Format: DVD | — | N/A | Undisclosed |
| Monsta X 2022 Fan-Concert "MX Agent" | Released: September 30, 2022; Languages: Korean, English, Japanese; Label: Starship Entertainment; Format: DVD, BD, KiT | — | — | Undisclosed |
Japanese
| Monsta X Japan First Live Tour 2018 "Piece" | Released: October 3, 2018; Language: Japanese; Label: Universal Music Japan; Formats: DVD, BD | 9 | 21 | JPN: 2,005 |
| Monsta X 2019 Japan Fan-Concert "Picnic" | Released: November 20, 2019; Language: Japanese; Label: Universal Music Japan; Formats: DVD, BD | 12 | 6 | Undisclosed |
"—" denotes releases that did not chart or were not released in that region.

=== Music videos ===
| Title | Year | Director | Other versions | Ref. |
Korean
| "Trespass" | 2015 | Joo Hee-sun (Iceland) | Rock ver. | |
| "Rush" | 2015 | Joo Hee-sun (Iceland) | N/A | |
| "Hero" | 2015 | Vishop (Vikings League) | Special Clip | |
| "All In" | 2016 | Dee Shin | N/A | |
| "Stuck" | 2016 | Vishop (Vikings League) | Special Clip | |
| "Do Better" | 2016 | Han Sa-min (Dextor Lab) | N/A | |
| "Fighter" | 2016 | Dee Shin | Part Switch ver. | |
| "Beautiful" | 2017 | Jo Beom-jin (VM Project Architecture) | Acoustic ver. | |
| "Shine Forever" | 2017 | Jo Beom-jin (VM Project Architecture) | N/A | |
| "Newton" | 2017 | Yoo Sung-kyun (Sunny Visual) | N/A | |
| "Dramarama" | 2017 | Vishop (Vikings League) | N/A | |
| "Jealousy" | 2018 | Han Sa-min (Dextor Lab) | N/A | |
| "Shoot Out" | 2018 | Vishop (Vikings League) | N/A | |
| "Alligator" | 2019 | Vishop (Vikings League) | N/A | |
| "Find You" | 2019 | Vishop (Vikings League) | N/A | |
| "Follow" | 2019 | Vishop (Vikings League) / Highqualityfish | N/A | |
| "Fantasia" | 2020 | Highqualityfish | N/A | |
| "Love Killa" | 2020 | Highqualityfish | N/A | |
| "Gambler" | 2021 | Highqualityfish | N/A | |
| "Kiss or Death" | 2021 | Highqualityfish | N/A | |
| "Rush Hour" | 2021 | Jo Beom-jin (VM Project Architecture) | N/A | |
| "Love" | 2022 | Seo Dong-hyeok (Flipevil) | N/A | |
| "If with U" | 2022 | Highqualityfish | N/A | |
| "Beautiful Liar" | 2023 | Highqualityfish | N/A | |
| "Do What I Want" | 2025 | Song Seo-yoon | N/A | |
| "N the Front" | 2025 | Lafic | N/A | |
| "Magic" | 2026 | Yuann | N/A | |
Japanese
| "Hero" | 2017 | Vishop (Vikings League) | N/A | |
| "Beautiful" | 2017 | Vishop (Vikings League) | N/A | |
| "Spotlight" | 2018 | Vishop (Vikings League) | N/A | |
| "Puzzle" | 2018 | Maxilla | N/A | |
| "Livin' It Up" | 2018 | Vishop (Vikings League) | N/A | |
| "Shoot Out" | 2019 | Vishop (Vikings League) | N/A | |
| "Alligator" | 2019 | Vishop (Vikings League) | N/A | |
| "X-Phenomenon" | 2019 | Vishop (Vikings League) | N/A | |
| "Wish on the Same Sky" | 2020 | Y Choi / Jimmy (VIA Production) | N/A | |
| "Love Killa" | 2020 | Highqualityfish | N/A | |
| "Wanted" | 2021 | Jimmy (VIA Production) | N/A | |
| "Flavors of Love" | 2021 | Jimmy (VIA Production) | N/A | |
| "Fantasia" | 2021 | Highqualityfish | N/A | |
English
| "Play It Cool" | 2019 | Highqualityfish | Remix ver. | |
| "Who Do U Love?" | 2019 | Vishop (Vikings League) | Remix ver. | |
| "Someone's Someone" | 2019 | Nicholas Lam (Hound Content) | N/A | |
| "Middle of the Night" | 2019 | Highqualityfish | N/A | |
| "You Can’t Hold My Heart" | 2020 | Romain Laurent (Little Minx) | Lyric Video | |
| "One Day" | 2021 | Kim Min-woo (Tankboyandidle) | Lyric Video | |
| "You Problem" | 2021 | Jimmy (VIA Production) | N/A | |
| "Late Night Feels" | 2022 | Ryan Turner | Remix ver. and Lyric Video | |
| "Baby Blue" | 2025 | Na Seung-kuen | N/A | |
| "Heal" | 2026 | Na Seung-kuen | N/A | |
