= List of awards and nominations received by Monsta X =

Monsta X awards and nominations
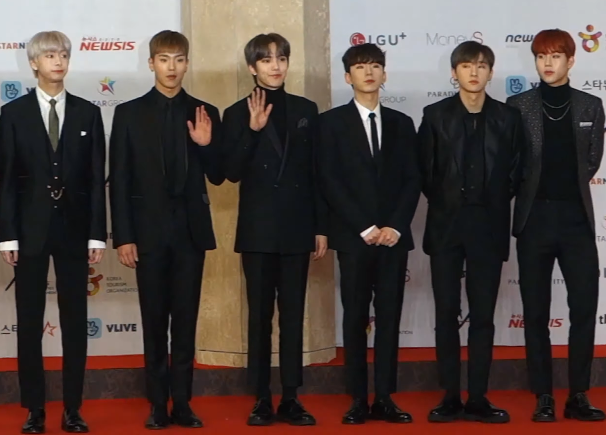
- Monsta X at 2018 Asia Artist Awards
Awards and nominations
Award	Wins	Nominations
APAN Music Awards	2	5
Asia Artist Awards	6	7
Asia Model Awards	1	1
Asia Star Entertainer Awards	1	1
Brand Customer Loyalty Award	0	1
Brand of the Year Awards	0	1
Bravo Otto	1	1
Breakout Awards	1	1
Dong-A.com's Pick	1	1
The Fact Music Awards	4	4
Gaon Chart Music Awards	1	4
Genie Music Awards	0	1
Golden Disc Awards	7	23
Hanteo Music Awards	1	1
iMBC Awards	2	2
KBS Entertainment Awards	1	1
Korea First Brand Awards	1	1
Korea Grand Music Awards	1	1
Korea Popular Music Awards	0	4
MAMA Awards	8	29
Melon Music Awards	3	6
Melon Plaque Award	1	1
MTV Europe Music Award	0	2
MTV MIAW Awards	0	2
MTV Video Music Awards	0	3
SEC Awards	0	2
Seoul Music Awards	5	31
Soompi Awards	2	2
Soribada Best K-Music Awards	5	10
Teen Choice Awards	0	1
Top Ten Awards	3	3
V Live Awards	4	7

Totals (Note: Certain award groups do not simply award one winner. They acknowledge several different recipients, have runners-up, and have third place. Since this is a specific recognition and is different from losing an award, runner-up mentions are considered wins in this award tally. For simplification and to avoid errors, each award in this list has been presumed to have had a prior nomination.)
- Wins: 63
- Nominations: 160

This is a list of awards and nominations received by Monsta X, a South Korean boy group formed through the reality survival program No.Mercy under Starship Entertainment on May 14, 2015.

== Awards and nominations ==
Name of the award ceremony, year presented, award category, recipient of the award and the result of the nomination
Award ceremony	Year	Category	Recipient	Result	Ref.
APAN Music Awards	2020	Represent Song of the Year	Monsta X	Won	
APAN Music Awards	2020	Top 10 (Bonsang)	Monsta X	Won	
APAN Music Awards	2020	Idol Champ Global Pick – Group	Monsta X	Nominated	
APAN Music Awards	2020	Best Performance	Monsta X	Nominated	
APAN Music Awards	2020	Best Music Video	Monsta X	Nominated	
Asia Artist Awards	2017	Best Entertainer Award – Music	Monsta X	Won	
Asia Artist Awards	2017	Popularity Award – Music	Monsta X	Longlisted	
Asia Artist Awards	2018	Artist of the Year – Music	Monsta X	Won	
Asia Artist Awards	2018	Best Icon Award – Music	Monsta X	Won	
Asia Artist Awards	2020	Stage of the Year (Daesang)	Monsta X	Won	
Asia Artist Awards	2025	Best Artist – Singer	Monsta X	Won	
Asia Artist Awards	2025	History of K-pop	Monsta X	Won	
Asia Model Awards (Note: Co-sponsored by the AMOF Organizing Committee, the Korea Model Association, and MK Sports, the Asia Model Awards is designed to award the best of Asia's celebrities.)	2020	Asia Star Award (Singer)	Monsta X	Won	
Asia Star Entertainer Awards	2026	Top Touring Artist	Monsta X	Won	
Brand Customer Loyalty Award (Note: Co-organized by the Korean Customers Council and Brand Keys, this event recognizes the most influential brands in society and culture, as determined through consumer research.)	2021	Male Idol	Monsta X	Nominated	
Brand of the Year Awards (Note: It is a large-scale brand award that selects and awards the best brands that shined in the year through direct consumer voting.)	2022	Male Idol of the Year	Monsta X	Nominated	
Bravo Otto	2019	Best K-pop	Monsta X	Bronze	
Breakout Awards (Note: Hosted by LiveOne and presented by Hyundai, this year's ceremony honors celebrities, musicians, and fanbases that used the internet to dominate the past year through content, engagement, and all-around meme-ability.)	2021	Supreme Stanbase	Monsta X	Won	
Dong-A.com's Pick	2018	Gold Award	Monsta X	Won	
The Fact Music Awards	2018	Artist of the Year	Monsta X	Won	
The Fact Music Awards	2018	Best Performer	Monsta X	Won	
The Fact Music Awards	2019	Year's Artist	Monsta X	Won	
The Fact Music Awards	2020	Year's Artist	Monsta X	Won	
Gaon Chart Music Awards	2016	New Artist of the Year	Monsta X	Nominated	
Gaon Chart Music Awards	2020	Album of the Year – 1st Quarter	Take.2 We Are Here	Nominated	
Gaon Chart Music Awards	2020	Album of the Year – 4th Quarter	Follow: Find You	Nominated	
Gaon Chart Music Awards	2020	World Hallyu Star	Monsta X	Won	
Genie Music Awards	2019	The Performing Artist – Male	Monsta X	Nominated	
Golden Disc Awards	2016	Disc Bonsang	Rush	Nominated	
Golden Disc Awards	2016	Best New Artist	Monsta X	Nominated	
Golden Disc Awards	2016	Next Generation Artist	Monsta X	Won	
Golden Disc Awards	2017	Disc Daesang	The Clan Pt. 1 Lost	Nominated	
Golden Disc Awards	2017	Disc Bonsang	The Clan Pt. 1 Lost	Won	
Golden Disc Awards	2017	Popularity Award	Monsta X	Nominated	
Golden Disc Awards	2018	Disc Daesang	The Code	Nominated	
Golden Disc Awards	2018	Disc Bonsang	The Code	Won	
Golden Disc Awards	2018	Global Popularity Award	Monsta X	Nominated	
Golden Disc Awards	2019	Disc Daesang	Take.1 Are You There?	Nominated	
Golden Disc Awards	2019	Disc Bonsang	Take.1 Are You There?	Won	
Golden Disc Awards	2019	Popularity Award	Monsta X	Nominated	
Golden Disc Awards	2019	NetEase Most Popular K-pop Star Award	Monsta X	Nominated	
Golden Disc Awards	2020	Disc Daesang	Take.2 We Are Here	Nominated	
Golden Disc Awards	2020	Disc Bonsang	Take.2 We Are Here	Won	
Golden Disc Awards	2020	NetEase Most Popular K-pop Star Award	Monsta X	Nominated	
Golden Disc Awards	2021	Disc Bonsang	Fatal Love	Nominated	
Golden Disc Awards	2021	Best Group	Monsta X	Won	
Golden Disc Awards	2021	Curaprox Most Popular Artist Award	Monsta X	Nominated	
Golden Disc Awards	2021	QQ Music Popularity Award	Monsta X	Nominated	
Golden Disc Awards	2022	Disc Bonsang	One of a Kind	Nominated	
Golden Disc Awards	2022	Seezn Most Popular Artist Award	Monsta X	Nominated	
Golden Disc Awards	2026	Best Group	Monsta X	Won	
Hanteo Music Awards	2023	Global Artist – Oceania	Monsta X	Won	
iMBC Awards	2026	Hot Star – First Half	Monsta X	Won	
iMBC Awards	2026	Best Male Singer	Monsta X	Won	
KBS Entertainment Awards	2025	Digital Content Award (Note: Shared with the whole cast.)	Idol 1N2D	Won	
Korea First Brand Awards (Note: Hosted by the Korea Consumer Brand Committee and the Korea Consumer Forum, the Korea First Brand Awards based its winners on a nationwide South Korean survey.)	2017	Male Idol	Monsta X	Won	
Korea Grand Music Awards	2026	Best Group	Monsta X	Won	
Korea Popular Music Awards (Note: The Korea Popular Music Awards was jointly established in 2018 by the Korea Singers Association, the Korea Entertainment Producer's Association, the Recording Industry Association of Korea, the Federation of Korean Music Performers, and the Korea Music Copyright Association.)	2018	Best Digital Song	"Jealousy"	Nominated	
Korea Popular Music Awards	2018	Best Group Dance Track	"Jealousy"	Nominated	
Korea Popular Music Awards	2018	Best Artist	Monsta X	Nominated	
Korea Popular Music Awards	2018	Popularity Award	Monsta X	Nominated	
MAMA Awards	2015	Next Generation Asian Artist	Monsta X	Won	
MAMA Awards	2015	Best New Male Artist	Monsta X	Nominated	
MAMA Awards	2015	Artist of the Year	Monsta X	Nominated	
MAMA Awards	2016	Best of Next Male Artist	Monsta X	Won	
MAMA Awards	2016	Best Dance Performance – Male Group	"All In"	Nominated	
MAMA Awards	2017	Best Dance Performance – Male Group	"Beautiful"	Nominated	
MAMA Awards	2017	Song of the Year	"Beautiful"	Nominated	
MAMA Awards	2017	Best Concert Performer	Monsta X	Won	
MAMA Awards	2017	Favorite K-pop Star	Monsta X	Nominated	
MAMA Awards	2018	Mwave Global Fans' Choice	"Dramarama"	Nominated	
MAMA Awards	2018	Song of the Year	"Shoot Out"	Nominated	
MAMA Awards	2018	Best Dance Performance – Male Group	"Shoot Out"	Nominated	
MAMA Awards	2018	Worldwide Icon of the Year	Monsta X	Nominated	
MAMA Awards	2018	Worldwide Fans' Choice Top 10	Monsta X	Won	
MAMA Awards	2018	Style in Music	Monsta X	Won	
MAMA Awards	2019	Artist of the Year	Monsta X	Nominated	
MAMA Awards	2019	Best Male Group	Monsta X	Nominated	
MAMA Awards	2019	Worldwide Icon of the Year	Monsta X	Nominated	
MAMA Awards	2019	Worldwide Fans' Choice Top 10	Monsta X	Won	
MAMA Awards	2019	World Performer	Monsta X	Won	
MAMA Awards	2019	Song of the Year	"Alligator"	Nominated	
MAMA Awards	2019	Best Dance Performance – Male Group	"Alligator"	Nominated	
MAMA Awards	2020	Artist of the Year	Monsta X	Nominated	
MAMA Awards	2020	Best Male Group	Monsta X	Nominated	
MAMA Awards	2020	Worldwide Fans' Choice Top 10	Monsta X	Nominated	
MAMA Awards	2020	Best Stage	Monsta X	Won	
MAMA Awards	2021	Worldwide Fans' Choice Top 10	Monsta X	Shortlisted	
MAMA Awards	2022	Worldwide Fans' Choice Top 10	Monsta X	Longlisted	
MAMA Awards	2023	Worldwide Fans' Choice Top 10	Monsta X	Longlisted	
Melon Music Awards	2015	Best New Male Artist	Monsta X	Nominated	
Melon Music Awards	2015	1theK Performance Award	Monsta X	Won	
Melon Music Awards	2020	Best Performance	Monsta X	Won	
Melon Music Awards	2022	Best Male Group	Monsta X	Nominated	
Melon Music Awards	2022	Global Artist	Monsta X	Won	
Melon Music Awards	2023	Millions Top 10 Album	Reason	Nominated	
Melon Plaque Award (Note: This event was held to discover hidden masterpieces that have not been noticed because of the title song through voting.)	2022	The Best Album Tracks – Top 10	"Stand Up"	Won	
MTV Europe Music Awards	2019	Best Group	Monsta X	Nominated	
MTV Europe Music Awards	2021	Best K-pop	Monsta X	Nominated	
MTV MIAW Awards	2022	K-pop Domination	Monsta X	Nominated	
MTV MIAW Awards	2023	K-pop Domination	Monsta X	Nominated	
MTV Video Music Awards	2019	Best K-Pop	"Who Do U Love?" feat. French Montana	Nominated	
MTV Video Music Awards	2020	Best K-Pop	"Someone's Someone"	Nominated	
MTV Video Music Awards	2021	Best K-Pop	"Gambler"	Nominated	
SEC Awards (Note: The SEC Awards, formerly known as the Séries em Cena Awards, is a Brazilian award show that honors achievements in music, film, television, and internet culture in Brazil and globally.)	2026	International Album/EP of the Year	Unfold	Pending	
SEC Awards	2026	International Group/Duo of the Year	Monsta X	Pending	
Seoul Music Awards	2016	New Artist Award	Monsta X	Nominated	
Seoul Music Awards	2016	Male Dance Performance Award	Monsta X	Won	
Seoul Music Awards	2018	Bonsang Award	Monsta X	Nominated	
Seoul Music Awards	2018	Popularity Award	Monsta X	Nominated	
Seoul Music Awards	2018	Hallyu Special Award	Monsta X	Nominated	
Seoul Music Awards	2018	Discovery of the Year Award	Monsta X	Won	
Seoul Music Awards	2019	Daesang Award	Monsta X	Nominated	
Seoul Music Awards	2019	Bonsang Award	Monsta X	Won	
Seoul Music Awards	2019	Popularity Award	Monsta X	Nominated	
Seoul Music Awards	2019	Hallyu Special Award	Monsta X	Nominated	
Seoul Music Awards	2020	Daesang Award	Monsta X	Nominated	
Seoul Music Awards	2020	Bonsang Award	Monsta X	Won	
Seoul Music Awards	2020	Popularity Award	Monsta X	Nominated	
Seoul Music Awards	2020	Hallyu Special Award	Monsta X	Nominated	
Seoul Music Awards	2020	QQ Music Most Popular K-pop Artist Award	Monsta X	Nominated	
Seoul Music Awards	2021	Daesang Award	Monsta X	Nominated	
Seoul Music Awards	2021	Bonsang Award	Monsta X	Won	
Seoul Music Awards	2021	Popularity Award	Monsta X	Nominated	
Seoul Music Awards	2021	K-Wave Popularity Award	Monsta X	Nominated	
Seoul Music Awards	2021	Fan PD Artist Award	Monsta X	Nominated	
Seoul Music Awards	2021	WhosFandom Award	Monsta X	Nominated	
Seoul Music Awards	2022	Bonsang Award	Monsta X	Nominated	
Seoul Music Awards	2022	Popularity Award	Monsta X	Nominated	
Seoul Music Awards	2022	K-Wave Popularity Award	Monsta X	Nominated	
Seoul Music Awards	2022	U+Idol Live Best Artist Award	Monsta X	Nominated	
Seoul Music Awards	2023	Bonsang Award	Monsta X	Nominated	
Seoul Music Awards	2023	Popularity Award	Monsta X	Nominated	
Seoul Music Awards	2023	Hallyu Special Award	Monsta X	Nominated	
Seoul Music Awards	2024	Bonsang Award	Monsta X	Nominated	
Seoul Music Awards	2024	Popularity Award	Monsta X	Nominated	
Seoul Music Awards	2024	Hallyu Special Award	Monsta X	Nominated	
Soompi Awards	2018	Breakout Artist	Monsta X	Won	
Soompi Awards	2018	Best MC	Monsta X	Won	
Soribada Best K-Music Awards	2017	Bonsang Award	Monsta X	Won	
Soribada Best K-Music Awards	2017	Popularity Award	Monsta X	Nominated	
Soribada Best K-Music Awards	2018	Bonsang Award	Monsta X	Won	
Soribada Best K-Music Awards	2018	New Hallyu Artist Award	Monsta X	Won	
Soribada Best K-Music Awards	2018	Hip Hop Artist Award	Monsta X	Nominated	
Soribada Best K-Music Awards	2018	Popularity Award (Male)	Monsta X	Nominated	
Soribada Best K-Music Awards	2018	Global Fandom Award	Monsta X	Nominated	
Soribada Best K-Music Awards	2019	Bonsang Award	Monsta X	Won	
Soribada Best K-Music Awards	2019	New Wave Award	Monsta X	Won	
Soribada Best K-Music Awards	2019	Popularity Award (Male)	Monsta X	Nominated	
Teen Choice Awards	2017	Choice International Artist	Monsta X	Nominated	
Top Ten Awards (Note: Hosted by Ten Asia since 2018, it is an award ceremony that recognizes the best global artists.)	2020	Best Artist – US	Monsta X	Won	
Top Ten Awards	2021	Best Artist – US	Monsta X	Won	
Top Ten Awards	2026	Best Male Idol Group	Monsta X	Won	
V Live Awards	2017	Global Artist Top 10	Monsta X	Won	
V Live Awards	2018	Global Artist Top 10	Monsta X	Won	
V Live Awards	2019	Artist Top 10	Monsta X	Nominated	
V Live Awards	2019	Best Channel – 1 million followers	Monsta X	Nominated	
V Live Awards	2019	Global Artist Top 12	Monsta X	Won	
V Live Awards	2019	The Most Loved Artist	Monsta X	Nominated	
V Live Awards	2019	Global Partnership Award	Monsta X	Won	

== Other accolades ==
=== State and cultural honors ===
Name of country or organization, year given and name of honor
Country or organization	Year	Honor	Ref.
South Korea (Note: Awarded at the Korean Popular Culture and Arts Awards, organized by the Korea Creative Content Agency and hosted by the South Korean Ministry of Culture, Sports and Tourism. Commendations are given to individuals or groups for their contribution to popular culture in South Korea and abroad.)	2019	Minister of Culture, Sports and Tourism Commendation	

=== Listicles ===
Name of publisher, year listed, name of listicle and placement
Publisher	Year	Listicle	Placement	Ref.
Billboard	2019	Social 50 of the 2010s	43rd	
The Chosun Ilbo	2020	Most Powerful People in the Music Industry – Top Boy Groups	4th	
Consequence	2021	10 K-pop Acts That Dominated 2021	Placed (Note: All the artists listed are either unranked or just alphabetically ranked.)	
Teen Vogue	2022	33 Best Boy Bands of All Time	Placed	

== See also ==
- List of awards and nominations received by Shownu
- List of awards and nominations received by Minhyuk
- List of awards and nominations received by Kihyun
- List of awards and nominations received by Hyungwon
- List of awards and nominations received by Joohoney
- List of awards and nominations received by I.M
- List of awards and nominations received by Shownu X Hyungwon
