= The Clan Pt. 2.5: The Final Chapter =

Studio album by Monsta X
- Released: March 21, 2017
- Recorded: 2016–2017
- Genres: K-pop; hip hop; trap; EDM; R&B
- Length: 33:10
- Language: Korean
- Labels: Starship; LOEN

Monsta X chronology
The Clan Pt. 2 Guilty (2016)	The Clan Pt. 2.5: The Final Chapter (2017)	The Code (2017)

Repackaged edition cover
- Shine Forever artwork

Singles from The Clan Pt. 2.5: The Final Chapter
- 1. "Beautiful (아름다워)" Released: March 21, 2017; 2. "Shine Forever" Released: June 19, 2017

The Clan Pt. 2.5: The Final Chapter is the debut studio album and the final part of The Clan series by the South Korean boy group Monsta X. It was released by Starship Entertainment and distributed by LOEN Entertainment on March 21, 2017. It also includes ten songs, with the title track "Beautiful". On the same year, the album was reissued as Shine Forever on June 19, with two additional tracks, including the title track of the same name.

== Background and release ==
On March 5, it was announced that the group will release their first studio album and the third part of The Clan series titled The Clan Pt. 2.5: The Final Chapter, after releasing the first two parts of The Clan series, with both extended plays; The Clan Pt. 1 Lost in May 2016 and The Clan Pt. 2 Guilty in October 2016.

On March 21, the title track "Beautiful" was released alongside the studio album. The music video was also released on Starship's and 1theK's official YouTube channels on the same day.

On June 5, Monsta X announced the reissuance of their first studio album through their official SNS. The image posted with the phrase "Repackage Coming Soon!" catches the eye with dreamy colors and sensual typography.

On June 19, the title track "Shine Forever" was released alongside the album of the same name. The music video was also released on Starship's and 1theK's official YouTube channels on the same day.

The studio album was released in three versions; Beautiful, Brilliant, and Beside, while the reissue was released in two versions; Shine Forever and Complete X-Clan.

== Composition ==
The album showed a strong step to protect the beauty of the found value, representing the souls that were hurt, and keeping the pure values, while bearing fruits of growth, while the repackage album is about searching for a ray of hope, like a traveler who finds his way by relying on the polar star shining alone in the dark night sky, and never gives up the hope of finding the light even if it gets lost, while having the desire for endless learning and growth.

"Beautiful" is a song in which the trap and dubstep sounds combine to create a popular melody line, expressing the love that one cannot have through a red rose and the heart for a love, that is difficult to deny. "Shine Forever" is a dance song that combines future bass and hip-hop elements, that expresses their strong and romantic love method, while having the growth to move toward the light, that begins with a tragic end and becomes more intense towards the end, burning the will to grow.

== Critical reception ==
"Beautiful" was described as advancing Monsta X's "signature sound of hip-hop mixed with EDM elements", with particular note of the "powerful rap" with "flawless vocals, especially lead vocalist Kihyun".

=== Listicles ===
Name of critic or publication, name of listicle, name of work and rank
Critic/Publication	List	Work	Rank	Ref.
Song
CelebMix	Top 10 K-pop Songs from 2017	"Beautiful"	8	

== Commercial performance ==
As of 2021, the album had sold over 150,000 units, while in 2022, the repackage album had sold over 80,000 units in South Korea.

"Beautiful" and "Shine Forever" debuted at numbers four, alongside "Gravity" at number seven on the Billboard World Digital Song Sales chart upon its release, while "Ready or Not" debuted at number nineteen in 2021.

== Track listing ==
The Clan Pt. 2.5: The Final Chapter track listing
No.	Title	Lyrics	Music	Arrangement	Length
1.	"Ready or Not"	Lish; Esbee; Stereo14; Jooheon; I.M	Lish; Esbee; Stereo14	Lish; Esbee; Stereo14	3:17
2.	"Beautiful" (아름다워)	Galactika (별들의전쟁); Jooheon; I.M	Galactika (별들의전쟁)	Galactika (별들의전쟁); Athena	3:24
3.	"Incomparable" (넘사벽)	XEPY; 5$; zomay; Lee Jiwon; Lee Kyungmin; Jooheon; I.M	XEPY; Vo3e; 1MAD; 5$; zomay	Vo3e	3:43
4.	"Need U" (니가 필요해)	Lish; Esbee; Megatone; Jooheon; I.M	Lish; Esbee; Megatone	Lish; Esbee; Megatone	3:18
5.	"Oi"	Wonho; Brother Su; Jooheon; I.M	Wonho; Brother Su; JJB; XEPY; Vo3e	Vo3e	3:11
6.	"Miss You"	Ye-Yo!; Jooheon; I.M	Ye-Yo!; Jooheon	Ye-Yo!; Jooheon	3:18
7.	"Calm Down"	Mafly; Keyfly; Jooheon; I.M	RE:ONE; Delly Boi; Davey Nate	RE:ONE; Delly Boi	3:07
8.	"All I Do" (너만 생각해)	Lish; ESBEE; 9999; Jooheon; I.M	Lish; ESBEE; 9999	Lish; ESBEE; 9999	3:38
9.	"5:14 (Last Page)"	Wonho; Jooheon; I.M	Hyuk Shin; MRey; Jayrah Gibson	Hyuk Shin; MRey	3:03
10.	"I'll Be There" (넌 어때)	Wonho; Jooheon; I.M	Wonho; JJB	Wonho; JJB	3:12
Total length:					33:10

Repackage edition
No.	Title	Lyrics	Music	Arrangement	Length
1.	"Ready or Not"	Lish; ESBEE; STEREO14; Jooheon; I.M	Lish; ESBEE; STEREO14	Lish; ESBEE; STEREO14	3:17
2.	"Beautiful" (아름다워)	Galactika (별들의전쟁); Jooheon; I.M	Galactika (별들의전쟁)	Galactika (별들의전쟁); Athena	3:24
3.	"Incomparable" (넘사벽)	XEPY; 5$; zomay; Lee Jiwon; Lee Kyungmin; Jooheon; I.M	XEPY; Vo3e; 1MAD; 5$; zomay	Vo3e	3:43
4.	"Need U" (니가 필요해)	Lish; ESBEE; Megatone; Jooheon; I.M	Lish; ESBEE; Megatone	Lish; ESBEE; Megatone	3:18
5.	"Oi"	Wonho; Brother Su; Jooheon; I.M	Wonho; Brother Su; JJB; XEPY; Vo3e	Vo3e	3:11
6.	"Miss You"	Ye-Yo!; Jooheon; I.M	Ye-Yo!; Jooheon	Ye-Yo!; Jooheon	3:18
7.	"Calm Down"	Mafly; Keyfly; Jooheon; I.M	RE:ONE; Delly Boi; Davey Nate	RE:ONE; Delly Boi	3:07
8.	"All I Do" (너만 생각해)	Lish; ESBEE; 9999; Jooheon; I.M	Lish; ESBEE; 9999	Lish; ESBEE; 9999	3:38
9.	"5:14 (Last Page)"	Wonho; Jooheon; I.M	Hyuk Shin; MRey; Jayrah Gibson	Hyuk Shin; MRey	3:03
10.	"I'll Be There" (넌 어때)	Wonho; Jooheon; I.M	Wonho; JJB	Wonho; JJB	3:12
11.	"Shine Forever"	Lish; Stereo14; BiNTAGE; Jooheon; I.M	Lish; Stereo14; BiNTAGE	Lish; Stereo14; BiNTAGE	3:28
12.	"Gravity"	Mafly; Jooheon; I.M	RE:ONE; Davey Nate	RE:ONE	3:31
Total length:					40:09

== Charts ==
=== Album ===
==== The Clan Pt. 2.5: The Final Chapter ====
===== Weekly charts =====
Chart performance for The Clan Pt. 2.5: The Final Chapter
Chart (2017)	Peak position
French Download Albums (SNEP)	113
Japan Hot Albums (Billboard Japan)	97
Japanese Albums (Oricon)	38
South Korean Albums (Gaon)	2
US Heatseekers Albums (Billboard)	10
US Independent Albums (Billboard)	31
US World Albums (Billboard)	1

===== Monthly chart =====
Chart performance for The Clan Pt. 2.5: The Final Chapter
Chart (2017)	Peak position
South Korean Albums (Gaon)	3

===== Year-end chart =====
Chart performance for The Clan Pt. 2.5: The Final Chapter
Chart (2017)	Position
South Korean Albums (Gaon)	25

==== Shine Forever ====
===== Weekly charts =====
Chart performance for Shine Forever
Chart (2017)	Peak position
South Korean Albums (Gaon)	1
US World Albums (Billboard)	10

===== Monthly chart =====
Chart performance for Shine Forever
Chart (2017)	Peak position
South Korean Albums (Gaon)	4

===== Year-end chart =====
Chart performance for Shine Forever
Chart (2017)	Position
South Korean Albums (Gaon)	53

=== Songs ===
==== Weekly chart ====
Chart performance for "Beautiful"
Chart (2017)	Peak position
US World Digital Song Sales (Billboard)	4

Chart performance for "Shine Forever"
Chart (2017)	Peak position
US World Digital Song Sales (Billboard)	4

Chart performance for "Gravity"
Chart (2017)	Peak position
US World Digital Song Sales (Billboard)	7

Chart performance for "Ready or Not"
Chart (2021)	Peak position
US World Digital Song Sales (Billboard)	19

== Sales ==
=== The Clan Pt. 2.5: The Final Chapter ===
Region	Sales
South Korea (Gaon)	157,309
Japan (Oricon)	10,272
United States (Nielsen)	1,000+

=== Shine Forever ===
Region	Sales
South Korea (Gaon)	84,563

== Awards and nominations ==
Name of the award ceremony, year presented, award category, nominated work and the result of the nomination
Award ceremony	Year	Category	Nominated work	Result	Ref.
Mnet Asian Music Awards	2017	Song of the Year	"Beautiful"	Nominated	
Mnet Asian Music Awards	2017	Best Dance Performance – Male Group	"Beautiful"	Nominated	

== Release history ==
Release history and formats for The Clan Pt. 2.5: The Final Chapter and Shine Forever
Album	Region	Date	Format	Label
The Clan Pt. 2.5: The Final Chapter	South Korea	March 21, 2017	CD; digital download; streaming	Starship Entertainment; LOEN Entertainment
The Clan Pt. 2.5: The Final Chapter	Various	March 21, 2017	Digital download; streaming	Starship Entertainment; LOEN Entertainment
Shine Forever	South Korea	June 19, 2017	CD; digital download; streaming	Starship Entertainment; LOEN Entertainment
Shine Forever	Various	June 19, 2017	Digital download; streaming	Starship Entertainment; LOEN Entertainment

== See also ==
- List of K-pop songs on the Billboard charts
- List of K-pop albums on the Billboard charts
- List of K-pop songs on the World Digital Song Sales chart
- List of Gaon Album Chart number ones of 2017
