= The Clan Pt. 2 Guilty =

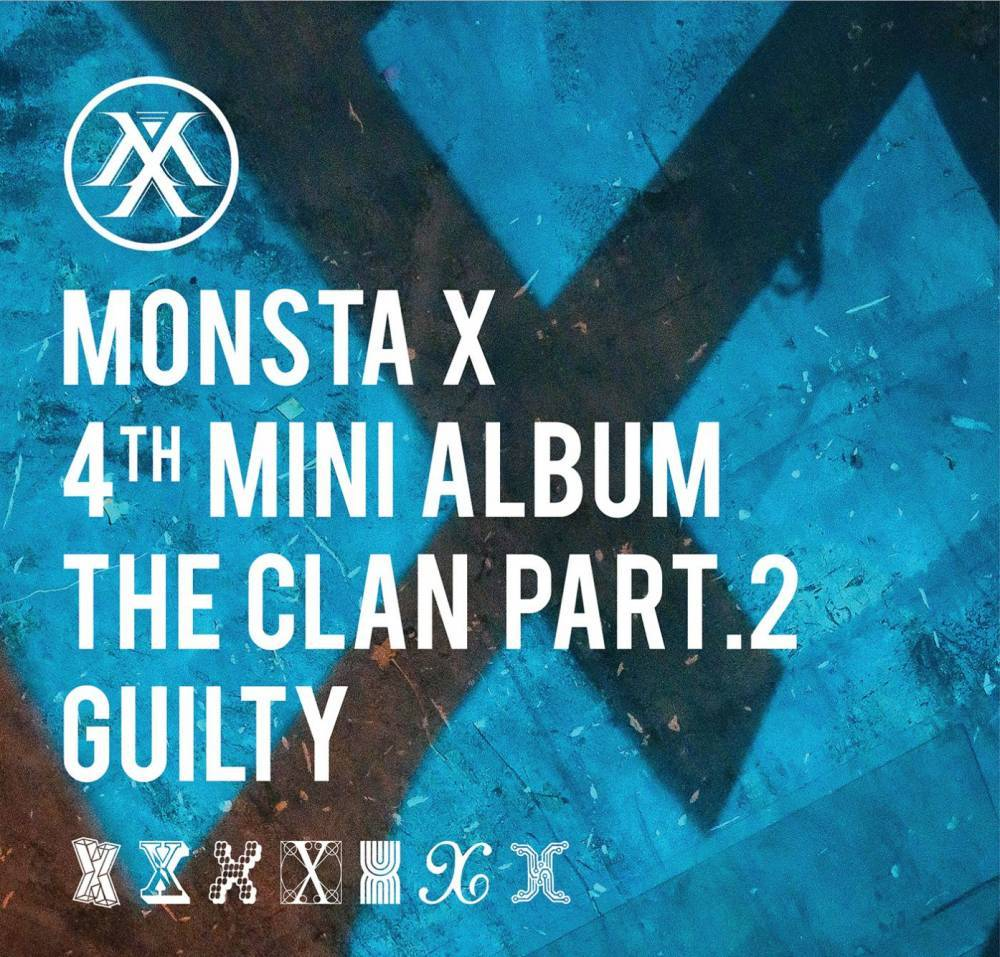

EP by Monsta X
- Released: October 4, 2016
- Recorded: 2016
- Genre: K-pop
- Length: 20:33
- Language: Korean
- Label: Starship; LOEN

Monsta X chronology
The Clan Pt. 1 Lost (2016)	The Clan Pt. 2 Guilty (2016)	The Clan Pt. 2.5: The Final Chapter (2017)

Singles from The Clan Pt. 2 'Guilty'
- 1. "Fighter" Released: October 4, 2016

The Clan Pt. 2 Guilty (also stylized as The Clan Pt. 2 'GUILTY') is the fourth extended play and the second part of The Clan series by the South Korean boy group Monsta X. It was released by Starship Entertainment and distributed by LOEN Entertainment on October 4, 2016. It also consists of six songs, including the title track "Fighter".

== Background and release ==
In September 2016, the group announced that they would release the second part of The Clan series, revealing the concept as Part 2: GUILTY.

The music video for the title track was released on Starship's and 1theK's official YouTube channels on the same day, directed by the award-winning film director Dee Shin.

The EP was released in two versions; Guilty and Innocent.

== Composition ==
The EP contains the story of protecting their innocence against the world that has caused them loss and pain.

"Fighter" is a song that captures the ears of listeners by expressing explosive youth, particularly, the overwhelming punchline, romantic melody, and direct lyrics intersect without rest, creating a dynamic feeling in the music and performance.

== Commercial performance ==
In 2016, the EP had sold over 100,000 units in South Korea. It also peaked at number two on the weekly Gaon Album Chart.

The title track "Fighter" debuted at number eight on the Billboard World Digital Song Sales chart upon its release and the song "Be Quiet" debuted at number fourteen in 2021.

== Track listing ==
The Clan Pt. 2 Guilty track listing
No.	Title	Lyrics	Music	Arrangement	Length
1.	"Fighter"	Seo Ji-eum; Jooheon; I.M	Park Geuntae; Choi Jinseok; Martin Hoberg Hedegaard	Park Geuntae; Choi Jinseok; Martin Hoberg Hedegaard	3:38
2.	"Be Quiet"	Mafly; Keyfly; Jooheon; I.M	Hyuk Shin; 999; Jayrah Gibson; Davey Nate	999	3:03
3.	"Blind"	Giriboy; Jooheon; I.M	Giriboy	Giriboy	3:33
4.	"Queen"	Mafly; Keyfly; Jooheon; I.M	Hyuk Shin; 999; Jayrah Gibson; Davey Nate	999	3:12
5.	"White Love" (하얀소녀)	Jooheon; I.M	Jooheon; Ye-Yo!	Ye-Yo!	3:50
6.	"Roller Coaster"	Trinity; Jooheon; I.M	1Take; Tak; Trinity	Tak	3:17
Total length:					20:33

== Charts ==
=== Album ===
==== Weekly charts ====
Chart performance for The Clan Pt. 2 Guilty
Chart (2016)	Peak position
Japan Hot Albums (Billboard Japan)	77
South Korean Albums (Gaon)	2
US Heatseekers Albums (Billboard)	16
US World Albums (Billboard)	3

==== Monthly chart ====
Chart performance for The Clan Pt. 2 Guilty
Chart (2016)	Peak position
South Korean Albums (Gaon)	6

==== Year-end chart ====
Chart performance for The Clan Pt. 2 Guilty
Chart (2016)	Position
South Korean Albums (Gaon)	23

=== Songs ===
==== Weekly charts ====
Chart performance for "Fighter"
Chart (2016)	Peak position
South Korea (Gaon)	217
US World Digital Song Sales (Billboard)	8

Chart performance for "Be Quiet"
Chart (2021)	Peak position
US World Digital Song Sales (Billboard)	14

== Sales ==
Region	Sales
South Korea (Gaon)	105,972

== Release history ==
Release history and formats for The Clan Pt. 2 Guilty
Region	Date	Format	Label
South Korea	October 4, 2016	CD; digital download; streaming	Starship Entertainment; LOEN Entertainment
Various	October 4, 2016	Digital download; streaming	Starship Entertainment; LOEN Entertainment

== See also ==
- List of K-pop songs on the Billboard charts
- List of K-pop albums on the Billboard charts
- List of K-pop songs on the World Digital Song Sales chart
