= Off the Beat =

- Digital cover

EP by I.M
- Released: April 3, 2024
- Genre: K-pop
- Length: 17:06
- Language: Korean; English
- Label: Sony Music Korea

I.M chronology
| Overdrive (2023) | Off the Beat (2024) |

Singles from Off the Beat
- 1. "Lure" Released: April 3, 2024

Off the Beat is the third extended play by the South Korean rapper I.M. It was released by Sony Music Korea on April 3, 2024. The EP contains six tracks, including the lead single "Lure".

== Background and release ==
On March 12, Sony Music Korea announced that I.M will make a comeback in April, three months since the release of his digital single "Slowly" featuring Heize. On March 13, it was revealed through the official SNS that he will release an extended play Off the Beat on April 3, ten months since the release of his second extended play Overdrive, with the lead single "Lure" revealed on March 18. On March 29, the album preview was released.

The physical EP was released in two standard versions; Off and Beat, with the addition of jewel case and Nemo versions.

== Composition ==
I.M made his name on all track credits, participating in the production of all songs.

Off the Beat expressed the "atypical" nature of being unconventional through music. It was sonically more upbeat than Overdrive, incorporating influences from hip hop, soul, R&B, and Latin music.

== Promotion ==
In April, Sony Music Korea collaborated with B.stage for the opening of "Imvitation - on the low" pop-up store, to commemorate the release of his album. It was also announced that he will have his first world tour Off the Beat, to be held in eighteen cities in ten countries.

== Commercial performance ==
I.M received his first Hanteo Chart Bronze Certification Plaque for achieving more than 100,000 copies in Initial Chodong sales in its first week of release in South Korea.

== Track listing ==
Off the Beat track listing
| No. | Title | Lyrics | Music | Arrangement | Length |
|---|---|---|---|---|---|
| 1. | "Lure" | I.M | I.M; Wooki | Wooki | 2:50 |
| 2. | "Bust It" | I.M | I.M; Long Drive; The Need | Long Drive; The Need | 2:52 |
| 3. | "XO" | I.M | I.M; Wooki | Wooki | 3:00 |
| 4. | "Skyline" | I.M | I.M; Long Drive; The Need | I.M; Long Drive; The Need | 2:55 |
| 5. | "MMI" | I.M | I.M; Wooki | Wooki | 2:51 |
| 6. | "nbdy" | I.M | I.M; Wooki | Wooki | 2:38 |
| Total length: | | | | | 17:06 |

== Charts ==
=== Weekly chart ===
Chart performance for Off the Beat
| Chart (2024) | Peak position |
|---|---|
| South Korean Albums (Circle) | 5 |

=== Monthly chart ===
Chart performance for Off the Beat
| Chart (2024) | Position |
|---|---|
| South Korean Albums (Circle) | 17 |

== Certification and sales ==
Certification and sales for Off the Beat
| Region | Certification | Certified units/sales |
|---|---|---|
| South Korea | — | 119,465 |

== Release history ==
Release history and formats for Off the Beat
| Region | Date | Format | Label |
|---|---|---|---|
| South Korea | April 3, 2024 | CD; digital download; streaming | Sony Music Korea |
| Various | April 3, 2024 | Digital download; streaming | Sony Music Korea |
