= Duality (EP) =

EP by I.M
- Released: February 19, 2021
- Genre: K-pop; hip-hop; trap; R&B
- Length: 14:27
- Language: Korean; English
- Label: Starship

I.M chronology
Duality (2021)	Overdrive (2023)

Singles from Duality
- 1. "God Damn" Released: February 19, 2021

Duality is the debut extended play by the South Korean rapper I.M. It was released by Starship Entertainment on February 19, 2021. The digital EP contains five tracks including the lead single "God Damn".

== Background and release ==
In January 2021, I.M announced that the solo work he had been preparing in 2020 will be released as his first solo album, rather than a mixtape release, and an intended release later in 2021. The EP was released digitally, rather than as a physical album, to avoid restrictions on its sales by an explicit rating.

Its physical was released in LP version on April 20, 2023.

== Critical reception ==
Professional ratings
Review scores
Source	Rating
NME	3/5 stars

The tracks on the album were noted for all being themed around "duality" (二重性). I.M was noted for "showing versatility as an artist" and "expanding his musical style when compared to his work in Monsta X". That the difference of his musical style in Monsta X to his solo work, as noted by Ruby C for NME, it was "part of showing the theme of the album" along with the "emotion and delivery of the tracks".

== Track listing ==
Duality track listing
No.	Title	Lyrics	Music	Arrangement	Length
1.	"God Damn"	I.M	I.M; Wooki	I.M; Wooki	3:27
2.	"Howlin'"	I.M	I.M; Long Drive; The Need	I.M; Long Drive; The Need	2:45
3.	"Burn"	I.M	I.M; Long Drive	I.M; Long Drive	2:46
4.	"Happy to Die"	I.M	I.M; Wooki	I.M; Wooki	2:58
5.	"시든 꽃" (Flower-ed)	I.M	I.M; Long Drive	I.M; Long Drive	2:29
Total length:					14:27

== Charts ==
=== Album ===
==== Weekly chart ====
Chart performance for Duality
Chart (2023)	Peak position
South Korean Albums (Circle)	44

=== Songs ===
==== Weekly charts ====
Chart performance for "God Damn"
Chart (2021)	Peak position
South Korea (Gaon) (Note: "God Damn" did not enter on the Digital Chart but appeared on the component Download Chart.)	72
US World Digital Songs (Billboard)	9

Chart performance for "Howlin'"
Chart (2021)	Peak position
US World Digital Songs (Billboard)	17

Chart performance for "Burn"
Chart (2021)	Peak position
US World Digital Songs (Billboard)	21

Chart performance for "Happy to Die"
Chart (2021)	Peak position
US World Digital Songs (Billboard)	19

Chart performance for "시든 꽃" (Flower-ed)
Chart (2021)	Peak position
US World Digital Songs (Billboard)	20

== Certification and sales ==
Certification and sales for Duality
Region	Certification	Certified units/Sales
South Korea	—	4,895

== Release history ==
Release history and formats for Duality
Region	Date	Format	Label
Various	February 19, 2021	Digital download; streaming	Starship Entertainment
South Korea	April 20, 2023	LP	Starship Entertainment

== See also ==
- List of K-pop songs on the Billboard charts
