= Overdrive (EP) =

- Digital cover

EP by I.M
- Released: June 23, 2023
- Genre: K-pop
- Length: 16:22
- Language: Korean
- Label: Sony Music Korea

I.M chronology
Duality (2021)	Overdrive (2023)	Off the Beat (2024)

Singles from Overdrive
- 1. "Overdrive" Released: June 23, 2023

Overdrive (also stylized in all caps) is the second extended play by the South Korean rapper I.M. It was released by Sony Music Korea on June 23, 2023. The EP contains six tracks, including the lead single of the same name.

== Background and release ==
On May 17, Sony Music Korea unveiled I.M's new album Overdrive and opened official channels exclusively for I.M. It will be his first album release after transferring to the new label. On May 19, it was announced that Overdrive will be released on June 23, making it both a domestic and a worldwide simultaneous release. On June 12, Sony Music Korea announced that there will be countdown live and special meeting time with global fans, to commemorate the release of Overdrive through I.M's YouTube channel, on the day of the release, as well as the released of the behind-the-scenes of the album's preparation process. On June 30, I.M released a live film of the track "Habit". On August 5 and 6, I.M held the Overdrive Showcase Tour in Seoul at Yes24 Live Hall.

The physical EP was released in two standard versions; Metal and Blue, with the addition of jewel case version and POCA versions.

== Imagery ==
The cover image embodies the "trajectory of a car speeding through the middle of the night", along with the logo of Overdrive, while the intense color graphics caught the eye, which symbolizes the message of "to run without hesitation for the goal set by oneself at the highest speed". It is also correlated with I.M's original musical identity, which was completely melted with the will to run "speed up".

== Composition ==
I.M took charge of writing the lyrics, composing, and producing all the songs, while incorporating various genres such as trap, deep soul, R&B, and jazz.

Overdrive expressed the will to run without hesitation for the goal set by oneself in any situation with a new emergency. If Duality captures the inner story, Overdrive gives the kind of impression that these emotions erupt outward. It presented the journey of a relationship that blazes and heads towards a rather ruinous end but leaves behind a trail of burning embers.

For the tracks, "Overdrive" is a track that fused the elements of hip hop and R&B which radiated an extremely cool vibe, complemented by the inclusion of sleek perspective play, "Blame" is a track that makes a smooth progression from R&B to trap genre which belts out the pain for not being able to forget a love and trying to have that someone get over this guilt, "Dumb" is a track slew of R&B beats which reveals that love makes one act like a fool sometimes and makes one want to do everything possible for that someone, "Habit" is a R&B genre track which is associated with having that attachment with someone and how difficult it is to get out of it, "More" is a sultry track which conveys a sense of understanding and sheer demand of fulfillment of desire, and "Not Sorry" is a track that incorporates retro-jazz music which explains that one does not need to make an apology when follow one's heart and desire.

== Commercial performance ==
Overdrive placed at numbers six and nine on the Circle Album Chart, for the week of June 18 to 24, with 88,423 copies sold, while number eight on the Circle Retail Album Chart, with 13,038 copies sold.

It entered the Melon's "Hall of Fame", which displays honorable records of domestic and foreign artists, with their domestically released albums, joining its "Million Album", an album category which celebrates albums that have achieved one million streams or more within 24 hours of its release, with a record of 1,067,300 total streams, had been commemorated in the "Million Album of All Time".

== Track listing ==
Overdrive track listing
No.	Title	Lyrics	Music	Arrangement	Length
1.	"Overdrive"	I.M	I.M; Wooki	Wooki	2:55
2.	"Blame"	I.M	I.M; Long Drive; The Need	Long Drive; The Need	2:41
3.	"Dumb"	I.M	I.M; Wooki	Wooki	2:54
4.	"Habit" (Saxophone by Kim Soo-hwan)	I.M	I.M; Wooki; Yoonseok	Wooki	3:04
5.	"More"	I.M	I.M; Long Drive	Long Drive; Devine Channel	2:27
6.	"Not Sorry"	I.M	I.M; Wooki	Wooki	2:21
Total length:					16:22

== Charts ==
=== Weekly chart ===
Chart performance for Overdrive
Chart (2023)	Peak position
Japanese Hot Albums (Billboard Japan)	36
South Korean Albums (Circle)	6

=== Monthly chart ===
Chart performance for Overdrive
Chart (2023)	Peak position
South Korean Albums (Circle)	27

== Certification and sales ==
Certification and sales for Overdrive
Region	Certification	Certified units/sales
South Korea	—	129,863

== Release history ==
Release history and formats for Overdrive
Region	Date	Format	Label
South Korea	June 23, 2023	CD; digital download; streaming	Sony Music Korea
Various	June 23, 2023	Digital download; streaming	Sony Music Korea
