= Rush (EP) =

EP by Monsta X
- Released: September 7, 2015
- Genre: K-pop; Hip hop; EDM; R&B
- Length: 23:00
- Language: Korean
- Label: Starship; LOEN

Monsta X chronology
Trespass (2015)	Rush (2015)	The Clan Pt. 1 Lost (2016)

Singles from Rush
- 1. "Rush" Released: September 7, 2015; 2. "Hero" Released: October 1, 2015

Rush is the second extended play by the South Korean boy group Monsta X. It was released by Starship Entertainment and distributed by LOEN Entertainment on September 7, 2015. It also consists of six tracks, including the title track of the same name and "Hero".

== Background and release ==
The album pictorial was worked with Jay Ahn, producer of Zenith Division, a content company of KCM Agency. He is in charge of music videos and photos of world-class pop stars such as Feast Movement, Chris Brown, and Omarion and is currently popular as the hottest creative director in the United States.

The group held a media and fan showcase at the Ilchi Art Hall in Cheongdam-dong, Seoul on September 7.

The physical EP was released in two versions; Official and Secret, with different packaging and later digitally repackaged, along with its broadcast version of "Hero" as the title track.

== Composition ==
The EP highlights the characteristics of black music, such as trap, pop rap, and contemporary R&B, while emphasizing the members' capabilities and teamwork, and containing some of its dynamic arrangement and musical wit.

"Rush" is a hip-hop track armed with the members' masculinity and wit, a bold yet ambitious theme for a woman, along with sharp flow, aggressive, and neatly refined harmony which stands out. "Hero" is a song that has a unique brass sound and sub-bass progress, that are well harmonized to lead the groove, while the dramatic and majestic song development has been doubled, and it is preparing to establish itself as another signature track of Monsta X through sensual and sophisticated sound making.

== Commercial performance ==
As of 2020, the EP had sold a total of 78,744 copies, per the Gaon Music Chart in South Korea.

"Rush" debuted and peaked at number 139 on the weekly Gaon Digital Chart, as well as entering at number 15 on the weekly Billboard World Digital Song Sales chart in 2021.

== Track listing ==
Rush track listing
No.	Title	Lyrics	Music	Arrangements	Length
1.	"Rush" (신속히)	Giriboy; Jooheon; I.M	Giriboy	Giriboy	3:43
2.	"Hero"	Punch Sound; Rhymer; Jooheon; I.M	Punch Sound	Punch Sound	3:52
3.	"Perfect Girl"	Esbee; Lissie; 9999; Jooheon; I.M	Esbee; Lissie; 9999	Esbee; Lissie; 9999	3:40
4.	"Amen"	Crybaby; Take'M	Rescue The Beat	Crybaby	3:57
5.	"Gone Bad" (삐뚤어질래)	Mad Clown; Taewan; Jooheon	Ye-Yo!; Taewan; Jooheon	Ye-Yo!	3:42
6.	"Broken Heart"	Rescue The Beat; Kim Seung-joon; Jooheon; I.M	Rescue The Beat; Kim Seung-joon	Kim Seung-joon; Go A-ra	3:47
Total length:					23:00

== Charts ==
=== Album ===
==== Weekly chart ====
Chart performance for Rush
Chart (2015)	Peak position
South Korean Albums (Gaon)	3

==== Monthly chart ====
Chart performance for Rush
Chart (2015)	Peak position
South Korean Albums (Gaon)	6

==== Year-end chart ====
Chart performance for Rush
Chart (2015)	Position
South Korean Albums (Gaon)	46

=== Songs ===
==== Weekly charts ====
Chart performance for "Rush"
Chart (2015 & 2021)	Peak position
South Korea (Gaon)	139
US World Digital Song Sales (Billboard)	15

Chart performance for "Hero"
Chart (2015)	Peak position
South Korea (Gaon)	250
US World Digital Song Sales (Billboard)	12

== Sales ==
Region	Sales
South Korea (Gaon)	78,744

== Awards and nominations ==
Name of the award ceremony, year presented, award category, nominated work and the result of the nomination
Award ceremony	Year	Category	Nominated work	Result	Ref.
Golden Disc Awards	2016	Disc Bonsang	Rush	Nominated	

== Release history ==
Release history and formats for Rush
Region	Date	Format	Label
South Korea	September 7, 2015	CD; digital download; streaming	Starship Entertainment; LOEN Entertainment
Various	September 7, 2015	Digital download; streaming	Starship Entertainment; LOEN Entertainment

== See also ==
- List of K-pop songs on the Billboard charts
- List of K-pop songs on the World Digital Song Sales chart
