= Trespass (EP) =

EP by Monsta X
- Released: May 14, 2015
- Genre: K-pop
- Length: 25:00
- Language: Korean
- Label: Starship; LOEN

Monsta X chronology
Trespass (2015)	Rush (2015)

Singles from Trespass
- 1. "Trespass" Released: May 14, 2015

Trespass is the debut and the first extended play by the South Korean boy group Monsta X. It was released by Starship Entertainment and distributed by LOEN Entertainment on May 14, 2015. It has seven tracks, including the title track of the same name.

== Background and release ==
Trespass is Monsta X's debut release. The EP includes the pre-debut release "Interstellar" by members Hyungwon, Jooheon, and I.M, that was originally released as part of the Mnet's survival reality show No.Mercy.

The group held a showcase at the Lotte Card Art Center in Hapjeong-dong, Mapo-gu, Seoul on May 13.

The music video for the title track was released on 1theK's official YouTube channel on the same day as the EP and was directed by the South Korean music video director and CEO of Iceland Joo Hee-sun.

== Composition ==
The debut EP contains seven tracks, with the theme of the challenging lifestyles of the seven members and the strength of absorbing the colors of the producers, while projecting the confidence of Monsta X everywhere.

"Trespass" is a hip-hop track that combines raw sound and intense performance. It also means that the members are young and trying to break into new things, while representing each member's individuality.

== Commercial performance ==
As of 2020, the debut EP had already accumulated a total of 41,593 copies sold on the Gaon Music Chart in South Korea.

"Trespass" debuted and peaked at number 148 on the weekly Gaon Digital Chart, as well as number 14 on the weekly Billboard World Digital Song Sales chart.

== Track listing ==
Trespass track listing
No.	Title	Lyrics	Music	Arrangement	Length
1.	"Trespass" (무단침입)	Mad Clown; Kim Yi-na	Lissie; Assbrass; Lee Ji-hoon	Lissie; Assbrass	3:25
2.	"No Exit" (출구는 없어)	Rhymer; Jooheon; I.M; Kihyun	Lissie; Rhymer; Jooheon; Kihyun	Lissie	3:28
3.	"One Love"	Jooheon; Nago; I.M	Lee Ji-hoon; Jooheon; Nago		3:14
4.	"Honestly" (솔직히 말할까)	Crybaby; Louie	Crybaby		3:53
5.	"Steal Your Heart" (훔쳐)	Rhymer; Wonho; Jooheon; I.M	9999, Esbee, Assbrass	Assbrass	3:47
6.	"Blue Moon"	Jooheon; I.M	Jooheon; Nago	Nago	3:11
7.	"Interstellar" (인터스텔라)	Jooheon; I.M; Yella Diamond	Yella Diamond	Yella Diamond	3:47
Total length:					25:00

== Charts ==
=== Album ===
==== Weekly chart ====
Chart performance for Trespass
Chart (2015)	Peak position
South Korean Albums (Gaon)	5

==== Monthly chart ====
Chart performance for Trespass
Chart (2015)	Peak position
South Korean Albums (Gaon)	10

==== Year-end chart ====
Chart performance for Trespass
Chart (2015)	Position
South Korean Albums (Gaon)	63

=== Songs ===
==== Weekly charts ====
Chart performance for "Trespass"
Chart (2015)	Peak position
South Korea (Gaon)	148
US World Digital Song Sales (Billboard)	14

== Sales ==
Region	Sales
South Korea (Gaon)	41,593

== Release history ==
Release history and formats for Trespass
Region	Date	Format	Label
South Korea	May 14, 2015	CD; digital download; streaming	Starship Entertainment; LOEN Entertainment
Various	May 14, 2015	Digital download; streaming	Starship Entertainment; LOEN Entertainment

== See also ==
- List of K-pop songs on the Billboard charts
- List of K-pop songs on the World Digital Song Sales chart
