= One of a Kind (Monsta X EP) =

EP by Monsta X
- Released: June 1, 2021
- Genre: K-pop; hip hop; EDM; R&B
- Length: 23:55
- Language: Korean
- Label: Starship; Kakao

Monsta X chronology
Flavors of Love (2021)	One of a Kind (2021)	No Limit (2021)

Singles from One of a Kind
- 1. "Gambler" Released: June 1, 2021

One of a Kind is the ninth extended play by the South Korean boy group Monsta X. It was released by Starship Entertainment and distributed by Kakao Entertainment on June 1, 2021.

== Background and release ==
The extended play was announced in May 2021. On May 3, Starship Entertainment announced that Shownu would not be promoting with the group for the comeback due to health issues.

The lead single "Gambler" was written in part by members Joohoney and I.M, and was the first lead single for the group produced by Joohoney. Additionally, Hyungwon wrote the fan dedicated song "Bebe" and wrote and produced for the song "Secrets", and I.M wrote and produced for the song "Rotate".

== Critical reception ==
Professional ratings
Review scores
Source	Rating
NME	4/5 stars

Ruby C, writing for NME, describes "Gambler" as a departure "from the group's usual (and predictable) title-as-a-repetitive-hook formula to create an alluring and unadulteratedly fun song". For the track "Secrets", she also wrote that, "it could have fit right in with [All About Luv's] pop sensibilities, sax outro, and mildly suggestive lyrics".

=== Listicles ===
Name of critic or publication, name of listicle, name of work and rank
Critic/Publication	List	Work	Rank	Ref.
Song
Dazed	The Best K-pop Tracks of 2021	"Gambler"	7	
Paper	The 40 Best K-pop Songs of 2021	"Gambler"	13	

== Commercial performance ==
The EP peaked at number three on the weekly Gaon Album Chart and sold more than 300,000 copies in its first month of release in South Korea.

All the songs from the EP charted on the weekly Billboard World Digital Song Sales chart, occupying more than twenty-five percent of the entire World Songs chart.

== Track listing ==
One of a Kind track listing
No.	Title	Lyrics	Music	Arrangement	Length
1.	"Gambler"	Joohoney; Ye-Yo!; I.M; Laser; Hwang Yu-bin; Jooyoung	Joohoney; Ye-Yo!; Laser; Jooyoung	Joohoney; Ye-Yo!	3:33
2.	"Heaven"	Joohoney; Ye-Yo!; Laser; I.M	Joohoney; Ye-Yo!; Laser	Joohoney; Ye-Yo!	3:03
3.	"Addicted"	153/Joombas; San; Joohoney; I.M	San; Zenur; Fascinador; PRNCE; Kevin Leinster Jr.; Shaquille Rayes; Alawn	Zenur; PRNCE; Fascinador	3:06
4.	"Secrets"	Hyungwon; Jantine Annika Heij; Joohoney; I.M; Justin Oh	Hyungwon; Justin Oh; Jantine Annika Heij	Hyungwon; Justin Oh; Jantine Annika Heij	3:21
5.	"Bebe"	Hyungwon	Snny	Snny	3:45
6.	"Rotate"	I.M; Yoonseok; Wooki; Joohoney	I.M; Yoonseok; Wooki	I.M; Yoonseok; Wooki	3:23
7.	"Livin' It Up" (Korean version)	Enzo; Mun Sal-li; Joohoney; I.M	Albin Nordqvist; Tommy Clint	Albin Nordqvist	3:44
Total length:					23:55

== Charts ==
=== Album ===
==== Weekly charts ====
Chart performance for One of a Kind
Chart (2021)	Peak position
Japan Hot Albums (Billboard Japan)	79
Japanese Albums (Oricon)	10
Polish Albums (ZPAV)	29
South Korean Albums (Gaon)	3

==== Monthly chart ====
Chart performance for One of a Kind
Chart (2021)	Peak position
South Korean Albums (Gaon)	5

==== Year-end chart ====
Chart performance for One of a Kind
Chart (2021)	Position
South Korean Albums (Gaon)	40

=== Songs ===
==== Weekly charts ====
Chart performance for "Gambler"
Chart (2021)	Peak position
South Korea (Gaon)	118
US World Digital Song Sales (Billboard)	5

Chart performance for "Addicted"
Chart (2021)	Peak position
US World Digital Song Sales (Billboard)	11

Chart performance for "Secrets"
Chart (2021)	Peak position
US World Digital Song Sales (Billboard)	12

Chart performance for "Rotate"
Chart (2021)	Peak position
US World Digital Song Sales (Billboard)	13

Chart performance for "Livin' It Up" (Korean version)
Chart (2021)	Peak position
US World Digital Song Sales (Billboard)	14

Chart performance for "Heaven"
Chart (2021)	Peak position
US World Digital Song Sales (Billboard)	15

Chart performance for "Bebe"
Chart (2021)	Peak position
US World Digital Song Sales (Billboard)	16

== Certification and sales ==
Certification and sales for One of a Kind
Region	Certification	Certified units/Sales
South Korea (KMCA)	Platinum	380,702
Japan	—	4,641

== Awards and nominations ==
Name of the award ceremony, year presented, award category, nominated work and the result of the nomination
Award ceremony	Year	Category	Nominated work	Result	Ref.
Golden Disc Awards	2022	Disc Bonsang	One of a Kind	Nominated	
MTV Video Music Awards	2021	Best K-pop	"Gambler"	Nominated	

== Release history ==
Release history and formats for One of a Kind
Region	Date	Format	Label
South Korea	June 1, 2021	CD; digital download; streaming	Starship Entertainment; Kakao Entertainment
Various	June 1, 2021	Digital download; streaming	Starship Entertainment; Kakao Entertainment

== See also ==
- List of certified albums in South Korea
- List of K-pop songs on the Billboard charts
- List of K-pop songs on the World Digital Song Sales chart
