= The Clan Pt. 1 Lost =

EP by Monsta X
- Released: May 18, 2016
- Recorded: 2016
- Genre: K-pop
- Length: 19:54
- Language: Korean
- Label: Starship; LOEN

Monsta X chronology
Rush (2015)	The Clan Pt. 1 Lost (2016)	The Clan Pt. 2 Guilty (2016)

Singles from The Clan Pt. 1 'Lost'
- 1. "Ex Girl" Released: May 9, 2016; 2. "All In" Released: May 18, 2016; 3. "Stuck" Released: August 7, 2016

The Clan Pt. 1 Lost (also stylized as The Clan Pt. 1 'LOST') is the third extended play and the first part of The Clan series by the South Korean boy group Monsta X. It was released by Starship Entertainment and distributed by LOEN Entertainment on May 18, 2016. It consists of six tracks, including the singles "Ex Girl", "All In", and "Stuck".

== Background and release ==
In April 2016, the group announced that they would release The Clan series, revealing the first concept as Part 1: LOST. On May 9, the track "Ex Girl" featuring Mamamoo's Wheein was pre-released. On May 18, the title track "All In" was released, along with the EP.

The group held their comeback showcase on May 18 at Yes24 Live Hall in Seoul and was streamed live on Naver's V App.

The music video for the title track was released on the Starship's and 1theK's official YouTube channels on the same day, directed by the award-winning film director Dee Shin.

The EP was released in two versions; Found and Lost.

== Composition ==
The EP depicts the loss and pain of youth, containing young people who live with pain in their hearts and having tragic ending through loss.

The track "Ex Girl" is a mellow pop R&B track, describing a man's regret about the one who got away. The title track "All In" is a hip hop track that highlights the group's signature powerful sound and move; it also features a thumping beat and furious raps.

== Critical reception ==
Writing for Dazed, Taylor Glasby described the music video for "All In" as ambitious and provocative, "but the video almost backseats the song to a soundtrack", which Glasby also describes as "far better than the MV gives it the chance to be, particularly the crooning chorus".

=== Listicles ===
Name of critic or publication, name of listicle, name of work and rank
Critic/Publication	List	Work	Rank	Ref.
Song
Dazed	The 20 Best K-pop Tracks of the Year	"All In"	11	

== Commercial performance ==
As of 2022, the EP had sold over 100,000 units in South Korea. It also peaked at number three on the weekly Gaon Album Chart.

"Ex Girl" and "All In" debuted at numbers 118 and 159 on the weekly Gaon Digital Chart, respectively, while "All In" and "Stuck" debuted at numbers 6 and 11 on the weekly Billboard World Digital Song Sales chart, respectively.

== Track listing ==
The Clan Pt. 1 Lost track listing
No.	Title	Lyrics	Music	Arrangement	Length
1.	"Ex Girl" (feat. Wheein of Mamamoo)	ESBEE; Jooheon; I.M	Lish; ESBEE	Lish; ESBEE	3:23
2.	"All In" (걸어)	ESBEE; Stereo 14; Lish; Mad Clown; Jooheon; I.M	Lish; Stereo 14; ESBEE; Brother Su	Lish; Stereo 14; ESBEE	3:10
3.	"Stuck" (네게만 집착해)	Punch Sound; Seo Ji-eum; Jooheon; I.M	Punch Sound	Punch Sound	3:45
4.	"Sweetheart" (백설탕)	Jooheon; I.M; Jeongmin	Jooheon; I.M; Jeongmin	Jeongmin	3:15
5.	"Unfair Love" (반칙이야)	Kiggen; Stereo 14; Lish; Seo Ji-eum; Jooheon; I.M	Stereo 14; Lish; Kiggen	Stereo 14; Lish; Kiggen	3:18
6.	"Because of U"	Rescue the Beat; Jooheon; I.M	Rescue the Beat	Rescue the Beat	3:03
Total length:					19:54

== Charts ==
=== Album ===
==== Weekly charts ====
Chart performance for The Clan Pt. 1 Lost
Chart (2016)	Peak position
Japanese Albums (Oricon)	37
South Korean Albums (Gaon)	3
US World Albums (Billboard)	5

==== Monthly chart ====
Chart performance for The Clan Pt. 1 Lost
Chart (2016)	Peak position
South Korean Albums (Gaon)	6

==== Year-end chart ====
Chart performance for The Clan Pt. 1 Lost
Chart (2016)	Position
South Korean Albums (Gaon)	29

=== Songs ===
==== Weekly charts ====
Chart performance for "Ex Girl"
Chart (2016)	Peak position
South Korea (Gaon)	118

Chart performance for "All In"
Chart (2016)	Peak position
South Korea (Gaon)	159
US World Digital Song Sales (Billboard)	6

Chart performance for "Stuck"
Chart (2016)	Peak position
US World Digital Song Sales (Billboard)	11

== Sales ==
Region	Sales
South Korea (Gaon)	106,805

== Awards and nominations ==
Name of the award ceremony, year presented, award category, nominated work and the result of the nomination
Award ceremony	Year	Category	Nominated work	Result	Ref.
Golden Disc Awards	2017	Disc Daesang	The Clan Pt. 1 Lost	Nominated	
Golden Disc Awards	2017	Disc Bonsang	The Clan Pt. 1 Lost	Won	
Mnet Asian Music Awards	2016	Best Dance Performance – Male Group	"All In"	Nominated	

== Release history ==
Release history and formats for The Clan Pt. 1 Lost
Region	Date	Format	Label
South Korea	May 18, 2016	CD; digital download; streaming	Starship Entertainment; LOEN Entertainment
Various	May 18, 2016	Digital download; streaming	Starship Entertainment; LOEN Entertainment

== See also ==
- List of K-pop songs on the Billboard charts
- List of K-pop albums on the Billboard charts
- List of K-pop songs on the World Digital Song Sales chart
