= I.M =

South Korean rapper (born 1996)

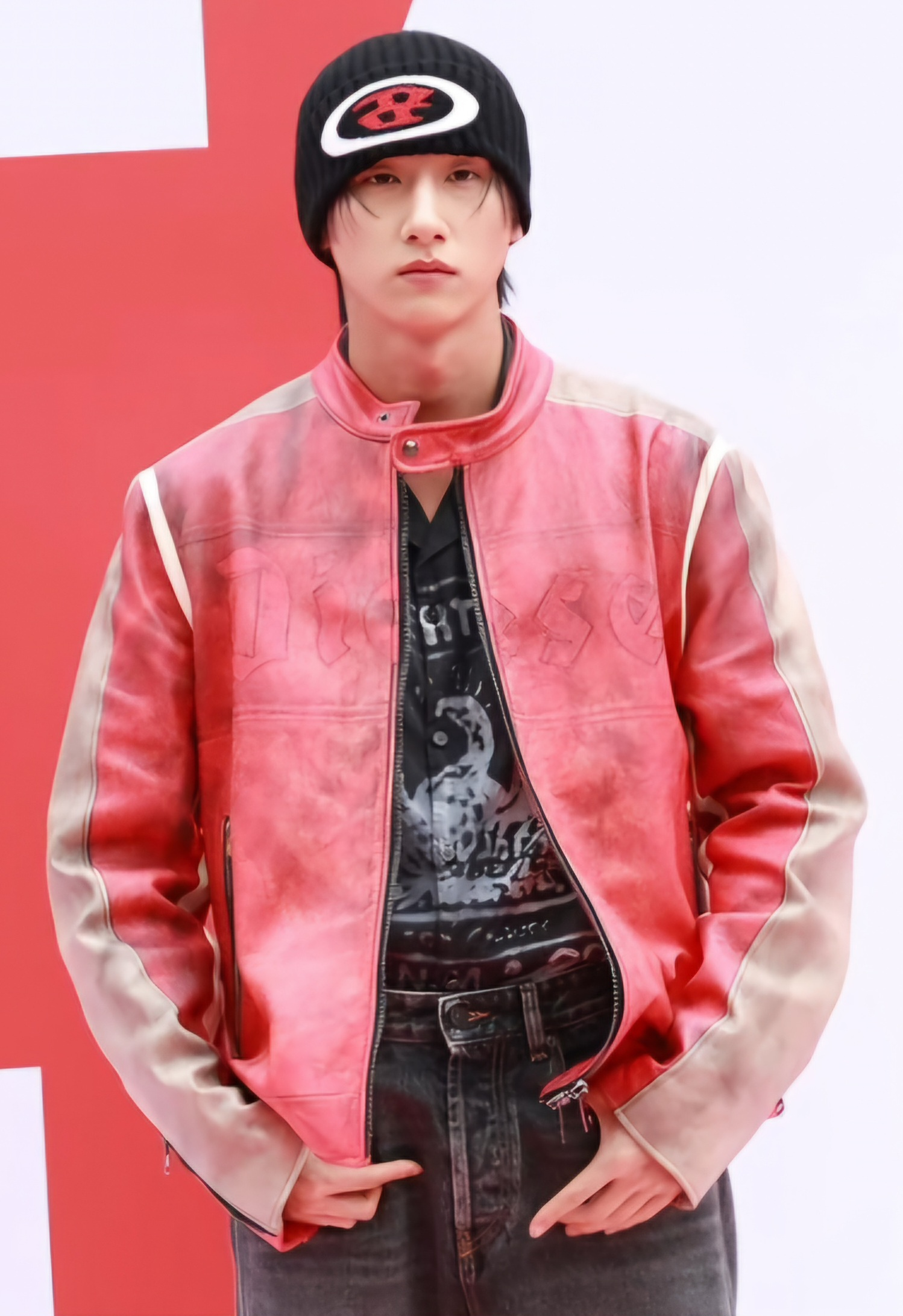
- I.M in July 2024
- Born: Im Chang-kyun; January 26, 1996 (age 30); Gwangsan-gu, Gwangju, South Korea
- Occupations: Rapper; singer; songwriter; producer
- Musical career
- Genres: K-pop; hip hop; trap
- Instrument: Vocals
- Years active: 2015–present
- Labels: Starship; Sony Music Korea
- Member of: Monsta X; Coda Crew
- Website: imnameim.com

Korean name
- Hangul: 임창균
- Hanja: 任創均
- RR: Im Changgyun
- MR: Im Ch'anggyun

Signature
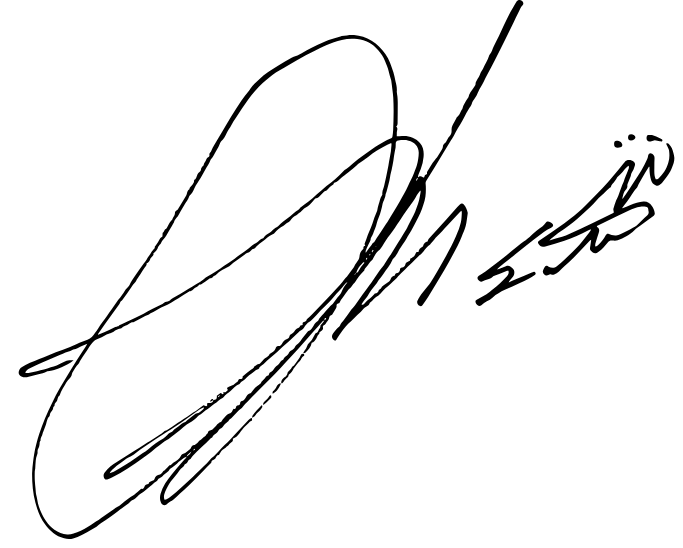

Im Chang-kyun (Korean: 임창균; born January 26, 1996), known by the stage name I.M or mononymously as Changkyun, is a South Korean rapper, singer, songwriter, and producer. He is a member of the South Korean boy group Monsta X under Starship Entertainment. He made his solo debut with the EP Duality in 2021.

== History ==
His stage name is based on the romanization of his family name "Im", while his English name is "Daniel", nicknamed as "Danny". The first language he learned was English and he learned Korean only upon entering primary school.

== Career ==
=== Early life and debut ===
I.M was born in Suwon, Gyeonggi-do, South Korea and Gwangsan-gu, Gwangju as his hometown on January 26, 1996. He spent most of his early years living abroad due to his father's work as a scientist, including living in Boston, Massachusetts, where I.M gained fluency in English, while his father worked at Harvard University.

Between 2013 and 2014, he became part of the boy group Nu'bility under Special K Entertainment but never officially debuted despite holding several events and performances.

I.M was a late addition to the Mnet's survival show No.Mercy, becoming the thirteenth competitor. Despite his late addition, he was one of the seven contestants chosen to debut in Starship Entertainment's new hip-hop boy group Monsta X.

=== 2015–2020: Monsta X and solo work ===
In May 2015, I.M debuted with Monsta X with their first EP Trespass, on which he has five writing credits.

In May 2016, I.M released his first mixtape through Starship Entertainment's YouTube channel, titled "Who Am I?" featuring Yeseo. On October 20, he released another mixtape titled "Madeleine" with Brother Su that featured J.Han.

In July 2017, I.M released a mixtape titled "Be My Friend", alongside group member Joohoney.

In February 2018, he released another solo mixtape titled "Fly With Me".

In April 2019, I.M released his mixtape, with the lead single "Horizon", which was a collaboration with the American artist ELHAE. He also released the song "Scent" as the B-side of the single.

In May 2020, I.M collaborated with ELHAE again, releasing the single "Need to Know". He also made his first solo appearance on the talk show Talk Talk Information Brunch.

=== 2021–present: Solo debut and other solo endeavors ===
In January 2021, I.M announced the solo work he had been preparing in 2020, would be released as his first solo album, with an intended release later in 2021. His first official release was announced to be an extended play titled Duality, which was released on February 19, with its lead single "God Damn". For his first EP, I.M was commended for showing a wider diversity of skill with the EP, with a noted difference in rap-style from his work in Monsta X as well as showcasing his abilities as singer-songwriter and composer. All five songs from the album charted on the weekly Billboard World Digital Song Sales chart, occupying twenty percent of the entire World Songs chart.

In July, he and other Monsta X members' Shownu and Hyungwon, took part in Pepsi's Taste of Korea summer campaign, releasing a promotional single "Summer Taste", with Rain, Brave Girls members' Yujeong and Yuna, and Ateez members' Hongjoong and Yunho.

In August, I.M was part of Baverse Studio's Welcome to My Baverse, which is a documentary where he can show his thoughts as a musician and as an idol group member.

On September 4, I.M released the single "Loop", as part of his work for Welcome to My Baverse, in which he contributed to the production and composition. On September 6, I.M became a new DJ for Naver Now's radio program Midnight Idol, alongside group member Kihyun.

In December, he appeared as one of the special judges in the Mnet's dance survival program Street Dance Girls Fighter's fourth mission, alongside group members Hyungwon and Joohoney, for Monsta X's B-side song "Autobahn".

In August 2022, I.M decided not to renew his contract with Starship Entertainment but will still continue to participate in the group's future plans. In November, Sony Music Korea announced that he signed an exclusive contract with the label for his solo activities.

In February 2023, I.M and Joohoney had a pictorial and an interview with the fashion and lifestyle magazine Vogue Korea. In March, he joined a mobile application Dear U bubble under "Bubble with Stars". I.M also decorated the cover of the fashion magazine 1st Look Korea's 254th issue. On April 19, Sony Music Korea released a video containing his new logo and announced the opening of his official site on May 16.

In May, he confirmed the release of his second extended play Overdrive on June 23, with the lead single of the same name. On August 5–6, I.M held the Overdrive Showcase Tour in Seoul at Yes24 Live Hall, which sold out within five minutes for both days. On September 3, he performed for Resffect Festival 2023, held at 88 Garden Olympic Park, Seoul. On October 13, I.M attended the launch event of BOSS' Korea-only capsule collection pop-up store, held at Oud Cafe in Seongsu-dong, Seoul.

On December 1, he attended the launch event of Swarovski's flagship store, held at Dosan Park in Seoul. On December 25, I.M performed for 2023 Someday Christmas, held at Hall 3 of BEXCO Exhibition Hall 1 in Busan.

In January 2024, it was announced that he will release a new single on January 23, titled "Slowly" featuring Heize.

On March 12, it was announced that I.M will have an April comeback. On March 13, it was revealed that he will release his third extended play Off the Beat on April 3, with the lead single "Lure". On March 28, I.M attended the boutique reopening of Brioni, held at Hotel Shilla in Jung-gu, Seoul.

On April 17, it was announced that he will be the MC of KBS' web show I.M on the Beat, beginning on April 20. On April 22, it was announced that I.M will have his first world tour Off the Beat, to be held in eighteen cities in ten countries. On April 23, he attended Chanel's "Rouge Allure" pop-up event opening, held in Seongdong-gu, Seoul.

On June 11, I.M attended Jaeger-LeCoultre's "The Adventure Spirit" pop-up event opening, held in Songpa-gu, Seoul. On June 15, he performed for Tone & Music Festival 2024, held at 88 Garden Olympic Park, Seoul. On June 18, it was announced that I.M will be the new DJ of KBS Cool FM's radio program Kiss the Radio, replacing Day6's Young K, beginning on July 1 and ending on June 29, 2025.

On July 19, he attended Diesel's store reopening, held in Gangnam-gu, Seoul. On July 20, I.M performed for Soundberry Festa 24, held at KBS Arena in Gangseo-gu, Seoul.

In February 2025, it was announced that he will perform for 2025 Soundberry Theater in March, to be held at KBS Arena in Gangseo-gu, Seoul.

In March, it was announced that I.M will release a digital single "Don't Speak" on March 28, which he already performed during the Off the Beat World Tour Encore in Seoul.

On May 18, I.M performed at the music festival SuperPop Korea 2025, held at KINTEX in Gyeonggi-do, Seoul. On May 24, it was announced that he will temporarily suspend his individual and group activities due to poor health.

In September, I.M had mutually agreed to terminate his exclusive contract with Sony Music Korea.

He released a digital single "IYWO" with Coda Crew on February 20, 2026.

== Personal life ==
=== Military service ===
I.M enlisted for his mandatory military service as an active duty soldier on February 9, 2026. On October 1–5, he performed for Ground Forces Festival (also known as Army Fest), held in Gyeryong, South Chungcheong Province.

== Artistry ==
=== Musical style and influences ===
As one of Monsta X's producer line, I.M made various musical attempts, contributing to broadening the musical spectrum of the group. He established the intense and powerful music color and framework unique to Monsta X, as well as presenting a variety of music, from songs with a dreamy and sensual mood to exciting songs that will enhance the atmosphere of a concert. As a solo artist, I.M incorporates various genres, such as trap, deep soul, R&B, and jazz in his releases, considered not a typical mainstream type of music and different from his usual songs produced for the group.

Upon growing up, he was influenced by his father's love for jazz, classical, and old pop music, specifically the Kenny G's saxophone albums and Norah Jones' albums, besides being particularly obsessed with Trevor Daniel's songs since their music tendencies are similar.

== Public image and impact ==
I.M, as an individual and a member of Monsta X, showed musical growth and ability, while building his own identity through the release of various mixtapes and developing his skills through steady music work. In addition to music, he became the group's practical spokesperson during their early overseas promotions due to his fluent English skills, while leading the interviews with famous overseas media such as the Chicago Tribune, BBC, and Forbes, marking him as an "all-round artist".

I.M dominates domestic and international charts with his solo releases. He was also consistently placed in Tumblr's "Most Popular K-pop Stars", ranking 60th in 2019, 53rd in 2020, 41st in 2021, and 83rd in 2022. I.M was also consistently ranked in the "Individual Boy Group Members Brand Power Ranking" published by the Korean Corporate Reputation Research Institute, ranking at 25th in July 2023 as his highest.

He was commemorated at the "K-pop Star Street", as part of Gwangju's 2021 cultural projects, alongside other Korean artists that represented the city in the global music scene. Billboard's 2023 International Power Player and Sony Music Korea's CEO/Managing Director Bobby Ju shared that signing him with the record label marked Sony as the first major label in South Korea to sign a "360 deal" with an established K-pop star. It was also emphasized that Ju's inclusion on the said Billboard list was due to I.M's "global success". The replica of his jacket used in The Connect World Tour was presented at 2023 Swarovski Crystal World's "The Art of Performance", an exhibition of art pieces with world stars.

He had been cited by DKB's Harry-June as a role model. I.M also inspired All(H)Ours' Xayden through watching his direct cams.

== Other ventures ==
=== Arts and photography ===
In November 2023, I.M released his first photobook Here I.M, which contained his current status, solo career journey, and values regarding music.

=== Endorsements ===
In June 2021, I.M was chosen as an advertising model for the Italian luxury fashion brand Versace's Eros Fragrance perfume through the Korean fashion, beauty, and life magazine Singles. In July, he participated in the global beverage brand Pepsi's "Taste of Korea" summer campaign, with Rain, Monsta X members' Shownu and Hyungwon, Brave Girls members' Yujeong and Yuna, and Ateez members' Hongjoong and Yunho.

In November 2023, I.M collaborated with the English football and rugby sportswear brand Umbro, promoting its 2023 F/W collection through the men's magazine Esquire Korea.

=== Philanthropy ===
In January 2022, I.M donated ₩500,000 through the idol fandom community service My Favorite Idol, in commemoration of his birthday, which will be delivered to the Miral Welfare Foundation and used as a fund for the disabled who are isolated due to COVID-19.

=== Production ===
In February 2019, I.M narrated an audiobook, Oscar Wilde's The Happy Prince, which was released through Naver's Audioclip. That same year, he narrated two more audiobooks, Edgar Allan Poe's Annabelle Lee and William Wordsworth's My Heart Leaps Up, alongside group member Shownu, which were also released through Naver's Audioclip, as well as to help the visually impaired people as the main purpose.

In September 2021, I.M was included in the production of the album cover image work and details through the Baverse Studio, as part of his work for Welcome to My Baverse.

I.M's Official Logo

In April 2023, he took the lead in the production process of his official logo, which was designed with chrome material to give it a "stylish look", where his "philosophy" and "style" are implied.

== Discography ==
=== Extended plays ===
List of extended plays, with selected details, chart positions and sales
Title	Details	Peak chart positions		Sales
Title	Details	KOR	JPN Hot	Sales
Duality	Released: February 19, 2021 and April 20, 2023; Label: Starship Entertainment; Formats: LP, digital download, streaming audio	44	—	KOR: 4,895
Overdrive	Released: June 23, 2023; Label: Sony Music Korea; Formats: CD, digital download, streaming audio	6	36	KOR: 129,863
Off the Beat	Released: April 3, 2024; Label: Sony Music Korea; Formats: CD, digital download, streaming audio	5	—	KOR: 119,465
"—" denotes releases that did not chart or were not released in that region.

=== Singles ===
==== As lead artist ====
List of singles, showing year released, chart positions, sales and album name
Title	Year	Peak chart positions		Sales	Album
Title	Year	KOR	US World	Sales	Album
"God Damn"	2021	— (Note: "God Damn" did not enter on the Digital Chart but appeared at number 72 on the component Download Chart.)	9	Undisclosed	Duality
"Overdrive"	2023	— (Note: "Overdrive" did not enter on the Circle Digital Chart but appeared at number 8 on the component Download Chart.)	—	Undisclosed	Overdrive
"Slowly" (feat. Heize)	2024	174	—	Undisclosed	Non-album single
"Lure"	2024	— (Note: "Lure" did not enter on the Circle Digital Chart but appeared at number 63 on the component Download Chart.)	—	Undisclosed	Off the Beat
"Don't Speak"	2025	— (Note: "Don't Speak" did not enter on the Circle Digital Chart but appeared at number 167 on the component Download Chart.)	—	Undisclosed	Non-album single
"—" denotes releases that did not chart or were not released in that region.

==== As featured artist ====
List of singles as featured artist, showing year released, chart positions, sales and album name
Title	Year	Peak chart positions	Sales	Album
Title	Year	KOR	Sales	Album
"0 (Young)" (Jooyoung, Mad Clown, and Giriboy feat. No.Mercy contestants)	2015	71	KOR: 43,760	No.Mercy OST Part 3
"Flower Cafe" (Joohoney feat. I.M and Sam Ock)	2015	—	Undisclosed	Flower Cafe
"Distance" (Heize feat. I.M)	2022	— (Note: "Distance" did not enter on the Digital Chart but appeared at number 45 on the component Download Chart.)	Undisclosed	Undo
"Runnin'" (Moon Su-jin feat. I.M)	2024	—	Undisclosed	Non-album single
"Love Virus" (Heize feat. I.M)	2025	— (Note: "Love Virus" did not enter on the Digital Chart but appeared at number 16 on the component Download Chart.)	Undisclosed	Love Virus Pt.1
"—" denotes releases that did not chart or were not released in that region.

==== Collaborative singles ====
List of collaborative singles, showing year released, chart positions, sales and album name
Title	Year	Peak chart positions		Sales	Album
Title	Year	KOR	US World	Sales	Album
"Feedback" (with Kisum, Bora, Lil Cham, and Jace)	2015	18	—	KOR: 96,633	Non-album single
"Interstellar" (with Hyungwon and Joohoney feat. Yella Diamond)	2015	—	—	Undisclosed	Trespass
"Moon" (with Astro, Viviz, Minhyuk, Kihyun, Hoshi, Wonwoo, Mingyu, DK, Seungkwan, Hello Gloom, Rocky, Yoojung, Doyeon, Chani, Bang Chan, and Moon Sua)	2025	— (Note: "Moon" did not enter on the Circle Digital Chart but appeared at number 61 on the component Download Chart.)	4	Undisclosed	Non-album single
"IYWO" (with Coda Crew)	2026	—	—	Undisclosed	Non-album single
"—" denotes releases that did not chart or were not released in that region.

==== Promotional singles ====
List of promotional singles, showing year released, chart positions and album name
Title	Year	Peak chart positions	Album
Title	Year	KOR DL	Album
"Summer Taste" (Note: "Summer Taste" was released as a promotional single in collaboration with Pepsi.) (with Rain, Shownu, Hyungwon, Yujeong and Yuna (Brave Girls), and Hongjoong and Yunho (Ateez))	2021	54	Taste of Korea

=== Other charted songs ===
List of other charted songs, showing year released, chart positions and album name
Title	Year	Peak chart positions	Album
Title	Year	US World	Album
"Howlin'"	2021	17	Duality
"Burn"	2021	21	Duality
"Happy to Die"	2021	19	Duality
"시든 꽃" (Flower-ed)	2021	20	Duality
"Loop"	2021	20	Loop

=== Mixtapes ===
Title	Year	Album	Artist(s)	Ref.
"Who Am I?"	2016	Non-album single	I.M feat. Yeseo	
"Madeleine"	2016	Non-album single	I.M and Brother Su feat. J.Han	
"Be My Friend"	2017	Non-album single	I.M and Joohoney	
"Fly With Me"	2018	Non-album single	I.M	
"Horizon"	2019	Horizon	I.M and ELHAE	
"Scent"	2019	Horizon	I.M	
"Need to Know"	2020	Non-album single	I.M and ELHAE	

=== Music videos ===
Title	Year	Artist	Director	Ref.
"Fly With Me"	2018	I.M	Shot Monster	
"Horizon"	2019	I.M and ELHAE	Highqualityfish	
"God Damn"	2021	I.M	Highqualityfish	
"Summer Taste"	2021	I.M, Rain, Shownu, Hyungwon, Yujeong and Yuna (Brave Girls), and Hongjoong and Yunho (Ateez)	Choi Young-ji (PinkLabel Visual)	
"Loop"	2021	I.M	Yeji Margo Lee (RGB House)	
"Overdrive"	2023	I.M	Rigend Film	
"Lure"	2024	I.M	Bang Jae-yeob	
"Don't Speak"	2025	I.M	Noh Seung-yong	

== Filmography ==
=== Television shows ===
Year	Title	Role	Note	Ref.
2014–2015	No.Mercy	Contestant	6th member announced as part of Monsta X	
2021	Street Dance Girls Fighter	Special Judge	with Hyungwon and Joohoney	

=== Web shows ===
Year	Title	Role	Note	Ref.
2024	I.M on the Beat	MC	Season 1	
2025	Debut's Plan	Special Trainer	Episode 4	

=== Radio shows ===
Year	Title	Role	Note	Ref.
2021–2022	Midnight Idol	DJ	with Kihyun	
2024–2025	Kiss the Radio	DJ		

=== Audiobook narrator ===
Year	Title	Note	Ref.
2019	The Happy Prince		
2019	Annabel Lee	with Shownu	
2019	My Heart Leaps Up	with Shownu	

== Bibliography ==
Year	Title	Category	Ref.
2023	Here I.M	Photobook	

== Tours and concerts ==
=== World tours ===
- Off the Beat World Tour (2024)

== Awards and nominations ==
Name of the award ceremony, year presented, category, recipient of the award and the result of the nomination
Award ceremony	Year	Category	Recipient	Result	Ref.
Brand Customer Loyalty Award (Note: Co-organized by the Korean Customers Council and Brand Keys, this event recognizes the most influential brands in society and culture, as determined through consumer research.)	2022	Most Influential Live Streaming Show DJ	Midnight Idol (with Kihyun)	Nominated	
KBS Entertainment Awards	2025	Digital Content Award (Note: Shared with the whole cast.)	Idol 1N2D	Won	
Seoul Music Awards	2025	R&B / Hip-Hop Award	I.M	Nominated	

== See also ==
- List of K-pop on the Billboard charts
