= No Limit Tour =

2022 concert tour by Monsta X

Monsta X Tour: No Limit
- Tour by Monsta X
- Location: Asia; North America
- Associated album: No Limit
- Start date: May 21, 2022
- End date: September 4, 2022
- Legs: 2
- No. of shows: 3 in Asia; 10 in North America; 13 in Total

Monsta X concert chronology
- Monsta X Live From Seoul With Luv (2020); Monsta X Tour: No Limit (2022); The X: Nexus World Tour (2026)

No Limit Tour, also known as Monsta X Tour: No Limit, is the fourth concert tour by the South Korean boy group Monsta X following their successful online live concert Live From Seoul With Luv in 2020, and their first since We Are Here World Tour in 2019, due to COVID-19 pandemic. Originally, it was supposed to be a U.S. tour only, which started on May 21, six months after the release of their tenth EP No Limit, is presented by Lexus, kicking off in New York City, and then visiting eight more states including Virginia, Michigan, Illinois, Florida, Georgia, Texas, Arizona, and California, but on a later date, Seoul had been added.

== Background ==
=== 2020 ===
On January 13, Starship Entertainment released the teaser poster for Monsta X's world tour through the group's official SNS channel, with their first performance to be held in Seoul, at the Olympic Gymnastics Arena from May 9 to 10.

On April 6, the agency posted a notice on social media that the Seoul concert in May had been cancelled due to concerns about the spread of COVID-19 and it would secure a new Seoul concert schedule while monitoring the situation.

In May, Starship Entertainment announced that their North American tour, which was scheduled to be held in the U.S. and Canada from June to July, is temporarily postponed. This decision was made to protect the health of the audience, artists, and staff.

On July 14, Monsta X had decided to hold an overseas tour, which has been postponed due to COVID-19, in the end of next year. Their agency announced this news through their official SNS.

On August 9, Monsta X held their first online live concert Live From Seoul With Luv, presented by LiveXLive.

=== 2021 ===
As announced from last year, Monsta X was scheduled to hold their world tour in the U.S. and Canada, beginning April 20 until May 21, and will be visiting fourteen cities, starting in Washington, D.C. and then hold their final concert in Los Angeles.

As it was postponed for the second time, Monsta X released their first documentary film and concert film Monsta X: The Dreaming to appease the disappointment of the face-to-face meeting with their fans, who are limited by the current situation.

=== 2022 ===
Monsta X 2022 No Limit Tour in Seoul

After postponing their planned North American tour twice due to the COVID-19 pandemic, Monsta X announced the new dates, beginning January 20 until February 27, and will be visiting thirteen cities, starting in New York and then hold their final concert in Los Angeles.

After the postponement at a later date, Monsta X successfully conducted their U.S. tour in three years, which began on May 21 until June 11, starting in New York and then held their final concert in Los Angeles.

In September, Monsta X held their Seoul tour for three days, at the SK Olympic Handball Gymnasium, located at Seoul Olympic Park, on September 2, 3 and 4.

== Promotion ==
During Monsta X's 3-days Seoul tour, Dalcomsoft's rhythm game Superstar Starship held field event, wherein booth at the group's concert site, their physical card goods are provided when you purchase a song play event, mission certification, and promotional products that are only held on site.

== Release ==
On the last day of Monsta X's Seoul performance, it has received a lot of response from field communication after a long time, as well as a LAN communication through the online live concert streaming service and concert series Beyond Live.

== Commercial performance ==
Monsta X showed overwhelming ticket power by selling out all seats for the 3-days Seoul tour, at the same time as the fan club pre-sale tickets were opened.

== Setlist ==
INTRO VCR

1. "Gambler"
2. "Dramarama"
3. "Rush Hour"

MENT

4. "Heaven"^{[a]}
5. "Just Love"^{[b]}
6. "Burning Up" (feat. R3hab)

MENT

7. "One Day"
8. "Play It Cool"

MENT

9. "You Problem"

VCR

10. "Find You"
11. "U R"^{[a]}
12. "And"^{[b]}

MENT

13. "Wildfire" – Hyungwon
14. "God Damn" and "Happy to Die" – I.M
15. "Ongsimi" – Minhyuk
16. "Rain" – Kihyun
17. "Smoky" and "Voices" – Joohoney

VCR

18. "Mercy"
19. "Love Killa"

MENT

20. "Love"

MENT

21. "Beastmode"
22. "Zone"
23. "Fallin'"

MENT

24. "Stand Together"

ENDING MENT

25. "Saranghanda"

ENDING VCR

Notes:

- ^{^[a]} included in the Seoul setlist only
- ^{^[b]} included in the United States setlist only

== Tour dates ==
List of concerts, showing date, city, country, venue and attendance
Date	City	Country	Venue	Attendance
North America
May 21, 2022	New York City	United States	Radio City Music Hall	Undisclosed
May 24, 2022	Fairfax	United States	EagleBank Arena	Undisclosed
May 26, 2022	Detroit	United States	Fox Theatre	Undisclosed
May 28, 2022	Chicago	United States	Chicago Theatre	Undisclosed
May 29, 2022	Chicago	United States	Chicago Theatre	Undisclosed
June 1, 2022	Sunrise	United States	FLA Live Arena	Undisclosed
June 4, 2022	Duluth	United States	Gas South Arena	Undisclosed
June 6, 2022	Fort Worth	United States	Dickies Arena	Undisclosed
June 8, 2022	Phoenix	United States	Arizona Federal Theatre	Undisclosed
June 11, 2022	Inglewood	United States	Kia Forum	Undisclosed
Asia
September 2, 2022	Seoul	South Korea	SK Olympic Handball Gymnasium; Beyond Live (Note: September 4 only.)	Undisclosed
September 3, 2022	Seoul	South Korea	SK Olympic Handball Gymnasium; Beyond Live	Undisclosed
September 4, 2022	Seoul	South Korea	SK Olympic Handball Gymnasium; Beyond Live	Undisclosed
