= Live From Seoul With Luv =

Concert by Monsta X

- Online concert by Monsta X
- Associated album: All About Luv
- Start date: August 9, 2020
- Duration: 2 hours & 30 minutes
- Website: LivexLive.com/MonstaX

Monsta X concert chronology
- Monsta X World Tour: We Are Here (2019); Monsta X Live From Seoul With Luv (2020); Monsta X Tour: No Limit (2022)

Live From Seoul With Luv (Korean: 라이브 프롬 서울 위드 러브), is the first online live concert by South Korean boy group Monsta X. It was live-streamed through LiveXLive on August 9, 2020. Originally, the group planned to conduct their fourth world tour, but the offline performance was canceled due to COVID-19 pandemic, and an online paid concert was held.

== Background ==
On June 22, Starship Entertainment announced that Monsta X is ready to take the stage, for their one and only live-streamed concert, later this summer. Presented by LiveXLive (now LiveOne), it will take place on July 25 and feature the group performing a combination of English-language tracks from their studio album All About Luv and Korean-language hits for a one-of-a-kind show. The virtual event also promises to include exclusive behind-the-scenes footage of the sextet, as well as VIP experiences like exclusive Monsta X merch and online meet and greets with fans.

On July 13, the agency announced that the online concert will be delayed and to be live-streamed two weeks later on August 9 due to Shownu's left eye retinal detachment surgery recovery.

On August 6, Monsta X surprise reveals the practice site ahead of their online concert performance.

On September 24, the exclusive behind-the-scenes footage of Monsta X's rehearsals and performances were released through Naver V Live's channel, from episodes 191 to 194, a total of four episodes.

== Viewership ==
On August 11, Starship Entertainment announced that the concert, with the price that ranges from $19.99 to $149.99, was viewed from 126 countries around the world.

== Impact ==
According to LiveXLive, this recent PPV event with Monsta X sold out the VIP tickets in under two minutes, and regular ticket sales for the live-stream added up to the equivalent of a sold out show at Staples Center.

The company also announced that the international PPV event with the group sold out all of $149.99 VIP packages in just two minutes and breaks one day sales record.

Monsta X's online concert also topped that week's overall virtual concerts.

== Setlist ==
1. "Follow"
2. "Dramarama"

MENT

3. "Play It Cool"
4. "Monsta Truck"

MENT^{[a]}

5. "Happy Without Me"
6. "Middle of the Night"

MENT

7. "Flow"

VCR

MENT^{[b]}

8. "Misbehave"
9. "Who Do U Love?"

MENT

10. "Shoot Out"
11. "Hero"

MENT

12. "Fantasia"

VCR^{[c]}

ENDING MENT

13. "Stand Up"

Notes:

- ^{^[a]} Special Talk With Luv (#HOW_I_STAY_AT_HOME)
- ^{^[b]} Special Talk With Luv (#BEHIND_THE_SCENE)
- ^{^[c]} By My Side (Self MV)

== Personnel ==
Artists

- Shownu
- Minhyuk
- Kihyun
- Hyungwon
- Joohoney
- I.M

Presented

- Starship Entertainment
- LiveXLive

Organized

- Shownote
- CJ ENM

Ticketing

- LiveXLive
