= We Are Here World Tour =

2019 concert tour by Monsta X

Monsta X World Tour: We Are Here
- World tour by Monsta X
- Location: Asia; Europe; North America; Oceania; South America
- Associated album: Take.2 We Are Here
- Start date: April 13, 2019
- End date: September 4, 2019
- Legs: 5
- No. of shows: 8 in Asia; 2 in Oceania; 5 in Europe; 7 in North America; 1 in South America; 23 in Total

Monsta X concert chronology
- Monsta X World Tour: The Connect (2018); Monsta X World Tour: We Are Here (2019); Monsta X Live From Seoul With Luv (2020)

We Are Here World Tour, also known as Monsta X World Tour: We Are Here, is the third worldwide concert tour by the South Korean boy group Monsta X following their successful and sold out world tour for the previous year The Connect World Tour. The tour started on April 13, two months after the release of the group's second Korean-language studio album Take.2 We Are Here, kicking off in Seoul, and then visiting twelve more countries including Thailand, Australia, Malaysia, Spain, Netherlands, France, United Kingdom, Germany, Brazil, Mexico, United States, and Japan.

== Background ==
=== Asia ===
In March, their third world tour was announced, including eighteen cities, having the first show held in Seoul at the SK Olympic Handball Gymnasium located at Seoul Olympic Park on April 13 and 14. On March 13, Starship Entertainment revealed that the tickets for their two days Seoul concert had sold out within seventy seconds upon the release on March 12 for four consecutive years.

Before the concert on June 1 in Bangkok, the group held a press conference, in front of the local media in Thailand, and delivered some news about their album activities, their third world tour, and their plans for the future. About seventy media outlets, including some of the local TV, newspapers, magazines, and internet news, gathered at the press conference room to cover their world tour performance, and about a hundred reporters. In particular, Rueng Lao Chao Nee of Thai terrestrial TV Channel 3, Channel 7, and Channel 9, and national broadcaster NBT visited the conference room and competed for coverage. In addition, many of the influential daily newspapers such as Thairath, Daily News, Naewna, and Manager Daily, which are called as the most influential newspapers in the country, participated and showed off the power of the global trend.

On June 22, Starship Entertainment announced that the group member Wonho will not be attending the concert in Malaysia due to the loss of his passport and could not enter Malaysia.

=== Australia ===
It was Monsta X's first time to have a world tour in Australia. They performed at ICC Sydney Theater in Sydney on June 5 and at Margaret Court Arena in Melbourne on June 8.

=== Europe ===
After the tour in Australia, the group headed to Europe. Starting with the concert held at Palacio Vistalegre in Madrid on June 29, Monsta X performed at AFAS Live in Amsterdam on July 3, La Seine Musicale in Paris on July 6, SSE Arena Wembley in London on July 9, and ending it at Mercedes-Benz Arena in Berlin on July 13.

In Europe, the concert brought the group media attention, including attending and performing on a famous local morning TV show Good Morning Britain.

=== Americas ===
Monsta X held the tour around the United States of America which started on July 25 at Verizon Theatre in Dallas and ended on August 10 at Staples Center in Los Angeles. During their stay, they had sold-out shows and interviews, with local and nationwide TV programs, such as Good Morning America and Jimmy Kimmel Live!, broadcast on ABC, magazines such as Billboard, Forbes, and Chicago Tribune, which are all influential media outlets in the United States, as well as internet and radio shows such as 102.3 KIIS-FM's Jojo on the Radio and iHeartRadio's affiliated channels.

== Critical reception ==
Sarah Deen of Metro gave them and described the tour as "upgraded show that was part concert and part rave", all fierce but with what felt like "a new-found confidence". Deen also commended their more "mature and experimental sound" that brought life into their stages.

== Impact ==
Monsta X had conducted various live broadcasts on Naver V Live, including a coverage of their scheduled performance at the Staples Center, which annually hosted the Grammy Awards and had featured performances by renowned artists.

Monsta X also became the first K-pop artist to appear on a live broadcast of the morning news program Good Morning Britain, of the British ITV channel, drawing the attention of global fans.

Monsta X was the first Korean artist to participate and appeared in the popular American animation We Bare Bears, and this episode was made through communication between Daniel Chong and their fans club. In particular, through the broadcast, the group directly dubbed English with their own voices, adding a sense of reality to the sitcom, which was broadcast in about 200 countries around the world, which received a lot of attention from fans around the world as well as local fans.

== Setlist ==
INTRO VCR

1. "Shoot Out"
2. "Hero"
3. "Trespass"

MENT

4. "Party Time"
5. "Play It Cool"

MENT

6. "Miss You"^{[a]}
7. "Mohae"
8. "Jealousy"

VCR

9. "Myself" of Bazzi – Minhyuk, Kihyun, and Hyungwon
10. "SamBakJa" (Triple Rhythm) – Joohoney and I.M
11. "Mirror" – Shownu and Wonho

MENT

12. "Honestly"^{[a]}
13. "I'll Be There"^{[a]}
14. "I Do Love U"
15. "White Sugar"

MENT

16. "No Reason"

VCR

17. "Myself"^{[a]}
18. "Who Do U Love?"^{[b]}
19. "Dramarama"
20. "Spotlight"^{[a]}

MENT

21. "Oh My"
22. "Special"
23. "Fallin'"

MENT

24. "Alligator"
25. DJ H.One Stage Set
26. "Rodeo"

ENDING MENT

27. "By My Side"

Notes:

- ^{^[a]} included in the Seoul setlist only
- ^{^[b]} included in the International setlist only
- Japan had a different setlist which included Japanese songs

== Tour dates ==
List of concerts, showing date, city, country, venue and attendance
Date	City	Country	Venue	Attendance
Asia
April 13, 2019	Seoul	South Korea	SK Olympic Handball Gymnasium	10,000
April 14, 2019	Seoul	South Korea	SK Olympic Handball Gymnasium	10,000
June 1, 2019	Bangkok	Thailand	Thunder Dome	Undisclosed
Oceania
June 5, 2019	Sydney	Australia	ICC Sydney Theater	Undisclosed
June 8, 2019	Melbourne	Australia	Margaret Court Arena	Undisclosed
Asia
June 22, 2019	Kuala Lumpur	Malaysia	Malawati Indoor Stadium	5,000
Europe
June 29, 2019	Madrid	Spain	Palacio Vistalegre	Undisclosed
July 3, 2019	Amsterdam	Netherlands	AFAS Live	Undisclosed
July 6, 2019	Paris	France	La Seine Musicale	Undisclosed
July 9, 2019	London	United Kingdom	SSE Arena Wembley	Undisclosed
July 13, 2019	Berlin	Germany	Mercedes-Benz Arena	Undisclosed
South America
July 19, 2019	São Paulo	Brazil	Espaço Das Américas	Undisclosed
North America
July 21, 2019	Mexico City	Mexico	Teatro Metropólitan	Undisclosed
July 25, 2019	Dallas	United States	Verizon Theatre	Undisclosed
July 27, 2019	Houston	United States	Smart Financial Centre	Undisclosed
July 30, 2019	Atlanta	United States	Fox Theatre	Undisclosed
August 3, 2019	New York City	United States	Hulu Theater	Undisclosed
August 6, 2019	Chicago	United States	Rosemont Theatre	Undisclosed
August 10, 2019	Los Angeles	United States	Staples Center	9,155
Asia
August 21, 2019	Chiba	Japan	Makuhari Event Hall	32,000
August 22, 2019	Chiba	Japan	Makuhari Event Hall	32,000
September 3, 2019	Osaka	Japan	Osaka-jō Hall	32,000
September 4, 2019	Osaka	Japan	Osaka-jō Hall	32,000

=== Boxscore ===
Venue	City	Tickets sold / available	Gross revenue
Staples Center	Los Angeles	9,155 / 9,985 (91.7%)	$1,103,392
