= Monsta X: The Dreaming =

2021 South Korean documentary film

- Theatrical release poster
- Hangul: 몬스타엑스: 더 드리밍
- RR: Monseuta ekseu: deo deuriming
- MR: Monsŭt'a eksŭ: tŏ tŭriming
- Directed by: Oh Yoon-dong; Sung Shin-hyo
- Written by: Ju Hye-lee
- Produced by: David Tu Sun Song; Hwang Hyun-ji
- Music by: Michael Turner
- Production companies: Starship Entertainment; Intertwine; CJ 4DPlex ScreenX Studio
- Distributed by: CJ 4DPlex (South Korea & Japan); Trafalgar Releasing (Worldwide)
- Release date: December 8, 2021
- Running time: 1 hour & 28 minutes
- Country: South Korea
- Languages: Korean; English

Monsta X: The Dreaming (Korean: 몬스타엑스: 더 드리밍) is a 2021 South Korean documentary film and concert film, directed by Oh Yoon-dong and Sung Shin-hyo, featuring South Korean boy group Monsta X. It was released on December 8 in South Korea, and on December 9 and 11 in more than seventy countries worldwide.

== Synopsis ==
This musical documentary features the famous K-pop group called Monsta X. It follows the lives of the group members throughout their evolution from household names in South Korea to worldwide popularity. The story chronicles of the last six years of their experiences, featuring individual interviews, snippets of their life on the road, performances of their hit songs, and an exclusive sneak peek into their forthcoming album, a gift to their fans.

It also includes a number of Monsta X's hit songs, as well as the recently released U.S. single "One Day" and songs from their second English-language album The Dreaming, which will be released on December 10.

== Cast ==
- Son Hyun-woo
- Lee Min-hyuk
- Yoo Ki-hyun
- Chae Hyung-won
- Lee Joo-heon
- Im Chang-kyun

== Production ==
=== History ===
South Korean boy group Monsta X debuted in 2015 and went into become one of the most successful K-pop acts. Releasing the film is a new challenge on the 6th year (7th in South Korea) of their debut, choosing the movie window to appease the disappointment of the face-to-face meeting with the fans, who are limited by the current situation (due to COVID-19 pandemic).

On October 29, Starship Entertainment announced that the first nationwide CGV will be released on December 8. The tickets went on sale on November 4.

=== Format ===
It provides the world's first multi-sensor function and more than 20 motion effects, from the ScreenX theater consisting of three sides including the front screen and the side screens, so that you can enjoy the effect of an actual live concert. It was also opened in special theaters at domestic CGVs and theaters around the world, such as the 4DX hall that provides 4DX and the 4DX Screen hall equipped with both ScreenX and 4DX functions, so that audiences around the world can enjoy it in various screening formats.

== Release ==
K-pop stars Monsta X lighten up the big screen in South Korea on December 8 and in more than seventy countries worldwide on December 9 and 11.

The film was released through LiveXLive, as part of a special PPV event on December 22, with tickets starting at $19.99 for the full concert film stream. The exclusive merch bundles and re-watch access were also available.

It was also released on KT Seezn, which is the only OTT that provides the film for free to subscribers, on February 14, 2022.

The movie will be available to stream on-demand through Veeps, beginning on January 1, 2024.

== Promotion ==
On December 9, the American entertainment media Splash captured and released Monsta X members who attended the worldwide premiere of the movie, held at the CGV located in Los Angeles.

== Reception ==
=== Critics ===
Ruby C of NME gave the film a rating of stating that their "collective confidence" and "self-assuredness" is evident throughout their first-ever concert film, adding that it also showed both the members' "serious" and "lighthearted" sides, while "expressing their opinions and visions for the performance stage".

=== Box office ===
In South Korea, CGV already announced that the film ranked first in the overall reservation rate, with 48.7% of the reservation market shares. It also sold out all seats for special screening event, with about 5,000 seats sold out all theaters within five minutes as soon as the reservation was opened.

On the first day of its release, the film mobilized more than 7,400 spectators and settled in the 5th place at the box office, recorded a 8.6% seat sales rate among the top 10 movies at the box office, setting a green light for the success of the box office.

The film placed 16th overall and earned $348,790 for December, shown in 98 theaters in South Korea.

The film placed 35th overall at the box office for 2021 in South Korea.

== See also ==
- List of South Korean films of 2021
- Impact of the COVID-19 pandemic on cinema
