= The Dreaming (Monsta X album) =

- Digital cover

Studio album by Monsta X
- Released: December 10, 2021
- Genre: Pop
- Length: 28:41
- Language: English
- Label: Intertwine

Monsta X chronology
No Limit (2021)	The Dreaming (2021)	Shape of Love (2022)

Singles from The Dreaming
- 1. "One Day" Released: September 10, 2021; 2. "You Problem" Released: December 10, 2021

The Dreaming is the ninth and the second English-language studio album by the South Korean boy group Monsta X. It was released and distributed by Intertwine on December 10, 2021.

== Background ==
The album was announced on October 21, following the release of the single "One Day" on September 10. There are ten tracks on the album, including "One Day" and nine new English tracks. Music video for the track "You Problem" was released alongside the album on December 10.

In December, the group released Monsta X: The Dreaming, a documentary film and concert film that follows the process of creating the album and the performances of the songs used in the film, including the interviews with all the members and footages of their history.

== Critical reception ==
Professional ratings
Aggregate scores
Source	Rating
Metacritic	71/100
Review scores
Source	Rating
AllMusic	3/5 stars
i	3/5 stars
IZM	3.5/5 stars
The Line of Best Fit	8/10 stars
musicOMH	3/5 stars
NME	4/5 stars
Rolling Stone	3.5/5 stars

The Dreaming was met with generally favorable reviews from its critics. At Metacritic, which assigns a normalized rating out of 100 to reviews from mainstream publications, the album received a weighted average score of 71 based on 5 reviews, indicating "generally favorable reviews".

Sophia Simon-Bashall, writing for The Line of Best Fit, said that the album was a combination of the signature sound of Monsta X's Korean releases with the group's first English-language album All About Luv, focusing on "bringing their energy and creativity to the songs, and showcasing the spectacular vocals they deserve to be known for". Overall, it was a diverse album that "showcases new sides of Monsta X whilst also meeting the ideas and feelings that fans look forward to".

Ben Devlin of musicOMH said that the album presents "an imperial core of its own music in recontextualised form", while the group displays "versatility, emotion and style" on their second English-language album.

While reviewing the album for NME, Ruby C wrote that the group shows different sides to themselves on their "stellar retro-themed sophomore English album", focusing on "disco and synth-pop", two genres that aren't typically associated with Monsta X, who are much better known for their "powerful, hard-hitting tunes", immersing themselves in "retro sounds and vibes". The "chameleon-like versatility" of the group is what showed in this album.

Tim Chan described the album for Rolling Stone as "an homage to boy-band culture with Nineties-style harmonies, slick choruses, and head-bopping beats", that also "showcases the group's versatility, mixing synth beats and EDM with indie pop, rock, and even traces of New Jack Swing".

=== Listicles ===
Name of critic or publication, name of listicle, name of work and rank
Critic/Publication	List	Work	Rank	Ref.
Song
Teen Vogue	The 54 Best K-pop Songs of 2021	"One Day"	Placed (Note: All the albums and songs listed are either unranked or just alphabetically ranked.)	
Teen Vogue	The 54 Best K-pop Songs of 2021	"You Problem"	Placed	

== Commercial performance ==
The album debuted at number 21 on the US Billboard 200 with 31,400 album-equivalent units, including 29,500 pure album sales on its first week. It is Monsta X's second entry on the said chart. It also succeeded in charting on the said chart for two weeks in a row.

== Track listing ==
The Dreaming track listing
No.	Title	Writer(s)	Producer(s)	Length
1.	"One Day"	Chelsea Lena; Jake Davis; Samuel Anthony Klempner	Jake Davis; Samuel Anthony Klempner	2:26
2.	"You Problem"	David Stewart	David Stewart	3:19
3.	"Tied to Your Body"	John Ryan; Marco Borrero; Stephenie Jones; Teddy Geiger	Afterhrs; John Ryan; Teddy Geiger	2:09
4.	"Whispers in the Dark"	Benjamin Harrison; Colton Avery; Kane John Parfitt; Madi Yanofsky	KIN.	3:40
5.	"Blame Me"	Jake Davis; Joe Kearns; Pablo Bowman; Tom Mann	Jake Davis; Taylor Wilzbach	3:08
6.	"Secrets"	Ben Berger; Iain James; Ryan McMahon; Ryan Rabin	Captain Cuts	3:00
7.	"About Last Night"	Brian Lee; Peter Nappi; Sean Kennedy; Upsahl	Brian Lee; Peter Nappi	2:33
8.	"Better"	Colin Magalong; Keith Varon; Naomi Abergel	Keith Varon	2:19
9.	"Blow Your Mind"	Alex Tidebrink; Kris Eriksson; Lina Hansson	Kris Eriksson	2:10
10.	"The Dreaming"	Ben West; Laura Veltz; Nate Cyphert	Ben West	3:57
Total length:				28:41

== Charts ==
Chart performance for The Dreaming
Chart (2021–2022)	Peak position
Belgian Albums (Ultratop Wallonia)	187
Canadian Albums (Billboard)	76
French Albums (SNEP)	116
German Albums (Offizielle Top 100)	63
Scottish Albums (OCC)	72
Swiss Albums (Schweizer Hitparade)	50
UK Digital Albums (OCC)	64
UK Independent Albums (OCC)	6
US Billboard 200	21
US Independent Albums (Billboard)	3

Chart performance for "One Day"
Chart (2021)	Peak position
Mexico Ingles Airplay (Billboard)	27
South Korea (Gaon) (Note: "One Day" did not enter on the Digital Chart but appeared on the component Download Chart.)	118
US Mainstream Top 40 (Billboard)	30

Chart performance for "You Problem"
Chart (2021)	Peak position
South Korea (Gaon) (Note: "You Problem" did not enter on the Digital Chart but appeared on the component Download Chart.)	140

== See also ==
- List of K-pop albums on the Billboard charts
- List of K-pop songs on the Billboard charts
