= Monsta X =

South Korean boy group

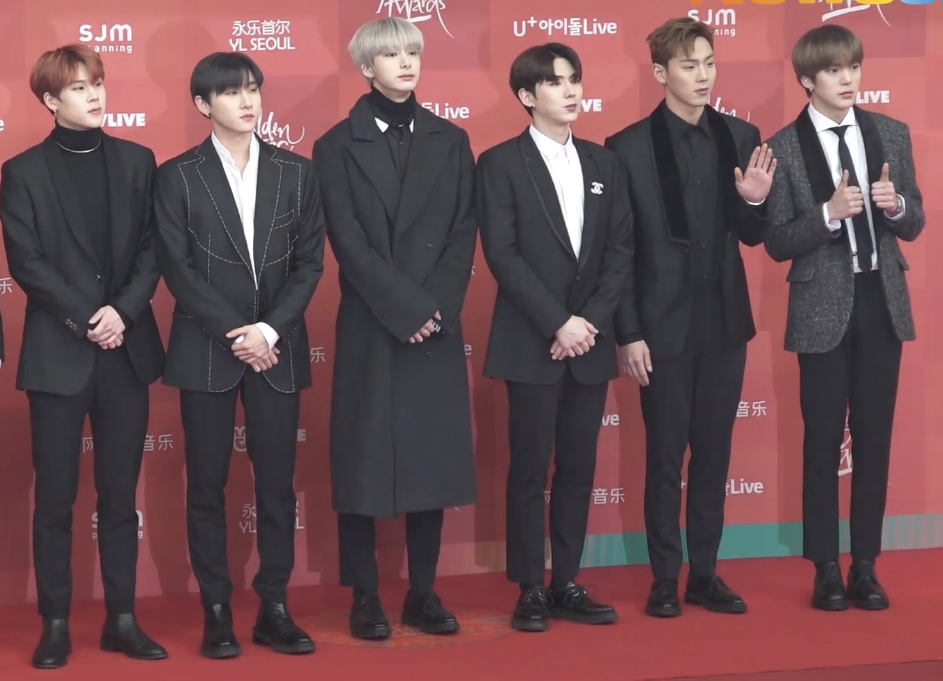
- Monsta X in 2019; Left to right: Joohoney, I.M, Hyungwon, Kihyun, Shownu, and Minhyuk

Background information
- Origin: Seoul, South Korea
- Genres: K-pop; pop; hip hop; trap; EDM; R&B
- Years active: 2015–present
- Labels: Starship; Mercury Tokyo; Intertwine; Epic
- Spinoffs: Shownu X Hyungwon
- Members: Shownu; Minhyuk; Kihyun; Hyungwon; Joohoney; I.M
- Past members: Wonho
- Website: monstax-e.com

Monsta X (Korean: 몬스타엑스; stylized as MONSTA X) is a South Korean boy group formed through the reality survival program No.Mercy under Starship Entertainment. The group is currently composed of six members: Shownu, Minhyuk, Kihyun, Hyungwon, Joohoney, and I.M, while former member Wonho left the group in October 2019. They debuted with their first EP Trespass on May 14, 2015.

In March 2017, Monsta X released their first studio album and final part of The Clan series The Clan Pt. 2.5: The Final Chapter. Since 2018, the group had four Japanese singles certified gold by the Recording Industry Association of Japan, while since 2019, ten of their Korean albums and extended plays had been certified platinum by the Korea Music Content Association. In 2020, the group's first English album All About Luv placed number five on the US Billboard 200 and number seven on the US Rolling Stone Top 200.

Since debut, they had been known for their aggressive style, combining elements of hip hop, EDM and pop. This aggressive style with "tracks centred around loud, clattering, electronic instrumentals, vicious rap verses, and striking vocals" had also been influential across the fourth generation of K-pop, and being credited in breaking gender norms before it was a trend. Since then, Monsta X had been called the "Next Generation Beast Idol".

== History ==
=== 2014–2015: No.Mercy and debut ===
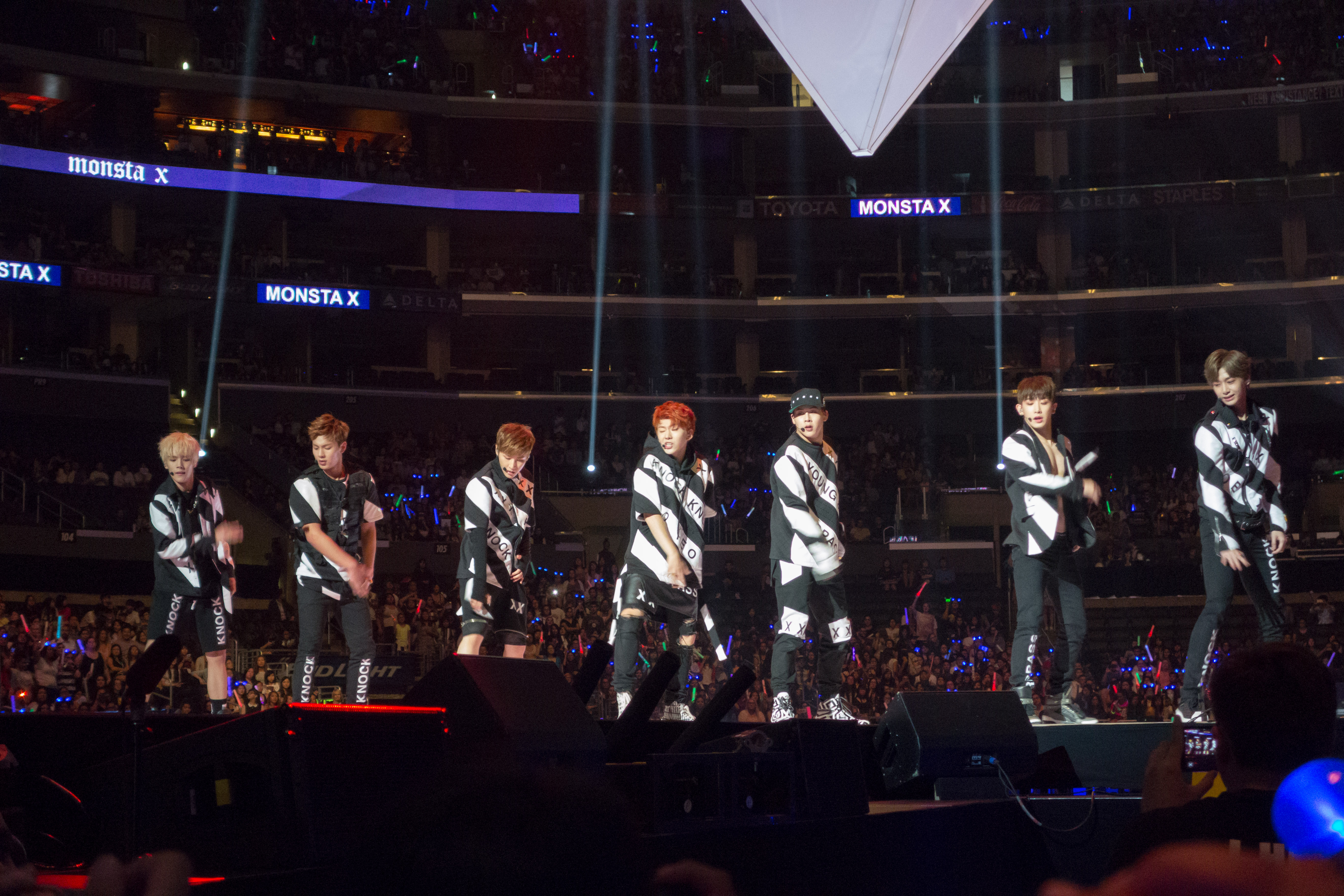
Monsta X at KCON 2015 in Los Angeles

The group was formed, as the result of the survival program called No.Mercy, which was launched by Starship Entertainment and Mnet in December 2014. Through the course of ten episodes, twelve trainees; thirteen after I.M joined in episode eight, competed against each other through various performances and were ranked from one to twelve, with one being the highest and twelve being the lowest. They also have to wear a nametag with their ranking, which changed following the challenges and performances set by the judges. For the show, the participants worked directly with artists from Starship Entertainment, including Hyolyn, K.Will, Mad Clown, and Soyou, as well as other artists such as Rhymer, San E, Giriboy, and Genius Nochang, who also served as judges in ranking the contestants. For the concluding mission, the nine remaining trainees formed into three groups of three to compete, while the members of Monsta X were selected from these nine in the final episode as the seven members of the group: Shownu, Wonho, Minhyuk, Kihyun, Hyungwon, Jooheon, and I.M.

No.Mercy also led to the 2014 spin-off web series Deokspatch, which also began airing in December, which was meant to showcase a more casual and lighthearted side to the competition in order for people to get to know the trainees better. It also continued as Deokspatch X in May 2015 and as Deokspatch X² in October. These seasons focused on their participation in variety show activities.

The group's name "Monsta X" contains the double meaning of "Monsters conquering the K-pop scene" and "My star" (Mon means "My" in French), then X symbolizes an unknown existence. Their fandom name "Monbebe" is also French for "My baby". Jooheon, Hyungwon, and I.M also released their song "Interstellar", which was produced for the final mission by Yella Diamond on February 12, 2015.

Monsta X made their debut with the release of their first extended play Trespass on May 14, 2015. "Trespass" is produced by Rhymer and described as a "strong and edgy track that reflects Monsta X's unique character". Trespass includes seven different tracks. Jooheon was the most involved member in the production of the mini-album and composed several songs, including "One Love", "Steal Your Heart", and "Blue Moon". I.M was also involved in the rap making of several songs. Kihyun and Wonho contributed song lyrics for the EP.

On September 1, the group returned with their second extended play titled Rush. The title track of the same name is described as a song that represents their signature style, that produced by Giriboy. Keone Madrid choreographed the dance and Joo Hee-sun directed the music video. The mini-album contains six tracks produced by Mad Clown, Crybaby and Rhymer. Jooheon also took part in making the rap for five out of the six tracks, while fellow member I.M was involved in four songs, including the title track "Rush". In 2015, they made their first U.S. appearance performing at KCON 2015 in Los Angeles. Monsta X received the "Next Generation Asian Artist" award at 2015 Mnet Asian Music Awards and the "1theK Performance Award" at 2015 Melon Music Awards.

=== 2016: Chinese ventures and first solo concert ===
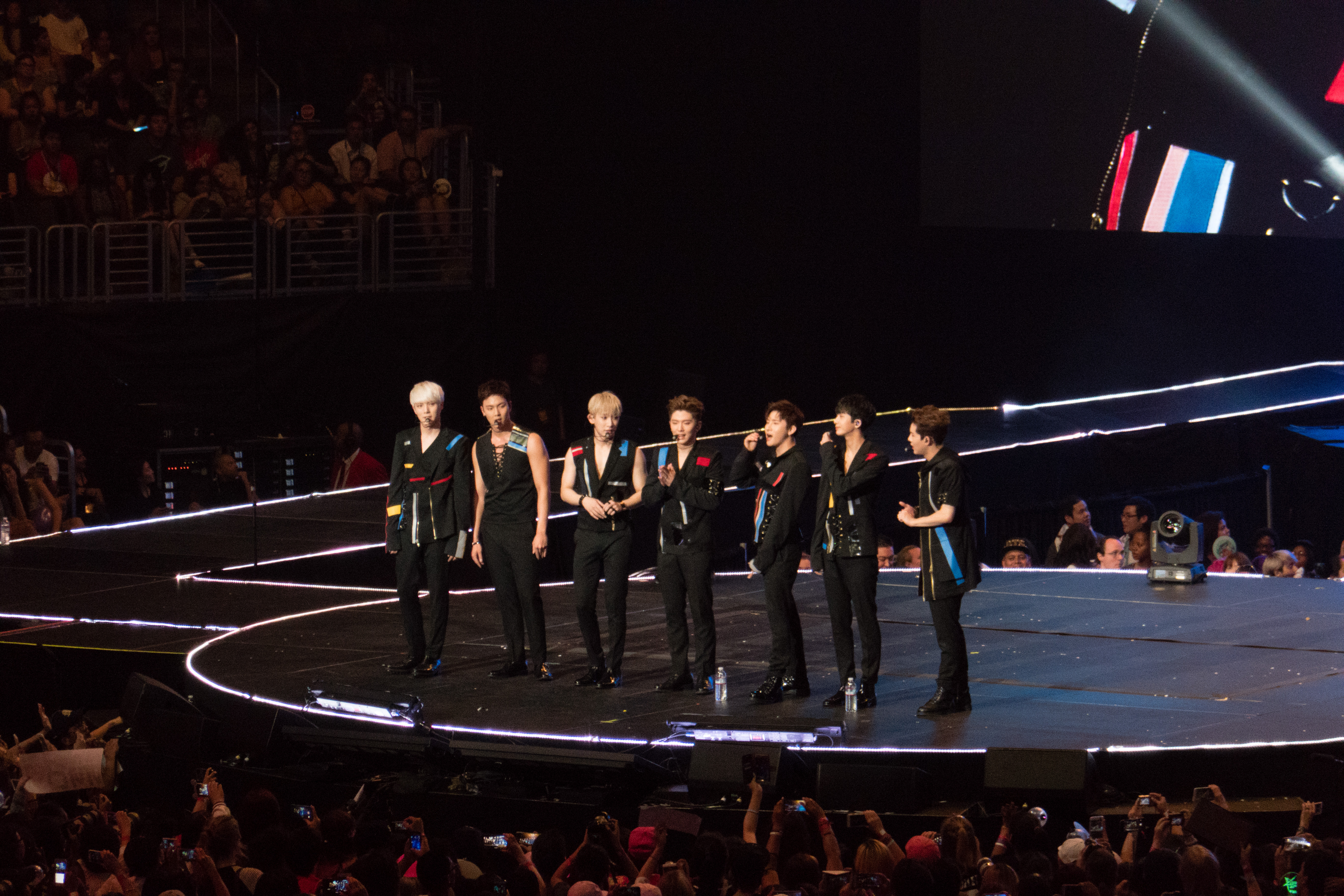
Monsta X at KCON 2016 in Los Angeles

In January, the group released a new variety program Monsta X Right Now!. The same month, they also appeared in a Chinese web drama Good Evening, Teacher, receiving positive responses from local viewers.

On May 9, Monsta X pre-released their single "Ex Girl", featuring Wheein of Mamamoo. On May 18, their third extended play The Clan Pt. 1 Lost, with the lead single "All In" was released. Its music video was directed by filmmaker Shin Dong-keul, a former winner at the Canada International Film Festival and is known for his dreamy and euphoric style in producing music videos. The EP debuted at number five on Billboard World Albums chart and stayed for two consecutive weeks on it. It is also the first part of The Clan series.

In June, the group participated on a Chinese survival program Heroes of Remix, which was aired on Jiangsu Television. The show holds a remix competition in the program and each one of the participants received a lesson from its assigned mentor and perform its stage by remixing representative Chinese music.

In July, they held their first solo concert The First Live "X-Clan Origins" from July 16 to July 17, which sold out in five minutes.

In August, Starship Entertainment formed a project group with Monsta X and their labelmate WJSN as part of a promotional project with KT. As part of its promotion, they released the single "Do Better", with an accompanying music video.

On October 4, Monsta X released their fourth extended play and second part of The Clan series The Clan Pt. 2 Guilty, alongside the title track "Fighter".

In December, the group received the "Best of Next Male Artist" award at 2016 Mnet Asian Music Awards.

=== 2017: First studio album, Japanese debut and first world tour ===
In January, they launched their own variety show Monsta X-Ray through JTBC2.

On March 21, Monsta X released their first studio album and the final part of The Clan series The Clan Pt. 2.5: The Final Chapter, with the title track "Beautiful". The album debuted at number one on the Billboard World Albums chart and at number ten on the Billboard Heatseekers Albums chart, while the title track "Beautiful" debuted and peaked at number four on the Billboard World Digital Song Sales chart.

On May 17, the group made their debut in Japan with a Japanese single, under Universal Music's new label Mercury Records Tokyo, which included Japanese versions of "Hero" and "Stuck". "Hero" reached number two on the weekly Oricon Singles Chart, number one on the Tower Records chart, and number three on the weekly Billboard Japan Hot 100 chart, making an impressive debut from a foreign artist.

On June 19, they released a repackaged version of The Clan Pt. 2.5: The Final Chapter called Shine Forever, which features the original songs from the album and two extra tracks "Shine Forever" and "Gravity", as well as the music video for "Shine Forever". The title track "Shine Forever" combines future bass and hip-hop styles and includes rap lyrics written by members Jooheon and I.M. Monsta X also began their first world tour Beautiful in June.

The group aired the second season of Monsta X-Ray in July. They also released a promotional single "Newton" on July 27. The music video for the single was produced by Yoo Sung-kyun of SunnyVisual.

On August 23, their second Japanese single was released. It contains the Japanese versions of "Beautiful" and "Ready or Not". It reached number one on Oricon's daily chart.

On November 7, Monsta X released their fifth extended play The Code, with title track "Dramarama". On the same day, the group held a comeback show at Jangchung Arena. On November 14, they won their first music broadcast award through SBS MTV's The Show with "Dramarama".

On December 18, Monsta X released a special single "Lonely Christmas" as a surprise holiday release for their fans. It was written, produced, and co-composed by Jooheon.

=== 2018: Second world tour, Japanese album and Take.1 Are You There? ===
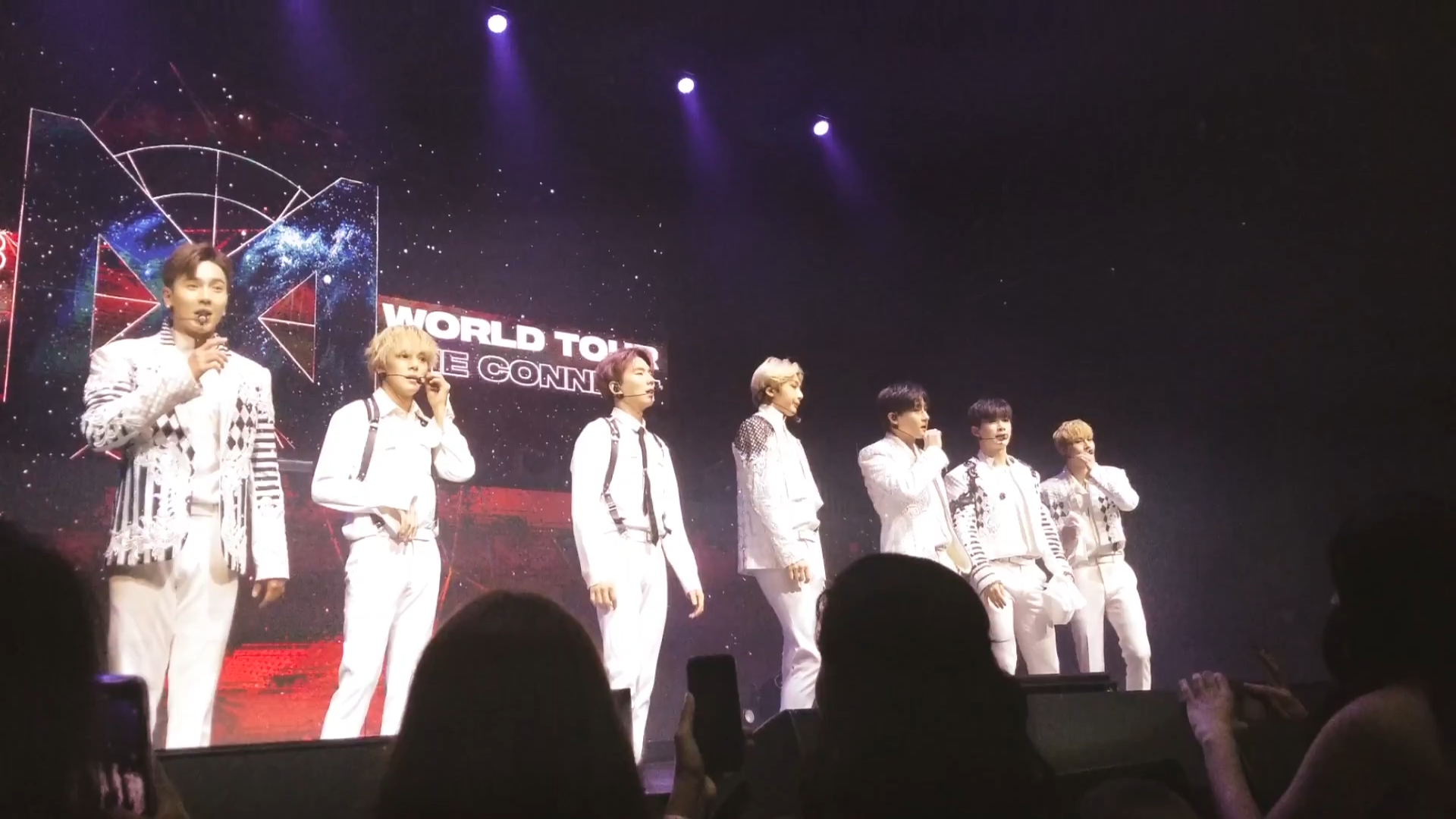
Monsta X at The Connect World Tour in 2018

On January 13, the group served as torchbearers for the Olympic torch relay in Seoul at the 2018 Pyeongchang Winter Olympics. On January 31, they released their third Japanese single, which included their first original Japanese track "Spotlight" and Japanese version of their previously released Korean track "Shine Forever", in which were previously performed for Monsta X Christmas Party 2017. From January 19 to February 18, Monsta X opened a collaboration cafe for a limited time at Shinjuku Box.

In February, the group announced their second world tour The Connect, with the first shows on May 26 and 27, held at Jangchung Arena in Seoul.

On March 26, they officially released their sixth EP The Connect: Dejavu, which contains seven tracks including the title track "Jealousy", produced by Hayden Bell, Shane Simmons, and Harry Sommerdahland, with the tracks "If Only", co-written by Wonho and "Special", co-written by Jooheon. In this comeback, Monsta X won another music broadcast award through SBS MTV's The Show.

On April 25, the group released their first Japanese studio album Piece with the lead title track "Puzzle", including the songs from their previous Japanese single albums and another four additional songs. Piece reached number one on Tower Records chart all store, number three on the weekly Oricon Albums Chart and Billboard Japan Hot Albums chart. On April 27, they started their first Japan tour in Nagoya.

On August 1, Monsta X released a music video for their Japanese comeback "Livin' It Up", while the single was officially released on September 12.

On October 22, the group released the first part of their second studio album Take.1 Are You There?, with the title track "Shoot Out". The English version of the song was released on November 9.

=== 2019: Take.2 We Are Here, international expansion and Wonho's departure ===
On January 20, they released the second part of their second studio album Take.2 We Are Here, along with its lead single "Alligator".

In February, Jooheon announced that he changed his stage name for English activities to Joohoney.

In March, Monsta X collaborated with music producer Steve Aoki for the track "Play It Cool" and its English version.

In April, their agency Starship Entertainment, announced their third world tour We Are Here, with twelve countries and eighteen cities, making it their largest to date.

On May 28, the group signed with Epic Records for their English language recordings and distribution outside South Korea. On June 14, they released a new English single titled "Who Do U Love?" featuring French Montana. On September 20, Monsta X released another English single titled "Love U" and "Who Do U Love?" remix version by will.i.am.

On October 4, the group released the English single "Someone's Someone", co-written by the Before You Exit members and Shownu. On October 28, they released their seventh EP Follow: Find You containing eight tracks, with the pre-released single "Find You" and the lead single "Follow". On October 31, Starship Entertainment announced that member Wonho would be departing, following recent allegations for drug use and owed money, and that the company intends to "hold legal liability" for "malicious and distorted claims" about him. The fans expressed their disapproval and requested of Starship Entertainment that he be reinstated in Monsta X. Wonho was then cleared of drug charges in March 2020 and was signed with a subsidiary of Starship Entertainment to pursue a solo career.

In December, the group released a digital single "Magnetic", a collaboration with the Colombian singer Sebastián Yatra, with him singing in Spanish and Monsta X singing in English and Spanish. They also performed at the MDL Beast Festival in Saudi Arabia, performing thirteen songs including "Play It Cool", alongside Steve Aoki.

=== 2020: All About Luv, virtual concerts and Fatal Love ===
On January 11, Joohoney announced that he would take a break from Monsta X to focus on his mental health.

On February 14, the group released their sixth studio album and first all-English album All About Luv. It debuted and peaked at number five on the US Billboard 200 and at number seven on the US Rolling Stone Top 200.

On March 30, they released their seventh Japanese single "Wish on the Same Sky", ahead of the physical release on April 15. Upon the release, it ranked number one on the weekly Tower Records chart and number seven on the weekly Billboard Japan Hot 100 chart. It also ranked number one overall for the first half of 2020 on the Tower Records chart.

In April, Monsta X appeared on MTV Unplugged at Home, performing "Beside U" and "You Can't Hold My Heart".

On May 26, the group released their eighth EP Fantasia X, with the lead single "Fantasia". Prior to this comeback, Joohoney had already rejoined promotions with them and thus, they were a six-member group for the promotion of "Fantasia".

Monsta X had announced their fourth world tour, but it was delayed due to COVID-19 pandemic. Unable to perform at in-person concerts, the group participated in a live-streamed KCON event Kcon:Tact 2020. They also announced that Monsta X would hold a live-streamed concert Live From Seoul With Luv, which was originally scheduled for July 25, but then rescheduled on August 8, to allow Shownu to recover from the unexpected surgery he had undergone. The group held their concert through the music streaming platform LiveXLive and performed several songs from their English-language album All About Luv, as well as from their most recent Korean EP Fantasia X and older title tracks.

On November 2, they released their third studio album Fatal Love, with the lead single "Love Killa". On November 21, Monsta X released a soundtrack "How We Do", for the animated movie The SpongeBob Movie: Sponge on the Run, alongside Snoop Dogg.

On December 16, the group released their eighth Japanese single, which included the Japanese versions of their title tracks "Love Killa" and "Fantasia".

=== 2021: Shownu's enlistment, The Dreaming and first film ===
In January, they were announced to be part of the artists featuring on NCSoft's new platform Universe, beginning with an original series called Area 51: The Code.

Monsta X released a new Japanese single on March 10, with the title track "Wanted" and another original Japanese track "Neo Universe". "Wanted" was pre-released ahead of the physical release on February 10, while the music video was released on February 13. Following the release of "Wanted", the group announced the release of their third Japanese studio album Flavors of Love, released on May 5, which includes their Japanese singles released since 2020, as well as five new Japanese tracks.

In May, they announced the release of their ninth EP One of a Kind, with the lead single "Gambler", set on June 1. Starship Entertainment also announced that Shownu will be on hiatus and will not participate in the upcoming promotional activities due to resurfacing issues of retinal detachment.

On June 15, their American managing partner Eshy Gazit announced the launch of a new label venture Intertwine, in partnership with BMG, with its first two artists being Monsta X and Wonho. The venture finalized a separate distribution deal, in partnership with Starship Entertainment, for their two upcoming Korean releases, as well as their second English-language album in 2021.

On July 22, Shownu enlisted for his mandatory military service and served as public service worker due to previous surgery for left eye retinal detachment. On July 26, the group released the promotional single "Kiss or Death" through Universe Music for the mobile application Universe.

In September, they announced their new English single "One Day", which was released on September 10.

On November 19, Monsta X released their tenth EP No Limit, with the lead single "Rush Hour". It was their first release to not feature Shownu since his enlistment.

On December 10, the group released their second English-language album The Dreaming, which includes their previously released single "One Day" and nine new tracks. They released a documentary film/concert film Monsta X: The Dreaming on December 8 in South Korea, and on December 9 and 11 in seventy countries worldwide. It contains interviews with the members, clips from their U.S. activities, special stages, and footage of the group's six-year journey.

=== 2022: U.S. tour and contract renewals ===
On March 23, Monsta X announced their eleventh EP Shape of Love, with the lead single "Love", to be released on April 11. However, the group members had tested positive for COVID-19, and as a result, their comeback was postponed until April 26.

Their U.S. tour, previously postponed due to the COVID-19 pandemic, was rescheduled for May and June with stops in nine cities. They also confirmed their appearance in the KCON event KCON 2022 Premiere.

On May 9, Starship Entertainment announced that members Shownu, Kihyun, and Hyungwon had already decided to renew their contracts, while members Minhyuk, Joohoney, and I.M had discussed renewing their contracts. On August 8, Starship Entertainment released a statement announcing that all the members renewed their contracts, except I.M. He decided not to renew his contract with the agency but will still continue to participate in Monsta X's future plans.

On July 7, the group released the promotional single "If with U" through Universe Music for the mobile application Universe. On July 21, they also released a new single titled "Late Night Feels" in collaboration with famous Dutch DJ Sam Feldt.

On August 12, Starship Entertainment announced that Monsta X will hold the No Limit Tour in Seoul for three days on September 2 to 4, continuing the heat of their U.S. tour.

On September 24, the group performed in the Lalapa K-Concert, held at Union Hall in Bangkok, Thailand.

On October 7, they participated in the 2022 Korean Culture Festival, held at Seoul Olympic Stadium in Seoul, South Korea. On October 22, Monsta X was supposed to headline Nickelodeon's NickFest: The Messiest Music Festival Ever, to be held at the Rose Bowl in Pasadena, California, but it was cancelled due to "current market conditions". The group was supposed to headline the new mega concert KAMP LA 2022, a joint production from KAMP Global with the partnership brand Eventim Live Asia, at the same location, on October 16, but their appearance, alongside several other artists, was cancelled due to "visa issues".

=== 2023: International performances, Shownu's discharge and members' enlistment ===
On January 9, they released their twelfth EP Reason, with the lead single "Beautiful Liar".

In February, all Starship Entertainment's artists, including Monsta X, will be part of the mobile application Dear U bubble after the closing of Universe. On February 10, the group took over the metaverse in iHeartLand's State Farm Park, performing their hit songs, where several other artists, including Charlie Puth, Lauv, and Pentatonix participated. They released their first "self-produced" content MONMUKGO through their YouTube channel, starting on February 28.

On March 3, Monsta X was featured in March issue of the magazine Children's Garden as "the leading figure in K-pop", with the theme of "voice". It will tackle their overall activities, including dancing and singing skills, as well as lyricist and composition skills, from the debut to the present.

On April 4, Minhyuk enlisted for his mandatory military service as an active duty soldier. On April 21, the group attended and performed in the We Bridge Music Festival & Expo, held at the Mandalay Bay Convention Center's Michelob Ultra Arena in Las Vegas, Nevada, as its headliner. On the same day, Shownu was discharged from his mandatory military service as a social worker.

On July 24, Joohoney enlisted for his mandatory military service as an active duty soldier.

On August 22, Kihyun enlisted for his mandatory military service as an active duty soldier.

On November 14, Hyungwon enlisted for his mandatory military service as an active duty soldier.

=== 2024: Focus on solo activities and Minhyuk's discharge ===
On January 1, it was announced that the remaining active members (Shownu and I.M) will focus on their individual activities.

On April 24, Starship Entertainment announced that they will have the "Monsta X: Welcome Party" pop-up store, on May 9–15, in commemoration of their 9th debut anniversary.

On October 3, Minhyuk was discharged from his mandatory military service as an active duty soldier.

=== 2025: Members' discharge and group activities ===
On January 22, it was revealed that the B-side track "Beastmode", from their third studio album Fatal Love, was used as an ending theme song for the South Korean animated film Exorcism Chronicles: The Beginning. On January 23, Joohoney was discharged from his mandatory military service as an active duty soldier.

On February 21, Kihyun was discharged from his mandatory military service as an active duty soldier.

On May 13, Hyungwon was discharged from his mandatory military service as an active duty soldier. On May 14, Monsta X released the compilation album Now Project Vol.1, composed of ten re-recorded tracks of all six members from 2021 to 2023 releases, in commemoration of their 10th debut anniversary. On May 15, it was announced that the group will have their 10th debut anniversary concert Connect X in Seoul on July 18–20, as well as in Japan on August 27–28. On May 22, it was announced that they will also have the "Monologue" pop-up store, on May 29 – June 11, in commemoration of their 10th debut anniversary.

On July 26, Monsta X performed at Waterbomb in Busan.

In August, the group performed at KCON 2025 in Los Angeles. On August 18, they pre-released their digital single "Do What I Want".

On September 2, Monsta X released their thirteenth EP The X, with the lead single "N the Front".

On November 14, the group released their English-language digital single "Baby Blue".

On December 3, they released a concert film Monsta X: Connect X in Cinema, in commemoration of their 10th debut anniversary. Monsta X performed at iHeartRadio's Jingle Ball Tour on December 12, 15–16, and 20, in New York, Philadelphia, Washington D.C., and Miami, respectively.

=== 2026: Fourth world tour, I.M's enlistment and Unfold ===
The group held their fourth world tour The X: Nexus, kicking off in Seoul for three days from January 30 to February 1, with its encore scheduled in November in Seoul. On February 6, they released their English digital single "Growing Pains". On February 9, I.M enlisted for his mandatory military service as an active duty soldier.

On April 3, Monsta X released their third English-language album Unfold, which includes their previously released singles "Baby Blue" and "Growing Pains".

On June 17, the group performed at K-Expo Inkigayo in Paris. On June 21, they headlined the Park Music Festival in Seoul. On June 26, Monsta X performed at K-Mega Concert in Sydney.

On August 15, the group performed at Istanbul Festival. On August 22, they performed at 2026 CassCool Festival in Gwacheon. On August 29, Monsta X performed at a send-off ceremony of South Korea's national MMA team for the 2026 Aichi-Nagoya Asian Games.

On September 4, the group released their fourteenth EP The Phase, with the lead single "Magic". On September 5, they attended the 22nd Jecheon International Music & Film Festival and performed at One Summer Night with K-pop Concert Season 2. On September 6, Monsta X performed at Seoul Madley Medley 2026. On September 26, the group released the compilation album Now Project Vol.2, composed of eight re-recorded title tracks of six members from 2015 to 2019 releases, in commemoration of their fan club's anniversary.

== Artistry ==
=== Musical style and influences ===
Monsta X is known for having a unique style, often described as intense or aggressive, combining the elements of hip hop, EDM, and pop. Philip Merrill described their sound for the Grammy's news publication as distinct in the K-pop scene with Monsta X "adding their Korean eclectic backgrounds to a meld between American rap, rock, and pop, they bring a throbbing rhythmic bounce, lyrics hard enough to slide in raps at will, melodies pop enough to hold you, all with a rock edge as the greater context". The group's aggressive style with "tracks centred around loud, clattering, electronic instrumentals, vicious rap verses and striking vocals" had been influential across the fourth generation of K-pop.

While the group is often known for their intense style, their albums frequently are "a mix between intense songs and softer ballads". Michael Cerio of Radio.com described their EP Follow: Find You as "a balance of ballads and bangers". Tamar Herman of Billboard described their first English-language studio album All About Luv as "a divergence from their boisterous dance-oriented album they typically release in the South Korean music market", focusing on "an overwhelming sense of sentimentality and smoothness", while it was also said to have proven that "K-pop transcends language barriers".

Early in their career, Monsta X cited Big Bang as the artist that influences and inspires them. The group also cited various international artists as their musical influences including Michael Jackson, Chris Brown, and Bruno Mars.

=== Concept and lyrical themes ===
Monsta X showed how diverse their concepts were, starting from their LGBT-themed concept for The Clan series, which is all about youth growth. L-ost depicts the loss and pain of youth, containing young people who live with pain in their hearts and having tragic ending through loss, G-uilty contains the story of protecting their innocence against the world that has caused them loss and pain, and B-eautiful portrays youth's rebellion, released in T-rilogy.

The group also showed how they expanded their worldview through the release of Take.1 Are You There?, as they explore the seven deadly sins concept. It was conceptualized as battle of "Light and Dark", "Good and Evil", "Life and Death", and everything on the border searching salvation. It continued through the release of Take.2 We Are Here, with the theme of finding hope in the midst of loss and wandering, while finding salvation in the process.

As they were inspired to go in a new direction to show the many sides of love, Monsta X released All About Luv, which explores the elements of relationships, dealing with breakups and deceit. The group came back with a villain-inspired concept, referencing different well-known characters from the movies such as Kingsman, American Psycho, The Silence of the Lambs, Fight Club, Joker, and Drive, with the release of Fatal Love, which experiments with the concept of temptation and exploring the darker side of romance, showing it as both cruel and beautiful. They also released The Dreaming, which explores the deep meaning of love, lust, and loss, dealing with heartbreak and revival.

The group's lyrics address the themes of love and empowerment in general.

=== Stage and aesthetics ===
Monsta X had been breaking gender norms before it was a trend. Taylor Glasby of GQ stated that their "smokey eye make-up, embellished jackets, chokers, and leather trousers, with bondage-style leather harnesses under double-breasted suits", made it "sensual, provocative, and divisive but Monsta X have developed a proud ownership of this duality". Natalie Morin described the group's armor for Refinery29 as "usually some mixture of blacks, golds, and reds, leather, and dramatic, smokey makeup, with an aura around them that mere mortals dare not disturb", accenting that the group "fit closely in many ways to what Koreans would describe as the "beast" idol aesthetic – dark, edgy, traditionally "masculine" presenting – as opposed to the softer, cute "flower boy" aesthetic also found among many male K-pop groups".

The group was also commended for using traditional Korean inspired elements during their performances, including hanbok-inspired outfits and the use of the taepyeongso. Their modernized take on the men's hanbok, "in black and gold prints flowing past their waists like a cape, with fitted pants of mostly gold designs, and the use of the Korean drums, was also highlighted". Kim Ri-eul, a hanbok designer who created hanbok fashion for Monsta X, also hope that "the beauty of traditional hanbok will become more widely known through the Korean wave".

== Public image and impact ==
When 20th and 21st century singers who have something in common were introduced, from music to stage costumes, concepts, and tones, a parallel theory of two singers, so-called "doppel singers" was made. The group was said to be the singer who continues the legend of the "Original Beast Idol" Shinhwa and has been called since then the "Next Generation Beast Idol".

Monsta X is also called the "Global K-pop Group", recognized as one of the artists that contributed and extended the Korean wave globally. In 2018, they performed for the yearly iHeartRadio's Jingle Ball Tour, making them the first Korean group to perform at iHeartRadio's annual event, as well as in 2019, and in 2021. The group was also rendered by Cartoon Network in an episode of the animated series We Bare Bears, making them the first-ever guest stars in an American animated series. They were personally invited by the South Korean President Moon Jae-in to perform for King Harald V of Norway for the 60th anniversary of diplomatic relations between Korea and Norway. Monsta X became the first K-pop artist to appear on a live broadcast of the morning news program Good Morning Britain of the British ITV channel. They were also the first Korean singers to appear and perform on the popular American show The Kelly Clarkson Show. They also appeared and performed at the Time 100 Talks where they also voiced support for the Black Lives Matter movement, as well as drawing attention to the work of medical professionals during the ongoing COVID-19 pandemic. Monsta X was also the first Korean artist to perform for iHeartRadio's metaverse concert through the metaverse-based games Fortnite and Roblox. The group was also named by the Korean media as "Korea's Representative Group" and "K-pop Emerging Power" because of their remarkable achievements abroad.

Known as the "K-pop Monster" for their exemplary stages and performances, Monsta X became the first Korean artist to appear and perform at the 2019 Teen Choice Awards. The group also proved their local popularity by having a sold-out concert at the Staples Center.

Even before Monsta X's official debut in 2015, they had been called as "blue chip" in the advertising industry, as various brands were already lined up to recruit them as models. Tony Moly also attributed its stock price rise to the group's explosive popularity among the overseas K-pop fans, especially in Thailand, the largest cosmetics market in ASEAN. Chairman Bae Hae-dong of Tony Moly had escaped deficit and turned a profit by establishing a foothold in overseas markets through Monsta X as company's key turning factor. In 2018, Maeil Business Newspaper cited that their tour alone had accumulated more than a third of Starship Entertainment's annual sales and growth of 35% since their debut. In 2019, an official statement from Kakao M revealed that Monsta X received 7,906 shares (about ₩1,000,000,000) of it to resolve issue rights to strengthen solidarity with affiliates and entertainers. They are one of many Kakao M-affiliated artists who received stocks from the company, of which, according to reports, is also preparing to rejoin Korea Exchange through a re-IPO. In 2020, Starship Entertainment's CEO Kim Shi-dae named them as the agency's "cash cows" and "flagship group", recording sales of ₩10,000,000,000.

In 2018, the famous and leading American music streaming service Pandora included the group on their "Artists to Watch 2019", with them being the only K-pop artist on its list. In 2022, the American online publication Teen Vogue included Monsta X on their "Best Boy Bands of All Time", citing them as "K-pop Icons", then consider them as one of the most popular K-pop groups (and most popular boy bands) around the world. In 2023, it also cited the group's "signature style", which influenced newer generations of artists through styling, performances, vibes, and music. In 2025, Director Maggie Kang of the American animated film KPop Demon Hunters named them as one of the inspirations behind the characters Saja Boys.

Monsta X's music had influenced various artists including Myteen, Verivery, DKZ, Newkidd, OnlyOneOf, DKB, Cravity, WEi, Ciipher, Trendz, TAN, and Idid, as well as A.C.E's Chan, Drippin's Junho, Kingdom's Dann and Mujin, and Xodiac's Wain. Olympic medalist boxer Im Ae-ji is a fan.

== Awards and achievements ==
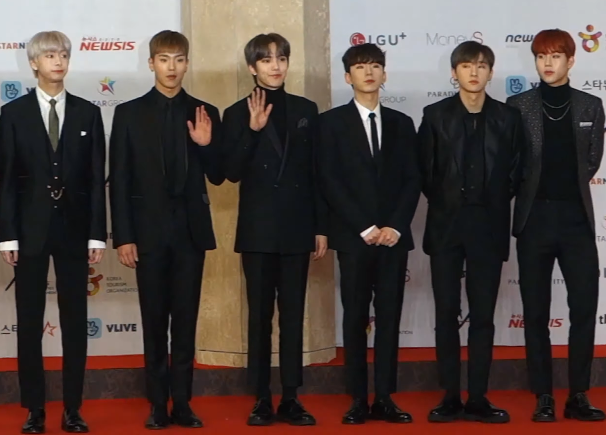
Monsta X at 2018 Asia Artist Awards

Monsta X had won numerous awards, both in South Korea and internationally. They earned their first-ever weekly music program win on The Show, with their single "Dramarama" on November 14, 2017, while their first-ever weekly public broadcast music program win on Music Bank, with their single "Shoot Out" on November 2, 2018. The group also reached a career high for number of music program wins, a total of five trophies, with their single "Rush Hour".

Monsta X won sixteen Bonsang (main prize) and one Daesang (grand prize) awards from various year-end award shows. They also won the "Represent Song of the Year" at the APAN Music Awards in 2020.

In 2019, Monsta X received a Minister of Culture, Sports and Tourism Commendation at the Korean Popular Culture and Arts Awards, in honor for their contribution to the development of South Korea's contemporary pop culture and arts.

Monsta X landed a spot on Billboard's Social 50 of the 2010s, which ranked the most active musical artists on the world's leading social networking services in a decade.

== Other ventures ==
=== Ambassadorship ===
In December 2015, Monsta X was appointed as the seventh promotional ambassadors for the Girl Scouts Korea, and will participate in various activities, such as various events and newsletters of the Korea Girl Scouts Federation.

In May 2017, the group had been appointed as the ambassadors for Gyeonggi Youth Phone 1388, a customized counseling service that allows anyone including teenagers, parents, and teachers, to consult on youth issues 24 hours a day, 365 days a year through the phone and the internet, will engage in the activities, such as shooting posters and appearing in videos to promote Youth Call 1388 for the next one year.

In May 2018, Monsta X attended the largest urban cultural festival C-Festival 2018 as its public relations ambassador for promotion, held by the Ministry of Foreign Affairs, Embassy of Thailand (Embassy of the Republic of Korea), Gangnam-gu, Korea International Trade Association, and COEX MICE Cluster Committee, hosted by COEX and WTC Seoul.

In September 2019, it was announced that they had partnered with TogetherBand to become ambassadors for the United Nations' Goal 16, in promoting just, peaceful, and inclusive societies, one of the 17 Sustainable Development Goals that address global challenges from poverty to inequality.

In September 2020, Monsta X was announced to be participating in the "Visit Cultural Heritage Campaign", a campaign to promote the traditional Korean culture through tours of the South Korea's UNESCO World Heritage Sites, through the joint program Korean Heritage Travelog on YouTube, in cooperation with Seo Kyung-duk, a famous Korean promoter who teaches at Sungshin Women's University. In December, the group was announced as the ambassadors for the 19th International Anti-Corruption Conference, which was hosted in Seoul, will be in charge of promoting through appearing in promotional posters and banner advertisements, as well as participating in the integrity campaign.

=== Endorsements ===
In March 2015, Monsta X had been selected as advertising models for the Korean casual brand Litmus before their official debut. On October 25, the group collaborated with the Korean online shopping store Melon Shopping to promote Monsta X's first MD product.

In August 2016, the group became advertising models for the Korean telecommunications company KT's rate plan Y-Teen by releasing various contents to appeal to teenagers as its main target.

In February 2017, they became the promotional models for the mobile maritime MMORPG Great Ocean. In August, the group filmed a F/W commercial for the Italian sportswear brand Kappa, representing street culture.

In March 2018, Monsta X was officially selected as the second model of Kakao Games through the mobile game play channel KakaoTalk Game Star. In April, they partnered with Lens Town, a fashion eyewear and contact lens company, to work as models. The group participated in the release process with Lens Town to produce their lens as "Monsta X Lens" or "MnX", while the members coordinated their designs and detail points. The lens were released officially in May. In May, Monsta X collaborated with Austrian producer of crystal glass and jewelry Swarovski for the group's world tour. On September 13, they did a collaboration event with the American headwear brand New Era and Japan-based electronic commerce and internet company DMM.com. On October 1, the group became the print advertising models for the Korean cosmetics brand Tony Moly's lip tint cosmetics line, as well as moisturizer and hand cream. On October 4, they partnered with the French-founded Italian luxury fashion design house Moncler, with the new flagship store of the company in Minato, Tokyo.

In February 2019, Monsta X had been selected as exclusive models for the school uniform brand Smart, starting with the release of the 2019 summer clothes pictorial through official website and SNS channels, as well as participating in various marketing and promotions of its school uniforms. On March 20, they signed another five-year renewal contract with the Korean casual brand Litmus as print advertising models. On April 23, Monsta X had been selected as advertising models for the Korean shopping mall brand Doota Duty Free and Doota Mall. On May 13, the group collaborated with the popular Japanese collectible designer toys brand Bearbrick. On September 8, they were selected as the Korean representatives for the global beverage brand Pepsi's new global campaign "For the Love of It".

In June 2020, NCSoft announced its collaboration with Monsta X through the creation of TwoTuckGom (투턱곰), bears designed to represent each member of the group and NCSoft released goods themed around the bears, including stationary and plushes, along with series of variety shows for the promotion of the goods.

In January 2021, Monsta X had been announced as global brand ambassadors for the American cosmetics brand Urban Decay, with the promotions starting in February.

In May 2022, the group collaborated with the Japanese luxury vehicle brand Lexus for their tour, releasing exclusive photocards that can only be obtained by owning the vehicle.

Starting in August 2023, Monsta X received several product placement through their own reality/variety show including Luna Fall in Jeju Island and Lotte Chilsung Beverage's Chum Churum Saero soju.

In May 2024, the group released Monmungchi X, members' official characters that closely resemble their appearance characteristics. In October, they collaborated with SPAO to release Monmungchi X's winter collection.

In August 2025, Monsta X collaborated with the American athletic shoe brand K-Swiss, promoting its products under the theme "Better Together".

In June 2026, the group collaborated with the Korea Tourism Organization as part of its new inbound tourism campaign "BIAS (Be In Artists' Scenes)", to promote famous landmarks and experiential products in South Korea.

=== Philanthropy ===
In November 2018, Monsta X participated in the Love It, Live It Pepsi Concert, a joint donation concert by the Lotte Chilsung Beverage, Pepsi Korea, and Green Umbrella Children's Foundation, in contributing to meaningful cultural sharing, by directly inviting children from low-income families and providing opportunities to watch performances, leading children's healthy performance and cultural life.

In September 2019, the group, together with Doota Mall, opened a charity pop-up store to commemorate the renewal opening for the first time in five years, while the charity auction will be held during the event period, along with sixteen kinds of costumes that the members actually wore while filming the commercials, and the proceeds from this sale will also be donated under the names of Monsta X and Doota.

In March 2020, Monsta X donated ₩100,000,000 to the Good Neighbors, a charity organization that is helping the low-income families in South Korea, and then were later included in "The Neighbors Club" for their contributions, listing themselves, alongside their fanbase, Monbebe. On March 27, the group participated with the fundraising broadcast for the COVID-19 response, hosted by the American video livestreaming service Twitch's Stream Aid 2020, where the game, music, and sports industries around the world had gathered to support the World Health Organization's "COVID-19 Solidarity Response Fund", a United Nations specialized agency. On April 6, they joined the Sports Doctors' "Relay Support Campaign", an international health care organization that encourages medical staff and citizens in Korea, as well as around the world who are struggling with COVID-19. It is also a campaign that supports participation in social media and donations at the same time. On May 25, they held a successful participatory donation performance, for the global short video application TikTok's Stage Live From Seoul concert with the accumulated donation is TikTok's "Fruit of Love Social Welfare Community Chest" for the socially vulnerable class affected by COVID-19. On August 31, the group participated and won on the KBS 2TV's show Idol on Quiz with the prize money donated as a learning support fund for students learning Korean language and culture.

In August 2021, Monsta X participated in the 2020 Tokyo Paralympic Games support K-pop online concert We All Are One to cheer for all 4,400 athletes from 181 countries through Red Angel's own streaming service Cushion Live, wherein the proceeds are circulated through The Salvation Army to global donation projects.

In July 2022, Starship Entertainment, together with the group, participated in The Blue Tree Foundation's campaign, to declare support for non-violence, along with this label's other artists. This is established to prevent school and cyberbullying, and to heal the victims, is conducting a "national non-violence campaign" in which the citizens can also participate to publicize the seriousness of violence and to spread a culture of non-violence. On July 28, Monsta X joined the "Anniversary of Love" campaign, as well as donated on the Save the Children's "Fan Club Anniversary" event to support meals for children, relieve abused children, and protect children's right to education through the group's fanbase.

In January 2024, they donated ₩2,600,000 worth of coal briquettes to the Coal Briquettes for Neighbors in Korea through the group's fanbase for the second time, delivering 2,400 briquettes, 200 each to 12 households. As a result, Monbebe became the only idol fanbase volunteers whose names were listed in "2022 Volunteer Sponsorship Newsletter".

In March 2025, Monsta X donated ₩100,000,000 to the Good Neighbors due to the wildfires, which will be used to provide emergency relief items for families in the affected areas, including providing psychological treatment and counseling for children suffering psychological difficulties due to the disaster. On August 30, they collaborated with the women's fashion magazine Harper's Bazaar Korea, donating the magazines' sales proceeds under the group's fanbase, in commemoration of their 10th debut anniversary. In November, Monsta X donated to the Good Neighbors, which will be used for a meal support project that provides meal kits, side dishes, and groceries to children at risk of going hungry during the school break, under the group's fanbase, in commemoration of their 10th debut anniversary.

== Members ==
=== Current ===
- Shownu (셔누) – leader, vocalist
- Minhyuk (민혁) – vocalist
- Kihyun (기현) – vocalist
- Hyungwon (형원) – vocalist
- Joohoney (주헌) – rapper
- I.M (아이엠) – rapper

=== Former ===
- Wonho (원호) – vocalist (2015–2019)

== Sub-units ==
=== Shownu X Hyungwon ===
Shownu and Hyungwon formed Monsta X's first official sub-unit Shownu X Hyungwon and debuted on July 25, 2023. The duo released their debut EP The Unseen, with the lead single "Love Me a Little". Hyungwon produced "Love Me a Little" and the B-side track "Roll with Me", while Shownu participated in the choreography. They released their second EP Love Me on May 21, 2026. Hyungwon also produced the three tracks; "Superstitious", "In My Head", and "Accelerator", while Shownu participated in the overall choreography of the lead single "Do You Love Me".

== Discography ==
Korean albums

- The Clan Pt. 2.5: The Final Chapter (2017)
- Take.1 Are You There? (2018)
- Take.2 We Are Here (2019)
- Fatal Love (2020)

Japanese albums

- Piece (2018)
- Phenomenon (2019)
- Flavors of Love (2021)

English albums

- All About Luv (2020)
- The Dreaming (2021)
- Unfold (2026)

== Filmography ==
=== Animation ===
Year	Series	Role	Ref.
2019	We Bare Bears	Themselves	

=== Dramas ===
Year	Series	Role	Ref.
2015	The Producers	Themselves	
2015	High-End Crush	Themselves	
2016	Good Evening, Teacher	Themselves	
2017	Hit the Top	Themselves	

=== Film ===
Year	Title	Role	Note	Ref.
2021	Monsta X: The Dreaming	Themselves	Documentary/Concert Film	
2025	Monsta X: Connect X in Cinema	Themselves	Concert Film	

=== Reality/Variety shows ===
Year	Show	Ref.
2014–2015	No.Mercy	
2014–2015	Deokspatch	
2015	Deokspatch X	
2015	Deokspatch X²	
2016	Right Now!	
2017	No Exit Broadcast	
2017	Monsta X-Ray	
2017	Monsta X-Ray 2	
2018	Monsta X-Ray 3	
2018	When You Call My Name (with Gallant)	
2019	Monsta X's Puppy Day	
2020	Monsta X's TWOTUCKBEBE Day	
2020	Monsta X's Glamping with TTG	
2020	Monsta X's on Vacation	
2020	Monsta X's Newtroland	
2021	Area 51: The Code	
2021	Let's Go	
2021	MX Review	
2021	Speak Out, Monsta X!	
2021	SSAP-DANCE	
2021	Folktale Chaos	
2022	Cold Sleep: Kiss or Death	
2023–present	MONMUKGO	

== Tours and concerts ==
=== Asian tours ===
- The First Live "X-Clan Origins" (2016–2017)

=== World tours ===
- Beautiful World Tour (2017)
- The Connect World Tour (2018)
- We Are Here World Tour (2019)
- The X: Nexus World Tour (2026)

=== Other tours ===
- No Limit Tour (2022)

=== Virtual concerts ===
- Live From Seoul With Luv (2020)

== See also ==
- List of K-pop on the Billboard charts
