= You Can't Hold My Heart =

Single by Monsta X

from the album All About Luv
- Language: English
- Released: February 14, 2020
- Recorded: 2020
- Genre: Pop R&B
- Length: 3:28
- Label: Epic
- Composers: Anthony M. Jones; Jeffrey Gitelman; Jonathan Bellion; Steven Franks; Tommy Brown
- Producers: Gitty; Mr. Franks; Tommy Brown; Tone

Monsta X singles chronology
"Beside U" (2020)	"You Can't Hold My Heart" (2020)	"Fantasia" (2020)

Music video
- "You Can't Hold My Heart" on YouTube

"You Can't Hold My Heart" is a song recorded by the South Korean boy group Monsta X. It was released on February 14, 2020 from their first English-language album All About Luv. It debuted and peaked at number 40 on the US Billboard Mainstream Top 40 Airplay, becomes Monsta X's second single to be on the said chart.

== Background and release ==
The single was released on February 14, 2020, as part of Monsta X's album All About Luv. The music video was later released on April 17, 2020.

== Music video ==
The music video takes place in a bright red cube, while the members were seen walking on the ceiling and floating upside down, along with chests that emit clouds of smoke, which were color-coordinated with their outfits.

== Critical reception ==
Syd Briscoe of David Reviews gave both the song and its music video as the minimalist film focuses on depicting each members in a mysterious red world as they float through the air or walk on the ceiling, and that the chilled-out sound and English lyrics are sure to entice more fans to the group, as well as the group's good looks and distinctive styles are placed front and center.

== Charts ==
Chart (2020)	Peak position
US Mainstream Top 40 (Billboard)	40

== See also ==
- List of K-pop songs on the Billboard charts
