= Tony Moly =

South Korean cosmetics brand

TONYMOLY 토니모리
- Founded: 2006
- Headquarters: Seoul, South Korea
- Area served: Worldwide
- Products: Skincare
- Website: corp.tonymoly.com

Tony Moly (Korean: 토니모리) is a South Korean cosmetics brand.

Tony Moly was established in 2006 with the support of Tae Sung Industry. The name Tony Moly means "putting style into packaging".

== History ==
- In July 2006, Tony Moly Cosmetics was launched with the support of Tae Sung Industry.
- In April 2008, Soo Hwan Kang was appointed as the new president and 60 stores in Korea were opened.
- In 2009, Tony Moly opened stores in Japan, Taiwan, Hong Kong, China, Vietnam and Myanmar. By November, it had over 120 stores in Korea.
- In 2010, Kim Huonh Cheon was appointed as the new CEO and Tony Moly opened its 200th shop.
- In 2011, Tony Moly opened its 300th shop and in April, Tony Moly opened its first store in the Philippines.
- In August 2013, Tony Moly launched in Russia, opening two stores in Rostov-na-Donu and Ulan-Ude.
- In 2013, Tony Moly opened its 10th single shop in Indonesia.
- In 2015, Tony Moly opened a flagship store in New York on July 13. The same year, Tony Moly opened its official store in the Latin American country Colombia. It first began in the cities of Bogota and Medellin.
- In 2016, Tony Moly achieved a total of 825 stores launched in 15 countries.

== Spokespersons and models ==
- Kim Hyun-joong was Tony Moly's endorser for 3 years from 2007 to 2010. On 17 August 2010, Brown Eyed Girls became their new models, along with actor Song Joong-ki.
- On 7 July 2011, T-ara became endorsers of Tony Moly.
- On 17 September 2012, JYJ was chosen as endorsers of Tony Moly.
- On 3 September 2013, Super Junior-M and f(x)'s Victoria were chosen as the new models of Tony Moly.
- On 2 September 2014, Hyuna and B1A4 become Tony Moly's new models.
- On 29 March 2018, BtoB become Tony Moly's new male model.
- On 1 October 2018, amid heavy speculation within the Korean makeup industry, Monsta X became advertising models for its newest lip tint line with a guaranteed contract clause of 24 months.
- On 22 February 2019, it was reported that the group's explosive popularity among overseas K-pop fans made Tony Moly's stock price rise, especially in Thailand, the largest cosmetics market in ASEAN.
- in 2019, Kwon Nara
- in 2020, Kim Sa-rang, Kim Yo-han, Jessi (musician)
- in 2022, Shin Jee-won
- in 2024, Chung Ha
