= The Connect World Tour =

2018 concert tour by Monsta X

Monsta X World Tour: The Connect
- World tour by Monsta X
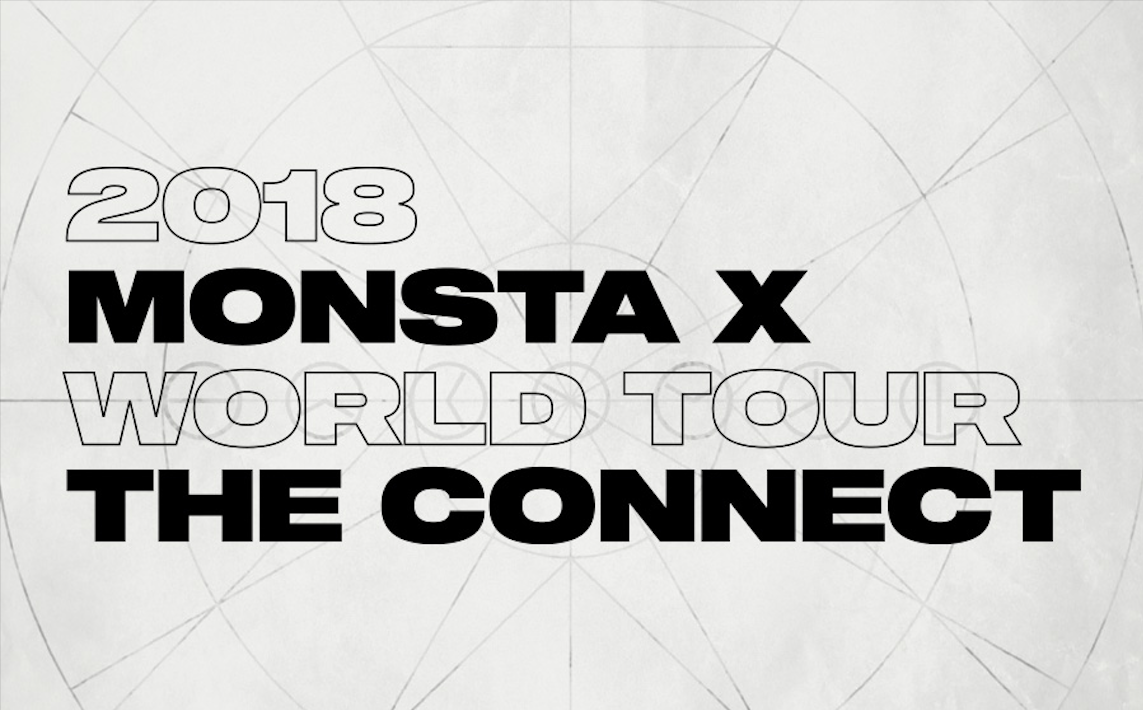
- Location: Asia; Europe; North America; South America
- Associated album: The Connect: Dejavu
- Start date: May 26, 2018
- End date: October 10, 2018
- Legs: 4
- No. of shows: 7 in Asia; 3 in Europe; 8 in North America; 3 in South America; 21 in Total

Monsta X concert chronology
- Monsta X World Tour: Beautiful (2017); Monsta X World Tour: The Connect (2018); Monsta X World Tour: We Are Here (2019)

The Connect World Tour, also known as Monsta X World Tour: The Connect, is the second worldwide concert tour by the South Korean boy group Monsta X following their successful and sold out world tour for the previous year Beautiful World Tour. The tour commenced on May 26, exactly two months after the release of the group's sixth EP The Connect: Dejavu, kicking off in Seoul, and visiting twelve more countries including United Kingdom, Netherlands, Spain, Thailand, Hong Kong, Taiwan, United States, Mexico, Argentina, Chile, Brazil, and Japan.

== Background ==
=== Asia ===
On February 22, their second world tour was announced, including eighteen cities, having their first show held in Seoul at Jangchung Arena on May 26 and 27. On April 13, Starship Entertainment revealed that the tickets for the two days Seoul concert had sold out within a minute upon the release on April 12 for three consecutive years.

For the tour, Monsta X collaborated with Swarovski for their customized jackets. The total number of Swarovski crystals used for their jackets amounted to 500,000 for eleven outfits that were created by hand for the group.

Before their concert on June 30 in Bangkok, they promoted their EP and concert in several local TV shows and held a press conference. The press conference was held on April 29 at the GCP Hall of the Grande Centre Point Hotel in Sukhumvit 55 and more than 100 reporters from local TV channels, radios, and major newspapers covered the event, including Thai media channels such as Daily News, True Music, Tofupop Radio, and True Inside that had separate interviews with Monsta X. In addition, the TV channels such as Channel 3, Channel 7, and Channel 9, while newspapers such as Daily News, Kom Chad Luek, Kapook, Sanook, and Mthai joined the conference. On the same day, Monsta X also appeared through the program Rueng Lao Chao Nee of Thailand's national television channel, Channel 3.

On August 25 and 26, Monsta X completed their two days encore concert held at SK Olympic Handball Gymnasium in Seoul where they were greeted by over 10,000 fans.

The group was initially scheduled for eighteen cities and twelve countries for the tour but Japan was added for a four-day concert starting from October 5 to October 7 in Chiba and October 10 in Osaka.

=== Europe ===
In May, after Monsta X began their tour in Seoul, they headed to Europe. The group were in London on June 17, in Amsterdam on June 20, and in Madrid on June 23. Their tour in Europe gathered over 15,000 fans who came all over the continent to see the boys.

In Europe, the concert brought the group media attention, including coverage by UK’s daily newspapers The Guardian and Metro.

=== Americas ===
Monsta X held the tour around the United States of America, which started on July 20 at Rosemont Theatre in Chicago then ended on August 3 at Microsoft Theater in Los Angeles. During their stay, they had sold out shows and interviews, with local and nationwide TV programs such as BUILD Series, FOX5's Good Day New York, Access Hollywood, and FOX 11's Good Day L.A., popular magazines such as Billboard and Allure, also internet and radio shows such as BuzzFeed, 102.3 KIIS-FM's Jojo on the Radio, 104.3 MYFM’s Valentine in the Morning, Radio Disney, Wild 94.9, Rhythm 105.9, iHeartRadio's ON With Mario Lopez, and Q 106.1's The Zach Sang Show. It ended on August 5 in Mexico.

The group was able to film for the Viki Original mini music documentary When You Call My Name featuring Gallant during the tour in North America.

After the North American leg, the group went to South America, beginning on August 8 in Argentina, followed by August 10 in Chile, and end it on August 12 in Brazil.

== Critical reception ==
Caroline Sullivan of The Guardian gave them and praised Monsta X's performance in London, noting that they are "a group that is skilled in singing, rapping, and dancing among various musical genres".

Sarah Deen of Metro gave them and described Monsta X's performance as "spectacular", giving their all in performing and very dedicated to their fans, also commending the group's "uniqueness", calling them "chameleons" for being "convincing and unforced when trying out different concepts", owning every one.

== Commercial performance ==
The tour gathered an estimated total of 102,493 attendees (excluding Japan), which accumulated an estimated total revenue of ₩11,270,000,000.

== Setlist ==
INTRO VCR

1. "Jealousy"
2. "Be Quiet"
3. "Beautiful"

MENT

4. "Gravity"
5. "Tropical Night"

MENT

6. "Blind"^{[a]}
7. "Crazy In Love"
8. "All In"

VCR

9. "I Do Love U" – Kihyun, Minhyuk, and Wonho
10. "Versace on the Floor" – Shownu and Jooheon
11. "How Long" – Hyungwon
12. "Impossible" – I.M
13. "Baby Shark"^{[a]} – Hyungwon and I.M
14. "Fake Love"^{[b]} – Hyungwon and I.M
15. "In Time"^{[a]}

MENT

16. "From Zero"
17. "Because of U"

MENT

18. "White Love"
19. "Roller Coaster"

VCR

20. "Lost In The Dream"
21. "Blue Moon"^{[a]}

MENT

22. "Destroyer"
23. "Shine Forever"

MENT

24. "Rush"
25. "Special"
26. "Trespass" (Rock ver.)

MENT

27. "Dramarama"

ENCORE

28. "Fallin'"

ENDING MENT

29. "If Only"^{[a]}

Notes:

- ^{^[a]} included in the Seoul setlist only
- ^{^[b]} included in the International setlist only
- Japan had a different setlist which included Japanese songs

== Tour dates ==
List of concerts, showing date, city, country, venue and attendance
Date	City	Country	Venue	Attendance
Asia
May 26, 2018	Seoul	South Korea	Jangchung Arena	7,000
May 27, 2018	Seoul	South Korea	Jangchung Arena	7,000
Europe
June 17, 2018	London	United Kingdom	Eventim Apollo	15,000
June 20, 2018	Amsterdam	Netherlands	AFAS Live	15,000
June 23, 2018	Madrid	Spain	Palacio Vistalegre	15,000
Asia
June 30, 2018	Bangkok	Thailand	Thunder Dome	Undisclosed
July 10, 2018	Hong Kong	China	KITEC Star Hall	Undisclosed
July 14, 2018	Taipei	Taiwan	Taipei Tennis Center	Undisclosed
North America
July 20, 2018	Chicago	United States	Rosemont Theatre	Undisclosed
July 22, 2018	Newark	United States	New Jersey Performing Arts Center	Undisclosed
July 25, 2018	Atlanta	United States	Cobb Energy Performing Arts Centre	Undisclosed
July 27, 2018	Dallas	United States	Verizon Theater	Undisclosed
July 29, 2018	Houston	United States	Smart Financial Centre	Undisclosed
August 1, 2018	San Francisco	United States	Warfield Theatre	Undisclosed
August 3, 2018	Los Angeles	United States	Microsoft Theater	Undisclosed
August 5, 2018	Monterrey	Mexico	Auditorio Pabellón M	Undisclosed
South America
August 8, 2018	Buenos Aires	Argentina	Estadio Obras	Undisclosed
August 10, 2018	Santiago	Chile	Polideportivo Estadio Nacional	Undisclosed
August 12, 2018	São Paulo	Brazil	Espaço Das Américas	Undisclosed
Asia
August 25, 2018	Seoul	South Korea	SK Olympic Handball Gymnasium	10,000
August 26, 2018	Seoul	South Korea	SK Olympic Handball Gymnasium	10,000
October 5, 2018	Chiba	Japan	Makuhari Event Hall	30,000
October 6, 2018	Chiba	Japan	Makuhari Event Hall	30,000
October 7, 2018	Chiba	Japan	Makuhari Event Hall	30,000
October 10, 2018	Osaka	Japan	Osaka-jō Hall	30,000

=== Boxscore ===
Venue	City	Tickets sold / Available	Gross revenue
Eventim Apollo	London, England	4,348 / 4,465	$486,814
