= The X: Nexus World Tour =

2026 tour by Monsta X

- World tour by Monsta X
- Location: Asia; Latin America
- Start date: January 30, 2026
- End date: June 11, 2026
- Legs: 2
- No. of shows: 13 in Asia; 4 in Latin America; 27 in Total
- Attendance: 140,866
- Box office: $19,274,000

Monsta X concert chronology
- No Limit Tour (2022); The X: Nexus World Tour (2026)

The X: Nexus World Tour is the fourth concert tour led by the South Korean boy group Monsta X. The tour was officially announced on November 27, 2025, and will begin on January 30, 31, and February 1, 2026, in South Korea. The tour is scheduled to conclude on June 11, 2026, in Chile.

== Background ==
On November 27, Kakao Entertainment announced a tour for Monsta X fans. The tour will begin at KSPO Dome in Seoul, South Korea and then proceed to countries in Asia and Latin America.

== Set list ==
1. "Dramarama"
2. "Love Killa"
3. "Rush Hour"
4. "Lone Ranger"
5. "Catch Me Now"
6. "Middle of the Night"
7. "Deny"
8. "And"
9. "Do What I Want"
10. "N the Front"
11. "Tuscan Leather"
12. "Beautiful"
13. "Nobody Else"
14. "Around and Go" (Shownu solo)
15. "Howling" (Kihyun solo)
16. "No Air" (Hyungwon solo)
17. "Reaching" (Minhyuk solo)
18. "Error 404" (I.M solom)
19. "Sting" (Joohoney solo)
20. "Touch the Sky" (Joohoney solo)
21. "Autobahn"
22. "Burning Up"
23. "Beautiful Liar"
24. "Alligator"
25. "Shoot Out"

Encore

1. "Oh My"
2. "Rodeo"
3. "Zone"
4. "Fallin'"
5. "Spotlight"

Encore 2

1. "Stand Up"
2. "Fire & Ice"

== Tour dates ==
List of concerts, showing date, city, country, venue, attendance, and gross revenue
Date	City	Country	Venue	Attendance	Revenue
January 30, 2026	Seoul	South Korea	KSPO Dome	45,000	—
January 31, 2026	Seoul	South Korea	KSPO Dome	45,000	—
February 1, 2026	Seoul	South Korea	KSPO Dome	45,000	—
March 7, 2026	Bangkok	Thailand	Thunder Dome	3500	—
March 14, 2026	Hong Kong	China	AsiaWorld-Expo Runway 11	3800	—
March 28, 2026	Kuala Lumpur	Malaysia	Mega Star Arena	5000	—
April 4, 2026	Taipei	Taiwan	New Taipei City Exhibition Hall	7000	—
April 18, 2026	Jakarta	Indonesia	The Kasablanka Hall	5500	—
April 25, 2026	Macau	China	Studio City Event Center	5000	—
April 28, 2026	Chiba	Japan	Lala Arena Tokyo-Bay	20,000	—
April 29, 2026	Chiba	Japan	Lala Arena Tokyo-Bay	20,000	—
May 3, 2026	Osaka		Ookini Arena Maishima	14,000	—
May 4, 2026	Osaka		Ookini Arena Maishima	14,000	—
June 4, 2026	Mexico City	Mexico	Auditorio Nacional	9366	—
June 6, 2026	Monterrey		Escenario GNP Seguros	4200	—
June 9, 2026	São Paulo	Brazil	Espaco Unimed	8000	—
June 11, 2026	Santiago	Chile	Movistar Arena	15,500	—
Total				140,866	US$19m
