= Ticketlink Live Arena =

Sporting arena in Seoul, South Korea

- Ticketlink Live Arena in 2020
- Interactive map of Ticketlink Live Arena
- Former names: Olympic Gymnasium No. 2 / Olympic Fencing Gymnasium (1986-2011); SK Olympic Handball Gymnasium (2011-2021); Olympic Handball Gymnasium (2022-2025)
- Location: 424 Olympic Road, Bangi-dong, Songpa District, Seoul, South Korea
- Coordinates: 37.517345°N 127.126313°E
- Capacity: 6,500

Construction
- Groundbreaking: September 1984
- Opened: April 1986
- Renovated: 2011
- Cost: 43.4 billion won (2011 reconstruction)
- Architect: Kang Kum-hee Architects
- Structural engineer: Geiger Associates

- Korean name
- Hangul: 올림픽핸드볼경기장
- Hanja: 올림픽핸드볼競技場
- Revised Romanization: Ollimpik handeubol gyeonggijang
- McCune–Reischauer: Ollimp'ik haendŭbol kyŏnggijang

Olympic Handball Gymnasium (Korean: 올림픽핸드볼경기장), currently known as Ticketlink Live Arena (Korean: 티켓링크 라이브 아레나) for sponsorship reasons, is an indoor sporting arena located at the Olympic Park in Bangi-dong, Songpa District, Seoul, South Korea. The arena was built from September 1984 to April 1986.

== History ==
Gymnasium in 2008

It was known as the Olympic Fencing Gymnasium (올림픽펜싱경기장; 올림픽펜싱競技場) or Olympic Gymnasium No. 2 prior to 2011. The arena hosted the fencing part of the modern pentathlon events at the 1988 Summer Olympics. In 2011 it was remodelled for handball games at a cost of ₩43.4 billion, specialized with handball only courts. It was renamed as such to host the SK Handball Korea League.

== Notable events ==
Besides holding fencing at the 1988 Olympics, the arena also hosts concerts by Korean as well as international artists.

- Megadeth
- Scorpions
- Unbreakable Tour (Backstreet Boys Tour)
- It was one of the venues for Avril Lavigne's Bonez Tour on March 23, 2005

=== 2007 ===
- Paris by Night 89: In Korea – July 1, 2007

=== 2008–2009 ===
- SS501: SS501 Showcase with Triple S – November 15, 2008
- Super Junior: 1st Asia Tour – "Super Show" – February 22, 23 and 24, 2008 and 3, January 4, 2009 (encore shows)
- Wonder Girls: The 1st Wonder Concert – March 28, 2009
- Super Junior – 2nd Asia Tour – "Super Show 2" – July 17, 18 and 19, 2009
- Park Hyo-shin: Park Hyo-shin's Gift – October 17, 18 and 19, 2009 – to celebrate the 10th anniversary of his debut.
- Girls' Generation: 1st Asia Tour – "Into the New World" – December 19, 20, 2009, and February 27, 28, 2010 (encore shows)

=== 2010–2012 ===
- 19th Seoul Music Awards – February 3, 2010
- Tom Jones: Tom Jones in Seoul – March 2010 (two shows) – first concerts in Korea in 27 years.
- B1A4: 1st BABA B1A4 Concert – December 8 and 9, 2012 – The first solo concert
- CN Blue: 2012 CN Blue Live: Blue Night in Seoul – December 15 and 16 – fourth concert in Seoul

=== 2013 ===
- 22nd Seoul Music Awards – January 31, 2013

=== 2014 ===
- B1A4: 2014 B1A4 Concert The Class – February 15 and 16, 2014
- 2NE1: All or Nothing World Tour – March 1 and 2 – sixth and seventh concert in Seoul as part of their second world tour
- B.A.P: B.A.P Live on Earth 2014 Continent Tour – March 8 and 9 – first and second stop in Seoul as a part of their second world tour
- Block B: Blockbuster Remastering – November 22 and 23, 2014

=== 2015 ===
- BTS: The Most Beautiful Moment in Life On Stage Tour – November 27, 28 and 29

=== 2016 ===
- Seventeen: 'LIKE SEVENTEEN – Boys Wish' ENCORE CONCERT – February 13 and 14
- B.A.P: B.A.P Live on Earth 2016 World Tour – February 20 and 21 – first and second stop in Seoul as a part of their third world tour
- GOT7: Fly Tour – April 29 and 30
- IU: 24 Steps: One, Two, Three, Four – December 3 and 4

=== 2017 ===
- BtoB: 3rd Concert 'BTOB Time' – January 21 and 22
- AOMG Follow The Movement concert – February 11 and 12
- Twice: Twice 1st Tour: Twiceland The Opening – February 17, 18 and 19
- 2PM: Concert '6 Nights' – February 24, 25 and 26
- Sechs Kies: YellowKies Day – July 15
- Kim Jong-hyun: INSPIRED – December 9 and 10

=== 2018 ===
- Apink: 4th Concert 'Pink Space' – January 12 and 13
- One Ok Rock: Ambitions Asiatour – February 2
- NU'EST W: 1st Concert 'Double You' – March 16, 17 and 18
- Shinhwa: Shinhwa Twenty Fanparty 'All Your Dreams' – March 24 and 25
- Red Velvet: 2nd Concert 'Redmare' – August 4 and 5
- Mamamoo: 2018 Mamamoo Concert 4 Seasons S/S – August 18 and 19
- Monsta X: The Connect World Tour in Seoul (Encore) – August 25 and 26
- Chvrches: Love is Dead Tour - August 27
- GFriend: 1st Concert 'Season Of GFriend' : Encore – September 8 and 9
- Shinhwa: Heart Tour in Seoul – October 6 and 7

=== 2019 ===
- Apink: 5th Concert 'Pink Collection' – January 5 and 6
- Lee Tae-min: T1001101 – 15, 16, and March 17
- Day6: 1st World Tour 'Youth' [Encore] – March 30 and 31
- Park Ji-hoon: Fancon 1st Asia Tour – December 21 and 22

=== 2020 ===
- Taeyeon: The UNSEEN – January 17, 18 and 19

=== 2021 ===
- The Boyz: THE BOYZ FAN CON : THE B-ZONE – December 3, 4 and 5
- Woodz: THE INVICIBLE CITY – December 11 and 12

=== 2022 ===
- GOT7: 2022 Fancon Homecoming with IGOT7 – May 21 and 22
- Universe: UNI-KON – July 2 and 3
- Aespa: 2022 aespa Fan Meeting: MY SYNK. aespa – July 30
- Itzy: Checkmate World Tour – August 6 and 7
- Lee Jun-ho: 2022 Fan-Con <Before Midnight> – August 12, 13 and 14
- Monsta X: 2022 No Limit Tour in Seoul – September 2, 3 and 4
- Enhypen: 2022 Manifesto World Tour – September 17 and 18
- Kep1er: 2022 Kep1er Fanmeeting <Kep1anet> – October 10
- Loona: Loonatheworld Tour – October 15 and 16

=== 2023 ===
- DKZ: 2023 Fancon Welcome to DTU – January 14 and 15
- (G)I-dle: Neverland 3rd Fan Meeting: DEAR. NƎVƎRLAND – January 28 and 29
- BTOB: Melody 5th Fan Meeting: MELODY COMPANY SEMINAR – March 18 and 19
- Mamamoo:My Con World Tour – June 16, 17, and 18
- NewJeans: NewJeans 1st Fanmeeting 'Bunnies Camp' – July 1 and 2
- Itzy: Kill My Doubt Showcase – July 31
- Tempest: 2023 TEMPEST Show Con [T-OUR] – August 12 and 13
- Woodz: 2023 WOODZ World Tour OO-LI AND in Seoul – October 28 and 29

=== 2024 ===
- Cha Eun-woo: Just One 10 Minute [Mystery Elevator] Tour – February 17
- Radwimps: WORLD TOUR 2024 "The way you yawn, and the outcry of Peace" – May 25 and 26
- Lay: 2024 WORLD TOUR GRANDLINE 4 : STEP IN SEOUL – June 22 and 23
- Red Velvet: 2024 Red Velvet Fan Concert 'Happiness: My Dear, ReVe1uv' – August 2, 3 and 4
- Super Junior-D&E: ECLIPSE World Tour – September 28 and 29
- Onew: 2024 Onew Fan Concert 'Hola!' – October 5 and 6
- Jaehyun: 2024 Jaehyun Fan Concert 'MUTE,' – October 26 and 27
- Doyoung: 2024 Doyoung Encore Concert 'Dearest Youth,' – November 1, 2 and 3

=== 2025 ===
- Suho: Suho Concert 2025 ‘Welcome To Su:Home’ (Encore) – January 25 and 26
- GOT7: GOT7 Seoul Concert 2025 ‘NESTFEST’ – January 31, February 1 and 2
- TWS: TWS 1st Fan Meeting "42:Club" – February 14, 15 and 16
- NCT Wish: Log In Asia Tour – March 21 and 23
- Kai: 2025 KAI SOLO CONCERT TOUR <KAION> IN SEOUL – May 17 and 18
- Jay Park: Serenades & Body Rolls World Tour – May 24 and 25
- Xdinary Heroes: Summer Special〈The Xcape〉 – July 4, 5 and 6
- Cravity: Dare to Crave Concert – July 12 and 13
- Onew: Onew the Live: Percent (%) – August 2 and 3
- 10cm: 10cm Concert – August 9 and 10
- Jung Seung Hwan: Hello, Winter: Called Love Concert – December 5, 6 and 7
- Roy Kim: ja, daumm Tour – December 12, 13 and 14

=== 2026 ===
- Daesung: D's Wave Asia Tour – January 2, 3 and 4
- Touched: Highlive IV Concert – January 10 and 11
