= No Limit (EP) =

EP by Monsta X
- Released: November 19, 2021
- Genre: K-pop; hip hop; EDM; R&B
- Length: 22:55
- Language: Korean
- Label: Starship; Kakao

Monsta X chronology
One of a Kind (2021)	No Limit (2021)	The Dreaming (2021)

Singles from No Limit
- 1. "Rush Hour" Released: November 19, 2021

No Limit is the tenth extended play of the South Korean boy group Monsta X. It was released by Starship Entertainment and distributed by Kakao Entertainment on November 19, 2021.

== Background and release ==
The EP was announced on October 24. The tracklist was announced on November 5, with the EP having seven tracks, including the title track "Rush Hour". Joohoney was a co-producer for "Rush Hour", including writing lyrics for the title track alongside I.M, and as a co-writer and a co-producer for the tracks "Autobahn" and "Just Love", while Hyungwon was a co-writer and a co-producer for the track "Mercy". The EP did not feature Shownu, due to him serving his mandatory military enlistment.

Monsta X held a comeback showcase on Universe to introduce the EP alongside its title track on November 18. On November 23, they appeared on Kim Young-chul's SBS Power FM. On that same day, Monsta X showed up on MBC's Idol Radio hosted by members Hyungwon and Joohoney. On November 25, they appeared on SBS' MMTG's Civilization Express hosted by Jaejae. On December 1, Monsta X wrapped up their official activities for the comeback on Naver Now's Midnight Idol hosted by members Kihyun and I.M.

The physical EP was released in four standard versions, with the addition of jewel cases version and KiT version.

== Composition ==
No Limit contains Monsta X's determination to go straight for the world with spirit and confidence, while shining brighter in the age of infinite competition, and also proving the infinite possibilities of "limitless" in any situation.

"Rush Hour" is a hip hop-EDM song expressing the plethoric nature of the K-pop industry as heavy traffic, "Autobahn" is a song with club-ready electronic beat, "Ride with U" is trap beats meet the faintest trace of funk song, "Got Me in Chains" is a song with striking layers of techno and R&B, "Just Love" is a gentle meld of pop and R&B song, "Mercy" is a dark and foreboding song with gothic sonic elements, and "I Got Love" is a generic blend of trap and hip hop song.

== Critical reception ==
Professional ratings
Review scores
Source	Rating
NME	4/5 stars

Reviewing the EP for NME, Carmen Chin showed that it upholds the group's ambition "to unashamedly evolve into musicians who break barriers" and it delivers "quality music shaped by the very hands of Monsta X", with all the tracks "flaunt[ing] either writing or production credits from two or more members of the group at a time".

Divyansha Dongre, writing for Rolling Stone India, wrote that "Rush Hour" captures the group's "vocal prowess and mastery in the hip hop-EDM sphere", adding that its confidence-inspiring lyrical arrangement "effortlessly encapsulates the group's strengths that contributed to their dynamic growth since their debut in 2015".

=== Listicles ===
Name of critic or publication, name of listicle, name of work and rank
Critic/Publication	List	Work	Rank	Ref.
Album
South China Morning Post	25 Best K-pop Albums of 2021	No Limit	25	

== Commercial performance ==
The EP debuted at number four on the monthly Gaon Album Chart and sold more than 400,000 copies in its first month of release in South Korea. Monsta X also received their first Hanteo Chart Silver Certification Plaque for achieving more than 280,000 copies in Initial Chodong sales with No Limit and surpassing their previous record of 197,841 copies with One of a Kind in its first week of release in South Korea.

"Rush Hour" peaked at number 75 on the weekly Gaon Digital Chart, while it debuted at number 142 on the monthly Gaon Digital Chart, making it the group's first entry on the monthly chart for digitals. The track also debuted at number 11 on the weekly Billboard World Digital Song Sales chart, and at number 69 on the weekly Billboard K-pop Hot 100. All the other tracks on the EP did not appear on the Gaon Digital Chart, but did appear on its component, the Gaon Download Chart, with "Autobahn" peaking at 55, "Ride with U" at 59, "Just Love" at 62, "Mercy" at 64, "I Got Love" at 65, and "Got Me in Chains" at 67. It is a career high for Monsta X for number of music program wins, achieving a total of five trophies upon the group's two weeks of promotions, two from The Show, two from Show Champion, and one from Music Bank.

== Track listing ==
No Limit track listing
No.	Title	Lyrics	Music	Arrangement	Length
1.	"Rush Hour"	Joohoney; Ye-Yo!; I.M; Laser; Sam Carter; Brother Su	Joohoney; Ye-Yo!; Sam Carter; Billy Carvin; th!nk; Brother Su; Bae Ki-hyun	Joohoney; Ye-Yo!	3:22
2.	"Autobahn"	I.M; Yoonseok; Wooki; Joohoney	I.M; Yoonseok; Wooki	I.M; Yoonseok; Wooki	3:17
3.	"Ride with U"	Flying Lab; Joohoney; I.M	Hong Kim; Jimmy Claeson	Hong Kim	3:24
4.	"Got Me in Chains"	Wkly; Flying Lab; Joohoney; I.M	Kwon Deuk-geun; PUFF; Davey Nate; C Minor	Kwon Deuk-geun; PUFF	3:07
5.	"Just Love"	I.M; Yoonseok; Wooki; Joohoney	I.M; Yoonseok; Wooki	I.M; Yoonseok; Wooki	3:12
6.	"Mercy"	Hyungwon; Jantine Annika Heij; Joohoney; I.M; Justin Oh	Hyungwon; Justin Oh; Jantine Annika Heij	Hyungwon; Justin Oh; Jantine Annika Heij	3:10
7.	"I Got Love"	Joohoney; Ye-Yo!; Laser; I.M	Joohoney; Ye-Yo!; Laser	Joohoney; Ye-Yo!	3:23
Total length:					22:55

== Charts ==
=== Album ===
==== Weekly charts ====
Chart performance for No Limit
Chart (2021)	Peak position
Japanese Albums (Oricon)	34
South Korean Albums (Gaon)	1

==== Monthly chart ====
Chart performance for No Limit
Chart (2021)	Peak position
South Korean Albums (Gaon)	4

==== Year-end chart ====
Chart performance for No Limit
Chart (2021)	Position
South Korean Albums (Gaon)	30

=== Songs ===
==== Weekly charts ====
Chart performance for "Rush Hour"
Chart (2021)	Peak position
South Korea (Gaon)	75
South Korea (K-pop Hot 100)	69
US World Digital Song Sales (Billboard)	11

==== Monthly chart ====
Chart performance for "Rush Hour"
Chart (2021)	Peak position
South Korea (Gaon)	142

== Certification and sales ==
Certification and sales for No Limit
Region	Certification	Certified units/Sales
South Korea (KMCA)	Platinum	456,266
Japan	—	2,651

== Accolades ==
Music program award for "Rush Hour"
Program	Date (5 total)	Ref.
Music Bank	November 26, 2021	
Show Champion	November 24, 2021	
Show Champion	December 1, 2021	
The Show	November 23, 2021	
The Show	November 30, 2021	

== Release history ==
Release history and formats for No Limit
Region	Date	Format	Label
South Korea	November 19, 2021	CD; digital download; streaming	Starship Entertainment; Kakao Entertainment
Various	November 19, 2021	Digital download; streaming	Starship Entertainment; Kakao Entertainment

== See also ==
- Now Project
- List of certified albums in South Korea
- List of Gaon Album Chart number ones of 2021
- List of K-pop songs on the Billboard charts
- List of K-pop songs on the World Digital Song Sales chart
