= Who Do U Love? (Monsta X song) =

Single by Monsta X featuring French Montana

from the album All About Luv
- Language: English
- Released: June 14, 2019
- Recorded: 2019
- Genre: Pop; R&B
- Length: 3:09
- Label: Epic
- Composers: I.M; Wonho; Hyungwon; Shownu; Joohoney; Kihyun; Minhyuk; Karim Kharbouch; Dan Henig; Jake Torrey; Noah Conrad; Rosanna Ener
- Producers: Jake Torrey; Noah Conrad; will.i.am (Remix)

Monsta X featuring French Montana singles chronology
"Play It Cool" (2019)	"Who Do U Love?" (2019)	"Find You" (2019)

Music video
- "Who Do U Love?" on YouTube

"Who Do U Love?" is a song recorded by the South Korean boy group Monsta X. It was released on June 14, 2019 and the first single from their first English-language album All About Luv. It peaked at number 26 on the US Billboard Mainstream Top 40 Airplay, becomes the group's first single to peak inside the said chart. It was also nominated for Best K-pop at the 2019 MTV Video Music Awards.

== Background and release ==
The song was initially released as a single on June 14, accompanied by a music video on June 21. It was later included in the group's first English-language album All About Luv, released in February 2020.

== Critical reception ==
According to Tamar Herman of Billboard, "Who Do U Love?" demands to be danced to as it is driven by a "blend of sleek bass, snappy beats, and shimmering synths" that create an "addicting, groovy melody" propelled by a "rhythmic choral hook".

=== Listicles ===
Name of critic or publication, name of listicle and rank
Critic/Publication	List	Rank	Ref.
Complex	The 15 Best K-pop and Rap Collaborations of All Time	10th	

== Commercial performance ==
In August 2019, the single debuted on Billboard Mainstream Top 40 Airplay and made Monsta X the second Korean group to reach this milestone, alongside BTS, followed by Blackpink and Loona. It also debuted first on Radio Disney's Top Radio Disney Songs chart and selected as one of Time's "5 Best Songs of the Week".

== Charts ==
Chart performance for "Who Do U Love?"
Chart (2019)	Peak position
US Mainstream Top 40 (Billboard)	26

== Awards and nominations ==
Award ceremony	Year	Category	Result	Ref.
MTV Video Music Award	2019	Best K-pop	Nominated	

== See also ==
- List of K-pop albums on the Billboard charts
