= All About Luv =

Studio album by Monsta X
- Released: February 14, 2020
- Genre: Pop
- Length: 33:05
- Language: English
- Label: Epic

Monsta X chronology
Follow: Find You (2019)	All About Luv (2020)	Fantasia X (2020)

Singles from All About Luv
- 1. "Who Do U Love?" Released: June 14, 2019; 2. "Love U" Released: September 20, 2019; 3. "Someone's Someone" Released: October 4, 2019; 4. "Middle of the Night" Released: December 6, 2019; 5. "You Can't Hold My Heart" Released: April 17, 2020

All About Luv is the sixth and the first English-language studio album by the South Korean boy group Monsta X which features guest appearances from French Montana, Pitbull, and will.i.am. It was released and distributed by Epic Records on February 14, 2020. Its release was preceded by several sporadically released singles, including the songs "Who Do U Love?" featuring French Montana and "Love U". The album also ranked number five on the US Billboard 200 and number seven on the US Rolling Stone Top 200.

== Background ==
It is a pop-oriented album with "electro-pop and R&B melodies", a noted difference from the dance music on their Korean releases. It also features the vocals of Wonho, who left the group in October 2019.

== Promotion ==
Monsta X performed at various locations in and around Los Angeles on the day of the album's release, also holding meet-and-greet and Q&A sessions at Tower Records and The Roxy. Several events on the east coast of the United States were held on February 19 and 20—a release party at the Paramount in Huntington, New York and appearance at the Live Nation store in Manhattan, also a performance at the Chelsea Music Hall.

Monsta X was supposed to tour the United States, throughout June and July 2020 in support of the album, but was postponed due to the COVID-19 pandemic.

== Critical reception ==
Professional ratings
Review scores
Source	Rating
Consequence of Sound	B−
Metro	3.5/5 stars

Tamar Herman of Billboard called the album a "pure blown pop album full of tracks that relay the emotions of romance" with a focus on "an overwhelming sense of sentimentality and smoothness". Jason Lipshutz of Billboard also described it as "an effective and often charming throwback to the harmonizing and hook construction of a bygone era", and as "a time machine worth returning to in recent months".

Sarah Deen, writing for Metro, said that the album "not only shakes off the 'cute' image but boots it up the backside off a cliff" while "the buzzy, EDM sound from their Korean albums has been traded in for club-friendly pop".

Reviewing the album for Variety, Kim Jae-ha wrote that while it was released on Valentine's Day, "its most powerful tracks deal with breakups and deceits" and that the album is "[f]ull of throbbing beats [and] inquisitive lyrics", adding that it's "a sleek production that seamlessly blends soulful pop with elements of hip-hop and EDM". Kim also added that "the Korean group's powerful vocal delivery doesn't get lost in translation", summarizing that with its release, the group "has proven that K-pop transcends language barriers and that is something to be happy about".

=== Listicles ===
Name of critic or publication, name of listicle, name of work and rank
Critic/Publication	List	Work	Rank	Ref.
Album
Billboard	The 50 Best Albums of 2020	All About Luv	Placed (Note: All the albums and songs listed are either unranked or just alphabetically ranked.)	
PopCrush	25 Best Albums of 2020	All About Luv	Placed	
Time	The Albums That Defined K-pop's Monumental Year in 2020	All About Luv	Placed	
Song
BuzzFeed	30 Songs That Helped Define K-pop in 2019	"Someone's Someone"	24	

== Commercial performance ==
The album debuted at number five on the US Billboard 200 with 52,000 album-equivalent units, including 50,000 pure album sales on the first week. It is the group's first entry on the chart, although not their first on the Billboard charts overall. It also debuted at number seven on the US Rolling Stone Top 200 with 41,600 album-equivalent units, including 38,400 pure album sales on the first week, marking Monsta X's first entry on the chart.

== Track listing ==
Standard edition
No.	Title	Writer(s)	Producer(s)	Length
1.	"Who Do U Love?" (feat. French Montana)	I.M; Wonho; Hyungwon; Shownu; Joohoney; Kihyun; Minhyuk; Karim Kharbouch; Dan Henig; Jake Torrey; Noah Conrad; Rosanna Ener	Jake Torrey; Noah Conrad	3:09
2.	"Love U"	Andrés Torres; Torrey; Mauricio Rengifo; Michael Matosic	Andrés Torres; Mauricio Rengifo	2:40
3.	"Happy Without Me"	Torres; David Hodges; James LaVigne; Rengifo	Torres; Rengifo	2:58
4.	"Got My Number"	Ben Samama; Joren van der Voort; Rob Grimaldi	Rob Grimaldi	2:51
5.	"Someone's Someone"	Shownu; Connor McDonough; Riley McDonough; Toby McDonough; Jeff Sojka; Josh Zegan	Connor McDonough	2:21
6.	"Middle of the Night"	I.M; Wonho; Hyungwon; Shownu; Joohoney; Kihyun; Minhyuk; Ali Payami; John Mitchell	Ali Payami	2:46
7.	"She's The One"	Brandon Arreaga; Torrey; Conrad; Roland Spreckley; Tony Ferrari	Conrad	3:19
8.	"You Can't Hold My Heart"	Anthony M. Jones; Jeffrey Gitelman; Jonathan Bellion; Steven Franks; Tommy Brown	Jeffrey Gitelman; Mr. Franks; Tommy Brown; Tone	3:01
9.	"Misbehave"	Andrew Bullimore; Derrick Milano; The Invisible Men; Josh Record	The Invisible Men; You	3:24
10.	"Beside U" (feat. Pitbull)	I.M; Hyungwon; Shownu; Joohoney; Kihyun; Minhyuk; Armando Perez; Angel Lopez; Daniel Ryan Winsch; Eshy Gazit; Federico Vindver; Timothy Mosley	Team	3:08
11.	"Who Do U Love?" (will.i.am remix; feat. French Montana)	I.M; Wonho; Hyungwon; Shownu; Joohoney; Kihyun; Minhyuk; Henig; Torrey; Kharbouch; Conrad; Ener	will.i.am	3:28
Total length:				33:05

Extended version bonus track
No.	Title	Writer(s)	Producer(s)	Length
12.	"Beside U" (I.M rap version; feat. Pitbull)	I.M; Hyungwon; Shownu; Joohoney; Kihyun; Minhyuk; Perez; Lopez; Winsch; Gazit; Vindver; Mosley	Team	3:33
Total length:				36:38

== Charts ==
Chart performance for All About Luv
Chart (2020)	Peak position
Belgian Albums (Ultratop Flanders)	127
Canadian Albums (Billboard)	10
Croatian International Albums (HDU)	4
French Albums (SNEP)	63
Hungarian Albums (MAHASZ)	16
Japanese Hot Albums (Billboard Japan)	63
Japanese Albums (Oricon)	18
Polish Albums (ZPAV)	18
Portuguese Albums (AFP)	4
Scottish Albums (OCC)	54
Spanish Albums (PROMUSICAE)	16
Swiss Albums (Schweizer Hitparade)	36
UK Albums Sales (OCC)	44
UK Digital Albums (OCC)	53
US Billboard 200	5
US Rolling Stone Top 200	7

Chart performance for "Who Do U Love?"
Chart (2019)	Peak position
US Mainstream Top 40 (Billboard)	26

Chart performance for "You Can't Hold My Heart"
Chart (2020)	Peak position
US Mainstream Top 40 (Billboard)	40

== Awards and nominations ==
Name of the award ceremony, year presented, award category, nominated work and the result of the nomination
Award ceremony	Year	Category	Nominated work	Result	Ref.
MTV Video Music Awards	2019	Best K-pop	"Who Do U Love?" feat. French Montana	Nominated	
MTV Video Music Awards	2020	Best K-pop	"Someone's Someone"	Nominated	

== See also ==
- List of K-pop songs on the Billboard charts
- List of K-pop albums on the Billboard charts
