= Lee Min-hyuk (singer, born 1993) =

South Korean singer

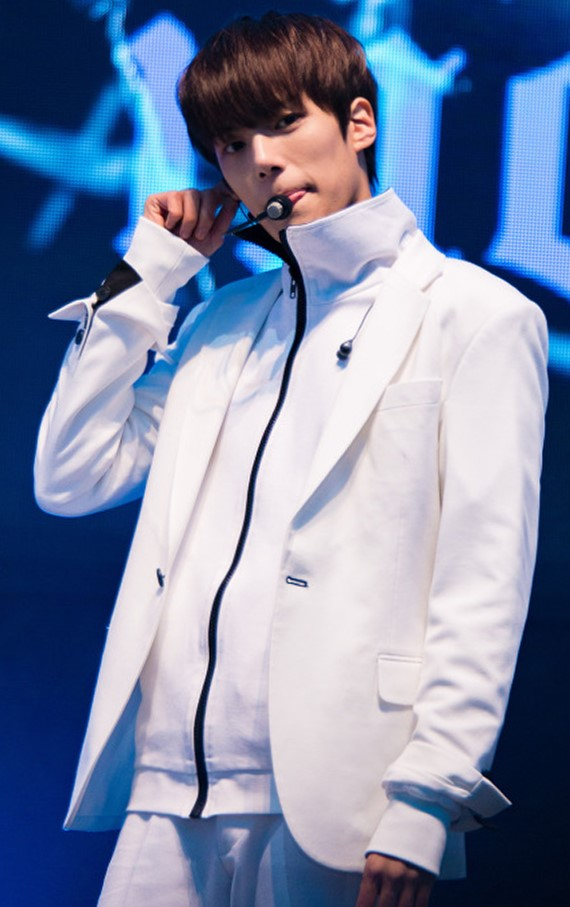
- Minhyuk at KBS in October 2016
- Born: November 3, 1993 (age 33); Seoul, South Korea
- Occupations: Singer; MC
- Musical career
- Genre: K-pop
- Instrument: Vocals
- Years active: 2015–present
- Label: Starship
- Member of: Monsta X

Korean name
- Hangul: 이민혁
- Hanja: 李玟爀
- RR: I Minhyeok
- MR: I Minhyŏk

Signature
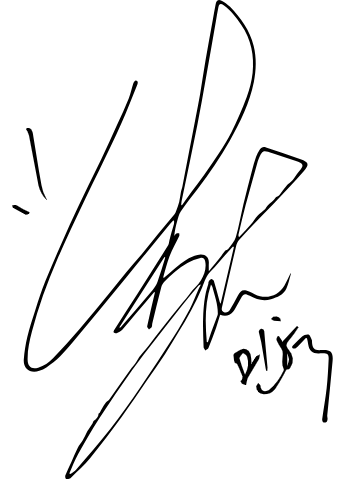

Lee Min-hyuk (Korean: 이민혁, born November 3, 1993), known mononymously as Minhyuk, is a South Korean singer and MC. He is a member of South Korean boy group Monsta X under Starship Entertainment.

== Early life and debut ==
Minhyuk was born in Jungnang District, Seoul, South Korea on November 3, 1993.

Starting in December 2014, he competed in the Mnet's survival show No.Mercy. In the finale of the show, he was the final member of the seven contestants confirmed to be debuting in Starship Entertainment's new boy group Monsta X.

== Career ==
=== 2015–2018: Monsta X and career beginnings ===
In May 2015, Minhyuk debuted with Monsta X, with their first EP Trespass.

In October 2018, Minhyuk is a credited writer for their song "널하다" (I Do Love U), from Monsta X's second studio album Take.1 Are You There?.

=== 2019–present: MC roles and solo work ===
In June 2019, he released a mixtape single "Ongsimi" (옹심이), with a music video released through Starship Entertainment's YouTube channel. The single featured his fellow group member Joohoney, and was described by him as an "EDM Hip Trot".

Beginning late 2019, Minhyuk began expanding his individual activities, including being part of the three MCs for SBS' Inkigayo, alongside Naeun of April and Jaehyun of NCT 127, hosting the show weekly every Sunday, starting in October. For Monsta X's sixth studio album All About Luv, he is a credited writer and composer on three of their tracks.

In July 2020, Minhyuk launched the Vogue Ship Show on Naver Now, a weekly radio show that focuses on creating art while connecting with fans. Most episodes host guests, usually other idols, including members of g.o.d., labelmates such as Jeong Se-woon, and members of Cravity, as well as group members from Monsta X.

In August, it was announced that he would be featured on the soundtrack for She's My Type, released through Daum. The song "Have a Goodnight", was released on September 11, as a duet with group member Shownu. On August 20, Minhyuk was announced as one of the MCs for the KT Seezn program Back to the Idol, alongside Eunhyuk of Super Junior. In November, he appeared on King of Mask Singer with the identity of "Baepsae", winning the first two rounds he competed in, but losing in the third round.

In June 2021, Minhyuk and Hyungwon appeared as part of the cast for the Youtube channel Inssa Oppa. The two played different "sub-characters" for each episode to introduce the latest trends and G-Market global shop products. In July, he also joined the cast of the variety show Our Neighborhood Class as the youngest member. The show focused on the "makeover" of neighborhoods across the country, as well as returning for the second season of Back to the Idol, which began airing in mid-August, with Eunhyuk.

In March 2022, Minhyuk and Hyungwon returned in the sixth season of Inssa Oppa. For the concept of this season, these two will move freely to any desired time, such as the past, present, and future, under the concept of "what if" and perform situational plays on various themes. On March 15, he went to the Valentino Beauty's launch event pop-up store in Seoul. Minhyuk tested positive for COVID-19 on March 31. On August 25, he attended the Montblanc's pop-up store in Seoul, held under the brand's global campaign "On the Move". On September 6, Minhyuk returned for the second season of Vogue Ship Show on Naver Now.

On October 14, he and Leeseo of Ive attended the Häagen-Dazs' special exhibition "Melting Point", in collaboration with Lotte Department Store, held in Seoul. On November 28, Minhyuk alongside celebrities such as Kim Da-mi, Lee Joo-myung, and Irene Kim, attended the Fendi's special collection pop-up store, to commemorate the 25th anniversary of the baguette bag, held in Seoul.

In February 2023, he and Hyungwon attended the Dyson Style Lab pop-up store's opening ceremony, held in Seoul. On March 20, Minhyuk appeared on the cover of the lifestyle and fashion magazine Singles Korea's April issue. Starting in May, he released his own content Let's GO!5rae through Monsta X's YouTube channel.

In October 2024, Minhyuk held a free fan event after his military discharge.

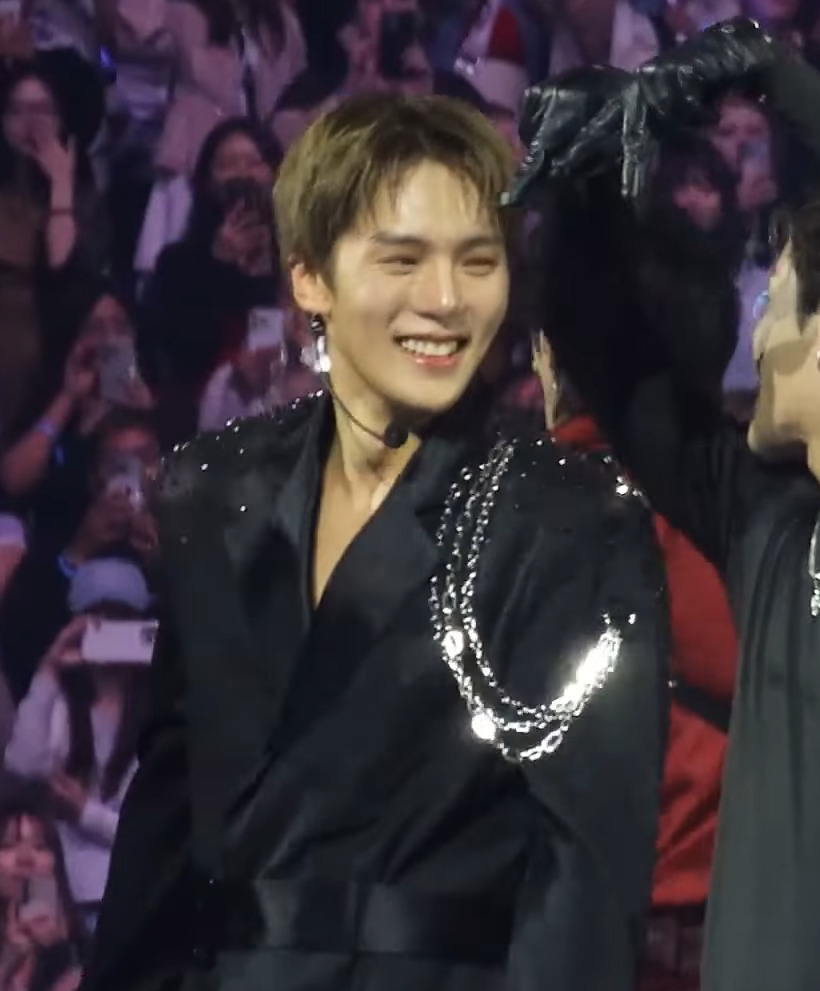
Minhyuk at KCON LA in 2025

In March 2025, it was announced that he will be the honorary first pitcher for the 2025 KBO League, during the game of LG Twins and Hanwha Eagles, to be held at Jamsil Baseball Stadium in Seoul.

In May 2026, Minhyuk attended the K-Tourism Roadshow in Taipei, alongside 33 other entities, participating in a talk concert promoting Korean bicycle travel destinations. On June 19, he released his first solo digital single "Reaching", which Minhyuk performed at The X: Nexus World Tour, produced by Ha Hyun-sang of Hoppipolla. In October, he joined the web reality series K-Wellness Shi:m, as part of the Korean Culture and Information Service program, alongside Yoseob and Gikwang of Highlight.

== Personal life ==
Minhyuk had expressed his love for whales, associating various images of them with himself.

=== Military service ===
Minhyuk enlisted for his mandatory military service as part of the military band, with 5th Infantry Division at Yeoncheon army base in North Gyeonggi Province on April 4, 2023. On October 6–10, he performed at the Ground Forces Festival (also known as Army Fest), held in Gyeryong, South Chungcheong Province. Minhyuk was scheduled to be discharged on September 30, 2024. He was officially discharged on October 3, 2024.

== Artistry ==
=== Musical style and influences ===
As the sub-vocalist of Monsta X, Minhyuk had been described to possess a vocal range with "husky voice in low tones" and "smooth, beautiful voice in high tones".

He had cited Junsu of JYJ, Kyuhyun of Super Junior, Yoseob of Highlight, and Mino of Winner as his role models.

=== Stage and aesthetics ===
Both on and off stage, Minhyuk pursues "perfectionism". He performs with "intense facial expression and choreography" on stage, while his "friendly and passionate charm" showing through his "activeness and easygoingness" off stage.

== Public image and impact ==
Minhyuk is known as the "vitamin" of Monsta X because of his bright personality, as well as "cheerful, friendly, and witty" by his colleagues in the music industry. He is also known as a "blue chip" in the South Korean entertainment industry for appearing regularly on numerous entertainment programs since 2018.

Minhyuk was consistently placed in Tumblr's "Most Popular K-pop Stars", ranking 48th in 2018, 59th in 2019, 70th in 2020, 74th in 2021, and 78th in 2022, as well as consistently ranked in the "Individual Boy Group Members Brand Power Ranking" published by the Korean Corporate Reputation Research Institute, with the highest ranking at 12th in April 2025.

His labelmate Cravity had cited him as a role model.

== Other ventures ==
=== Ambassadorship ===
In November 2021, as part of Monsta X's promotional campaign for traditional Korean culture, Minhyuk and Hyungwon participated in a video narration for the YouTube series Kimchi Universe 3, jointly produced by Daesang Jonggajib and World Kimchi Research Institute together with Professor Seo Kyung-duk of Sungshin Women's University. The video explains how kimchi became known all over the world through the 1986 Asian Games and 1988 Seoul Olympics, culminating with Gimjang, the traditional practice of preparing and preserving kimchi, being registered on the UNESCO Intangible Cultural Heritage of Humanity in 2013.

In November 2025, he appeared in a bicycle travel content Follow Me, produced by the Korea Tourism Organization, presenting various bicycle paths selected as "60 Representative Bicycle Free Travel Courses in Korea", as well as those listed in the Ministry of Culture, Sports and Tourism's "Bicycle Travel Promotion" contest.

=== Arts and photography ===
In 2016, Minhyuk alongside Kihyun held a special exhibition "Moment in November" at the Space Art 1 in Jung-gu, Seoul from November 26 to 27. Under the theme of "moment", this exhibition consists of Kihyun's photos and Minhyuk's calligraphy and drawings. A space was also prepared for them to see the before and after Monsta X's debut photos, undisclosed polaroids, childhood photos, their cherished items, as well as events for fans due to the warm response from domestic and foreign fans, and to repay the support they showed during the group's activities.

In 2022, Minhyuk works for the album artwork of Monsta X's eleventh EP Shape of Love. He showed his affection for fans, by putting the words written by the fan cafe on the canvas, photos of the concert hall, and the memories of Monbebe in one place, as well as mobilizing a photo book.

In 2023, Minhyuk held a collaborative exhibition with the street artist Doezny and the PepsiCo's carbonated soft drink brand Mountain Dew. Through this collaboration, the two artists recreated Mountain Dew into various graphic works such as posters, paintings, and digital art containing K-pop and street culture, which will be released as new content in the future in connection with the "2023 Mountain Dew Music Project".

In 2024, he hosted an art talk show at the 2024 France K-Expo in Paris, a joint event organized by the Ministry of Culture, Sports and Tourism and Korea Creative Content Agency, to promote the South Korean culture in Europe.

In 2025, Minhyuk participated as an audio guide in the "Moment That Stays, Heart That Flows" exhibition for modern and contemporary Korean art, held at the Suwon Museum of Art, in commemoration of its 10th anniversary.

=== Endorsements ===
In July 2021, he was selected as the global ambassador by the French premium mineral water brand Evian through the fashion magazine Esquire Korea. On July 16, Minhyuk and Shownu also appeared in the fashion magazine W Korea, promoting the German premium luggage brand Rimowa. On August 13, he was selected by the American clothing brand Champion as its Korean model and will be part of the 2021 F/W pictorial.

In February 2022, Minhyuk became one of the faces of the Korean cosmetics and skincare brand Olive Young's Vegan Beauty campaign, alongside group member Joohoney and his labelmate Liz of Ive. In April, he became the new model for the Korean fashion shoes and accessories brand Shoopen. On July 7, Minhyuk became the new face and exclusive model in Korea and in Japan for the skincare brand Floun. In November, he was selected as an advertising model for the American sports culture brand NFL's 2022 F/W collection through the fashion magazine Dazed Korea, including its 2023 S/S collection. On November 28, Floun had renewed Minhyuk's exclusive model contract.

In March 2023, he posted several photos of the American luxury jewelry brand and specialty design house Tiffany & Co. through the fashion magazine Esquire Korea's Instagram. Upon his enlistment, NFL unveiled its 2023 summer collection lookbook with brand model Minhyuk, which consists of various sports casual products, including its T-shirts and jackets with colorful colors and sensuous team logo graphics.

=== Philanthropy ===
In November 2016, proceeds from the 2-days special exhibition "Moment in November" were donated in the names of Minhyuk, Kihyun, and fan club, Monbebe.

In April 2019, he donated to the Sokcho forest fire under the name of his fan club, Monbebe, as well as drew a relay donation from fans.

In November 2020, Minhyuk, alongside Monbebe, donated ₩1,933,113 to the international relief and development NGO Save the Children Korea, in commemoration of his birthday, and to help children suffering from COVID-19.

In November 2021, he donated ₩500,000 through the idol fandom community service My Favorite Idol, for his birthday. It will be delivered to the Miral Welfare Foundation and used as a fund for the disabled who are isolated due to COVID-19.

In October 2022, Minhyuk, alongside celebrities such as Park Bo-gum, Jung Hae-in, and Lee Se-young, agreed to wear grandma's handicraft brand Marco Roho's products such as rings and bracelets, which also advocates a social lifestyle brand, starting with the purpose of creating sustainable jobs for elderly women, who have reduced social participation, as well as having difficulties in becoming economically independent. The same month, he participated in the fashion magazine W Korea's breast cancer awareness campaign "Love Your W" charity event, alongside his group member Hyungwon.

In March 2023, Minhyuk participated in a charity auction of his cherished items, from paintings, custom bags, and rings, and all the proceeds will be donated.

In October 2024, he participated in the fashion magazine W Korea's breast cancer awareness campaign "Love Your W" charity event, alongside his group member Shownu.

== Discography ==
=== Singles ===
==== As lead artist ====
List of singles, showing year released, chart positions and album name
Title	Year	Peak chart positions	Album
Title	Year	KOR	Album
"Ongsimi" (옹심이) (feat. Joohoney)	2019	—	Non-album single
"Reaching"	2026	TBA	Non-album single
"—" denotes releases that did not chart or were not released in that region.

==== Collaborative singles ====
List of collaborative singles, showing year released, chart positions and album name
Title	Year	Peak chart positions	Album
Title	Year	US World	Album
"Moon" (with Astro, Viviz, Kihyun, I.M, Hoshi, Wonwoo, Mingyu, DK, Seungkwan, Hello Gloom, Rocky, Yoojung, Doyeon, Chani, Bang Chan, and Moon Sua)	2025	4	Non-album single

=== Soundtrack appearances ===
Title	Year	Album	Artist(s)	Ref.
"Have a Goodnight"	2020	She's My Type OST Part 6	Minhyuk and Shownu	

== Videography ==
=== Music videos ===
Title	Year	Artist(s)	Director	Ref.
"Ongsimi" (옹심이)	2019	Minhyuk (feat. Joohoney)	—N/a	

=== Other videos ===
Title	Year	Artist(s)	Notes	Ref.
"Reaching"	2026	Minhyuk	Special Clip	

== Filmography ==
=== Television shows ===
Year	Title	Role	Note	Ref.
2014–2015	No.Mercy	Contestant	7th member announced as part of Monsta X	
2016	Inkigayo	Special MC	with Kihyun, Nayeon, and Tzuyu	
2016	M Countdown	Special MC	with Kihyun and Chaeyeon	
2018	Law of the Jungle in Patagonia	Cast	February 2 – March 2 (Episode 302–305)	
2018	My Math Puberty	Cast	with Lee Chun-soo, Park Ji-yoon, Daisy, and Sunwoo	
2019–2021	Inkigayo	MC	with Jaehyun and Naeun	
2020	Weekly Idol	Special MC	with Kihyun for Oneus (Episode 454)	
2020	Stars' Top Recipe at Fun-Staurant	Special MC	with Heo Kyung-hwan (Episode 43–45)	
2020	King of Mask Singer	Contestant	as "Baepsae" (Episode 279–280)	
2021	Our Neighborhood Class	Cast	with Kim Soo-ro, Lee Soo-geun, Lee Jin-ho, Na Tae-ju, and Lee Hye-sung	
2021	Back to the Idol	MC	with Eunhyuk (Season 2)	
2022	Fantastic Family	Judge	with Joohoney, YooA, and Seunghee	
2022	Weekly Idol	Special MC	for Kep1er and Viviz (Episode 547–548)	
2023	Show! Music Core	Special MC	with Joohoney	
2025	Weekly Idol	MC	with Hyeongjun	

=== Web series ===
Year	Title	Role	Note	Ref.
2021	Kimchi Universe 3	Video Narrator	with Hyungwon	
2025–2026	Follow Me	MC		
2026	K-Wellness Shi:m	MC	with Yoseob and Gikwang	

=== Web shows ===
Year	Title	Role	Note	Ref.
2020	Back to the Idol	MC	Season 1	
2020–2021	Vogue Ship Show	MC	Season 1	
2021–2022	Inssa Oppa	Cast	Season 5 and Season 6	
2022	Vogue Ship Show	MC	Season 1 (Special Edition)	
2022	X: New World	Cast	Season 2	
2022–2023	Vogue Ship Show	MC	Season 2	
2025	Debut's Plan	Special MC	Episode 4	

=== Events ===
Year	Event	Role	Note	Ref.
2021	Cravity Comeback Showcase	MC	The Awakening: Written in the Stars	

== Songwriting ==
All credits are adapted from the Korea Music Copyright Association, unless stated otherwise.

Year	Artist(s)	Song	Album	Lyrics		Music		Arrangement	
Year	Artist(s)	Song	Album	Credited	With	Credited	With	Credited	With
2018	Monsta X	"널하다" (I Do Love U)	Take.1 Are You There?	Yes	Wonho; Kihyun; Jooheon; I.M	No	N/A	No	N/A
2019	Monsta X feat. French Montana	"Who Do U Love?"	All About Luv	Yes	I.M; Wonho; Hyungwon; Kihyun; Joohoney; Shownu; French Montana; Dan Henig; Jake Torrey; Noah Conrad; Rosanna Ener	Yes	I.M; Wonho; Hyungwon; Kihyun; Joohoney; Shownu; French Montana; Dan Henig; Jake Torrey; Noah Conrad; Rosanna Ener	No	N/A
2020	Monsta X	"Middle of the Night"	All About Luv	No	N/A	Yes	I.M; Wonho; Hyungwon; Kihyun; Joohoney; Shownu; Ali Payami; John Mitchell	No	N/A

== Awards and nominations ==
Name of the award ceremony, year presented, category, recipient of the award and the result of the nomination
Award ceremony	Year	Category	Recipient	Result	Ref.
KBS Entertainment Awards	2025	Digital Content Award (Note: Shared with the whole cast.)	Idol 1N2D	Won	
Korea First Brand Awards (Note: Hosted by the Korea Consumer Brand Committee and the Korea Consumer Forum, the Korea First Brand Awards based its winners on a nationwide South Korean survey.)	2022	Most Anticipated Variety Show Idol	Minhyuk	Nominated	
Korea First Brand Awards	2023	Live Streaming Show DJ	Vogue Ship Show Season 2	Nominated	
