= LiveOne =

Music streaming platform

- Company type: Public
- Traded as: NASDAQ: LVO
- Founded: 2015; 11 years ago
- Predecessors: Slacker; LiveXLive
- Country of origin: United States
- Founder: Rob Ellin
- Key people: Rob Ellin (Chairman & CEO)
- Industry: Audio streaming; Video streaming; Livestreaming; Podcasting
- Revenue: ▼US$77.1 million (2026)
- Net income: ▼ −US$21.0 million (2026)
- Website: liveone.com
- Registration: Optional

LiveOne (formerly known as LiveXLive) is a Los Angeles-based streaming platform that provides livestreams of concerts and festivals, curated radio stations, podcasts, and original artist video and audio content.

== History ==
=== LiveXLive ===
LiveXLive was founded by Rob Ellin in 2015. It acquired Wantickets in February 2016, allowing the business to enter the music ticketing sector. It lost $14.2 million in fiscal year 2016, on revenue of $225,000. In 2017, the company began signing content partnerships with internet personalities, including Amanda Cerny, King Bach, and Jake Paul, with Cerny later named head of its talent division. In August 2017, its parent company, Loton Corp, became LiveXLive Media.

In September 2017, LiveXLive acquired Slacker Radio for $50 million. When the deal closed in January 2018, Slacker had 1.5 million monthly active and 400,00 paid subscribers, and was rebranded as LiveXLive in April 2019. By the end of June 2020, it had 877,000 subscribers. LiveXLive launched its IPO at the end of 2017, becoming a public company.

In May 2018, LiveXLive signed a five-year deal with Sziget Festival to be its official livestreaming and content partner. The company also introduced Live Zone, its on-site coverage experience, featuring pre- and post-show reporting. By January 2019, the company had a roster of over 27 festivals, including EDC, Life Is Beautiful, HARD Summer, Rock In Rio, and Rolling Loud.

Beginning in 2020, LiveXLive announced several acquisitions and new offerings as part of its effort to expand throughout the music industry. In February, the company announced the acquisition of EDM promoter React Presents for $2 million. It bought PodcastOne for $18.1 million in May. At the time, its library of 300 podcasts generated over 2.1 billion downloads per year. It also launched a pay-per-view live stream offering for performances and events. In June, the company launched its LiveXLive streaming app for smart TVs.

As a publicly traded company, LiveXLive drew criticism when it received nearly $2 million in PPP loans from the federal government during the COVID-19 pandemic. Acquiring PodcastOne after receiving the loan also put the company in danger of an audit, though LiveXLive remained committed to keeping the money.

The company announced a content and revenue sharing partnership with Pitbull in July 2020. The deal included PPV live performances starting that fall and the launch of a video podcast on PodcastOne. In October, it announced the acquisition of Addison, IL-based merch business, Custom Personalization Solutions. In November, LiveXLive launched a music publishing division as well as a 24/7 music channel on the free tier of Sling TV.

LiveXLive acquired Modern Drummer in May 2021 and brand development company Gramophone Media, Inc. in June. Also in June, the company produced and distributed the controversial Social Gloves: Battle of the Platforms pay-per-view event that pit YouTube and TikTok influencers against one another. LiveXLive quickly followed up with an all-female event called Self Made KO.

=== LiveOne ===
In September 2021, the company announced its rebrand from LiveXLive to LiveOne. React Presents was rebranded as ReactOne and Slacker Radio became SlackerOne. The company's pay-per-view business was spun out as a separate public company, PPVOne. At this time, the company had streamed 1,800 artists since January 2020, and boasted a library of nearly 30 million songs, 500 curated radio stations, and hundreds of pay-per-view channels.

In June 2022, US performance rights organization SoundExchange sued Slacker, Inc. and LiveOne over unpaid royalties. The lawsuit claimed that Slacker had stopped paying statutory royalties to creators in 2017, after the acquisition by LiveOne (then LiveXLive). On October 13, the United States District Court for the Central District of California ordered Slacker and LiveOne to pay $9.7 million in unpaid royalties.

In May 2023, a press release announced a proposed plan for the company to acquire certain IP assets from the Kast Media, podcasting network. However, it was later revealed that Kast was not paying its creators when multiple podcasters spoke out against the company. A report from The Verge detailed that the deal would have involved Kast paying a portion of the ad revenue owed if the creators agreed to a deal to join PodcastOne's network.

Starting in 2022, LiveOne planned to spin off PodcastOne and Slacker Radio as separate companies. In September 2023, PodcastOne was officially spun out, but its stock price quickly tumbled following the Kast Media allegations. Plans for Slacker to be merged with a special-purpose acquisition company were scrapped in October.

For years, the company's streaming app was included in Tesla's Premium Connectivity subscription. However, this changed starting in December 2024. As a result of the company losing a significant revenue stream, LiveOne's stock price fell by 23% when the change was announced in October. But the company rolled out discounted premium options and a free tier for Tesla users, and by the end of the year, LiveOne had 450,000 listeners, claiming that user engagement actually increased. By April 2025, the company had 1.5 million subscribers.

Following the sale of Napster for $207 million, LiveOne announced in April 2025 that it would explore strategic options for the company that could include selling itself or its podcasting and streaming divisions.
