= List of Wonho live performances =

Wonho live performances
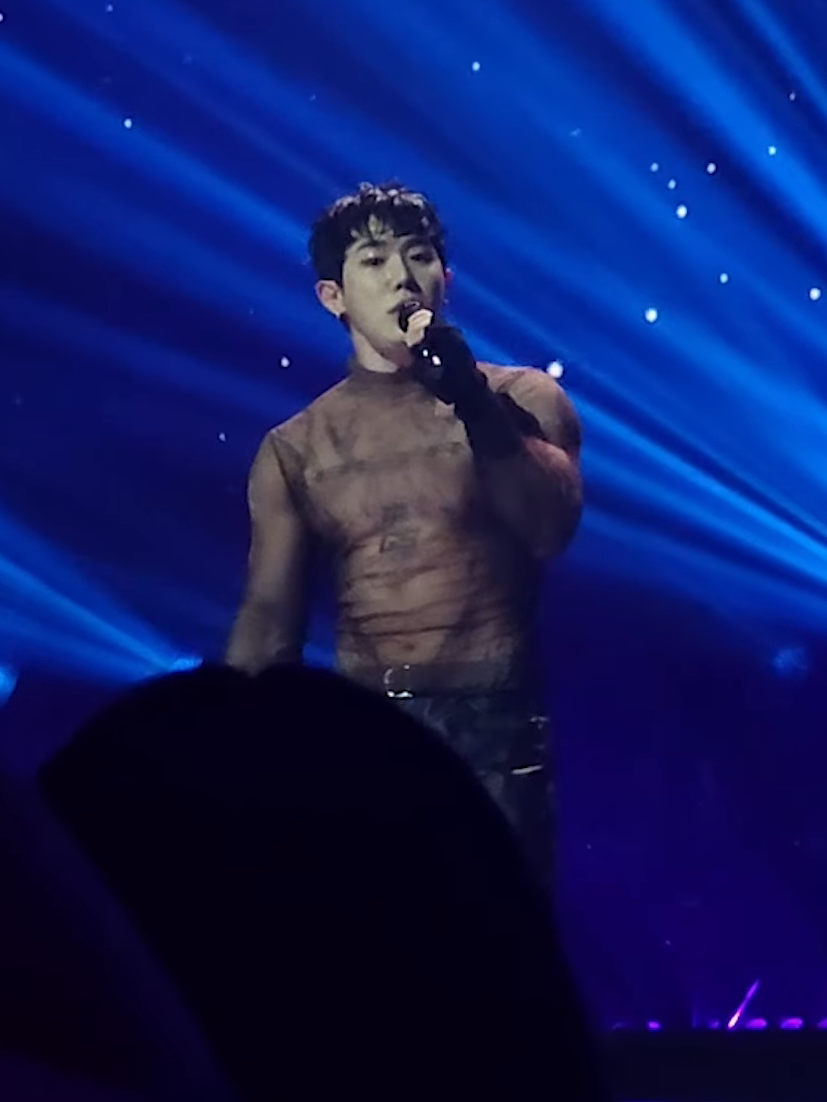
- Wonho performing in Durant, Oklahoma in 2025
- Concert tours: 2
- Promotional concerts: 10
- Fan meeting tours: 2
- Festival appearances: 13
- Award show performances: 3
- Televised performances: 60

The South Korean singer Wonho has released a studio album, four extended plays (EPs) and two single albums since his debut as a soloist, following his departure from boy group Monsta X, spawning two concert tours, five promotional concert runs and two fan meeting tours. He has also performed in multiple award shows and done televised appearances, largely promoting releases in South Korean music shows.

Following the release of his two-part mini album, Love Synonym Pt.1: Right for Me (2020) and Love Synonym Pt.2: Right for Us (2021), Wonho held two online concerts, IWonhoYou and WeNeedLove, on the streaming platform LiveXLive following each release, respectively. Later in the same year, he held his first in-person concert in Seoul titled We Are Young, which was in support of the EP Blue Letter (2021).

Throughout 2022, Wonho held his first international performances, beginning with his first fan meeting tour, Ohhoho Trip, across Asia from July to October. He then embarked on his first concert tour, the Facade European Tour, from August to September in support of his EP Facade (2022). Before his mandatory South Korea military service enlistment, he held a promotional concert for his single album Bittersweet (2022) on December 3, 2022 in Seoul, titled Everyday Christmas.

After being discharged from the South Korea military service in 2024, Wonho held his second fan meeting tour, Welcome Back, Wenee, across South Korea and the United States, and took part in the iHeartRadio Jingle Ball Tour in support of his single "What Would You Do". In 2025, Wonho released his first studio album, Syndrome, which was supported by his second concert tour, the Stay Awake World Tour. Spanning from July 2025 to March 2026, the tour marked his first solo performances in South America and included additional dates across North America, Europe, and Asia. In 2026, he is scheduled to perform three shows in the United States from July to August as part of a concert run supporting his upcoming EP, Core (2026).

== Concert tours ==
List of concert tours
Title	Dates	Associated album	Continent(s)	Shows	Ref.
Facade European Tour	August 28, 2022 – September 4, 2022	Facade	Europe	4	
Stay Awake World Tour	July 12, 2025 – March 1, 2026	Syndrome	Asia; Europe; North America; South America	29	

== Facade European Tour ==
Facade European Tour
- Continental tour by Wonho
- Location: Europe
- Associated album: Facade
- Start date: August 28, 2022
- End date: September 4, 2022
- No. of shows: 4

Wonho concert chronology
- Facade European Tour (2022); Stay Awake World Tour (2025–2026)

The Facade European Tour is the first concert tour by the South Korean singer Wonho. In support of his third extended play (EP), Facade (2022), the tour began on August 28, 2022 in Munich, Germany at TonHalle, and finished on September 4, in London, England at Indigo at the O_{2}. The tour's set list included songs from previously released projects, alongside Facade's sole single, "Crazy". It marked Wonho's first headlining concert outside of South Korea, and his first solo tour in Europe.

=== Background ===
In an interview with Rolling Stone, Wonho initially teased a tour in support of his third EP, Facade (2022). On July 6, 2022, a poster announcing the Facade European Tour, alongside its dates, was published by Highline Entertainment via Wonho's social media channels.

=== Tour dates ===
List of concerts
Date (2022)	City	Country	Venue
August 28	Munich	Germany	TonHalle
August 31	Oberhausen	Germany	Turbinenhalle 2
September 2	Madrid	Spain	Palacio Vistalegre
September 4	London	England	Indigo at the O_{2}

== Stay Awake World Tour ==
Stay Awake World Tour
- World tour by Wonho
- Location: Europe; Latin America; Asia
- Associated album: Syndrome
- Start date: July 12, 2025
- End date: March 1, 2026
- Legs: 3
- No. of shows: 16
- Supporting act: Q Are

Wonho concert chronology
- Facade European Tour (2022); Stay Awake World Tour (2025–2026)

The Stay Awake World Tour is the second concert tour by the South Korean singer Wonho, in support of his first solo studio album, Syndrome (2025). The tour began with in Santiago, Chile on July 12, 2025, and finished in Seoul, South Korea on March 1, 2026. The tour's only opening act was Chilean boy band Q Are, who performed at the tour's opening show in Santiago.

The tour commenced with its Latin American leg, followed by shows in Europe. In 2026, a show was announced for Japan, marking the tour's first Asian date. A final tour stop in Seoul celebrating the singer's birthday took place on March 1, 2026. An 11-date North American leg was scheduled to follow the tour's European leg, with it being ultimately cancelled due to operational issues with the tour's local promoter.

=== Development ===
The Stay Awake World Tour was announced by Highline Entertainment on May 23, 2025, via Wonho's social media channels, initially revealing the dates for its Latin American leg, which included four shows across Chile, Brazil and Mexico. A European leg was announced on July 10, spanning ten dates across eight countries. Dates for a North American leg were revealed on September 27, 2025, which included ten shows in the United States and one show in Canada. The North American leg was ultimately cancelled due to operational issues with its local promoter. The tour's first Asian date was announced on January 2, 2026, taking place in Saitama, Japan. The tour's final date was announced on January 26, which took place in Seoul, South Korea.

=== Set list ===
This set list was taken from the concert on July 12, 2025, in Santiago. It does not represent all shows throughout the tour.

VCR 1 – Awakening

1. "Better Than Me"
2. "With You"
3. "Eye On You"
4. "Blue"
5. "Best Shot"
6. "Devil"

VCR 2 – Between Dreams

1. "Stranger"
2. "Losing You"
3. "Close"
4. "Ain't About You"
5. "24/7"
6. "Crazy"

VCR 3 – All for You

1. "Mala"
2. "Down"
3. "What Would You Do"
4. "Lose"
5. "Open Mind"

VCR 4 – Encore

1. "Somebody"
2. "Weneed"
3. "Flash"

==== Notes ====
- On March 1, 2026 in Seoul, Wonho performed "Good Liar" and "At the Time".
- Across various dates, "Down" and "Mala" were repeated throughout the show's encore.

=== Tour dates ===
List of 2025 concerts
Date (2025)	City	Country	Venue	Supporting act
July 12	Santiago	Chile	Teatro Caupolicán	Q Are
July 15	São Paulo	Brazil	Terra SP	—
July 18	Monterrey	México	Showcenter Complex	—
July 20	México City	México	Auditorio BB (Note: Venue changed from Carpa Velodrómo following fan complaints)	—
September 7	Paris	France	Bataclan	—
September 9	Madrid	Spain	Sala La Riviera	—
September 11	London	England	Shepherd's Bush Empire	—
September 15	Brussels	Belgium	La Madeleine	—
September 17	Tilburg	Netherlands	013 Poppodium	—
September 19	Cologne	Germany	Carlswerk Victoria	—
September 21	Warsaw	Poland	Progresja	—
September 23	Berlin	Germany	Huxleys Neue Welt	—
September 25	Hamburg	Germany	Große Freiheit 36	—
September 27	Helsinki	Finland	Kulttuuritalo	—

List of 2026 concerts
Date (2026)	City	Country	Venue
February 23	Sayama	Japan	Sayama City Center Big Hall
March 1	Seoul	South Korea	Yes24 Wanderloch Hall

==== Canceled shows ====
List of canceled concerts
Date (2026)	City	Country	Venue	Reason
November 14	Toronto	Canada	Queen Elizabeth Theatre	Operational issues with promoter
November 16	New York City	United States	Terminal 5	Operational issues with promoter
November 18	Washington, D.C.	United States	Warner Theatre	Operational issues with promoter
November 20	Chicago	United States	Copernicus Center	Operational issues with promoter
November 21	Atlanta	United States	Variety Playhouse	Operational issues with promoter
November 24	Miami	United States	Miami Beach Bandshell	Operational issues with promoter
November 26	Houston	United States	Warehouse Live Midtown	Operational issues with promoter
November 28	Dallas	United States	The Bomb Factory	Operational issues with promoter
November 30	San Francisco	United States	The Warfield	Operational issues with promoter
December 2	Los Angeles	United States	The Novo	Operational issues with promoter
December 4	Seattle	United States	Showbox SoDo	Operational issues with promoter

== Promotional concerts ==
List of promotional concerts
Title	Dates	Associated album	Venue	City	Ref.
IWonhoYou	September 26–27, 2020	Love Synonym Pt.1: Right for Me	Unknown	Virtual	
WeNeedLove	March 28, 2021	Love Synonym Pt.2: Right for Us	Unknown	Virtual	
We Are Young	November 13–14, 2021	Blue Letter	Yes24 Live Hall	Seoul, South Korea	
Everyday Christmas	December 3, 2022 (Note: Two Everyday Christmas shows were held on the same day, one at 2 p.m. and the other at 7 p.m.)	Bittersweet	Sungshin Women's University WoonJung Green Campus Auditorium	Seoul, South Korea	
—N/a (Note: Untitled series of concerts in the United States)	July 11, 2026	Core	The Venue	Lincoln, California, United States	
—N/a	August 9, 2026	Core	Unknown	Cherokee, North Carolina, United States	
—N/a	August 14, 2026	Core	Unknown	Highland, California, United States	

== Fan meeting tours ==
List of fan meeting tours
Title	Date	Venue	City	Ref.
Ohhoho Trip (Note: Marketed as a "fan concert" for the Tokyo and Bangkok dates)	July 30, 2022 (Note: Two Ohhoho Trip shows were held in Seoul on the same day, one at 2 p.m. and the other at 7 p.m.)	Sejong University Daeyang Hall	Seoul, South Korea	
Ohhoho Trip	September 18, 2022	Ultra Arena	Bangkok, Thailand	
Ohhoho Trip	October 7, 2022	Tokyo International Forum Hall C	Tokyo, Japan	
Ohhoho Trip	October 8, 2022	Tokyo International Forum Hall C	Tokyo, Japan	
Welcome Back, Wenee (Note: Marketed as a "fan party" for the Seoul dates and "fan meetup" for the U.S. dates)	September 14, 2024 (Note: Two Welcome Back, Wenee shows were held in Seoul on the same day, one at 2 p.m. and the other at 6 p.m.)	Ewha Womans University ECC Samsung Hall	Seoul, South Korea	
Welcome Back, Wenee	December 4, 2024	Warehouse Live	Houston, Texas, United States	
Welcome Back, Wenee	December 7, 2024	Outset	Chicago, Illinois, United States	
Welcome Back, Wenee	December 12, 2024	Racket	New York, New York, United States	
Welcome Back, Wenee	December 15, 2024	Showbox	Seattle, Washington, United States	
Welcome Back, Wenee	December 17, 2024	August Hall	San Francisco, California, United States	
Welcome Back, Wenee	December 19, 2024	Regent	Los Angeles, California, United States	

== Festival appearances ==
List of festival appearances
Date	Festival	Venue	City	Performed song(s)	Ref.
July 22, 2021	uClean Youth Culture Concert	Unknown	Virtual	"Open Mind"; "Lost in Paradise"	
October 1, 2021	2021 Seoul International Music Fair	Unknown	Virtual	"Open Mind"; "Blue"	
December 5, 2021	Kim Jang-hoon's Forest Concert	Kwangwoon University Donghae Culture and Arts Center	Seoul, South Korea	—N/a	
March 28, 2022	We All Are One	Unknown	Virtual	"Eye on You"; "Blue"	
July 2, 2022	Uni-Kon Universe Music Festival	SK Olympic Handball Arena	Seoul, South Korea	—N/a	
November 18, 2024	K-Pop Masterz	Palacio de los Deportes	Mexico City, Mexico	"Lose"; "Come Over Tonight"; "Weneed"; "Don't Hesitate"; "Somebody"; "With You"	
December 3, 2024	iHeartRadio Jingle Ball Tour	Dickies Arena	Fort Worth, Texas, United States	"Ain't About You"; "Lose"; "What Would You Do"; "Open Mind"	
December 9, 2024	iHeartRadio Jingle Ball Tour	Allstate Arena	Rosemont, Illinois, United States	"Ain't About You"; "Lose"; "What Would You Do"; "Open Mind"	
December 10, 2024	iHeartRadio Jingle Ball Tour	Little Caesars Arena	Detroit, Michigan, United States	"Ain't About You"; "Lose"; "What Would You Do"; "Open Mind"	
December 21, 2024	iHeartRadio Jingle Ball Tour	Kaseya Center	Miami, Florida, United States	"Ain't About You"; "Lose"; "What Would You Do"; "Open Mind"	
January 18, 2025	1.2.3 Seollal Festival	Lille Grand Palais	Lille, France	"Open Mind"; "Ain't About You"; "What Would You Do"; "Come Over Tonight"; "White Miracle"; "Don't Hesitate"; "Somebody"; "Crazy"; "Weneed"	
August 2, 2026	Water Music Pool Party	Caribbean Bay	Yongin, South Korea	"Don't Wake Me Up!"; "If You Wanna"; "Better Than Me"; "Test Drive"; "Down"	
September 12, 2026	Waterbomb Kaohsiung	Dream Mall	Kaohsiung, Taiwan	"Don't Wake Me Up!"; "If You Wanna"; "Open Mind"; "Better Than Me"; "Test Drive"; "Down"	

== Award show performances ==
List of award show performances
Date	Award show	Venue	City	Performed song(s)	Ref.
December 2, 2021	6th Asia Artist Awards	KBS Arena	Seoul, South Korea	"Lose"; "Open Mind	
December 14, 2024	2024 Unforgettable Gala	The Beverly Hilton	Beverly Hills, California, United States	"Losing You"; "Ain't About You"; "Open Mind"; "What Would You Do"	
May 17, 2026	Asia Star Entertainer Awards 2026	Belluna Dome	Tokorozawa, Saitama, Japan	"If You Wanna"; "Maniac"; "Better Than Me"	

== Televised performances ==
List of televised performances
Date	Program	Performed song(s)	Ref.
September 10, 2020	M Countdown	"Open Mind"	
September 11, 2020	Music Bank	"Open Mind"	
September 12, 2020	Show! Music Core	"Open Mind"	
September 13, 2020	Inkigayo	"Open Mind"	
September 15, 2020	The Show	"Open Mind"	
September 16, 2020	Show Champion	"Open Mind"	
September 20, 2020	Inkigayo	"Open Mind"	
September 25, 2020	MTV Fresh Out Live	"Open Mind"	
February 26, 2021	Music Bank	"Lose"	
February 27, 2021	Show! Music Core	"Lose"	
February 28, 2021	Inkigayo	"Lose"	
March 2, 2021	The Show	"Lose"	
March 3, 2021	Show Champion	"Lose"	
March 5, 2021	Music Bank	"Lose"	
March 6, 2021	Show! Music Core	"Lose"	
March 7, 2021	Inkigayo	"Lose"	
September 17, 2021	Music Bank	"Blue"; "24/7"	
September 19, 2021	Inkigayo	"Blue"; "24/7"	
September 22, 2021	Show Champion	"Blue"; "24/7"	
September 25, 2021	Show! Music Core	"Blue"	
September 28, 2021	The Show	"Blue"; "24/7"	
September 29, 2021	Show Champion	"Blue" (English version)	
October 2, 2021	Show! Music Core	"Blue"	
October 3, 2021	Inkigayo	"Blue"	
October 11, 2021	M Countdown	"Come Over Tonight"	
October 15, 2021	Music Bank	"Come Over Tonight"	
October 16, 2021	Show! Music Core	"Come Over Tonight"	
February 17, 2022	M Countdown	"Eye on You"	
February 20, 2022	Inkigayo	"Eye on You"	
February 22, 2022	The Show	"Eye on You"	
February 23, 2022	Show Champion	"Eye on You"	
February 24, 2022	M Countdown	"Eye on You"	
February 25, 2022	Music Bank	"Eye on You"	
February 26, 2022	Show! Music Core	"Eye on You"	
February 27, 2022	Inkigayo	"Eye on You"	
March 1, 2022	The Show	"Eye on You"	
March 2, 2022	Show Champion	"Eye on You"	
March 3, 2022	M Countdown	"Eye on You"	
March 4, 2022	Music Bank	"Eye on You"	
March 5, 2022	Show! Music Core	"Eye on You"	
March 6, 2022	Inkigayo	"Eye on You"	
March 11, 2022	Music Bank	"Somebody"	
March 12, 2022	Show! Music Core	"Somebody"	
March 13, 2022	Inkigayo	"Somebody"	
June 16, 2022	M Countdown	"Crazy"	
June 17, 2022	Music Bank	"Crazy"	
June 20, 2022	Inkigayo	"Crazy"	
June 25, 2022	Show! Music Core	"Crazy"	
October 16, 2022	Inkigayo	"Don't Regret"	
October 19, 2022	Show Champion	"Don't Regret"	
October 20, 2022	M Countdown	"On & On"	
October 22, 2022	Show! Music Core	"On & On"	
October 23, 2022	Inkigayo	"On & On"	
July 4, 2025	Music Bank	"Better Than Me"	
July 6, 2025	Inkigayo	"Better Than Me"	
November 1, 2025	Show! Music Core	"If You Wanna"	
July 25, 2026	Show! Music Core	"Don't Wake Me Up!"	
July 26, 2026	Inkigayo	"Don't Wake Me Up!"	
August 1, 2026	Show! Music Core	"Don't Wake Me Up!"	
