= On the Way (Wonho song) =

- Standard cover

Single by Wonho
- Language: English; Japanese
- B-side: "Open Mind" (Japanese version)
- Released: October 27, 2021
- Length: 3:27
- Label: Victor
- Composers: Wonho; Enan; Sun Ahn
- Lyricists: Wonho; Enan; Sun Ahn; Laz

Wonho singles chronology
"Blue" (2021)	"On the Way" (2021)	"White Miracle" (2021)

Music video
- "On the Way" on YouTube

"On the Way" (also titled "On the Way ～抱きしめるよ～") is a song recorded by the South Korean singer Wonho. It was released by Victor Entertainment as the singer's first Japanese maxi single, featuring a Japanese version of "Open Mind" as its B-side. The song was composed and arranged by Wonho, Enan, and Sun Ahn, who co-wrote the lyrics with Laz, while the B-side includes additional Japanese lyrics by Show.

The single charted on the Japan Oricon Singles Chart for three weeks, peaking at number 15 and selling 4,114 physical copies. The release of "On the Way" was supported by the Japanese version of "Lose", originally recorded in Korean for Love Synonym Pt.2: Right for Us (2021), marketed as a "pre-debut single".

== Background ==
Following his signing with Highline Entertainment in 2020 after his departure from boy group Monsta X, Wonho began promotional activities in South Korea, with the first part of his EP, Love Synonym Pt.1: Right for Me, which was supported by the single "Open Mind". The second part of the EP, Love Synonym Pt.2: Right for Us, was released alongside its single "Lose". On July 27, 2021, the release of "On the Way" was announced, and a release date of October 27 was unveiled.

== Release and promotion ==
On August 4, 2021, a Japanese version of "Lose", originally recorded for Love Synonym Pt.2: Right for Us (2021), was released as a "pre-debut single". A promotional livestream was held on video sharing site Niconico, with the song's music video being premiered during the livestream. "On the Way" was released on October 27, 2021 by Victor Entertainment. The single was made available on South Korean music platforms on December 6, 2021 by J-Box Entertainment. "On the Way" was the ending theme song for TV Asahi's music show Break Out during November 2021. The song was performed as part of Wonho's first solo concert, We Are Young.

== Composition ==
"On the Way" has been described as a medium-tempo ballad. It was composed and written by Wonho, Enan and Sun Ahn, with additional lyrics by Laz. According to Billboard Japan, the song's lyrics express joy at reuniting with fans and gratitude for their support. The single's B-side, a Japanese-language version of "Open Mind", additionally credits Show for Japanese lyrics.

== Music video ==
A teaser of the music video for "On the Way" was released on October 5, 2021. The full music video was released alongside the single on October 27, and takes place on Jeju Island, South Korea. A karaoke version of the music video was subsequently made available on Joysound karaoke machines on December 18, and remained available for six months.

== Track listing ==
Standard track listing
No.	Title	Lyrics	Music	Length
1.	"On the Way"	Wonho; Enan; Sun Ahn; Laz	Wonho; Enan; Sun Ahn	3:27
2.	"Open Mind" (Japanese version)	Corey "Latif" Williams; David Brook; Bryan Fryzel; Aaron Kleinstub; Wonho; Show	Williams; Brook; Fryzel; Kleinstub	3:10
Total length:				6:37

First press edition DVD
No.	Title	Length
1.	"On the Way" (music video)	3:33
2.	"On the Way" (music video making)	31:15
Total length:		34:48

== Personnel ==
Credits adapted from the CD single's liner notes.

=== Musicians ===
- Wonho – background vocals (1)
- Enan – background vocals (1–2), drums, bass, piano, synthesizer, guitar (1)
- Sun Ahn – background vocals (1–2)

=== Technical ===
- Arkade – mixing (2)
- Dr. Ahn – mixing
- Jeong Eun-kyeong – digital editing (1), recording (2)
- Kim Soo-jung – recording (2)
- Kwon Nam-woo – mastering
- Enan – recording (2)

=== Studios ===
- 821 Sound – mastering
- Ingrid Studios – digital editing (1), recording (2)
- Savage House – recording (2)

== Charts ==
Chart performance
Chart (2021)	Position
Japan (Oricon)	15
Japan Top Single Sales (Billboard Japan)	16

== Release history ==
Release history
Region	Date	Edition	Format	Label	Ref.
Japan	October 27, 2021	Standard	CD single	Victor	
Various	October 27, 2021	Standard	Digital download; streaming	Victor	
Japan	October 27, 2021	First press	CD single + DVD	Victor	
South Korea	December 6, 2021	Standard	Digital download; streaming	J-Box	
