= Syndrome (Wonho album) =

- Digital cover

Studio album by Wonho
- Released: October 31, 2025
- Genre: Pop; R&B
- Length: 27:18
- Language: English; Korean
- Label: Intertwine; Kakao
- Producer: Tushar Apte; John Buchanan; Serban Cazan; Captain Cuts; Enan; Jackson Foote; Joe Kearns; Vaughn Oliver; Johnny Simpson; Tim "One Love" Sommers"; Nico Stadi; The Wavys; Skywalk

Wonho chronology
Bittersweet (2023)	Syndrome (2025)	Core (2026)

Singles from Syndrome
- 1. "Better Than Me" Released: June 27, 2025; 2. "Good Liar" Released: October 3, 2025; 3. "If You Wanna" Released: October 31, 2025

Syndrome is the first solo studio album by the South Korean singer Wonho. It was released on October 31, 2025, by Intertwine Records, and distributed by Kakao Entertainment. The album consists primarily of English-language songs. On Syndrome, Wonho continues his production collaboration with Enan, while also working with other producers including Tushar Apte, One Love, Vaughn Oliver, Captain Cuts, and others.

Syndrome marks Wonho's first release under Intertwine Records following his signing with the label in 2021. The album was preceded by the singles "Better Than Me" and "Good Liar", with "If You Wanna" being released alongside the album. To promote Syndrome, Wonho embarked on the Stay Awake World Tour throughout Europe, Latin America and Asia. Following initial plans of a North American leg, it was eventually cancelled due to "operational issues" and "administrative delays".

The album peaked at number 19 on South Korea's Gaon Album Chart with 12,427 copies sold, remaining on the chart for five non-consecutive weeks. It also reached number 53 on the Gaon Album Monthly Chart for October, with the same sales figure.

== Background ==
After Wonho's departure from Monsta X, Wonho signed with Starship Entertainment's subsidiary, Highline Entertainment, to start his career as a solo artist. On September 4, 2020, he made his solo debut with the mini-album Love Synonym Pt.1: Right for Me, followed by a sequel titled Love Synonym Pt.2: Right for Us released on February 26, 2021. On June 15, 2021, it was announced that Wonho, along with other artists, signed with Intertwine Records with the goal of "helping potential global stars [...] with a soft landing on the U.S. market".

Following the promotions of his 2022 single album Bittersweet, Wonho performed a final concert titled Everyday Christmas on December 3, 2022, before his mandatory military service enlistment on December 5, 2022, as a public service worker. On September 4, 2024, he was discharged and later resumed promotional activities following the release of his first English-language single "What Would You Do" on November 22, 2024, ahead of the North American leg of his Welcome Back, Wenee tour. In an interview with Consequence, when asked about future plans, Wonho said:

Of course plans can still change, but I’m hoping for a new album to come out after my trip to the US. I’m working really hard on it. I’d try to go back to the US after that releases, but in the meantime, I want to spend this winter with the fans. I hope we have a great time when I’m there.

He continued teasing an album throughout 2024, revealing that he had recorded new music in Chicago and hinting at potential to release R&B and EDM-inspired tracks. After initially hinting at a February–March 2025 release date, the album's title was unveiled on September 29, 2025, also confirming an October 31, 2025 release date.

== Composition ==
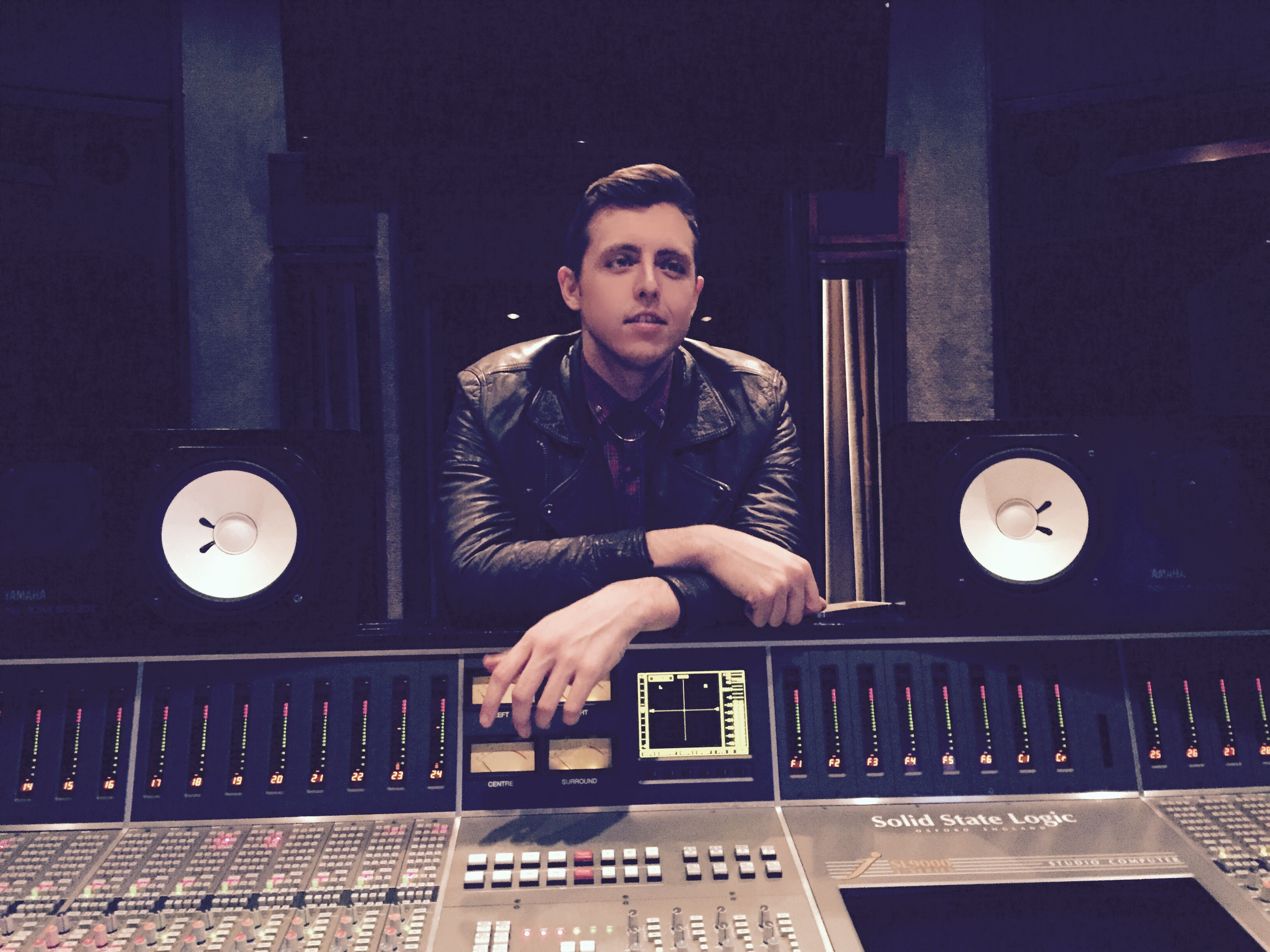
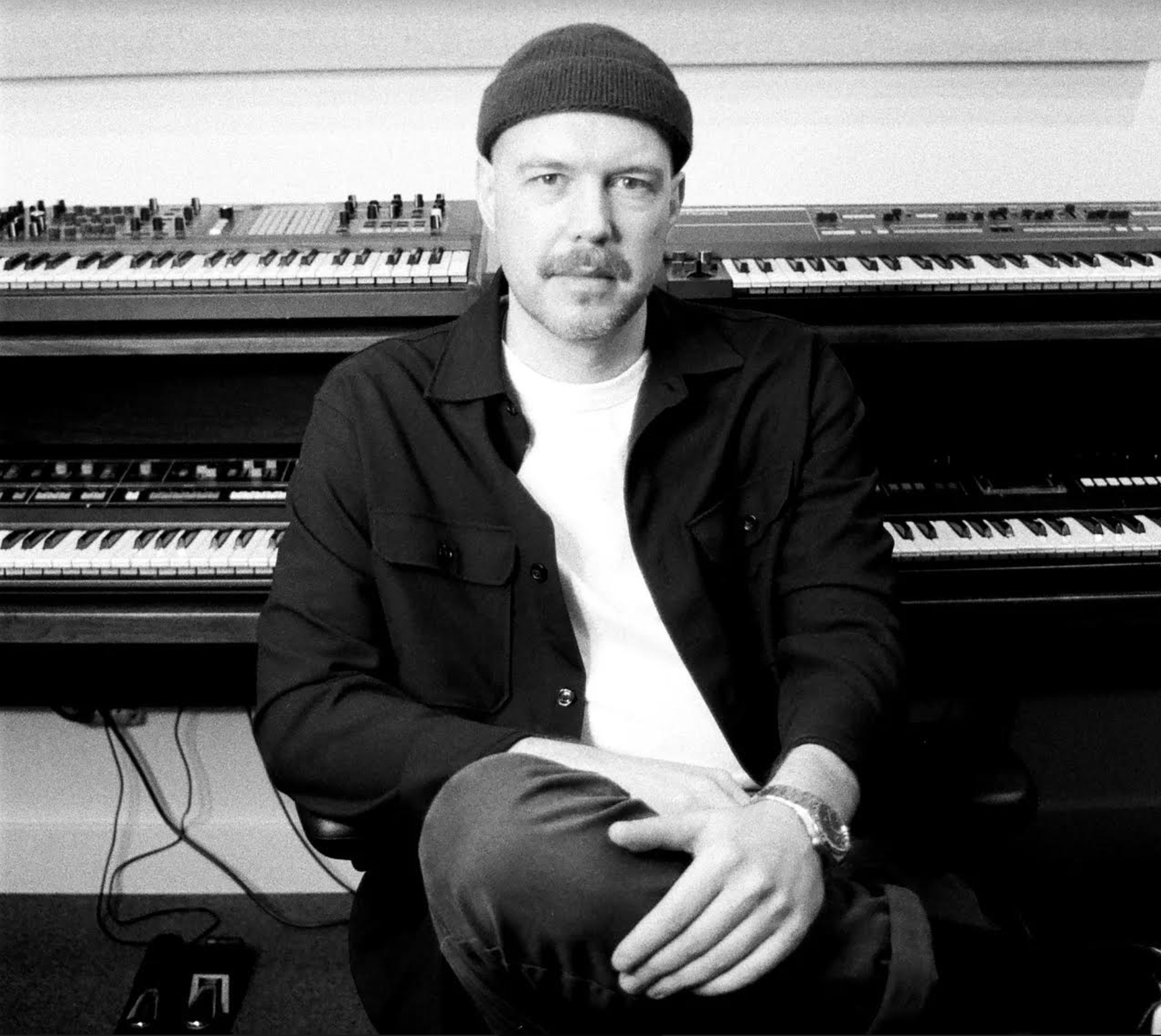
James Abrahart (left; "If You Wanna" and "Beautiful") and Vaughn Oliver (right; "Maniac"), contributors to the album's songwriting.

Syndrome is an English-language album, with Joseph Kocharian of Rolling Stone UK describing it as a "mix of fizzing-yet-airy ballads, chilled dance and silky R&B tracks". The first song in the album, "Fun", is described as a pop track with a "heavy electronic sound". "If You Wanna" features Wonho intentionally lowering his vocal register, in a pop and R&B track. Wonho describes the third track, "DND", as a "do not disturb message to myself when I'm emotionally drained." The Serban Cazan–produced "Scissors" is an R&B track, which compares the wounds of words to scissors. "At the Time" and "Beautiful" are two pop ballads, the former, produced by The Wavys and features both English and Korean lyrics. Wonho described the lyric "매일 걷다 보니 더 멀리 / But as of lately" as a line that "really resonates with me", saying:

To me, it means that if you keep walking every day, before you know it, you’ve come farther than you thought. It reminds me that those quiet, everyday moments were precious, and that all those times have built up to create who I am now.

The seventh track on Syndrome, "On Top of the World", is described as a synth-pop, easy listening and funk-pop song, which Wonho described as expressing "the excitement and freedom of being at your happiest moment," capturing "some of my brightest moments and the sense of freedom that comes with youth." "Good Liar" is described as a song about "the will to protect oneself and move forward amid repeated lies and betrayals." The lyrics of the ninth track, "Maniac", are described as depicting "a fatal relationship that experiences repeated breakups and reunions". The album's closing track, "Better Than Me", is a contemporary pop song, which was compared to early 2000's Western boy bands, such as the Backstreet Boys and NSYNC.

== Title and artwork ==
Syndrome gets its title from "the changing emotions of love that shape us", encompassing romantic love, sexual connection, heartbreak, setting boundaries, and discovering self-worth. Wonho further explained:

It's about the different types of love that we feel and the different changes, or we can say symptoms, that you can go through, [...] There are three types – [connection, heartbreak, and learning self-worth].

The album is complemented with three different visual concepts: Onset, Fever, and Fallout. Wonho explained, "Onset is more of the first spark [...] Fever is when the love gets very intense [...] and Fallout is what's left after all of those emotions happen," illustrating how the album captures the changing "temperatures of love" over time. The album was released in three physical versions, each named after one of these concepts.

== Promotion ==
=== Singles ===
On June 18, 2025, Wonho announced the release of his second English-language single "Better Than Me" as the lead single of his then untitled first studio album. It was later released on June 27. A second single, "Good Liar", was released on October 8. Alongside Syndrome, the third single, "If You Wanna" was released on October 31. Despite an initial ban of the song by the Korean Broadcasting System for being "excessively sexual in content," Wonho performed "If You Wanna" on Music Bank on the same day of its release, beginning promotional activities for the single. Promotions for "If You Wanna" continued on MBC's Show! Music Core and SBS' Inkigayo.

=== Tour ===
In support of "Better Than Me" and Syndrome, Wonho embarked on the Stay Awake World Tour. It began with a Latin American leg on July, and a European leg on September. During these shows, he performed two unreleased songs: "Mala" and "Down". On September 27, 2025, Highline Entertainment announced the third leg of the 2025 Stay Awake World Tour on North America, which was set to begin on Toronto, Ontario at the Queen Elizabeth Theatre on November 14 and finish on Seattle, Washington at Showbox SoDo on December 4. The North American leg was eventually cancelled due to "operational issues" and "administrative delays" by the tour's promoter. In 2026, Wonho held two concerts in Asia: one in Saitama, Japan, and another in Seoul, South Korea.

== Commercial performance ==
Syndrome debuted on the Circle Album Chart at number 19, with 12,427 copies sold, and remained on the chart for five non-consecutive weeks. It also debuted on the Circle Album Monthly Chart at number 53 with the same sales figure, and on the Circle Retail Albums Chart at number 21 with 6,160 copies sold.

== Track listing ==
Credits adapted from Tidal.

Syndrome track listing
No.	Title	Writer(s)	Producer(s)	Length
1.	"Fun"	Tushar Apte; Joe Kearns; Madi Yanofsky	Apte; Kearns	2:27
2.	"If You Wanna"	James Abrahart; Jeremy "Kinetics" Dussolliet; Jackson Foote; Lee Ho-seok; Johnny Simpson; Tim "One Love" Sommers	Simpson; Sommers	2:28
3.	"DND"	Sun Ahn; Lee	Enan	2:34
4.	"Scissors"	Nick Bradley; Serban Cazan; Lee; Lucian Nagy	Cazan	2:49
5.	"At the Time"	Ahn; Jack Brady; Enan; Will Jay; Hannah Kim; Lee; Jordan Roman	The Wavys	3:16
6.	"Beautiful"	Abrahart; Dussolliet; Foote; Lee; Simpson; Sommers	Foote; Sommers	3:10
7.	"On Top of the World"	Daniella Binyamin; Fraser Churchill; Lee; Joona Pietikäinen	Skywalk	2:48
8.	"Good Liar"	John Buchanan; Olivia "Liiv" Cargile; David Charles Fischer; Lee	Buchanan	2:50
9.	"Maniac"	Fischer; Lee; Vaughn Oliver; Nico Stadi	Oliver; Stadi	2:31
10.	"Better Than Me"	Captain Cuts; Fischer; Lee; Boy Matthews	Captain Cuts	2:25
Total length:				27:18

== Personnel ==
Credits adapted from the album's liner notes.

- Wonho – background vocals, recording
- Sun Ahn – vocal direction (1–2, 4–10), background vocals, digital editing (1–2, 4–10), recording
- Tushar Apte – drums, synthesizer programming (1)
- BrotherSu – background vocals (2)
- Serban Cazan – programming (4)
- Nathan Dantzler – mastering (1–9)
- Enan – vocal direction (1–2, 4–10), background vocals, digital editing (1–2, 4–10), all instruments (3), recording
- Koen Heldens – mixing
- Joe Kearns – drums, synthesizer programming (1)
- Randy Merrill – mastering (10)
- The Wavys – programming (5)

== Charts ==
=== Weekly chart ===
Chart (2025)	Position
South Korean Albums (Circle)	19

=== Monthly chart ===
Chart (2025)	Position
South Korean Albums (Circle)	53

== Release history ==
Release history
Region	Date	Format	Label	Ref.
Various	October 31, 2025	CD; digital download; streaming	Intertwine; Kakao	
