= Blue Letter (EP) =

- Digital cover

EP by Wonho
- Released: September 14, 2021
- Studios: Savage House; Wonho's dressing room
- Genre: Pop
- Length: 20:44
- Languages: Korean; English
- Labels: Highline; Kakao

Wonho chronology
Love Synonym Pt.2: Right for Us (2021)	Blue Letter (2021)	Obsession (2022)

Singles from Blue Letter
- 1. "Blue" Released: September 14, 2021

Blue Letter is the second extended play (EP) by the South Korean singer Wonho. It was released on September 14, 2021, by Highline Entertainment under exclusive license to Kakao Entertainment. Wonho was involved in the writing and composition of all tracks in the EP, alongside frequent collaborators Enan and Sun Ahn. Its concept was inspired by Wonho's experiences with depression and the support of those around him and his fans. It received positive reviews from critics, who praised Wonho's vulnerability and described the EP as "refreshing".

Blue Letter is described as a pop music record, with elements of dance and R&B. In support of the EP, "Blue" was released as its sole single and a concert titled We Are Young was held in Seoul, South Korea, in November 2021. He also made several appearances on South Korean music shows, performing the EP's lead single and select tracks. An English-language version of "Blue" is also included in the track listing of Blue Letter.

The EP was released digitally through music download and streaming platforms, alongside a compact disc release in South Korea in three numbered editions. Commercially, the EP peaked at number 5 on South Korea's Circle Album Chart and has sold over 70,000 copies in the country. Internationally, it reached number 86 on the Billboard Japan Top Download Albums chart. The lead single "Blue" charted on digital download charts in both South Korea and the United States.

== Background ==
In 2020, Wonho signed with Highline Entertainment following his departure from boy group Monsta X amid allegations of unpaid debt and drug use; he was later cleared of all charges following a police investigation. That year, he made his solo debut with Love Synonym Pt.1: Right for Me (2020), the first part of his Love Synonym series, which was supported by the single "Open Mind". In 2021, he released the second part of the series, Love Synonym Pt.2: Right for Us, supported by the single "Lose".

In an interview with Radio.com, Wonho revealed that Love Synonym Pt.2: Right for Us would be the final installment of the Love Synonym series. On March 25, he said he was working on his next album with frequent collaborator and producer Enan. During his online concert WeNeedLove, held on March 28, he again mentioned working on a new album, hinting at a summer release. The title of Blue Letter was unveiled on August 19, and the EP was released on September 14, alongside its single "Blue".

== Development ==
=== Recording and writing ===
Wonho revealed that he struggled during the recording of Blue Letter, explaining that his throat was not in optimal condition and that he recorded the EP in his dressing room while using multiple humidifiers. Wonho attributes "No Text No Call" as the song that helped consolidate the concept for Blue Letter, adding that it was the first track written for the EP. During the promotions of his single album Facade (2022), Wonho described Blue Letter as being dedicated to those who supported him during difficult periods and made to provide consolation to listeners going through similar situations, in contrast to his more recent releases. At Wonho's request, BrotherSu wrote the Korean lyrics for "Blue" in one day. "24/7" was originally recorded for Wonho's first mini album, Love Synonym Pt.1: Right for Me, but was saved for release as a Christmas song. It was later reworked for its inclusion on Blue Letter.

=== Concept and title ===
In an interview with Masayuki Furuya for Billboard Japan, Wonho explained that the concept of Blue Letter was inspired by his experiences with depression and the support he received from those around him and his fans. The title of Blue Letter comes from the English expression "feeling blue", commonly associated with sadness or depression. He further explained in an interview with NME that he wanted to reinterpret the meaning of the phrase to convey a sense of "feeling loved", thereby giving it a more positive connotation. He attributed the "letter" part of the title to the EP being an honest letter, containing the emotions, time, and experiences he had felt in the past.

== Release and promotion ==
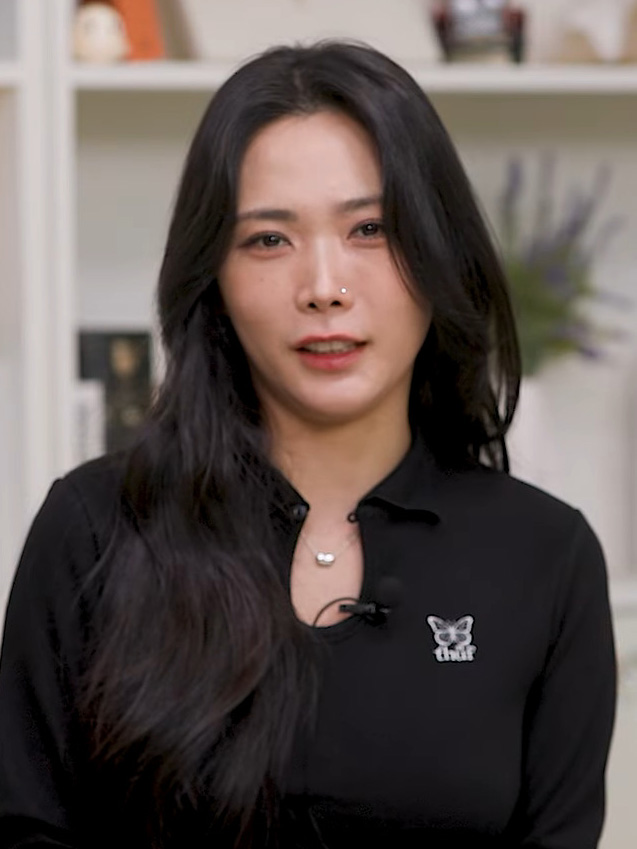
Honey J (pictured) appeared alongside Wonho during performances of "Come Over Tonight" on South Korean music shows.

On August 20, 2021, a teaser image announcing the release of Wonho's second EP, Blue Letter, was posted by Highline Entertainment on his social media channels. On August 22, Wonho appeared on Idol's Online Music Talk Show on Melon Station, an original audio content service by streaming platform Melon, to promote Blue Letter. On August 28, a promotional schedule revealing new content prior to the album's release was unveiled. The EP's tracklist was revealed on September 7, announcing "Blue" as its title track. Prior to the release of Blue Letter, two teasers for the "Blue" music video were published on Wonho's YouTube channel.

The release of Blue Letter was supported by its lead single, "Blue", which was released alongside the EP, with a music video for the song being released the same day. The EP was released in three numbered compact disc (CD) editions. Choreography videos of "Blue" and "Come Over Tonight" were released on Wonho's YouTube channel from September–October. Special music videos filmed by Wonho for "Come Over Tonight", "24/7", "No Text No Call", and the English version of "Blue" were released throughout 2023–2024.

=== Televised appearances ===
Wonho began promoting Blue Letter on South Korean music programs on September 17, 2021, performing "Blue" and "24/7" on KBS' Music Bank for the first time. The English version of "Blue" had its live debut on Show Champion, during its September 29 broadcast. A televised appearance at the 2021 Seoul International Music Fair on SBS M took place on October 1, in which Wonho performed "Open Mind" and "Blue".

On October 11, it was reported that Wonho would perform "Come Over Tonight" on music shows, beginning on M Countdown on October 14. The performances featured Honey J, the leader of street dance crew HolyBang, who appeared on Mnet's Street Woman Fighter.

=== Promotional concert ===
We Are Young
- Concert by Wonho
- Location: Seoul
- Venue: Yes24 Live Hall
- Associated album: Blue Letter
- Start date: November 13, 2021
- End date: November 14, 2021
- No. of shows: 2
- Supporting acts: Soyou; Yoo Seung-woo

A promotional concert for Blue Letter, titled We Are Young, was announced by Highline Entertainment on October 13, 2021. Two shows took place between November 13 and 14 at the Yes24 Live Hall in Seoul, South Korea. It marked his first in-person concert, following a series of online concerts being held due to the COVID-19 pandemic.

Singers Soyou and Yoo Seung-woo participated in the concert as guest performers. During the November 14 show, Wonho temporarily stopped performing after experiencing hyperventilation. He received medical attention on site, after which the concert resumed.

== Composition ==
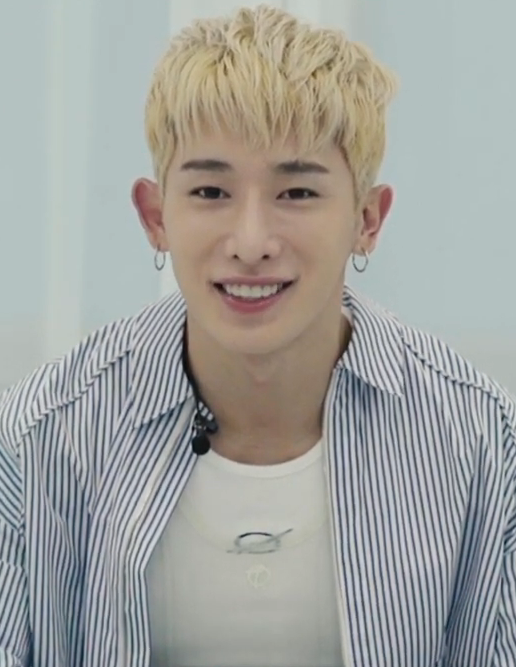
Wonho (pictured) co-wrote all songs on Blue Letter.

Musically, Blue Letter is a pop EP that incorporates elements of dance and R&B. Wonho participated in writing and composing for all songs in the EP. The first track of Blue Letter, "Intro: Seasons and Patterns", is a two-minute instrumental track built around a minimal motif of two three-note phrases. Halfway through the song, a beat and strings are introduced. Nearing the end, a key change occurs, bringing a brighter tone to the track.

"Blue", the EP's lead single, is a dance-pop track, with lyrics about melancholy represented through the color blue. Its lyrics also address feelings of isolation during the COVID-19 pandemic, while conveying a message of hope. The EP includes two versions of the song: a Korean version written by BrotherSu, and an English version. "No Text No Call" is a guitar-centric track about "losing a lover without warning". Its lyrics are entirely in English. "Come Over Tonight" features 808 bass, synth and vocoder elements, with a melody reminiscent of doo-wop. In the EDM track, "24/7", Wonho sings about staying beside someone "24 hours a day, 7 days a week." The EP's closer, "Stranger", only features an acoustic guitar and Wonho's vocals.

== Critical reception ==
Professional ratings
Review scores
Source	Rating
PopMatters	7/10
NME	4/5 stars

In a review for PopMatters, Ana Clara Ribeiro rated Blue Letter 7 out of 10, describing the EP as a "refreshing and enjoyable work", noting that despite it exploring several genres, it does not sound "as busy as its genre classifications make it seem." Ribeiro also praised Wonho's vulnerability, calling it a "genuine element to the simplicity of the love songs". Writing for NME, Rhian Daly rated the EP four out of five stars, describing it as a "soul-stirring, sensitive release", while complimenting the results of Wonho's songwriting and production contributions as "impressive", highlighting "Blue" as a stand-out, calling it an "instant radio smash in a just world".

Writing for TV Daily, Kim Ji-ha compared the EP to Wonho's previous projects, noting its "different vibe", while Kim Han-gil and Park Sang-hoo described it as "charming" and "refreshing", respectively. Park added that the EP would have benefitted from a release in the middle of summer.

== Commercial performance ==
Blue Letter debuted at number five on the Circle Album Chart and remained on the chart for a total of nine non-consecutive weeks. (Note: Attributed to multiple references:) It also appeared on the monthly chart for three consecutive months. (Note: Attributed to multiple references:) As of November 2021, the EP had sold 78,758 copies domestically. On the Circle Retail Album Chart, the EP debuted at number six, holding its peak position for a second week and charting for seven consecutive weeks in total. (Note: Attributed to multiple references:) It additionally debuted at number 11 on the monthly retail chart, remaining for two consecutive months. Internationally, Blue Letter charted for one week on the Billboard Japan Top Download Albums chart at number 86.

The EP's title track, "Blue", debuted at number 30 on the Circle Download Chart, rising to a peak of number 22 the following week before exiting the chart. It also appeared on the monthly download chart at number 58. Additionally, the song charted for one week on the Circle BGM Chart at number 67. It also debuted at number 14 on the Billboard World Digital Song Sales chart.

== Track listing ==
Blue Letter track listing
No.	Title	Lyrics	Music	Arrangement	Length
1.	"Intro: Seasons and Patterns" (Intro: 시간과 잡화점의 무늬; Intro: sigangwa japhwajeomui munui)		Wonho; Enan	Wonho; Enan	2:06
2.	"Blue"	Wonho; BrotherSu; Enan; Sun Ahn	Wonho; Enan; Sun Ahn	Wonho; Enan; Sun Ahn	3:09
3.	"No Text No Call"	Wonho; Savage House Gang; Sun Ahn	Wonho; Savage House Gang; Sun Ahn	Wonho; Savage House Gang; Sun Ahn	3:13
4.	"Come Over Tonight"	Wonho; Savage House Gang; Sun Ahn	Wonho; Savage House Gang; Sun Ahn; Oshimaxx	Wonho; Savage House Gang; Sun Ahn; Oshimaxx	3:10
5.	"24/7"	Wonho; Savage House Gang; Sun Ahn	Wonho; Savage House Gang; Sun Ahn	Wonho; Savage House Gang; Sun Ahn	2:59
6.	"Stranger"	Wonho; Enan; Sun Ahn	Wonho; Enan; Sun Ahn	Wonho; Enan; Sun Ahn	2:56
7.	"Blue" (English version)	Wonho; Enan; Sun Ahn	Wonho; Enan; Sun Ahn	Wonho; Enan; Sun Ahn	2:56
Total length:					20:44

== Personnel ==
The credits were adapted from the EP's liner notes.

=== Musicians ===
- Wonho – backing vocals (tracks 2–7)
- Enan – drums (1–5, 7), bass (1, 3–5), percussion (1–2, 7), strings (1), synthesizer (1–5, 7), backing vocals (2–7), pad (6)
- Bang Won-sik – drums, bass, piano, synthesizer (3–5)
- Bang Yeong-sik – drums, bass, piano, synthesizer (3–5)
- Jang Yeong-jun – piano (1)
- Kang Ji-hoon – bass (2)
- Young Cho – guitar (2–3, 6–7)
- Oshimaxx – guitar (4)

=== Technical ===
- Enan – mixing (1), recording (2–7)
- Dr. Ahn – mixing (2–4, 7)
- Yoon Won-kwon – mixing (5)
- Bottle God – mixing (6)
- Kwon Nam-woo – mastering
- Jeong Eun-kyeong – digital editing (2–7)

=== Studios ===
- Savage House – recording
- In Grid – digital editing
- DDeepKick – mixing
- Zone 582 – mixing
- 821 Sound – mastering

== Charts ==
=== Weekly charts ===
Weekly chart performance
Chart (2021)	Position
South Korean Albums (Circle)	5
Japan Top Download Albums (Billboard Japan)	86

=== Monthly chart ===
Monthly chart performance
Chart (2021)	Position
South Korean Albums (Circle)	9

== Release history ==
Release dates and formats
Region	Date	Format	Label	Ref.
South Korea	September 14, 2021	CD	Highline	
Various	September 14, 2021	Music download; streaming	Highline; Kakao	
