= Last Dance ((G)I-dle song) =

2021 Promotional single by (G)I-dle

"Last Dance"

Promotional single by (G)I-dle
- Language: Korean
- Released: April 29, 2021
- Genre: K-pop; deep house; pop
- Length: 3:04
- Label: Universe; Warner Music
- Songwriter(s): Kriz; Soyeon
- Producer(s): GroovyRoom

Music video
- "Last Dance" on YouTube

"Last Dance" is a song by South Korean girl group (G)I-dle produced by GroovyRoom and written by Kriz and Soyeon, released on April 29, 2021, as the fourth promotional single through Universe, a global fandom platform created by international video game developer, NCSoft.

== Background ==
In November 2020, NCSoft and its subsidiary Klap announced that they will release the K-pop entertainment app Universe, an all-in-one platform that allows global fans to enjoy various online and offline fandom activities on mobile, combining the latest IT technologies such as Artificial Intelligence (AI). On November 16, (G)I-dle was the fifth artist to join the platform. The app was launched on January 28, 2021.

On April 19, 2021, Universe announced that they have decided to release "Last Dance (Prod. GroovyRoom)" without Soojin following her, at the time, temporary hiatus from the group which was announced in early March.

"(G)I-dle finished recording "Last Dance (Prod. GroovyRoom)", making the music video, and creating additional content in February, and we had planned to release them at the end of April. However, an issue related to (G)I-dle's Soojin occurred in March, and the group is currently working as a five-member group. Universe discussed with (G)I-dle's agency Cube Entertainment about the song and music video, and considering the contractual relationship with distributors and partners and both tangible and intangible losses, we decided that it would be difficult to re-produce everything again. Therefore, we have decided to adjust the existing structure."

— Universe announcing the song released by (G)I-dle's five active members,

The statement concluded that the song's composition and lyrics have been modified. Pictorial, making-of video and music video was also re-edited and will centre around the remaining members. The song has since become their first release as a quintet following the announcement of Soojin's permanent departure from the group on August 14, however, she can be seen in the music video.

(G)I-dle became the fourth act to participate in the Universe Music series after Iz*One, Sumi Jo and Rain, and Park Ji-hoon.

== Music and lyrics ==
"Last Dance" is a deep house pop song that provides fun listening with chic and powerful vocals and rap. The song was produced by hip-hop producer GroovyRoom and written by the leader of (G)I-dle, Soyeon and multi-talented female singer-songwriter Kriz with lyrics suitable for the song concept of dark witch. The song has the beats per minute of 116, is in the key D major and has a duration of 3:04.

== Promotion ==
On April 20, Universe released the cover image of the song. The same day, a promotional schedule for it was posted on the Universe's social media accounts. Concept photos for the song were released on April 21 and 22. In the pictures, the five members wore unique crowns which exude dark charisma yet dreamy charms. The next day, a prologue film entitled The Witch Queen was released and it features the group members who have transformed into witches wandering the cursed forest in the dark to seek out the hidden queen. At the end of the video, the witches face a deer that glows brightly, and the fairy tale video ends.

== Credits and personnel ==
Credits are adapted from Tidal.

=== Song credits ===
- (G)I-dle – vocals
  - Soyeon – producing, songwriting, rap arrangement
- GroovyRoom – producing, record engineering, instruments
- Kriz – songwriting

=== Visual credits ===
- Illumin – music video director

== Music video ==
Prior to its release, the song was accompanied by two music video teasers released on April 26 and 27, respectively. The first teaser presents a reversal charm with a black and white concept. (G)I-dle exudes mystical charm with a noble, pure white dress while showing dark charisma with intense black costumes in a fantastical forest brimming with what seems to be a swarm of fireflies. At the end of the video, the members are seen gazing at a mysterious sparkling sphere. The second teaser features the group performing the sword dance and at the end of the video, a short passage with a highlight along with the signature sound of GroovyRoom. The official music video was released on the Universe app on April 29 and a preview of the video was released on YouTube the same day. Directed by Illumin, it features the group wandering through a dense forest in the middle of the night while following a mysterious compass. The music video also features scenes of the individual members in a dimly lit laboratory filled with strange experiments. The video was (G)I-dle’s last music video as a sextet, before Soojin’s departure from the group in August 2021.

== Accolades ==
Awards
Year	Organization	Category	Result	Ref.
2021	Asian Pop Music Awards	Best Arranger (Overseas)	Nominated	

== Charts ==
Chart (2021)	Peak position
South Korea (Gaon)	142
US World Digital Song Sales (Billboard)	16

== Release history ==
Region	Date	Format	Distributor
Various	April 29, 2021	Digital download; streaming	Universe; Warner Music
