= EGO (Q ARE EP) =

2024 EP by Q_ARE

EP by Q ARE
- Released: December 16, 2024
- Genre: Pop
- Length: 14:00
- Label: Q_ARE Records

EGO is the first EP by Chilean boy band Q ARE. It was released independently on December 16, 2024 by Q_ARE Records.

== Background and development ==
EGO is a bilingual track that combines English and Spanish lyrics. About this, member Aiden said, “Spanish is very complex and you can construct beautiful phrases, while English is more interpretative, one word can have several meanings. So combining both languages can make a song have many layers and meanings.”

== Promotion ==
There was no official tv or radio promotion for this EP. The only performance of EGO was on NTV Chile’s “Efecto N”, although no official video has been uploaded — a reupload of the stream exists on TikTok. The band instead promoted through their social media accounts, uploading dance trends.

== Singles and music videos ==
Single	Release date	Music video location	Director & staff
EGO	December 15, 2024	Unknown	Director: Chiporro; Stylist: Sico / Vicente Rojas; Choreographers: Fabi, Bin, Jamin, Sico

== Track listing ==
All tracks are written by Benjamin Elias Labarca.

No.	Title	Writer(s)	Length
1.	"Intro: Be Myself"	Benjamin Elias Labarca, Sebastian Andres Soto	0:32
2.	"EGO"	Labarca, Soto	3:24
3.	"Make It Right"	Labarca, Soto	2:54
4.	"Bass"	Labarca	2:50
5.	"My Way"	Labarca, Mauricio Alexander Jamarillo	3:54
Total length:			14:00
