= Don't Hesitate (song) =

Promotional single by Wonho
- Language: Korean; English
- Released: August 19, 2022
- Genre: Dance
- Length: 3:23
- Label: Klap
- Composers: Enan; Knave; Wonho
- Lyricists: Enan; Knave; Wonho

Wonho promotional singles chronology
"Ain't About You" (2021)	"Don't Hesitate" (2022)

"Don't Hesitate" (stylized in sentence case) is a song recorded by the South Korean singer Wonho, released as a promotional single for the South Korean platform Universe, as part of their Universe Music series. The dance song was released on August 19, 2022 through Klap Entertainment under exclusive license to Genie Music Corporation, and was written by Enan, Knave and Wonho.

== Background ==
On July 12, 2021, NCSoft and Klap announced Wonho, alongside girl group Weki Meki would join the mobile app and web platform Universe on July 19. Wonho was also part of the lineup for the 2022 Uni-Kon Music Festival, held by NCSoft and Klap, featuring artists featured on the platform. On August 13, 2022, it was announced Wonho would release the song "Don't Hesitate" as a collaboration with Universe.

== Composition ==
"Don't Hesitate" is described as a dance song, composed by Knave, Enan and Wonho, and arranged by the latter two. The song's lyrics center on moving toward a new space and time without hesitation through the dark passage of reality. Musically, it opens with a guitar instrumental before building up with layered drum beats. The chorus instrumental incorporates synthesizers, bass, and vocal samples created from Wonho's lead vocals.

== Promotion ==
Before the release of "Don't Hesitate", a schedule was posted on the Universe app, announcing the release of concept images, videos and a music video teaser on August 14, 16 and 17, 2022, respectively. The music video for the song was released simultaneously with the song. As part of its promotion, the song was featured as part of Universe's "Universe Challenge" social media campaign.

== Live performances ==
"Don't Hesitate" was part of the set list on Wonho's Ohhoho Trip fan concert in Tokyo, Japan. He also performed the song in Seoul, South Korea, during his Everyday Christmas concert on December 3, 2022. The song was also included on the set lists for his appearances at K-pop Masterz in Mexico City, Mexico, and the 1.2.3 Seollal After Party in France.

== Credits and personnel ==
Credits adapted from the Korea Music Copyright Association and Apple Music

- Wonho – vocals, programming, arranger, composer, lyrics
- Enan – composer, arranger, lyrics
- Knave – lyrics, composer

== Release history ==
Release dates and formats
Region	Date	Format	Label	Ref.
Various	August 19, 2022	Digital download; streaming	Klap	
