= Aqross =

Chilean boy band

- Origin: Santiago, Chile
- Genres: Latin pop; pop
- Years active: 2024–present
- Labels: Sony Music Chile; BZR Music
- Publisher: Altafonte Chile (distributor)
- Members: Jamin; J; Seba; Bin; Aiden; Fabi
- Past members: Sico
- Website: qniverse.cl

Aqross (previously known as Q Are) is a Chilean boy band formed through the reality program QR Project in 2023. The group consists of Jamin, J, Seba, Bin, Aiden and Fabi. They debuted on January 22, 2024, with the single Try Again.

Drawing inspiration from K-pop, Latin pop, and Western boy bands, Aqross has released multiple singles and performed at music festivals, television programs, and live events throughout Chile.

== Name ==
=== Q Are ===
Q Are is pronounced as "QR". In an interview with FMDos, member Fabi stated that the group originally considered using the name of their docu-reality series, QR Project, but later dropped "Project" after finalizing the members.

=== Aqross ===
AQROSS's logo after name change

Due to a legal dispute, the group had to change their name to Aqross. A play on the word "across", the members decided to keep the "Q" that had been synonymously known with the group and fandom. In an interview with LaJunta+, Aiden revealed that between December 2025–January 2026, "somebody had started to register the name Q Are, which limited us in doing certain things".

== History ==
=== Pre-debut ===
Aiden and Jamin met while participating in K-pop cover events in Santiago. They later began collaborating and met Bin. Around the same time, Fabi was also creating BTS dance covers on social media. Aiden and Fabi had previously known each other but lost contact. When auditions began in early 2023, Bin sent the audition flyer to Aiden and Jamin through Instagram. During the in-person auditions, Aiden and Fabi reconnected with each other.

=== 2023: QR Project ===
Q Are was formed through the docu-reality series QR Project, created as a platform to select the members of the group. In the series, Alex, a music producer under Online Beat Production, organized an online casting call. Twenty contestants were selected to participate and showcase their talents, while ten contestants were eliminated. The remaining contestants underwent vocal and dance training before the final seven members were selected.

=== 2024: Debut and rising popularity ===
On January 8, 2024, Q Are began releasing individual member photos on their official Instagram account to promote their debut single, "Try Again". Seba was the first member revealed, followed by Fabi on January 9, Bin on January 10, Aiden on January 11, and Jamin on January 15. On January 22, 2024, Q_ARE released their debut single, "Try Again".

On June 7, 2024, Q Are performed "Try Again" on TVN's Efecto N.

On December 16, 2024, Q Are released their second single, "Ego", alongside its music video.

On February 27, 2025, Q Are and Sico released statements regarding Sico's departure from the group and the future of Q Are.

=== 2025: National and international recognition ===
On May 29, 2025, Q Are released their single "Last Moon" on digital platforms. Through their official Instagram account, Q Are announced their participation at Santiago Pride 2025.

On July 11, 2025, K-pop creative agency Monday Morning Lab announced that Q Are would be the opening act for Wonho's Stay Awake tour stop in Santiago, Chile, the following night. In an interview with FrontRowLive, Aiden stated that the production team behind Wonho's tour had offered Q Are the opening act position weeks earlier, with approval from both parties finalized two days before the performance.

On August 3, 2025, the group uploaded a teaser video to their official Instagram account. The teaser showed a shovel being dragged across dirt and gravel by a person wearing black boots, followed by a black screen displaying the group's name in white. On August 5, another teaser featuring close-ups of the members was released, accompanied by the caption "¿XX/XX/XXXX?". On August 14, Q Are released "Pala", whose title refers to the Spanish word for "shovel". The song surpassed 1.2 million streams on Spotify following its release and appeared on music charts internationally.

=== 2026: Rebrand to Aqross ===
Q Are kicked off 2026 with a festival performance in La Serena, Chile. They were chosen as the openers of Coke Studio, a music festival sponsored by Coca-Cola Chile to promote Chilean music.

On January 21, Q Are uploaded a "live session" video to their official YouTube channel to celebrate their 2nd year anniversary as a group. In the video, the group performs acoustic covers of their hit singles "Last Moon", "1313", and their debut song "Try Again". In this video, their group's manager surprises them with a YouTube Silver Play Button for surpassing 100K subscribers.

On January 28, it was announced that Q Are signed an exclusive contract with BZR Music, a Chilean record label and distributor.

On January 29, Q Are became the face of Marinela Chile's Valentine's Day campaign.

On February 5, Q Are uploaded a teaser Reels to their official Instagram account. The teaser showed a cocktail drink on a table in a tropical-style decor setting while a hand reaches out to grab the drink, while the caption read "X/XX/XXXX". Two days later, on February 7, they announced the release of a brand new single titled, "Hwai" — a play on words on Hawaii. The single release was set for February 12. On February 12, "Hwai" was released on all streaming platforms alongside its music video on their official YouTube channel.

On February 14, Lollapalooza Chile announced via their official Instagram, that Q Are will headline their special diversity stage titled "Lolla Love 2026".

On February 20, Q Are were special guests at the Gala Festival of Viña Del Mar, walking the red carpet and igniting social media virality.

On April 22, Q Are uploaded a video to their social media platforms with the caption: "The regressive account has started, new era. 29" Fans began speculating online about an album or new single announcement, with "29" either a title or release date. With multiple cryptic uploads referencing the number 29, it was determined that it would be an announcement date. On April 29, a video was uploaded to their official Instagram account with the caption "This is only the beginning. Sign up. www.qniverse.cl". The link takes fans to their official site where they can sign up for the official fan club "Qniverse". As for the video, it shows Q Are atop a high-rise building in all black clothing, while a black screen with white texts reads "1/3".

On May 5, Q Are uploaded a reel to their official Instagram, announcing their first solo concert scheduled for May 17 at Teatro La Cúpula de Parque O'Higgins. Alongside their first solo show, the group will also preview their upcoming single titled "Fú!" On May 7, pre-sale tickets for their show were sold out within 25 minutes. Due to immense interest, a second show was added to be held the same evening.

On June 10, the official website was updated to include a tour "announcement" with four cities in Chile that include Temuco, Concepcion, Santiago and Viña Del Mar. Immediately, the site was updated to four international cities that include Berlin, Paris, Mexico City and Lima, instead. This sudden changed, lead fans to believe it was an accidental leak. At 6:30pm, Chile time, Q Are uploaded a tour announcement video to their official social media pages. Officially, the "Fú! Tour", will begin in August with only four dates.

On September 21, the group began a livestream on their official Instagram announcing a sudden and possible future group name change. The present members Jota, Fabi, Jamin, Seba and Aiden — talked about a sudden future group name change due to legal actions against them. Aiden stated, "Effectively, Q Are won't be able to be Q Are anymore." A more official statement will be announced soon, per the group. On September 27, the group uploaded a release schedule for their upcoming album to their official Instagram. Within the schedule, their new group name is scheduled to be revealed on September 28th, along with a pre-save link to, SCL, the upcoming album.

On September 28, Q Are officially changed their name to Aqross. Member Jamin stated, "We are super excited to finally present a new group identity, after everything that's happened."

On September 29, Sony Music Chile announced Aqross had officially been signed to the label.

On October 1st, Aqross released their first album SCL and music video for "Turbulencia", simultaneously.

== Members ==
=== Current members ===
- J
- Aiden
- Fabi
- Bin
- Seba
- Jamin

=== Former member ===
- Sico

== Artistry ==
In an interview with Los40 Chile's Mood Corea podcast, they stated that although they take inspiration from K-Pop idol groups, they would categorize themselves as Latin pop. They take influences from western boy bands such as Backstreet Boys, One Direction and *NSYNC as well as K-Pop groups like BTS and Stray Kids Most notably, member Aiden is highly influenced by Michael Jackson, having two tattoos honoring the King of Pop. With the rising success of Q Are, many Chilean fans have coined the term "ChisPop", to categorize their genre of music. Taken from the term "pop Chileno" or "Chilean pop" in English. Not to be confused with the Chilean snack, Chispop.

== Tours and performances ==
=== Headlining tours and shows ===
==== Headlining tours ====
- Fú Tour (2026)

FÚ Tour 2026
Date	City	Country	Venue
August 1	Concepcion	Chile	Espacio Marina
August 2	Temuco	Chile	Parque Arena Temuco
August 9	Peñalolén	Chile	Centro Cultural Chimkowe
August 22	Viña del Mar	Chile	Centro de Eventos Sporting Club

==== Solo shows ====
Single Release Show (2026)
Date	City	Country	Venue	Ref.
May 17 (3pm)	Santiago	Chile	La Cúpula Parque O'Higgins	
May 17 (7pm)	Santiago	Chile	La Cúpula Parque O'Higgins	

=== Opening act performances ===
- Wonho – Stay Awake World Tour (2025)

=== TV performances ===
2024
Date	City	Country	TV Program	Performed song(s)	Ref.
June 7, 2024	Santiago	Chile	Efecto N	"Try Again"	
2025
Date	City	Country	TV Program	Performed song(s)	Ref.
July 20, 2025	Santiago	Chile	Efecto N	"Last Moon"	
October 24, 2025	Santiago	Chile	Efecto N	"Last Moon"; "Pala"	
October 25, 2025	Santiago	Chile	Tú Gira Crush	"Last Moon"; "Pala"	
November 19, 2025	Santiago	Chile	Hay Que Decirlo!	"1313"; "Pala"	
November 20, 2025	Santiago	Chile	Mi Nombre Es 2	"Last Moon"; "1313"; "Pala"	
November 28, 2025	Santiago	Chile	Teletón Chile 2025	"1313"; "Pala"; "Cake Pop"	
December 2, 2025	Santiago	Chile	Premios Todo Mejora 2025	"1313"; "Pala"; "Cake Pop"	
2026
Date	City	Country	TV Program	Performed song(s)	Ref.
May 13, 2026	Santiago	Chile	Efecto N	"Pala"; "1313"	
May 22, 2026	Santiago	Chile	El Medio Día	"Fú"; "Pala"; "Cake Pop"; "Ego"	

=== Festivals and events ===
2024
Date	City	Country	Festival/Event	Venue	Ref.
May 21	Santiago	Chile	K-Kombat	Teatro Comunitario Novedades	
June 22	Santiago	Chile	K-Pop Lux II	Sala Ómnium	
Unknown	Santiago	Chile	Comic-Con Chile 2024	Espacio Riesco	
November 17	Santiago	Chile	FestiGame 2024	Estadio Nacional	
December 22	Santiago	Chile	KC Dance Studio Gala 2024	Centro Cultural Vicente Bianchi	
2025
Date	City	Country	Festival/Event	Venue	Ref.
April 5	Quilpué	Chile	Korea Pop!	Plaza Arturo Prat	
April 12	Santiago	Chile	Chingu Expo	Espacio Vicente Valdés	
May 3	Quilpué	Chile	Korea Pop!	Plaza Arturo Prat	
June 21	Santiago	Chile	Santiago Pride	Plaza Los Héroes	
September 6	Quilpue	Chile	Korea Pop!	Plaza Arturo Prat	
September 24	Santiago	Chile	Atrévete Magazine 3rd Issue Launch Party	W Hotel Santiago	
September 27	Santiago	Chile	GAP Chile x Better In Denim	CicloRecreoVia Provudencia	
October 3	Santiago	Chile	ExpoGame Chile 2025	Estación Mapocho	
October 4	Valparaíso	Chile	Japan Geeks	Estadio Ítalo Composto	
October 11	Providencia	Chile	K-Pop Nation	Teatro Oriente	
October 12	Valparaíso	Chile	Feria Tomodachi: Yokai Fest	Parque Cultural de Valparaíso	
October 25	Viña del Mar	Chile	Monja Palooza	Colegio Sagrados Corazones Monjas Francesas	
October 31	Santiago	Chile	Fun Fest HappyLand - "1313" Single Launch Party	HappyLand Cenco Costanera	
November 1	Santiago	Chile	Server: Cunt Festa Halloween Edition	Teatro Roma	
November 4	Arica	Chile	Gira Teletón Chile 2025	Explanada General San Martín	
November 5	Iquique	Chile	Gira Teletón Chile 2025	Plaza 21 de Mayo	
November 23	Brasilia	Brazil	BNB Fest 2025	Worlld Brasilia	
November 29	Santiago	Chile	Teletón Chile 2025	Estadio Nacional	
December 5	Santiago	Chile	CorpoGala 2025	Unknown	
December 6	Pucón	Chile	Multiversus Vol.2	Universidad de La Frontera	
December 20	Rancagua	Chile	Guerreras K-Pop!	Gran Arena Monticello	
2026
Date	City	Country	Festival/Event	Venue	Ref.
January 10	La Serena	Chile	Coke Studio	Faro Monumental	
January 30	Ñuñoa	Chile	Late Ñuñoa 2026	Casa de la Cultura Ñuñoa	
February 8	Calbuco	Chile	Vive Calbuco 2026	Parque Municipal Rubén Cardenas Gomez	
February 21	Viña del Mar	Chile	Coke Studio	Valparaiso Sporting	
February 28	Las Condes	Chile	Miniso Blind Box	Miniso Mall Plaza Los Dominicos	
March 1	Tocopilla	Chile	Cierre del Verano Familiar 2026	Playa Artificial El Salitre	
March 14	Santiago	Chile	Lolla Love 2026	Parque O'Higgins	

== Discography ==
=== Extended plays ===
Title	Details	Track listing	Ref.
Ego	Released: December 16, 2024; Label: Q Are Records; Formats: Digital, streaming	1. Intro: Be Myself; 2. Ego; 3. Make It Right; 4. Bass; 5. My Way	

=== Studio Albums ===
Title	Details	Tracklisting	Ref.
SCL	Released: October 1, 2026; Label: Sony Music Chile; Formats: Digital, streaming	1. Quedabien; 2. BesitoYChao (featuring Princesa Alba); 3. Fú!; 4. Kliché (featuring Kidd Voodoo); 5. Turbulencia; 6. Contigo Quiero Bailar; 7. Ahogo; 8. H3artbeat; 9. Fools; 10. Ikigai; 11. HuedHued; 12. Airplan	

=== Singles ===
==== As lead artists ====
Year	Title	Album
2024	"Try Again"	Non-album single
2024	"Three Seconds"	Non-album single
2024	"Ego"	Ego
2025	"Last Moon"	Non-album single
2025	"Pala"	Non-album single
2025	"1313"	Non-album single
2025	"Cake Pop!"	Non-album single
2026	"Hwai"	Single
2026	"Fú!"	SCL
2026	"Turbulencia"	SCL

== Videography ==
=== Music videos ===
Year	Title	Director(s)	Ref.
2024	"Try Again"	Aiden	
2024	"Ego"	Chiporro	
2025	"Last Moon" (Note: Labeled as a visualizer on YouTube)	Chiporro	
2025	"Pala"	Chiporro	
2025	"Pala Remix"	Chiporro and Patrick Luna	
2025	"1313"	Chiporro	
2025	"Cake Pop!"	Chiporro	
2025	"Amor de Navidad"	—N/a	
2026	"Hwai"	Chiporro and Q Are	
2026	"Fú!"	Gaspar Álvarez	

== Accolades ==
=== Awards and nominations ===
Name of the award ceremony, year presented, award category, nominee(s) and the result of the award
Year	Award ceremony	Category	Nominee(s)	Result	Ref.
2025	Premios Índigo	Mejor Artista Independiente (Best Independent Artist)	Themselves	Nominated	

=== Recognitions ===
Special awards given to recognize an achievement or impact
Year	Award	Title	Ref.
2025	Teletón Chile 2025	Recognition Teletón	
2026	YouTube Creator Awards	Silver Creator Award (100K Subscribers)	
