= Better Than Me (Wonho song) =

Single by Wonho

from the album Syndrome
- Released: June 27, 2025
- Genre: Pop
- Length: 2:25
- Label: Intertwine
- Songwriters: Captain Cuts; David Charles Fischer; Lee Ho-seok; Boy Matthews
- Producer: Captain Cuts

Wonho singles chronology
"What Would You Do" (2024)	"Better Than Me" (2025)	"Good Liar" (2025)

Music video
- "Better Than Me" on YouTube

"Better Than Me" is a song by the South Korean singer Wonho. It was released by Intertwine Records under exclusive license to Create Music Group as the lead single of his first solo studio album Syndrome (2025) on June 27, 2025. Written by Captain Cuts, David Charles Fischer, Wonho and Boy Matthews, the contemporary pop song marked comparisons to early-2000s pop and R&B music. "Better Than Me" is Wonho's second English-language single, following the 2024 track "What Would You Do".

== Background ==
Over a month after the release of Bittersweet (2022), Wonho announced his scheduled enlistment in South Korea's mandatory military service, set for December 5. Following Wonho's official discharge on September 4, 2024, he resumed promotional activities by releasing the single "What Would You Do", performing at the iHeartRadio Jingle Ball tour and embarking on his Welcome Back, Wenee fan meet-up tour. He started teasing a new album throughout 2024, revealing he had recorded new music in Chicago and hinting at a February–March 2025 release date. On May 31, 2025, over seven months after the release of "What Would You Do", Wonho confirmed the release of the lead single of his first full-length album, set for release in June. The track's title was unveiled on June 17, confirming a release date of June 27.

== Composition ==
"Better Than Me" is sung in English and is described as a contemporary pop love song. The song's lyrics were written by DCF (David Charles Fischer), Wonho, Boy Matthews and Captain Cuts, the latter of whom also arranged and produced it. The song's style was compared to various early-2000s pop and R&B acts, including Western boy bands NSYNC and the Backstreet Boys, Norwegian duo M2M, and American singers Usher and Ne-Yo.

== Promotion ==
The day following the song's announcement, a scheduler was released, unveiling release dates for various contents related to the song. On June 20, 2025, concept photos for the track were released through Wonho’s social media channels, followed three days later by a spoiler image shared in the same manner. A teaser for the song's music video was released on June 25. On July 7, 2025, a choreography video for "Better Than Me" was uploaded to Wonho's YouTube channel.

On July 9, 2025, a video of Wonho covering "Soda Pop" and "Your Idol" by Saja Boys, from the film K-Pop Demon Hunters (2025), was uploaded to his YouTube channel. Additional short-form videos, including one of him dancing to "Better Than Me" in cosplay, were also released. According to MK, the clips accumulated 3.9 million views on YouTube Shorts, 29 million on TikTok, and 13 million on Instagram Reels.

== Live performances ==
Wonho performed "Better Than Me" on various South Korean music shows. He was part of the lineup for Mnet's M Countdown for its 895th episode, broadcast on July 3, 2025. He also performed the song on KBS' Music Bank and SBS' Inkigayo for their July 4 and 6 episodes respectively. A live performance video was released on Wonho's YouTube channel on July 18. During Wonho's Stay Awake World Tour, "Better Than Me" was performed as the show's opening song.

== Music video ==
The song's music video was first announced alongside its scheduler on June 18, 2025, with a teaser coming out on June 25. It was later released alongside the track on June 27, 2025. The video features Wonho performing a dance routine with dancers in a basketball court. On July 8, 2025, a behind-the-scenes video about the making of the music video was uploaded to Wonho's YouTube channel.

== Personnel ==
Credits adapted from the liner notes of Syndrome.

- Wonho – background vocals, recording
- Sun Ahn – background vocals, recording, digital editing
- Enan – background vocals, recording, digital editing
- Koen Heldens – mixing
- Randy Merrill – mastering

== Release history ==
Release dates and formats
Region	Date	Format	Label	Ref.
Various	June 27, 2025	Digital download; streaming	Intertwine	
