= What Would You Do (Wonho song) =

Single by Wonho
- Released: November 22, 2024
- Genre: Pop; R&B
- Length: 3:00
- Label: Highline
- Songwriters: Finn Askew; Ines Dunn; Joe Kearns; Sam Merrifield
- Producers: Askew; Dunn; Kearns; Merrifield

Wonho singles chronology
"Don't Regret" (2022)	"What Would You Do" (2024)	"Better Than Me" (2025)

Music video
- "What Would You Do" on YouTube

"What Would You Do" is a song by South Korean singer Wonho. It was released through Highline Entertainment on November 22, 2024. It marked the singer's first release since his mandatory military service enlistment in 2022.

== Background and release ==
On November 11, a story was posted to Wonho's Instagram profile, with the question "What would you do... if I released a song?". Hours later, the song was officially announced along with its release date and a link to pre-save the song on streaming services.

On November 11–20, promotional content was posted on the singer's social media accounts, teasing the single's lyrics and music video. It was ultimately released on November 22, accompanied by its music video.

== Composition ==
"What Would You Do" is commonly described as a mid-tempo, pop and R&B ballad, with melancholic lyrics about making someone understand the consequence of their actions after a break-up.

== Music video ==
The music video was simultaneously released with the single on November 22. It was directed by Bart, under the production company Flipevil. It features Wonho, and clones of him, exploring an abandoned warehouse, in which the song's lyrics are embodied through the surroundings of the room. The music video, edited to appear as though filmed in a single take, ends abruptly with him being run over by a car, paying homage to 1985 movie Back to the Future.

== Live performances ==
Wonho performed "What Would You Do" for the magazine Men Noblesse, and the performance was uploaded to YouTube on November 30. He also performed the song at the iHeartRadio Jingle Ball Tour, including stops in Dallas, Chicago, Detroit, and Miami, between December 3 to December 21. It was also performed at his Welcome Back, Wenee fan meet-up tour U.S. stops, between December 4 to December 19.

== Charts ==
Chart performance
Chart (2024)	Peak position
South Korea BGM (Circle)	183

== Release history ==
Release date and formats
Region	Date	Format(s)	Label	Ref.
Various	November 22, 2024	Digital download; streaming	Highline	
