= Open Mind (Wonho song) =

Single by Wonho

from the EP Love Synonym Pt.1: Right for Me
- Language: Korean; English
- Released: September 4, 2020
- Recorded: 2020
- Genre: Electropop
- Length: 3:10
- Label: Highline; Kakao M
- Songwriters: Wonho; Lee Seu-ran
- Producers: Corey Latif Williams; David Brook; Bryan Fryzel; Aaron Kleinstub

Wonho singles chronology
"Losing You" (2020)	"Open Mind" (2020)	"Lose" (2021)

Music video
- "Open Mind" on YouTube

"Open Mind" is the second solo single released by South Korean singer Wonho. It was released as the second single from his debut EP Love Synonym Pt.1: Right for Me on September 4, 2020. A Japanese version of the song was released as the B-side to his first maxi single, "On the Way".

== Background and release ==
The song alongside Wonho's EP was announced on August 9, as the first solo project of Wonho following his departure from Monsta X in October 2019. On August 30, a twenty second video showing a preview of the choreography was released as a teaser.

Wonho performed the song on his debut showcase on the same day as the song's release, hosted through V Live.

== Composition and lyrics ==
It uses a foundation of Eighties-style warped bass and synth to tremendous effect, veering into the electronic music with the occasional distorted vocals and a 808 beat. Wonho's vocals on the song were described as hazy over the pre-chorus and that they lead to a groovy, funk-fuelled drop. The lyrics of the song are a bold invitation to a "one-night stand". The track also grooves with an electro-funk current.

== Music video ==
A music video for "Open Mind" was released alongside the song. It was described as choreography-heavy, with Wonho and his backup dancers performing sleek moves on a dance floor lit up in elegant combinations of reds, purples and blues. The video is interspersed with scenes of the singer getting ready for a night out. The singer then tosses a silver coin contemplatively in the air, stands in an elevator that’s climbing past hundreds of floors and drives a powerful car through a tunnel of streaming, neon lights.

== Accolades ==
=== Listicles ===
Name of critic or publication, name of listicle, name of work and rank
Critic/Publication	List	Rank	Ref.
BuzzFeed	35 Songs That Helped Define K-pop in 2020	6	
CNN Philippines	Best K-pop Songs of 2020	Placed (Note: All the albums and songs listed are either unranked or just alphabetically ranked.)	
Dazed	The 40 Best K-pop Songs of 2020	20	
Paper	The 40 Best K-pop Songs of 2020	37	
Rolling Stone India	20 Best K-pop Music Videos of 2020	18	

== Charts ==
=== Weekly charts ===
Chart performance
Chart (2020)	Peak position
South Korea Download (Gaon)	15
US World Digital Songs (Billboard)	4

== Release history ==
Release dates and formats
Region	Date	Format	Label
South Korea	September 4, 2020	Digital download; streaming	Highline Entertainment; Kakao M
Various	September 4, 2020	Digital download; streaming	Highline Entertainment; Kakao M

== See also ==
- List of K-pop songs on the Billboard charts
