= Universe (platform) =

South Korean mobile app and web platform

- Developer: NCSoft
- Release: January 28, 2021; 5 years ago
- Platform: iOS, Android
- Available in: Korean, English, Japanese
- Type: Entertainment
- Website: universe-official.io

Universe (stylized as UNIVERSE; Korean: 유니버스; RR: Yunibeoseu) was a Korean mobile app and web platform created by the video game developer NCSoft and launched in January 2021.

The global K-pop entertainment platform revealed all 38 participating artists individually from November 12, 2020, to August 29, 2022. The platform officially closed and its service was transferred to Dear U bubble in January 2023, app users being transferred.

== Development ==
Ahead of its launch day, Universe surpassed four million pre-registered users on both the App Store and Google Play. As of January 2021, K-pop fans from 188 countries around the world including South Korea, the United States, Japan, Taiwan, Indonesia, and Brazil completed pre-registration with 80% of these users residing overseas. Two months after its launch, Universe achieved more than five million global downloads with a total 692 exclusive contents released. Four months after its launch, the K-pop entertainment platform surpassed ten million downloads.

On January 20, 2021, NCSoft announced that it will offer original content through its upcoming platform UNIVERSE, which would be produced in partnership with NCSoft's new digital content wing, KLAP.

Within ten months of its release, Universe surpassed 20 million downloads. The proportion of overseas users increased to 89% while the total number of original content released rose to 5,122 with a cumulative view count of 21.46 million. As of July 2022, after the Universe service completely reorganized, with a total of 6,288 original contents, the monthly revisit rate increased 10 times, the cumulative number of views reached 24 million, and the number of global downloads exceeded 24 million.

== Artists ==
=== Current ===
- Astro
- Ateez
- Brave Girls
- CIX
- Choi Ye-na
- DKZ
- Drippin
- Epex
- Ghost9
- (G)I-dle
- Ha Sung-woon
- Heo Young-ji
- Iz*One
- Jo Yu-ri
- Kang Daniel
- Kard
- Kep1er
- Kim Bum
- Kwon Eun-bi
- Lee Dong-wook
- Park Ji-hoon
- Ren
- Viviz
- WEi
- Weki Meki
- Wonho
- Yoo Yeon-seok
- Youngjae (Got7)

=== Former ===
- Oh My Girl (2021–2022, moved to Weverse)
- Yerin (2021–2022, moved to Dear U Bubble under "Bubble with Stars")
- SF9 (2021–2022)
- The Boyz (2020–2023, moved to Weverse)
- Lightsum (2021–2023, moved to Weverse)
- AB6IX (2020–2023, moved to Dear U Bubble under "Bubble with Stars")
- Monsta X (2020–2023, moved to Dear U Bubble under "Bubble for Starship")
- WJSN (2020–2023, moved to Dear U Bubble under "Bubble for Starship")
- Cravity (2021–2023, moved to Dear U Bubble under "Bubble for Starship")
- Ive (2021–2023, moved to Dear U Bubble under "Bubble for Starship")

== Universe Originals ==
=== Series ===
- Kang Daniel – Agent Blackjack K (10 Episodes)
- Monsta X – Area 51: The Code (10 Episodes)
- Iz*One – Fantastic I*z: Hidden School (10 Episodes)

=== Radio ===
- Kang Daniel – Kang Daniel Film Festival (7.25 MHz)
- The Boyz – Star THE Bs D.D.D (12.06 MHz)
- Monsta X – Smart Ones (5.14 MHz)
- Park Jihoon – The Next Door (3.26 MHz)
- Astro – Hot Topics! (2.23 MHz)
- Iz*One – Oneiric Diary (10.29 MHz)
- Ateez – The Clues (10.24 MHz)
- (G)I-dle – Not That Close (5.02 MHz)
- WJSN – Universe War (2.25 MHz)
- AB6IX – Care to Join? (5.22 MHz)
- CIX – Seeds of Temptation (7.23 MHz)
- SF9 – Catch Up! (10.05 MHz)

== Universe Music ==
All artists that have joined Universe will participate in its "Universe Music" series, with various content including music videos released each month. (Note: The full music videos were exclusively released on the Universe app, excluding the one for the platform's theme song Guardians (Universe), which is also accessible on Warner Music Korea's YouTube channel. Starting with "Shark", the music videos are now released on YouTube a few days after their release on the app. Music videos for past Universe Music songs are now also available on the YouTube channels of Universe, Warner Music Korea, 1theK (Kakao Entertainment), and Sony Music Korea.)

Date	Artist	Title	Notes	Ref
Jan 26, 2021	Iz*One	"D-D-Dance"	Prod. Full8loom	(Note: Distribution: Kakao Entertainment)
Feb 9, 2021	Sumi Jo and Rain	"Guardians"	Universe theme song	(Note: Distribution: Warner Music Korea)
Mar 3, 2021	Park Ji-hoon feat. Lee Hi	"Call U Up"	Prod. Primary	
Apr 29, 2021	(G)I-dle	"Last Dance"	Prod. Groovy Room	
May 13, 2021	Kang Daniel feat. Loco	"Outerspace"	N/A	
May 24, 2021	AB6IX	"Gemini"	N/A	
July 1, 2021	CIX	"Tesseract"	Prod. Hui, Minit	
July 11, 2021	The Boyz	"Drink It"	N/A	
July 26, 2021	Monsta X	"Kiss or Death"	N/A	
Sep 2, 2021	Astro	"Alive"	N/A	
Sep 23, 2021	WJSN	"Let Me In"	N/A	
Oct 1, 2021	WEi	"Starry Night"	Prod. Dress	
Nov 11, 2021	Drippin	"Vertigo"	N/A	
Dec 23, 2021	Oh My Girl	"Shark"	N/A	
Dec 30, 2021	SF9	"Savior"	N/A	(Note: Distribution: Sony Music Korea)
Jan 31, 2022	Ateez	"Don't Stop"	N/A	
Mar 10, 2022	Kwon Eun-bi	"Esper"	N/A	
Apr 14, 2022	Ha Sung-woon	"La La Pop!"	N/A	
Apr 29, 2022	Kang Daniel	"Ready to Ride"	N/A	
May 31, 2022	Cravity	"Vivid"	N/A	
Jun 17, 2022	The Boyz	"Sweet"	N/A	
July 7, 2022	Monsta X	"If with U"	N/A	
July 21, 2022	Astro	"U&Iverse"	N/A	
Aug 11, 2022	Jo Yu-ri	"Maybe"	N/A	
Aug 19, 2022	Wonho	"Don't hesitate"	N/A	
Sep 23, 2022	Kep1er	"Sugar Rush"	N/A	
Oct 27, 2022	Viviz	"Rum Pum Pum"	N/A	

== Concerts ==
Date	Title	Venue	Performing Artist(s)	Attendance	Ref.
February 14, 2021	UNI-KON	Online	AB6IX; Astro; Ateez; CIX; Cravity; (G)I-dle; Iz*One; Kang Daniel; Monsta X; Oh My Girl; Park Jihoon; The Boyz; WEi; WJSN	2,600,000	
July 2, 2022	UNI-KON	SK Olympic Handball Gymnasium and online	Astro; Ghost9; Ive; Park Ji-hoon; The Boyz; WEi; Weki Meki; WJSN; Wonho; Younite	3,800,000	
July 3, 2022	UNI-KON	SK Olympic Handball Gymnasium and online	Ateez; CIX; Cravity; Drippin; EPEX; Jo Yu-ri; Kep1er; Lightsum; SF9; Yena	3,800,000	

== Fan meetings ==
=== Universe Fan Event ===
Date	Title	Performing Artist(s)	Ref.
July 23, 2022	Black Gambler	Kang Daniel	
August 19, 2022	Happy Yerin Day	Yerin	
November 18, 2022	Sunset Beach	Kep1er	

=== Universe Fan Party ===
Date	Title	Venue	Performing Artist(s)	Ref.
February 28, 2021	Iz*one Online Fan Party	Online	Iz*One	
April 17, 2021	CIX: Blooming Day	Online	CIX	
May 16, 2021	Dear My D	Online	Kang Daniel	
June 6, 2021	Sunday Cravity	Online	Cravity	
July 24, 2021 (cancelled) (Note: Indefinite postponement due to COVID-19.)	Monsta Castle	Online	Monsta X	
November 7, 2021	Welcome to WJSN House	YES24 Live Hall	WJSN	
February 11, 2022	Oh My Princess Diary	YES24 Live Hall	Oh My Girl	
May 7, 2022	Dream Driver	Nodeul Live House	Drippin	
May 8, 2022	Eunbi's Secret Store	Nodeul Live House	Kwon Eun-bi	
May 21, 2022	School Fest. in Neverland	YES24 Live Hall	(G)I-dle	
