= Love Synonym Pt.2: Right for Us =

- Digital cover

EP by Wonho
- Released: February 26, 2021
- Length: 24:43
- Language: Korean; English
- Label: Highline; Kakao M; BMG

Wonho chronology
Love Synonym Pt.1: Right for Me (2020)	Love Synonym Pt.2: Right for Us (2021)	Blue Letter (2021)

Singles from Love Synonym Pt.2: Right for Us
- 1. "Lose" Released: February 26, 2021

Love Synonym Pt.2: Right for Us (stylized as Love Synonym #2: Right for Us) is the second part of the debut extended play by South Korean singer Wonho. It was released by Highline Entertainment and BMG Rights Management, and distributed by Kakao M on February 26, 2021. Its release was supported by the single "Lose".

== Background and release ==
Wonho initially announced an upcoming EP in 2020 and performed a song "Flash" at his online concert in September 2020. The title and the release date were confirmed in February 2021. It is the continuation of the series started by his first EP, Love Synonym Pt.1: Right for Me (2020).

A music video for "Lose" was released on the same day as the EP. It was also released in two language versions; English and Korean. For the song "Ain't About You", Wonho collaborated with singer-songwriter Kiiara. For the song "Weneed", Wonho released a special video through his personal YouTube channel on his birthday; the song is named in reference to Wonho's fanbase "Wenee".

== Critical reception ==
Professional ratings
Review scores
Source	Rating
NME	4/5 stars

Ruby C of NME gave the EP four stars, saying that it "seems to have found a well-balanced equilibrium in both sound and vibe". P. Claire Dodson described the EP for Teen Vogue as "a delightful, concise EP, especially on tracks like "Weneed", a pretty soft-pop hit with a power-pop chorus that highlights [Wonho's] smooth vocals".

== Track listing ==
Love Synonym Pt.2: Right for Us track listing
No.	Title	Lyrics	Music	Arrangement	Length
1.	"Lose"	Wonho; Brother Su	Noah Conrad; Tony Ferrari; Roland Spreckley	Wonho; Stereo14	3:07
2.	"Devil"	153/Joombas; I Jin-gyeong; Geum Seong-sik	153/Joombas; I Jin-gyeong	153/Joombas; I Jin-gyeong; Geum Seong-sik	3:24
3.	"Best Shot"	Wonho; Savage House Gang; An Seon-yong	Wonho; Savage House Gang; An Seon-yong	Wonho; Savage House Gang; An Seon-yong	3:16
4.	"Weneed"	Wonho; Savage House Gang; An Seon-yong	Wonho; Savage House Gang; An Seon-yong	Wonho; Savage House Gang; An Seon-yong	3:14
5.	"Ain't About You" (featuring Kiiara)	Frequency for Freq Show Music, Inc.	Bryan Fryzel; Elizabeth Lowell Boland; Brandon Treyshun Campbell		3:24
6.	"Flash"	Wonho; 1Hz; Vendors; Brother Su	Wonho; 1Hz; Vendors; Brother Su	Wonho; 1Hz; Vendors; Brother Su	3:38
7.	"Lose" (English version)	Noah Conrad; Tony Ferrari; Roland Spreckley	Noah Conrad		3:06
8.	"Outro: And"		Wonho; Savage House Gang	Wonho; Savage House Gang	1:34
Total length:					24:43

== Charts ==
=== Weekly charts ===
Weekly chart performance
Chart (2021)	Peak position
Japanese Albums (Oricon)	27
South Korean Albums (Gaon)	2

=== Monthly chart ===
Monthly chart performance
Chart (2021)	Peak position
South Korean Albums (Gaon)	5

== Sales ==
Sales
Region	Certification	Certified units/Sales
South Korea	—	105,084
Japan	—	2,275

== Release history ==
Release dates and formats
Region	Date	Format	Label	Ref.
South Korea	February 26, 2021	CD	Highline; Kakao M	
Various	February 26, 2021	Digital download; streaming	Highline; BMG	

== See also ==
- List of K-pop songs on the Billboard charts
