= Wonho =

South Korean singer (born 1993)

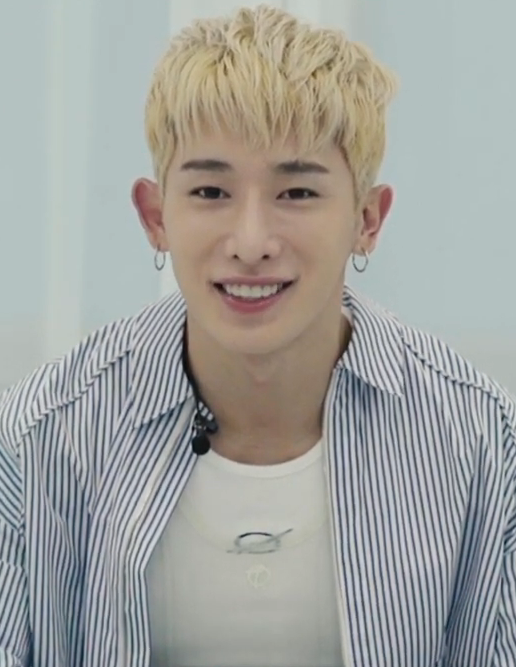
- Wonho in 2021
- Born: Lee Ho-seok; March 1, 1993 (age 33); Gunpo, Gyeonggi Province, South Korea
- Occupations: Singer; songwriter; producer
- Musical career
- Genres: K-pop; EDM; R&B
- Instrument: Vocals
- Years active: 2015–present
- Labels: Starship; Highline; Victor; Intertwine
- Formerly of: Monsta X

Korean name
- Hangul: 이호석
- RR: I Hoseok
- MR: I Hosŏk

Stage name
- Hangul: 원호
- RR: Wonho
- MR: Wŏnho

Lee Ho-seok (Korean: 이호석, born March 1, 1993), known by his stage name Wonho (Korean: 원호), is a South Korean singer under Highline Entertainment. He is a former member of South Korean boy group Monsta X under Starship Entertainment. In 2020, he made his solo debut with the EP Love Synonym Pt.1: Right for Me, alongside its lead single "Open Mind", which charted both on the Gaon Chart and Billboard charts.

In 2021, he signed with Intertwine Records, a partnership between Eshy Gazit and BMG, for his activities in the United States. He also made his Japanese debut with the single "On the Way", which charted on the Oricon Singles Chart. After his South Korea's mandatory military service discharge in 2024, he released "What Would You Do". In 2025, he released his first studio album Syndrome, supported by the singles "Better Than Me", "Good Liar", and "If You Wanna", under Intertwine Records.

== Early life ==
Lee Ho-seok was born on March 1, 1993, in Gunpo, Gyeonggi Province, South Korea. Raised in Sanbon-dong, Gunpo, he lived with his parents, grandmother and younger brother; the family experienced financial hardship during his childhood. He has spoken about being bullied during elementary school and later becoming involved in juvenile delinquency as a teenager. After developing an interest in music during high school, he moved to Seoul to train under Starship Entertainment.

== Career ==
=== 2014: Nu Boyz and No.Mercy ===
Prior to his official debut, Wonho became part of a project group called Nu Boyz, alongside his labelmates #Gun, Shownu, and Joohoney, formed under Starship Entertainment in August 2014. The quartet uploaded multiple tracks to the label's channel on YouTube, including performing at the opening show of the Starship X concert on December 5, 2014.

In late December, Starship Entertainment and Mnet launched a survival competition program called No.Mercy. On its final episode, Wonho was selected, alongside the other six contestants, including the Nu Boyz's members Shownu and Joohoney, as a member of the label's new boy group Monsta X.

=== 2015–2019: Monsta X ===
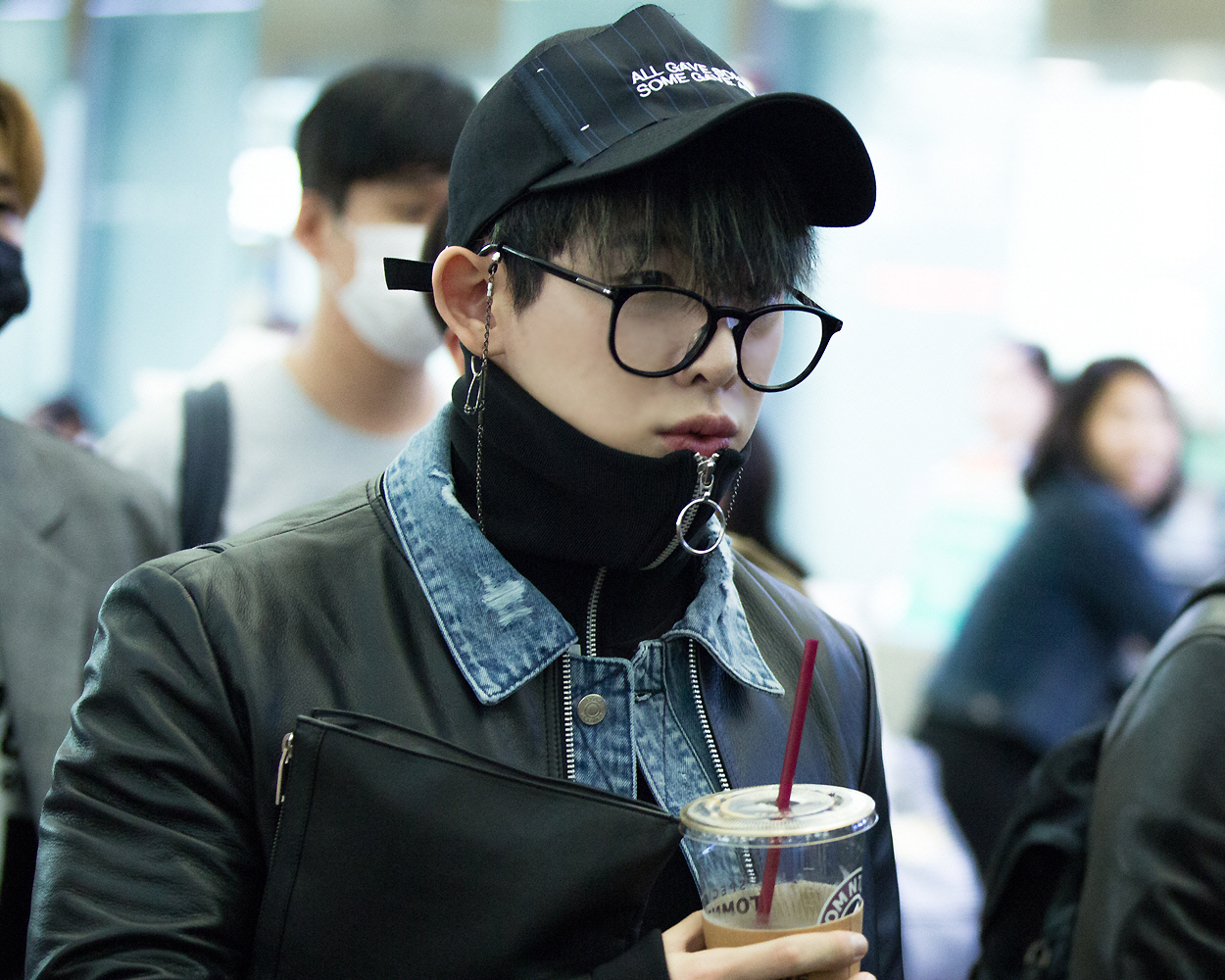
Wonho in 2017

Wonho debuted in Monsta X, a hip-hop boy group, upon the release of their first extended play Trespass, on May 14, 2015. Wonho was a vocalist in the group and beginning in 2017 regularly participated in writing, composing and arranging songs for the group.

Since 2018, Wonho has featured in several photoshoots for magazines, as well as partnering with some brands and promoting campaigns by various fashion magazines. He has appeared alongside his groupmates on several occasions, including Nylon, alongside Shownu in January 2018 and GQ in August, in both Ceci Korea in June 2018 and MAPS, with Minhyuk in December, lastly, Grazia, with Hyungwon in March 2019. He also participated in the collaboration project, with Elle and Tom Ford, alongside Shownu, in promotion of Tom Ford's latest perfume line in August 2019. He also made solo appearances, such as a feature in Dazed in November 2019.

Wonho has been recognized as the Korean celebrity who focuses on fitness and physical training, while in several interviews surrounding his photoshoots, he has talked about healthy habits, and emphasized the importance of exercising. In October 2018, he partnered with Under Armour, as part of the collaboration with Dazed, to promote an active and healthy lifestyle. He again promoted healthy lifestyle, as part of a photoshoot for Elle's "Body Challenge" campaign, in May 2019.

On October 31, Starship Entertainment announced Wonho's departure from Monsta X following allegations of him not paying back money he owed to a friend, after rumors about the illegal use of marijuana when he was younger surfaced on social media.

=== 2020: Solo debut with Love Synonym Pt.1: Right for Me and first solo concert ===
On March 14, Starship Entertainment released an official statement announcing that the investigation made by the Seoul Metropolitan Police Agency's narcotics investigation team had been concluded; Wonho had been cleared of all allegations and the rumors were false.

Wonho signed with Highline Entertainment, a subsidiary of Starship Entertainment, as a solo artist on April 10. The agency announced that he would be promoting as a solo artist and producer going forward. On May 6, Maverick revealed through a Twitter post that they had signed a management agreement with Wonho for his international activities.

On August 9, Wonho announced the release of his first solo EP Love Synonym Pt.1: Right for Me. On August 14, he then released the pre-release English-language single "Losing You", along with its music video. "Losing You" gained praise for showing Wonho's all-around musicality, including his vocals, participation in the songwriting, composing, and producing of the song. The album was released on September 4 with the title track "Open Mind", accompanied by a music video. Wonho had his debut showcase the same day, hosted through V Live.

Wonho held his first solo concert on September 27. Due to restrictions from COVID-19, the concert was held online through the streaming platform LiveXLive. During his concert, Wonho announced his first comeback, with a new EP, which was originally intended to be released by the end of 2020, although without a set date. He pre-released a song from the upcoming EP "Flash" through his concert.

=== 2021: Love Synonym Pt.2: Right for Us, second concert and Blue Letter ===
Wonho's second part of his first EP Love Synonym Pt.2: Right for Us was released on February 26. All five songs from the EP debuted on the Billboard World Digital Song Sales chart, occupying twenty percent of the entire World Songs chart for that week.

He held an online concert WeNeedLove, through LiveXLive on March 28. During the concert, Wonho announced his intention for his next comeback in summer of 2021.

In May, Wonho released a music video for the song "Ain't About You" from his second part of his first EP, in collaboration with Kiiara.

On June 15, his American manager, Eshy Gazit announced the launch of a new label venture Intertwine, in partnership with BMG, with Monsta X and Wonho as the first two artists involved in the partnership.

On July 19, Wonho joined NCSoft's global K-pop entertainment platform Universe.

In July, it was announced that Wonho would release his debut Japanese single album on October 27, with the lead single "On the Way". On August 4, he pre-released the Japanese version of the song "Lose".

Wonho released his second EP Blue Letter on September 14, with the title track "Blue".

On December 1, Wonho released the Japanese digital single "White Miracle".

=== 2022: Facade, first musical and first solo tour ===
Wonho made his comeback with his first single album Obsession on February 16, with the title track "Eye On You".

In May, Wonho became the exclusive model of a dual-formulation and diet dual-functional complex product Cent Double.

Wonho released his third EP Facade on June 13, with the title track "Crazy".

From June 3 to July 24, Wonho is set to appear in his first musical with Equal, a work that reflects on today's chaotic times due to pandemics and conspiracy theories, set in the 17th century Europe, where witches and heresy hunts were rampant. It is a two-person play that captures the metaphor of the COVID-19 era with the desperate desires and twisted fates of Nikola and Theo, two friends driven by the fear of death and extreme loneliness. Wonho will perform as Theo, a bright and cheerful country doctor who struggles to save his friend Nikola, who is dying from an incurable disease.

On July 6, Highline released the poster and schedule for Wonho's first European tour Facade, through his official SNS. According to the schedule released with the poster, he will be in Munich and Oberhausen, Germany on August 28 and 31, respectively, Madrid, Spain on September 2, and London, England on September 4.

On August 19, Wonho released the promotional single "Don't Hesitate" through Universe Music for the mobile application Universe.

In September, Wonho announced the release of his second single album Bittersweet on October 14, with the title track "Don't Regret".

On November 23, Wonho announced a final concert Everyday Christmas before his mandatory military service. It was held in two separate time slots while live-streamed globally on the BigC platform on December 3.

On December 5, he enlisted for his mandatory military service as a public service worker. Wonho was officially discharged on September 4, 2024.

=== 2024–present: Syndrome and Core ===
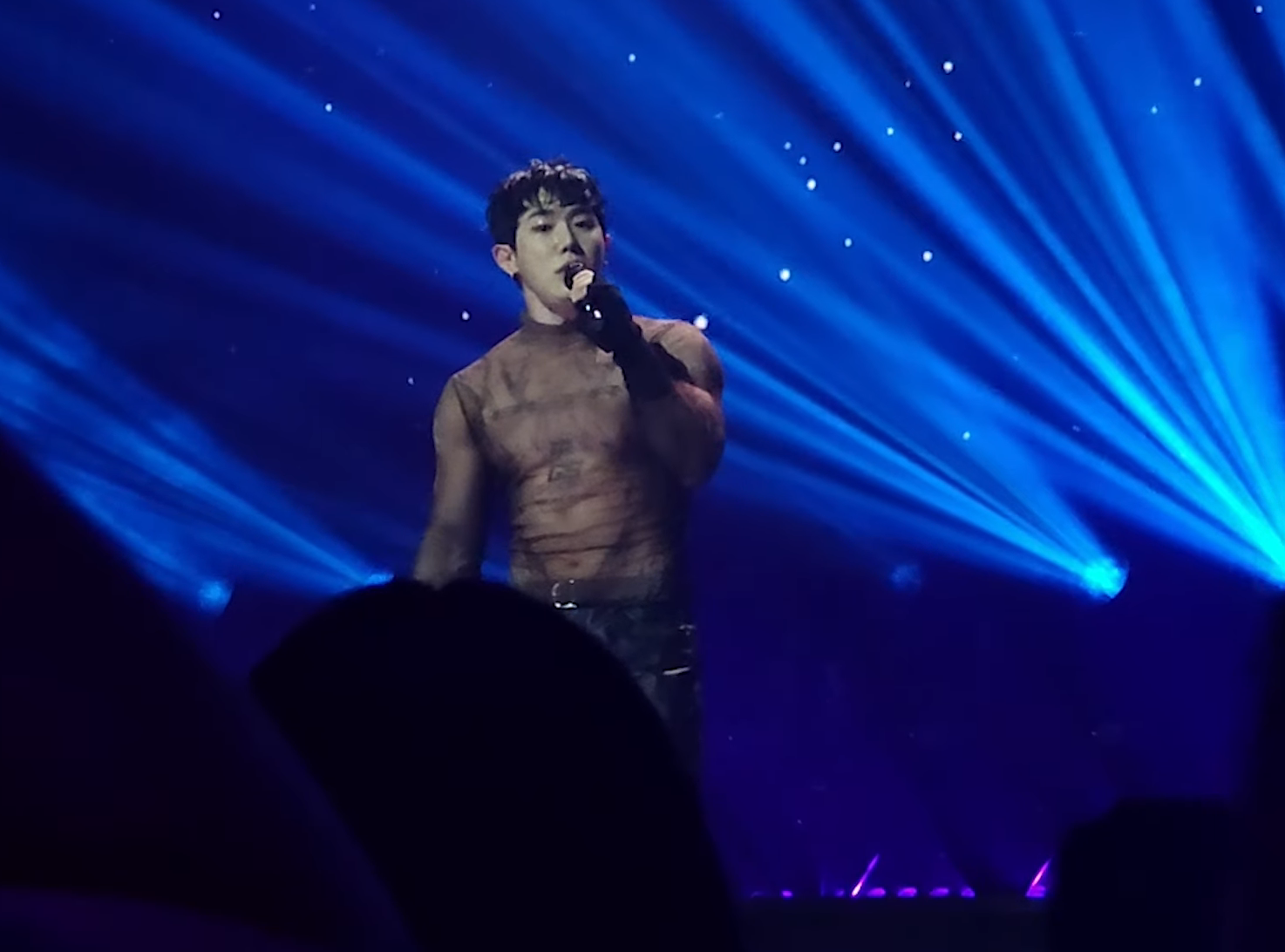
Wonho performing in 2025

On November 22, he released the English single "What Would You Do". In December, Wonho participated in the iHeartRadio Jingle Ball Tour.

In June 2025, he pre-released a first single "Better Than Me", a song inspired by early 2000s Pop groups like M2M and NSYNC, in anticipation of his first studio album Syndrome, which was released on October 31. In support of the album, he embarked on the 2025 Stay Awake World Tour, which took place in Latin America and Europe during July and September, respectively. Following the plans of a North American leg in November and December, it was eventually cancelled due to "operational issues" and "administrative delays" by the tour's promoter. On October 3, Wonho pre-released a second single "Good Liar". "If You Wanna" was released as the album's third single and the title track alongside the release of Syndrome.

In January 2026, it was announced that two new dates will be added to the Stay Awake World Tour, which will be in Saitama and Seoul in February and March, respectively. On June 29, Highline Entertainment announced Wonho's fourth EP, Core, which was released on July 21. The EP's lead single, "Don't Wake Me Up!", was released simultaneously. He is also set to embark on a series of concerts across the United States, beginning in Lincoln, California, on July 11 and concluding in Highland, California, on August 14.

== Artistry ==
=== Musical style and songwriting ===
Journalists have described Wonho's musical style as a combination of pop music, EDM and R&B. Wonho has cited Rain as a childhood role model and an influence on his decision to pursue a career in music. He has also mentioned Dua Lipa, Charli XCX, Ed Sheeran and MNEK as other musicians he enjoys listening to, while also expressing interest on exploring country and rock music in future releases.

Wonho has been actively involved in songwriting and music production throughout his career, frequently collaborating with producer Enan, singer Sun Ahn and singer-songwriter BrotherSu. He has also written songs for other artists, including his former group, Monsta X. Alongside Enan, he has written Japanese-language lyrics for songs by South Korean singer Woody as part of the production team Team Wonho.

=== Imagery ===
Wonho frequently utilizes the color blue for his visual concepts and imagery, describing it as a "signature color". He has stated that he associates the color with his fans, and views it as representative of his emotions, explaining that he sees the color blue when thinking of them.

== Discography ==
=== Studio album ===
Title	Details	Peak chart positions	Sales
Title	Details	KOR	Sales
Syndrome	Released: October 31, 2025; Label: Intertwine; Formats: CD, digital download, streaming audio	19	KOR: 16,466

=== Extended plays ===
List of extended plays, with selected details, chart positions and sales
Title	Details	Peak chart positions				Sales
Title	Details	KOR	JPN	UK Down.	US World	Sales
Love Synonym Pt.1: Right for Me	Released: September 4, 2020; Label: Highline Entertainment; Formats: CD, digital download, streaming audio	1	8	31	9	KOR: 146,068; JPN: 5,363
Love Synonym Pt.2: Right for Us	Released: February 26, 2021; Label: Highline Entertainment; Formats: CD, digital download, streaming audio	2	27	62	—	KOR: 105,084; JPN: 2,275
Blue Letter	Released: September 14, 2021; Label: Highline Entertainment; Formats: CD, digital download, streaming audio	5	—	—	—	KOR: 78,758
Facade	Released: June 13, 2022; Label: Highline Entertainment; Formats: CD, digital download, streaming audio	8	—	—	—	KOR: 53,251
Core	Released: July 21, 2026; Label: Highline Entertainment; Formats: CD, digital download, streaming audio	7	—	—	—	KOR: 15,680
"—" denotes releases that did not chart or were not released in that region.

=== Single albums ===
List of single albums, with selected details, chart positions and sales
Title	Details	Peak chart positions	Sales
Title	Details	KOR	Sales
Obsession	Released: February 16, 2022; Label: Highline Entertainment; Formats: CD, digital download, streaming audio	3	KOR: 74,154
Bittersweet	Released: October 14, 2022; Label: Highline Entertainment; Formats: CD, digital download, streaming audio	11	KOR: 57,464

=== Singles ===
==== As lead artist ====
List of singles, showing year released, chart positions, sales and album name
Title	Year	Peak chart positions				Sales	Album
Title	Year	KOR DL	KOR BGM	JPN	US World	Sales	Album
"Open Mind"	2020	15	—	N/A	4	Undisclosed	Love Synonym Pt.1: Right for Me
"Lose"	2021	16	—	N/A	5	Undisclosed	Love Synonym Pt.2: Right for Us
"Blue"	2021	30	67	N/A	14	Undisclosed	Blue Letter
"Eye on You"	2022	40	57	N/A	9	Undisclosed	Obsession
"Crazy"	2022	17	—	N/A	—	Undisclosed	Facade
"Don't Regret"	2022	33	—	N/A	—	Undisclosed	Bittersweet
"Don't Wake Me Up!"	2026	80	—	N/A	—	Undisclosed	Core
Japanese
"Lose"	2021	—	—	—	—	Undisclosed	Non-album single
"On the Way"	2021	—	—	15	—	JPN: 4,114 (Phy.)	On the Way
"White Miracle"	2021	—	—	—	—	Undisclosed	Non-album single
English
"Losing You"	2020	—	—	N/A	—	Undisclosed	Love Synonym Pt.1: Right for Me
"What Would You Do"	2024	—	183	N/A	—	Undisclosed	Non-album single
"Better Than Me"	2025	—	—	N/A	—	Undisclosed	Syndrome
"Good Liar"	2025	—	—	N/A	—	Undisclosed	Syndrome
"If You Wanna"	2025	—	—	N/A	—	Undisclosed	Syndrome
"—" denotes releases that did not chart or were not released in that region.

==== As featured artist ====
List of singles as featured artist, showing year released, chart positions, sales and album name
Title	Year	Peak chart position	Sales	Album
Title	Year	KOR	Sales	Album
"0 (Young)" (Jooyoung, Mad Clown and Giriboy feat. No.Mercy contestants)	2015	71	KOR: 43,760	No.Mercy OST Part 3

==== Promotional singles ====
List of promotional singles, showing year released and album name
Title	Year	Peak chart positions	Album
Title	Year	US World	Album
"Ain't About You" (featuring Kiiara)	2021	18	Love Synonym Pt.2: Right for Us
"Don't Hesitate" (Note: "Don't Hesitate" was released as a promotional single in collaboration with Universe.)	2022	—	Non-album single
"—" denotes releases that did not chart or were not released in that region.

=== Other charted songs ===
List of other charted songs, showing year released, chart positions and album name
Title	Year	Peak chart positions		Album
Title	Year	US World	KOR DL	Album
"Devil"	2021	22	—	Love Synonym Pt.2: Right for Us
"Weneed"	2021	23	—	Love Synonym Pt.2: Right for Us
"Flash"	2021	25	—	Love Synonym Pt.2: Right for Us
"Can't Get Enough"	2026	—	141	Core
"Test Drive"	2026	—	143	Core
"Answer"	2026	—	144	Core
"Down"	2026	—	145	Core
"Promises" (featuring BrotherSu)	2026	—	146	Core
"Summer Blue"	2026	—	151	Core
"—" denotes releases that did not chart or were not released in that region.

=== Music videos ===
Title	Year	Artist	Director	Ref.
Korean
"Losing You"	2020	Wonho	Choi Young-ji (PinkLabel Visual)	
"Open Mind"	2020	Wonho	Kim Min-woo (Desert Beagle)	
"Lose"	2021	Wonho	Tankboyandidle	
"Ain't About You"	2021	Wonho feat. Kiiara	Choi Young-ji (PinkLabel Visual)	
"Blue"	2021	Wonho	Kim Min-woo (Tankboyandidle)	
"Eye On You"	2022	Wonho	Naive Creative Production	
"Crazy"	2022	Wonho	Seo Dong-hyeok (Flipevil)	
"Don't Hesitate"	2022	Wonho	Novv Kim	
"Don't Regret"	2022	Wonho	Seo Dong-hyeok (Flipevil)	
Japanese
"On the Way"	2021	Wonho	Ink	
English
"What Would You Do"	2024	Wonho	Bart (Flipevil)	
"If You Wanna"	2025	Wonho	Bart (Flipevil) and Lee Jin-myung	

== Filmography ==
=== Television shows ===
Year	Show	Role	Note	Ref.
2014–2015	No.Mercy	Contestant	5th member announced as part of Monsta X	
2022	Idol Challenge: Another Class	Special MC	Season 2	

=== Radio show ===
- On Air Spin-off (2021; DJ)

=== Musical ===
- Equal (2022; performed as Theo)

=== Music video appearance ===
- Sistar – "Shake It" (2015; with Shownu, Kang Kyun-sung, and Choi Hyun-seok)

== Songwriting ==
All credits are adapted from the Korea Music Copyright Association, unless stated otherwise.

Year	Artist	Song	Album	Lyrics		Music		Arrangement	
Year	Artist	Song	Album	Credited	With	Credited	With	Credited	With
2015	Monsta X	"Steal Your Heart"	Trespass	Yes	Joohoney, I.M, Rhymer	No	N/A	No	N/A
2017	Monsta X	"Oi"	The Clan Pt. 2.5: The Final Chapter	Yes	Joohoney, I.M, Brother Su	Yes	Brother Su, JJB, XEPY, Vo3e	No	N/A
2017	Monsta X	"5:14 (Last Page)"	The Clan Pt. 2.5: The Final Chapter	Yes	Joohoney, I.M	No	N/A	No	N/A
2017	Monsta X	"넌 어때" (I'll Be There)	The Clan Pt. 2.5: The Final Chapter	Yes	Joohoney, I.M	Yes	JJB	Yes	JJB
2017	Monsta X	"From Zero"	The Code	Yes	Joohoney, I.M, Brother Su	Yes	Rich Jang	Yes	Rich Jang
2018	Monsta X	"If Only"	The Connect: Dejavu	Yes	Joohoney, I.M, Rich Jang	Yes	Rich Jang	Yes	Rich Jang
2018	Monsta X	"Heart Attack"	Take.1 Are You There?	Yes	Joohoney, I.M	No	N/A	No	N/A
2018	Monsta X	"I Do Love U (널하다)"	Take.1 Are You There?	Yes	Joohoney, I.M, Kihyun, Minhyuk	Yes	An Seong-hyeon, Shin Ki-hyun	Yes	An Seong-hyeon, Shin Ki-hyun
2018	Monsta X	"Spotlight (Korean Ver.)"	Take.1 Are You There?	Yes	Joohoney, I.M	No	N/A	No	N/A
2019	Monsta X	"No Reason"	Take.2 We Are Here	Yes	Joohoney, I.M, Brother Su	Yes	Brother Su, An Seong-hyeon, Shin Ki-hyun	Yes	An Seong-hyeon, Shin Ki-hyun
2019	Monsta X	"Mirror"	Follow: Find You	Yes	Joohoney, I.M, Brother Su	Yes	Brother Su, An Seong-hyeon, Shin Ki-hyun	No	N/A
2020	Monsta X	"Who Do U Love? (will.i.am remix; feat. French Montana)"	All About Luv	Yes	French Montana, Monsta X, Torrey Jake, Conrad Noah Patrick, Henig Daniel Doron	Yes	French Montana, Monsta X, Torrey Jake, Conrad Noah Patrick, Henig Daniel Doron	No	N/A
2020	Monsta X	"Middle of the Night"	All About Luv	No	N/A	Yes	Monsta X, Payami Ali, Mitchell John Lathrop	No	N/A
2020	Monsta X	"Breathe For You"	Monsta X's Puppy Day (Web Reality Show) OST	Yes	Joohoney, I.M	No	N/A	No	N/A
2020	Wonho	"Open Mind"	Love Synonym Pt.1: Right for Me	Yes	Lee Seu-ran	No	N/A	No	N/A
2020	Wonho	"I Just"	Love Synonym Pt.1: Right for Me	Yes	Savage House Gang, An Seon-yong, Post Gothic	Yes	Savage House Gang, An Seon-yong, Post Gothic	Yes	Savage House Gang, An Seon-yong, Post Gothic
2020	Wonho	"Lost in Paradise"	Love Synonym Pt.1: Right for Me	Yes	Savage House Gang, An Seon-yong, Post Gothic	Yes	Savage House Gang, An Seon-yong, Post Gothic	Yes	Savage House Gang, An Seon-yong, Post Gothic
2020	Wonho	"Interlude: Runway"	Love Synonym Pt.1: Right for Me	No	N/A	Yes	Savage House Gang	Yes	Savage House Gang
2020	Wonho	"Losing You"	Love Synonym Pt.1: Right for Me	Yes	Corey Sanders, Jon Maguire, Neil Ormandy, Nick Gale	Yes	Corey Sanders, Jon Maguire, Neil Ormandy, Nick Gale	Yes	Corey Sanders, Jon Maguire, Neil Ormandy, Nick Gale
2021	Wonho	"Lose"	Love Synonym Pt.2: Right for Us	Yes	Brother Su, Noah Conrad, Tony Ferrari, Roland Spreckley	No	N/A	Yes	Stereo14
2021	Wonho	"Best Shot"	Love Synonym Pt.2: Right for Us	Yes	Savage House Gang, An Seon-yong	Yes	Savage House Gang, An Seon-yong	Yes	Savage House Gang, An Seon-yong
2021	Wonho	"Weneed"	Love Synonym Pt.2: Right for Us	Yes	Savage House Gang, An Seon-yong	Yes	Savage House Gang, An Seon-yong	Yes	Savage House Gang, An Seon-yong
2021	Wonho	"Flash"	Love Synonym Pt.2: Right for Us	Yes	1 Hz, Vendors, Brother Su	Yes	1 Hz, Vendors, Brother Su	Yes	1 Hz, Vendors, Brother Su
2021	Wonho	"Outro: And"	Love Synonym Pt.2: Right for Us	No	N/A	Yes	Savage House Gang	Yes	Savage House Gang
2021	Wonho	"Intro: Seasons and Patterns"	Blue Letter	No	N/A	Yes	Savage House Gang	Yes	Savage House Gang
2021	Wonho	"Blue"	Blue Letter	Yes	Savage House Gang, Sun Ahn, Brother Su	Yes	Savage House Gang, Sun Ahn	Yes	Savage House Gang, Sun Ahn
2021	Wonho	"No Text No Call"	Blue Letter	Yes	Savage House Gang, Sun Ahn	Yes	Savage House Gang, Sun Ahn	Yes	Savage House Gang, Sun Ahn
2021	Wonho	"Come Over Tonight"	Blue Letter	Yes	Savage House Gang, Sun Ahn	Yes	Savage House Gang, Sun Ahn, Oshimaxx	Yes	Savage House Gang, Sun Ahn
2021	Wonho	"24/7"	Blue Letter	Yes	Savage House Gang, Sun Ahn	Yes	Savage House Gang, Sun Ahn	Yes	Savage House Gang, Sun Ahn
2021	Wonho	"Stranger"	Blue Letter	Yes	Savage House Gang, Sun Ahn	Yes	Savage House Gang, Sun Ahn	Yes	Savage House Gang, Sun Ahn
2021	Wonho	"Blue" (English version)	Blue Letter	Yes	Savage House Gang, Sun Ahn	Yes	Savage House Gang, Sun Ahn	Yes	Savage House Gang, Sun Ahn
2022	Wonho	"Eye On You"	Obsession	Yes	Savage House Gang, Sun Ahn, Brother Su	Yes	Savage House Gang, Sun Ahn	Yes	Savage House Gang, Sun Ahn
2022	Wonho	"Somebody"	Obsession	Yes	Savage House Gang, Sun Ahn	Yes	Savage House Gang, Sun Ahn	Yes	Savage House Gang, Sun Ahn
2022	Wonho	"Intro: 9AM"	Facade	No	N/A	Yes	Enan	Yes	Enan
2022	Wonho	"Crazy"	Facade	Yes	Enan, Sun Ahn, Brother Su	Yes	Enan, Sun Ahn	Yes	Enan, Sun Ahn
2022	Wonho	"Close"	Facade	Yes	Enan, Sun Ahn	Yes	Enan, Sun Ahn	Yes	Enan, Sun Ahn
2022	Wonho	"White Miracle" (Korean version)	Facade	Yes	Enan, Sun Ahn	Yes	Enan, Sun Ahn	Yes	Enan, Sun Ahn
2022	Wonho	"Outro: 9PM"	Facade	No	N/A	Yes	Enan	Yes	Enan
2022	Wonho	"Don't hesitate"	Non-album single	Yes	Enan, Knave	Yes	Enan, Knave	Yes	Enan
2022	Wonho	"Don't Regret"	Bittersweet	Yes	Savage House Gang, Sun Ahn, Brother Su	Yes	Savage House Gang, Sun Ahn	Yes	Enan, Sun Ahn
2022	Wonho feat. Yunhway	"On & On"	Bittersweet	Yes	Savage House Gang, Yunhway, Sun Ahn	Yes	Savage House Gang, Yunhway, Sun Ahn	Yes	Enan, Sun Ahn

== Tours and concerts ==
=== Headlining tours ===
- Facade European Tour (2022)
- Welcome Back, Wenee (2024)
- Stay Awake World Tour (2025–2026)

=== Headlining concerts ===
- IWonhoYou (2020)
- WeNeedLove (2021)
- We Are Young (2021)
- Everyday Christmas (2022)

== Awards and nominations ==
Name of the award ceremony, year presented, category, recipient of the award and the result of the nomination
Award ceremony	Year	Category	Recipient	Result	Ref.
Asia Artist Awards	2021	Best Musician Award	Himself	Won	
Asia Artist Awards	2021	Male Solo Singer Popularity Award	Himself	Nominated	
Asia Star Entertainer Awards	2026	Best Stage	Himself	Won	
BreakTudo Awards	2025	Asian Artist	Himself	Nominated	
Golden Disc Awards	2021	Disc Bonsang	Love Synonym Pt.1: Right for Me	Nominated	
Hanteo Music Awards	2021	Artist Award – Male Solo (Top 3)	Himself	Won	

== See also ==
- List of K-pop on the Billboard charts
