= Love Synonym Pt.1: Right for Me =

- Digital cover

EP by Wonho
- Released: September 4, 2020
- Length: 23:38
- Language: Korean; English
- Label: Highline; Kakao M; Intertwine

Wonho chronology
Love Synonym Pt.1: Right for Me (2020)	Love Synonym Pt.2: Right for Us (2021)

Singles from Love Synonym Pt.1: Right for Me
- 1. "Losing You" Released: August 14, 2020; 2. "Open Mind" Released: September 4, 2020

Love Synonym Pt.1: Right for Me (stylized as Love Synonym #1: Right for Me) is the first part of the debut extended play by the South Korean singer Wonho. It was released on September 4, 2020 by Highline Entertainment and Intertwine Records, and distributed by Kakao M.

Its release was supported by the singles "Losing You" and "Open Mind", alongside an online concert titled IWonhoYou which was held on September 26–27, 2020. A second part titled Love Synonym Pt.2: Right for Us was released on February 26, 2021.

== Background and release ==
The EP was announced on August 9, 2020 as Wonho's first solo project, following his departure from Monsta X on October 31, 2019. It contains a total of eight tracks, in both Korean and English.

It was preceded by the English-language single "Losing You", digitally pre-released on August 14, together with an accompanying music video. The lead single "Open Mind" received a simultaneous release alongside the EP on September 4; it was also accompanied by a music video.

== Critical reception ==
His participation in the writing, arrangement, and composition of many of the songs on the EP garnered praise for his overall musicality, as well as his diversity of style. In addition, the EP's bilingual songs and the participation of several international producers in its creation were noted as contributing to its global appeal.

== Commercial performance ==
It debuted at number one on the weekly Gaon Album Chart for the period of August 30 – September 5, and at number six on the monthly album chart for September with 143,655 copies sold.

== Track listing ==
Love Synonym Pt.1: Right for Me track listing
No.	Title	Lyrics	Music	Length
1.	"Open Mind"	Wonho; Lee Seu-ran	Corey Latif Williams; David Brook; Bryan Fryzel; Aaron Kleinstub	3:10
2.	"I Just"	Wonho; Savage House Gang; An Seon-yong; Post Gothic	Wonho; Savage House Gang; An Seon-yong; Post Gothic	2:54
3.	"Lost in Paradise"	Wonho; Savage House Gang; An Seon-yong; Post Gothic	Wonho; Savage House Gang; An Seon-yong; Post Gothic	3:45
4.	"Losing You" (Korean version)	Wonho; JQ; Kang Eun-yu; Seul-ri (makeumine)	Wonho; Corey Sanders; Jon Maguire; Neil Ormandy; Nick Gale	2:58
5.	"Interlude: Runway"	Wonho; Savage House Gang	Wonho; Savage House Gang	1:09
6.	"With You"	Jooyoung	$ÜN; Jooyoung; Bae Min-su	3:34
7.	"Open Mind" (English version)	Corey Latif Williams; David Brook; Bryan Fryzel; Aaron Kleinstub	Corey Latif Williams; David Brook; Bryan Fryzel; Aaron Kleinstub	3:10
8.	"Losing You"	Wonho; Corey Sanders; Jon Maguire; Neil Ormandy; Nick Gale	Wonho; Corey Sanders; Jon Maguire; Neil Ormandy; Nick Gale	2:58
Total length:				23:38

== Charts ==
=== Weekly charts ===
Weekly charts
Chart (2020)	Peak position
Japanese Albums (Oricon)	8
Polish Albums (ZPAV)	27
South Korean Albums (Gaon)	1
UK Album Downloads (OCC)	31
US Heatseekers Albums (Billboard)	19
US World Albums (Billboard)	9

=== Monthly chart ===
Monthly chart
Chart (2020)	Peak position
South Korean Albums (Gaon)	6

=== Year-end chart ===
Year-end chart
Chart (2020)	Position
South Korean Albums (Gaon)	59

== Sales ==
Sales
Region	Certification	Certified units/sales
South Korea	—	146,068
Japan	—	5,363

== Awards and nominations ==
Award ceremony	Year	Category	Result	Ref.
Golden Disc Awards	2021	Disc Bonsang	Nominated	

== Release history ==
Release dates and formats
Region	Date	Format	Label(s)	Ref.
South Korea	September 4, 2020	CD	Highline; Kakao M	
Various	September 4, 2020	Digital download; streaming	Intertwine	

== See also ==
- List of K-pop albums on the Billboard charts
- List of Gaon Album Chart number ones of 2020
