= Highline Entertainment =

South Korean record label

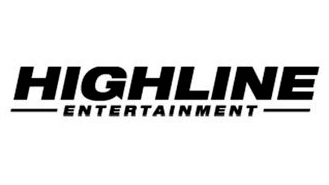
- Native name: 하이라인 엔터테인먼트
- Company type: Private
- Industry: Entertainment
- Genre: K-pop; Indie; Electronic
- Founded: October 24, 2017
- Founder: Shim Se-ran; Noh Seung-jin
- Headquarters: Gangnam-gu, Seoul, South Korea
- Key people: Shim Se-ran (CEO)
- Services: Music production; Publishing; Artists management
- Owner: Starship Entertainment
- Parent: Starship Entertainment

Highline Entertainment (Korean: 하이라인 엔터테인먼트) is a South Korean entertainment company founded in 2017 and a subsidiary of Starship Entertainment.

== History ==
In 2017, Starship Entertainment launched another subsidiary label House of Music, which focused on recruiting smaller, independent artists, with MoonMoon being the first signed under the label. In 2018, Starship renamed the label "Highline Entertainment".

In 2018, DJ Soda signed with Highline after "House of Music" was defunct.

In January 2019, Highline signed Jang Seok-hoon, previously a member of the hip hop scene super rookie Balming Tiger.

In April, Highline signed Mnet's High School Rapper 3 contestant PLUMA.

In 2020, Starship began expanding Highline, with a focus on artists who are prominent in subculture.

In April, they signed artist Wonho, previously a member of the boy group Monsta X, to the label, who debuted in September.

In September, they announced that singer Yoo Seung-woo had signed to the label. This moved him from Starship's acoustic sublabel "Starship Y", which brought that label to an end, as Yoo was the only artist on the label.

In August 2021, Highline sent You Da-yeon to participate in the survival program Girls Planet 999.

== Partnerships ==
- (Japan) Victor Entertainment
- (United States) Intertwine

== Artists ==
List adapted from official social media account.

- Wonho
- Leon
- DJ Vanto
- dress
- ROVXE
- Seungguk

== Former artists ==
- MoonMoon (2017–2018; contract terminated due to occlusion of a formal criminal record)
- DJ Soda (2018–2021)
- Lil Reta (2020–2022)
- Jang Seok-hoon (2019–2022)
- PLUMA (2019–2022)
- M1NU (2020–2022)
- Yoo Seung-woo (2020–2024)

== Awards ==
Name of the award ceremony, year presented, category, recipient of the award, and the result of the nomination
Award ceremony	Year	Category	Recipient	Result	Ref.
Soribada Best K-Music Awards	2019	Best Hip Hop Maker Award	dress	Won	
