= Kany (dancer) =

French and Senegalese dancer (born 1986)

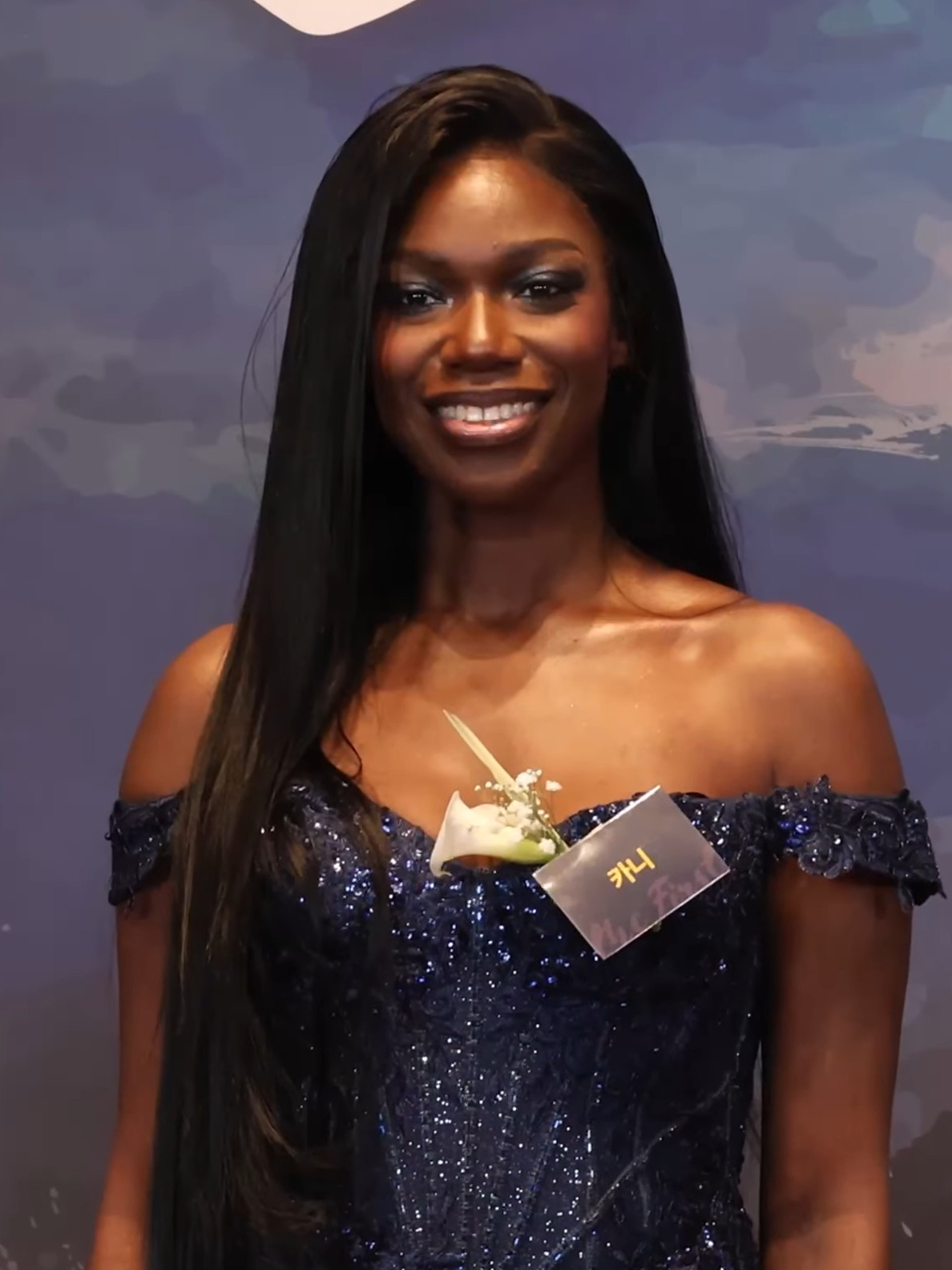
- Kany in 2026
- Born: Kany Diabaté; August 16, 1986 (age 40); Paris, France
- Occupations: Dancer; choreographer; entertainer
- Years active: 2015–present
- Agent: BPM Entertainment (2024–2025)
- Spouse: Ahn Dokuk (m. 2022)

Kany Diabaté Ahn (nee Diabaté, born August 16, 1986), known mononymously as Kany (Korean: 카니), is a French and Senegalese dancer, choreographer, and entertainer based in South Korea. After a career in Los Angeles performing for acts such as Michael Jackson, Beyoncé, Pharrell Williams, and Ariana Grande, she moved to South Korea in 2022 with her husband and began choreographing for K-pop acts such as Key, Viviz, and Badvillain. She was a master for the Mnet series Boys II Planet in 2025.

== Early life ==
Kany Diabaté was born on August 16, 1986, in Paris, France. Both of her parents are Senegalese, and her family had a career in the arts, so she began dancing at the age of five.

== Career ==
In 2015, she moved to Los Angeles to audition as a backing dancer for singer Beyoncé but was unsuccessful. She auditioned again in 2019 and was selected as a choreographer within two days, collaborating with Beyoncé on the choreography for "My Power" from the soundtrack album The Lion King: The Gift. She later performed as a dancer with musicians Pharrell Williams and Ariana Grande.

She first visited South Korea in 2018, prior to meeting her husband, and became enamored with the country, later moving there with her husband in 2022. Her first choreography in South Korea was for singer Key's song "Gasoline". At the suggestion of an acquaintance in charge of Shinee's choreography, she began doing K-pop choreography, later creating work for Jisoo's "Earthquake", Viviz's "Maniac," and Badvillain's "Badvillain". In January 2024, Kany signed an exclusive contract with BPM Entertainment to serve as a performance director, with the company stating that her bold style would help them explore new creative areas.

On June 5, 2025, it was announced that Kany would join the master lineup for the Mnet reality competition Boys II Planet as a Dance Master for the Planet K division. She and fellow entertainer Jonathan Yiombi participated in the Korea-Africa Foundation's 2025 Korea-Africa Youth Forum in September 2025. In November 2025, she went viral for making Korean adjectives such as maekkeunmaekkeunhada (매끈매끈하다; smooth) and ultungbultunghada (울퉁불퉁하다; rough) into a song and dancing along to it. In December 2025, BPM Entertainment announced that it had mutually terminated its exclusive contract with Kany.

On March 25, 2026, she interviewed BTS's J-Hope as part of her Gwang series and in connection with BTS's comeback. She was the choreographer for "Dai Dai", the official song from the 2026 FIFA World Cup.

== Artistry ==
Kany is inspired by African dance and music and has also explored hip hop and funk. Her role model is Michael Jackson.

== Endorsements ==
In April 2025, healthcare robotics company BodyFland launched the Health Life National Gymnastics campaign with Kany to promote national health, with Kany demonstrating movements to showcase the robot's dynamic capabilities.

== Personal life ==
Kany married Ahn Dokuk, a South Korean resident of the United States and former rock band member, in 2022, settling down in Ahn's hometown in South Korea. After the move, Ahn began working as a fruit wholesaler at Garak Market. She is close friends with Shinee member Key, appearing together multiple times on the television program I Live Alone, on which Key was a cast member until 2025. She is fluent in French, English, and Korean.

== Filmography ==
=== Television ===
Year	Title	Role	Notes
2025	Boys II Planet	Dance Master	Planet K division

== Awards ==
Year	Awards	Category	Ref.
2026	Korea First Brand Awards	Female Web Variety Program MC	

== External link ==
- Kany on Instagram
