= Andreas Öberg =

Swedish guitarist (born 1978)

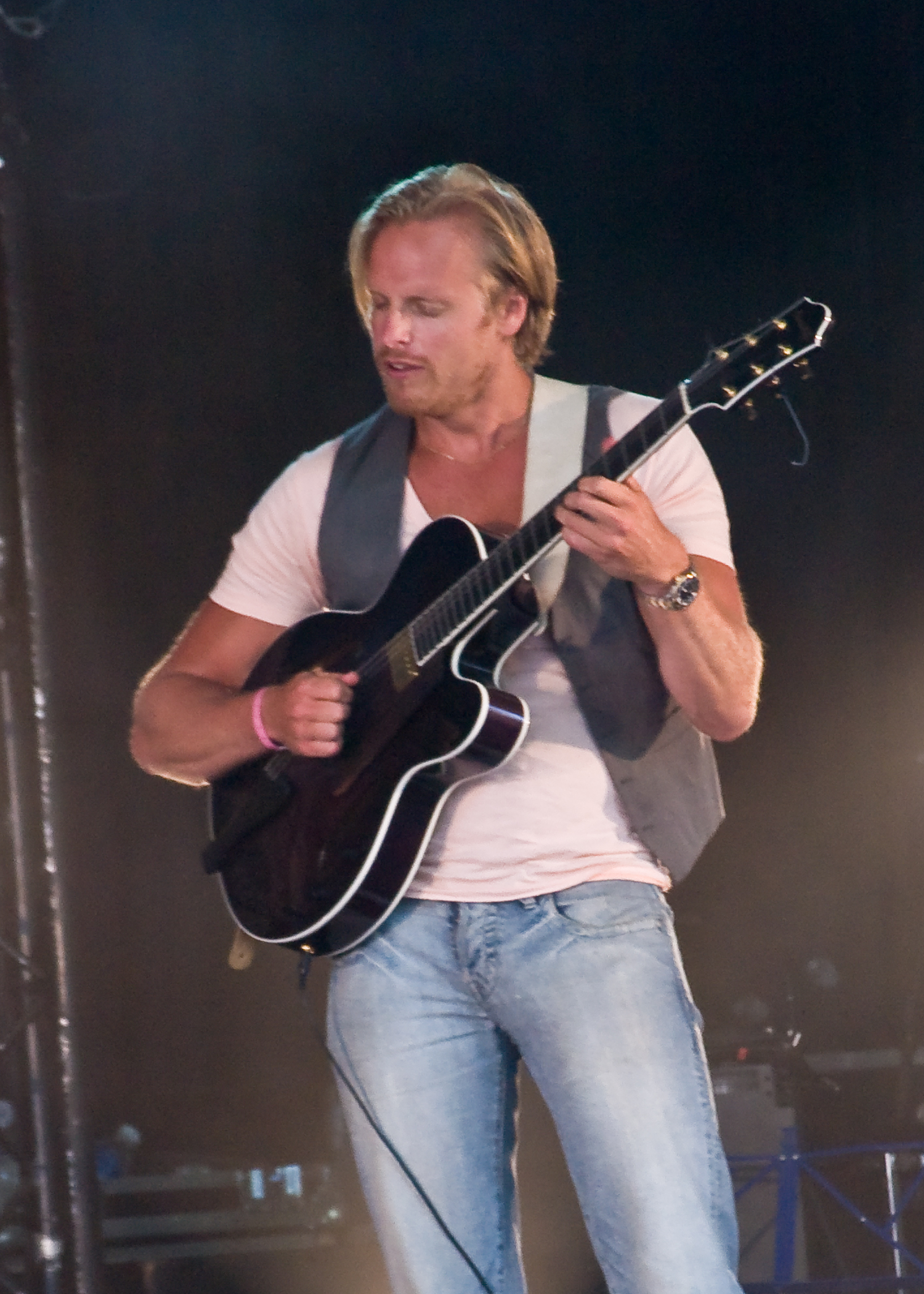
- Andreas Öberg in June 2009 in Samois-sur-Seine, north-central France

Background information
- Born: 6 August 1978 (age 48); Stockholm, Sweden
- Genres: Pop, jazz, soul
- Occupations: Musician, songwriter, record producer
- Instrument: Guitar
- Years active: 1997–present
- Label: Resonance
- Website: Official

Andreas Öberg (born 6 August 1978) is a Swedish guitarist, songwriter, and music producer.

== Music career ==
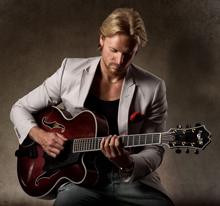
Öberg in 2008

Öberg was born in Stockholm on 6 August 1978. At the age of seven, he began taking classical guitar lessons at school. By He twelve, he started playing electric guitar, influence by a teacher who specialized in blues and jazz fusion. He later studied at the Royal College of Music in Stockholm.

He began his professional career at eighteen, collaborating with Viktoria Tolstoy and Svante Thuresson. Between 2003 and 2006 he recorded six albums for Hot Club Records produced by Jon Larsen featuring Jimmy Rosenberg, Marian Petrescu and others. In 2006, he signed with Resonance Records, describing his music at that time as a blend of jazz, funk, soul, Latin, and Brazilian music. He recorded with the Resonance Big Band on an album that received a Grammy Award nomination for Best Instrumental Arrangement. In 2009 he started a website, Andreas' Guitar Universe, where he offers online classes. He has worked with Barbara Hendricks, Hank Jones, Les Paul, Eros Ramazzotti, and Toots Thielemans.

Öberg was hired to write a song for a commercial that appeared on Swedish television. Since then he has composed for Universal Music. He wrote a song with Andreas Carlsson, who encouraged him to write lyrics in addition to music. As a songwriter Öberg has collaborated with Melanie Fontana and Ludwig Göransson. He has written and produced pop music for the Swedish, American, and Japanese markets.

In 2015 Shinee's album, Odd (including "Romance", co-written by Öberg), topped the Korean Gaon album chart for two consecutive weeks and the Billboard World Albums chart at the end of May 2015.

In May 2016, Namie Amuro released her single "Mint" where both the A- and B-sides ("Mint" and "Chit Chat") were co-written and co-produced by Öberg. The song sold more the 250,000 digital copies in Japan and was certified Platinum. In June 2016, Exo released their album Ex'Act, which included "Stronger", cowritten by Öberg. The album was the most sold in the world according to Global Album chart and has sold more than one million physical copies.

Öberg won the Hagström Guitar Award and the Gevalia Music Prize in 2004 and the International Guitar Competition Prize in Montreux in 2006. He has taught classes at the Musicians Institute in Hollywood.

== Discography ==
- Andreas Invites Yorgui & Ritary (Hot Club, 2004)
- Young Jazz Guitarist (Hot Club, 2005)
- Solo (Hot Club, 2006)
- Live in Concert (2006) (DVD)
- My Favorite Guitars (Resonance, 2008)
- Six String Evolution (Resonance, 2010)
- Thrivin' with Marian Petrescu (piano) (Résonance, 2010)
- Live (Hot Club, 2013)

== Notable writing credits ==
Year	Artist	Song	Appearance on album
2012	VIXX	"Starlight"	Super Hero
2012	Girls' Generation	"Stay Girls"	Girls & Peace
2013	Shinee	"Breaking News"	Boys Meet U
2013	NU'EST	"Beautiful Ghost"	Sleep Talking
2013	BoA	"Message"	Who's Back?
2013	VIXX	"B.O.D.Y"	Voodoo
2013	Girls' Generation	"Gossip Girls"	Love & Peace
2013	Girls' Generation	"Motorcycle"	Love & Peace
2013	Girls' Generation	"Do the Catwalk"	Love & Peace
2013	Girls' Generation	"Linguafranc"	Love & Peace
2014	After School	"Yes No Yes"	Dress to Kill
2014	After School	"in the moonlight"	Dress to Kill
2014	Shinee	"365"	I'm Your Boy
2014	Shinee	"Downtown Baby"	I'm Your Boy
2015	Cross Gene	"Amazing (Bad Lady)"	Play With Me
2015	Oh My Girl	"Hot Summer Nights"	Oh My Girl
2015	Oh My Girl	"Curious"	Oh My Girl
2015	Oh My Girl	"Say No More"	Closer
2015	Oh My Girl	"Round About"	Closer
2015	BoA	"Love and Hate"	Kiss My Lips
2015	BoA	"Smash"	Kiss My Lips
2015	BoA	"Lookbook"	Watashi Kono Mama de Ii no Kana
2015	Shinee	"Romance"	Odd
2015	Shinee	"Black Hole"	Odd
2015	Shinee	"Chocolate"	Married To The Music
2015	Gamaliel Audrey Cantika	"Terbang"	Stronger
2015	Gamaliel Audrey Cantika	"Cinta"	Stronger
2015	Super Junior	"Forever With You"	Devil
2015	F(x)	"Glitter"	4 Walls
2015	VIXX	"Stop it girl"	Chained Up
2015	Girls' Generation-TTS	"Dear Santa"	Dear Santa
2015	Girls' Generation-TTS	"Dear Santa (English Version)"	Dear Santa
2016	Oh My Girl	"B612"	Windy Day
2016	Oh My Girl	"Knock Knock"	Windy Day
2016	Oh My Girl	"Windy Day"	Windy Day
2016	Exo	"Stronger"	Ex'Act
2016	Exo	"Winter Heat"	For Life
2016	Exo	"Coming Over"	Countdown
2016	NCT 127	"Once Again"	NCT #127
2016	VIXX	"Butterfly Effect"	Hades
2016	Red Velvet	"One of These Nights"	The Velvet
2016	Red Velvet	"Sunny Afternoon"	Russian Roulette
2016	Shinee	"U Need Me"	1 of 1
2016	Shinee	"Beautiful Life"	1 and 1
2016	Shinee	"Wishful Thinking"	D×D×D
2016	Shinee	"Sweet Surprise"	D×D×D
2016	Shinee	"Sing Your Song"	D×D×D
2016	Twice	"One In A Million"	TWICEcoaster: Lane 1
2016	Arashi	"Two to Tango"	Are You Happy?
2016	Hyolyn	"One Step" (featuring Jay Park)	It's Me
2016	Momoland	"Love Sick"	Momoland The Best ~Korean Ver.~
2016	Momoland	"Welcome to Momoland"	Momoland The Best ~Korean Ver.~
2017	Shinee	"Gentleman"	Five
2017	Red Velvet	"Would U"	Non-album singles
2017	Arash	"Se Fue" (featuring Mohombi)	Non-album singles
2017	Oh My Girl	"Perfect Day"	Eternally
2017	Oh My Girl	"In My Dreams"	Eternally
2017	Oh My Girl	"Agit"	Eternally
2017	SF9	"Hide and Seek"	Breaking Sensation
2017	Exo-CBX	"Tornado Spiral"	Girls
2017	Exo-CBX	"Girl Problems"	Girls
2017	Taemin	"Flame of Love"	Taemin
2017	Taemin	"Door"	Taemin
2017	Loona	"Puzzle"	Choerry
2017	Girls' Generation	"Only One"	Holiday Night
2017	Monsta X	"Dramarama"	The Code
2017	Gugudan	"Snowball"	Act. 3 Chococo Factory
2017	Taeyeon	"Christmas Without You"	This Christmas: Winter Is Coming
2018	Oh My Girl	"Butterfly"	Secret Garden
2018	Oh My Girl	"Love O'clock"	Secret Garden
2018	Oh My Girl	"Magic"	Secret Garden
2018	SF9	"Midnight Road"	Mamma Mia!
2018	VIXX	"Scentist"	Eau de VIXX
2018	Exo-CBX	"Thursday"	Blooming Days
2018	Exo-CBX	"Playdate"	Blooming Days
2018	Super Junior	"Lo Siento" (featuring Leslie Grace)	Replay
2018	Monsta X	"#GFYL"	Piece
2018	Shinee	"Retro"	The Story of Light: Epilogue
2018	Gfriend	"Love In The Air"	Sunny Summer
2018	Super Junior-D&E	"Polygraph"	Style
2018	Super Junior-D&E	"Illusion (Obsessed)"	'Bout You
2018	Girls' Generation-Oh!GG	"Fermata"	Lil' Touch
2018	Yuri	"Butterfly"	The First Scene
2018	NCT 127	"No Longer"	Regular-Irregular
2018	Exo	"Drop That"	Countdown
2018	Exo	"Wait"	Love Shot
2018	BoA	"Mannish Chocolat"	Watashi Kono Mama de Ii no Kana
2018	NCT Dream	"Candle Light"	S.M. Station Season 3
2019	Monsta X	"Alligator"	Take.2 We Are Here
2019	Monsta X	"Swish"	Phenomenon
2019	Monsta X	"Follow"	Follow: Find You
2019	Monsta X	"Monsta Truck"	Follow: Find You
2019	NCT 127	"Wakey-Wakey"	Awaken
2019	Everglow	"Moon"	Arrival of Everglow
2019	Taeyeon	"I Found You"	Voice
2019	Pentagon	"Summer!"	Sum(me:r)
2019	Super Junior-D&E	"Jungle"	Danger
2019	Got7	"#Summervibes"	Love Loop
2019	Red Velvet	"Sappy"	Sappy
2019	Red Velvet	"Umpah Umpah"	The ReVe Festival: Day 2
2019	Red Velvet	"Ladies Night"	The ReVe Festival: Day 2
2019	Red Velvet	"La Rouge" (Special Track)	The ReVe Festival: Finale
2019	WayV	"King of Hearts"	Take Over the Moon
2019	Exo	"Non Stop"	Obsession
2019	Super Junior	"Super Clap"	Time_Slip
2020	Iz*One	"Eyes"	Bloom*Iz
2020	The Boyz	"Whiplash"	Chase
2020	SuperM	"So Long"	Super One
2020	SuperM	"Step Up"	Super One
2020	SuperM	"Better Days"	Super One
2020	Red Velvet - Irene & Seulgi	"Diamond"	Monster
2020	NCT	"Dancing in the Rain"	NCT 2020 Resonance
2020	Monster X	"Gasoline"	Fatal Love
2021	Baekhyun	"Disappeared"	Baekhyun
2021	The Boyz	"Hush"	Breaking Dawn
2021	Exo	"No Matter"	Don't Fight the Feeling
2021	Red Velvet	"Better Be"	Queendom
2021	D.O.	"Si Fueras Mia"	Empathy
2021	D.O.	"It’s Love"	Empathy
2021	MCND	"H.B.C"	The Earth: Secret Mission
2021	NCT 127	"Breakfast"	Sticker
2022	Viviz	"Lemonade"	Beam of Prism
2022	Viviz	"Siesta"	Summer Vibe
2022	Taeyeon	"Some Nights"	INVU
2022	Red Velvet	"Feel My Rhythm"	The ReVe Festival 2022 – Feel My Rhythm
2022	Red Velvet	"Bamboleo"	The ReVe Festival 2022 – Feel My Rhythm
2022	Girls' Generation	"Seventeen"	Forever 1
2022	SF9	"Scream"	The Wave of9
2022	ATBO	"The Way"	The Beginning: 始作
2022	INI	"Dramatic"	Awakening
2022	NCT 127	"Playback"	2 Baddies
2023	NCT 127	"DJ"	Ay-Yo
2023	Viviz	"Love or Die"	Various
2023	Viviz	"Day by Day"	Versus
2023	Octpath	"Hot Thoughts"	Showcase
2023	Got the Beat	"Mala"	Stamp on It
2023	Aespa	"'Til We Meet Again"	My World
2023	Shinee	"10X"	Hard
2023	El7z Up	"Cheeky"	7+Up
2023	INI	"Tag"	Tag Me
2023	MCND	"Pop Star"	Odd-Venture
2023	MCND	"W.A.T.1" (English ver.)	Odd-Venture
2023	Mave:	"Milkshake"	What's My Name
2024	N.SSign	"Funk Jam"	Happy &
2024	Little Glee Monster	"Wonder Lover"	Unlock!
2024	Zerobaseone	"Sunday Ride"	You Had Me at Hello
2024	Seventeen	"Maestro"	17 Is Right Here
2024	Seventeen	"1 to 13"	Spill the Feels
2024	TWS	"First Hooky"	Sparkling Blue
2024	INI	"I'm a Dreamer (From The First Take)"	Non-album single
2024	&Team	"Illumination"	Yukiakari
2024	&Team	"Maybe"	Yukiakari
2024	Rescene	"Pinball"	Scenedrome
2025	Rescene	"Mood"	Non-album single
2025	HxW	"96ers"	Beam
2025	Zerobaseone	"Star Eyes"	Never Say Never
2025	CxM	"Fiesta"	Hype Vibes
2026	Dodree	"Born"	Just Like a Dream
2026	Skinz	"Poison Ivy"	Skinz is Skinz
2026	Billlie	"Secret No More"	The Collective Soul and Unconscious: Chapter Two
