= Follow: Find You =

EP by Monsta X
- Released: October 28, 2019
- Genre: K-pop
- Length: 28:15
- Language: Korean
- Label: Starship; Kakao M

Monsta X chronology
Phenomenon (2019)	Follow: Find You (2019)	All About Luv (2020)

Singles from Follow: Find You
- 1. "Find You" Released: October 22, 2019; 2. "Follow" Released: October 28, 2019

Follow: Find You is the seventh extended play by the South Korean boy group Monsta X. It was released by Starship Entertainment and distributed by Kakao M on October 28, 2019. It consists of eight tracks, including the title track "Follow".

== Background and release ==
The EP had two lead singles, with "Find You" pre-released on October 22 and "Follow" released with the EP on October 28. It was also Monsta X's final release that member Wonho participated in the promotion of before his departure from the group on October 31.

The EP was released in four versions.

== Critical reception ==
"Follow" was noted for its use of traditional Korean inspired elements, in both the song and music video, including hanbok-inspired outfits and the use of the taepyeongso. It was described by Tamar Herman of Billboard as "an explosive dance track tinged with EDM breakdowns and moombahton-inspired beats".

Jeff Benjamin of Billboard called the EP a return "to a lighter and fun sound" for the group following their "darker" albums Take.1 Are You There? and Take.2 We Are Here. Benjamin felt it was exemplified, by the first track "Find You", which he described as a "serene, synth ballad", as well as their dynamic title track "Follow", which he compared to the group's hit track "Hero". He went on to note "Monsta Truck" as a "blend of smooth groove and industrial breakdowns", "Disaster" as "a bare-bone boom-bap production, that allows the rappers Joohoney and I.M's aggressive delivery to shine", "U R" as an "acoustic-leaning R&B cut", and "Mirror" with its "warm, brassy production". Michael Cerio of Radio.com also added that the group "finds a balance between ballads and bangers, exploring the connection they share with each other and adding another chapter of tunes to the tale", summarizing the whole EP as "bouncing between immersive ballads and pulse-quickening jams that snap expectations" and "the sound of K-pop secure in its sound".

=== Listicles ===
Name of critic or publication, name of listicle, name of work and rank
Critic/Publication	List	Work	Rank	Ref.
Album
Billboard	The 25 Best K-pop Albums of 2019	Follow: Find You	17	
Song
Dazed	The 20 Best K-pop Songs of 2019	"Follow"	17	
Refinery29	The Best K-pop Songs of 2019	"Follow"	23	
SBS PopAsia	Top 100 Asian Pop Songs of 2019	"Follow"	21	

== Commercial performance ==
The EP is certified platinum in South Korea, with 266,819 units sold as of 2021. It peaked at number one on the weekly Gaon Album Chart.

The pre-release single "Find You" and lead single "Follow" both charted on the Billboard World Digital Song Sales chart, at number twenty-one and five, respectively, as with the song "Mirror", peaking at number twenty. While they did not appear on the Gaon Digital Chart, all the tracks on the EP appeared on its component chart, the Gaon Download Chart, with "Find You" peaking at 142, "Follow" at 52, "Monsta Truck" at 182, "U R" at 184, "Disaster" at 195, "Burn It Up" at 189, "See You Again" at 190, and "Mirror" at 196. It had two music show wins on The Show and M Countdown.

== Track listing ==
Follow: Find You track listing
No.	Title	Lyrics	Music	Arrangement	Length
1.	"Find You"	Brother Su; Juno	$ün; Jooyoung; $aimön	$ün; $aimön	3:38
2.	"Follow"	Seo Ji-eum; Brother Su; Joohoney; I.M	Daniel Kim; Willie Weeks; Andreas Öberg; Skylar Mones	Willie Weeks	3:33
3.	"Monsta Truck"	Brother Su; Joohoney; I.M	Daniel Caesar; Ludwig Lindell; Andreas Öberg	Caesar & Loui	3:40
4.	"U R"	I.M; Yoonseok; Wooki; Joohoney	I.M; Yoonseok; Wooki	I.M; Yoonseok; Wooki	3:30
5.	"Disaster"	Ji-in (Flying Lab); Joohoney; I.M	Albin Nordqvist; Andrew Choi; Bintage	Albin Nordqvist	3:39
6.	"Burn It Up"	JQ (Makeumine Works); Bono (Makeumine Works); Joohoney; I.M	Daniel Caesar; Ludwig Lindell; Daniel Kim; Jiyeon Park	Daniel Caesar; Ludwig Lindell	3:38
7.	"Mirror"	Wonho; Brother Su; Joohoney; I.M	Wonho; Brother Su; Ahn Sang-hyeon (Punch Sound); Shin Ki-hyun (Punch Sound)	Ahn Sang-hyeon (Punch Sound); Shin Ki-hyun (Punch Sound)	3:20
8.	"See You Again"	Joohoney; 9F; I.M	Joohoney; 9F	Joohoney; 9F	3:17
Total length:					28:15

== Charts ==
=== Album ===
==== Weekly charts ====
Chart performance for Follow: Find You
Chart (2019)	Peak position
French Download Albums (SNEP)	95
Japan Hot Albums (Billboard Japan)	44
Japanese Albums (Oricon)	9
Polish Albums (ZPAV)	37
South Korean Albums (Gaon)	1
US Heatseekers Albums (Billboard)	15
US Independent Albums (Billboard)	42
US World Albums (Billboard)	7

==== Monthly chart ====
Chart performance for Follow: Find You
Chart (2019)	Peak position
South Korean Albums (Gaon)	2

==== Year-end chart ====
Chart performance for Follow: Find You
Chart (2019)	Position
South Korean Albums (Gaon)	24

=== Songs ===
==== Weekly charts ====
Chart performance for "Find You"
Chart (2019)	Peak position
US World Digital Song Sales (Billboard)	21

Chart performance for "Follow"
Chart (2019)	Peak position
Japan Hot 100 (Billboard Japan)	68
South Korea (K-pop Hot 100)	96
US World Digital Song Sales (Billboard)	5

Chart performance for "Mirror"
Chart (2021)	Peak position
US World Digital Song Sales (Billboard)	20

== Certification and sales ==
Certification and sales for Follow: Find You
Region	Certification	Certified units/Sales
South Korea (KMCA)	Platinum	266,819
Japan	—	9,785
United States	—	1,000

== Accolades ==
Music program award for "Follow"
Program	Date (2 total)	Ref.
M Countdown	November 7, 2019	
The Show	November 5, 2019	

== Awards and nominations ==
Name of the award ceremony, year presented, award category, nominated work and the result of the nomination
Award ceremony	Year	Category	Nominated work	Result	Ref.
Gaon Chart Music Awards	2020	Album of the Year – 4th Quarter	Follow: Find You	Nominated	

== Release history ==
Release history and formats for Follow: Find You
Region	Date	Format	Label
South Korea	October 28, 2019	CD; digital download; streaming	Starship Entertainment; Kakao M
Various	October 28, 2019	Digital download; streaming	Starship Entertainment; Kakao M

== See also ==
- List of certified albums in South Korea
- List of Gaon Album Chart number ones of 2019
- List of K-pop albums on the Billboard charts
- List of K-pop songs on the Billboard charts
- List of K-pop songs on the World Digital Song Sales chart
