= Bop Bop! =

- Yves V remix cover

Single by Viviz

from the EP Beam of Prism
- Language: Korean
- Released: February 9, 2022
- Genre: Dance-pop
- Length: 3:39
- Label: BPM; Kakao
- Composers: Lim Soo-ho (PaperMaker); Woong Kim (PaperMaker); Anna Timgren; PaperMaker
- Lyricists: Hwang Yu-bin; Mi Lee-mu (PaperMaker)

Viviz singles chronology
"Bop Bop!" (2022)	"Loveade" (2022)

Music video
- "Bop Bop!" on YouTube

"Bop Bop!" (stylized in all caps) is a song recorded by South Korean girl group Viviz for their debut extended play Beam of Prism. It was released as the lead single by BPM Entertainment on February 9, 2022. "Bop Bop!" was written by Hwang Yu-bin and Mi Lee-mu (PaperMaker), composed by Lim Soo-ho (PaperMaker), Woong Kim (PaperMaker), Anna Timgren, and PaperMaker, and arranged by Lim Soo-ho (PaperMaker) and Woong Kim (PaperMaker).

== Background and release ==
On October 6, 2021, it was announced that Eunha, SinB, and Umji, who were former members of GFriend, has signed with BPM Entertainment and would be debuting as a trio. On January 24, 2022, BPM Entertainment announced the trio would be making their debut on February 9, 2022, with the release of their first extended play Beam of Prism. On February 2, the track listing was released with "Bop Bop!" announced as the lead single. Four days later, the highlight teaser video was released. On February 7, the first music video teaser was released. On April 28, Viviz released remixes of "Bop Bop!" in collaboration with Belgian DJ Yves V.

== Composition ==
"Bop Bop!" was written by Hwang Yu-bin and Mi Lee-mu (PaperMaker), composed and arranged by Lim Soo-ho (PaperMaker), Woong Kim (PaperMaker), with PaperMaker with Anna Timgren. The song was described as a "hybrid" pop dance song with "Latin-style rhythm and disco [rhythm]" with lyrics about "[the group's] aspiration to enjoy music". "Bop Bop!" was composed in the key of C major, with a tempo of 126 beats per minute.

== Commercial performance ==
"Bop Bop!" debuted at number 114 on South Korea's Gaon Digital Chart in the chart issue dated February 6–12, 2022. It ascended to number 102 on the Gaon Digital Chart in the following week. On the Billboard K-pop Hot 100, the song debuted at number 78 in the chart issue dated February 26, 2022, ascending to number 60 in the chart issue dated March 19, 2022. In United States, the song debuted at number five on the Billboard World Digital Song Sales in the chart issue dated May 14, 2022.

== Promotion ==
Prior to the extended play's release, on February 9, 2022, Viviz held a debut showcase to introduce Beam of Prism along with its lead single "Bop Bop!". Following the release of the extended play, the group performed "Bop Bop!" on two music programs: Mnet's M Countdown on February 10, and on February 17 where they won the first place, and SBS's Inkigayo on February 20. On April 27, Viviz performed "Bop Bop!" at The Recording Academy's Grammy Global Spin.

== Track listing ==
- Digital download / streaming – Original
1. "Bop Bop!" – 3:39
- Digital download / streaming – Yves V remix
1. "Bop Bop!" (Yves V remix) – 3:12
2. "Bop Bop!" (Yves V remix extended) – 4:12
3. "Bop Bop!" (Yves V remix instrumental) – 4:12

== Accolades ==
Year-end lists for "Bop Bop!"
Critic/Publication	List	Rank	Ref.
The Telegraph	Top 20 K-Pop Hits of the Year	10	

== Credits and personnels ==
- Hwang Yu-bin – lyrics
- Mi Lee-mu (PaperMaker) – lyrics
- Lim Soo-ho (PaperMaker) – composition, arrangement
- Woong Kim (PaperMaker) – composition, arrangement
- Anna Timgren – composition
- PaperMaker – composition, arrangement

== Charts ==
=== Weekly chart ===
Weekly chart performance for "Bop Bop!"
Chart (2022)	Peak position
South Korea (Gaon)	102
South Korea (K-pop Hot 100)	60
US World Digital Song Sales (Billboard)	5

=== Monthly charts ===
Monthly chart performance for "Bop Bop!"
Chart (2022)	Position
South Korea (Gaon)	129

== Accolades ==
Music program awards
Program	Network	Date	Ref.
M Countdown	Mnet	February 17, 2022	
Show Champion	MBC M	February 16, 2022	

== Release history ==
Release history for "Bop Bop!"
Region	Date	Format	Label
Various	February 9, 2022	Digital download; streaming	BPM; Kakao
Various	April 28, 2022	Digital download; streaming	The Unit Label; Syndicate; BPM
