= A Montage of ( ) =

- Digital cover

Studio album by Viviz
- Released: July 8, 2025
- Genre: K-pop
- Length: 26:58
- Language: Korean
- Labels: BPM; Kakao

Viviz chronology
Voyage (2024)	A Montage of ( ) (2025)

Singles from A Montage of ( )
- 1. "La La Love Me" Released: July 8, 2025

Professional ratings
Review scores
Source	Rating
IZM	2/5 stars

A Montage of ( ) is the debut studio album by South Korean girl group Viviz. It was released by BPM Entertainment on July 8, 2025, and contains nine tracks, including the lead single "La La Love Me".

== Background and release ==
On June 16, 2025, BPM Entertainment announced that Viviz would be releasing their first studio album titled A Montage of ( ) on July 8. On the next day, the schedule poster for the album's promotion was released. The tracklist for the album was revealed on June 20, with the lead single announced to be titled "La La Love Me". On July 2, the album preview video was released, showcasing highlights of all nine tracks. The album was released on July 8, alongside the music video for "La La Love Me".

== Track listing ==
A Montage of ( ) track listing
No.	Title	Lyrics	Music	Arrangement	Length
1.	"La La Love Me"	Seo Ga-eul (Inhouse); Alphabet (153/Joombas); Kim Sung-gyung (XYXX); Jonjon (XYXX); Rizin (153/Joombas); Uyeon (Inhouse); Ludwig Lindell; Daniel Caesar; Paulina "Pau" Cerrilla; Josefin Glenmark	Ludwig Lindell; Daniel Caesar; Paulina "Pau" Cerrilla; Josefin Glenmark	Caesar & Loui	3:05
2.	"Hands Off My Heart"	Newny (Inhouse)	Doplamingo; Zarah Christenson; Nina Sundstrom	Doplamingo	2:48
3.	"Citrus"	Goo Yeo-reum	Vangdale	Vangdale	2:39
4.	"Sticker"	Colde; Yukon; Milena; Paft Dunk	Colde; Basecamp; The Fridge Club; Paft Dunk	Colde; Basecamp; The Fridge Club	3:17
5.	"Toxic"	Kim Sung-gyung (XYXX); 3! (Lalala Studio); Hwang Soo-min (Artiffect); Jonjon (XYXX); Alicia Haynes	EastWest; Yuka (Avec); Madewell (Avec); Hui-yeon (Avec); Ley (Avec); Rosesia; Alicia Haynes	Yuka (Avec); Madewell (Avec)	3:15
6.	"Hipnotic" (SinB solo)	Bay (153/Joombas); Jeon Se-hee (153/Joombas); Kim Sang-eun (Jamfactory); Hyezin (Esmp); Rizin (153/Joombas); Christopher Smith; Lauren Amber Aquilina; Louise Udin	Lauren Amber Aquilina; Louise Udin; Risc		2:26
7.	"Love Language" (Umji solo)	Umji; Alina Smith; Annalise Morelli; Elsa Curran	Alina Smith (153/Joombas, Lyre); Annalise Morelli (153/Joombas, Lyre); Elsa Curran	Alina Smith (Lyre)	3:10
8.	"Milky Way" (Eunha solo)	Goo Sam-young (153/Joombas); Eunha	Frants; Eunha; Park Moon-chi; 1Zone	Frants	2:54
9.	"Wildflower"	Jo Yoon-kyung	Humbler; Rokman; Samuil (Decade+); Sika (Decade+); Christie-Jade Mananga Makayabo	Humbler	3:24
Total length:					26:58

== Charts ==
=== Weekly charts ===
Weekly chart performance for A Montage of ( )
Chart (2025)	Peak position
South Korean Albums (Circle)	7

=== Monthly charts ===
Monthly chart performance for A Montage of ( )
Chart (2025)	Position
South Korean Albums (Circle)	18

== Release history ==
Release history for A Montage of ( )
Region	Date	Format	Label
South Korea	July 8, 2025	CD	BPM; Kakao
Various	July 8, 2025	Digital download; streaming	BPM; Kakao
