= Loveade =

Single by Viviz

from the EP Summer Vibe
- Language: Korean
- Released: July 6, 2022
- Genre: Dance-pop
- Length: 3:38
- Label: BPM; Swing; Kakao
- Composers: Deez (Soultriii & Amplified); Saay (Soultriii)
- Lyricists: Hwang Yu-bin; Deez (Soultriii & Amplified); Saay (Soultriii)

Viviz singles chronology
"Bop Bop!" (2022)	"Loveade" (2022)	"Pull Up" (2023)

Music video
- "Loveade" on YouTube

"Loveade" is a song recorded by South Korean girl group Viviz for their second extended play Summer Vibe. It was released as the EP's lead single by BPM Entertainment on July 6, 2022.

== Background and release ==
On June 23, 2022, BPM Entertainment announced Viviz would be releasing their second extended play titled Summer Vibe on July 6. Three days later, the track listing was released with "Loveade" announced as the lead single. The music video teaser was released on July 4 and 5.

== Composition ==
"Loveade" was written, composed, and arranged by Deez (Soultriii & Amplified) and Saay (Soultriii) alongside Hwang Yu-bin for the lyrics. It was described as dance-pop song with "funky and retro vibe" with lyrics that "compares the love of two people to a refreshing ade". "Loveade" was composed in the key of C-sharp major with a tempo of 114 beats per minute.

== Commercial performance ==
"Loveade" debuted at number 191 on South Korea's Circle Digital Chart in the chart issue dated July 10–16, 2022.

== Promotion ==
Following the release of Summer Vibe, Viviz held a live showcase on the same day to introduce the extended play and its song, including "Loveade", and to communicate with their fans. The group subsequently performed on four music programs in the first week: Mnet's M Countdown on July 7, KBS's Music Bank on July 8, MBC's Show! Music Core on July 9, and SBS's Inkigayo on July 10. On the second and final week of promotion, the group performed on five music programs: SBS MTV's The Show on July 12, M Countdown on July 14, Music Bank on July 15, Show! Music Core on July 16, and Inkigayo on July 17.

== Charts ==
Weekly chart performance for "Loveade"
Chart (2022)	Peak position
South Korea (Circle)	191

== Release history ==
Release history for "Loveade"
Region	Date	Format	Label
Various	July 6, 2022	Digital download; streaming	BPM; Swing; Kakao
