= Badvillain =

South Korean girl group

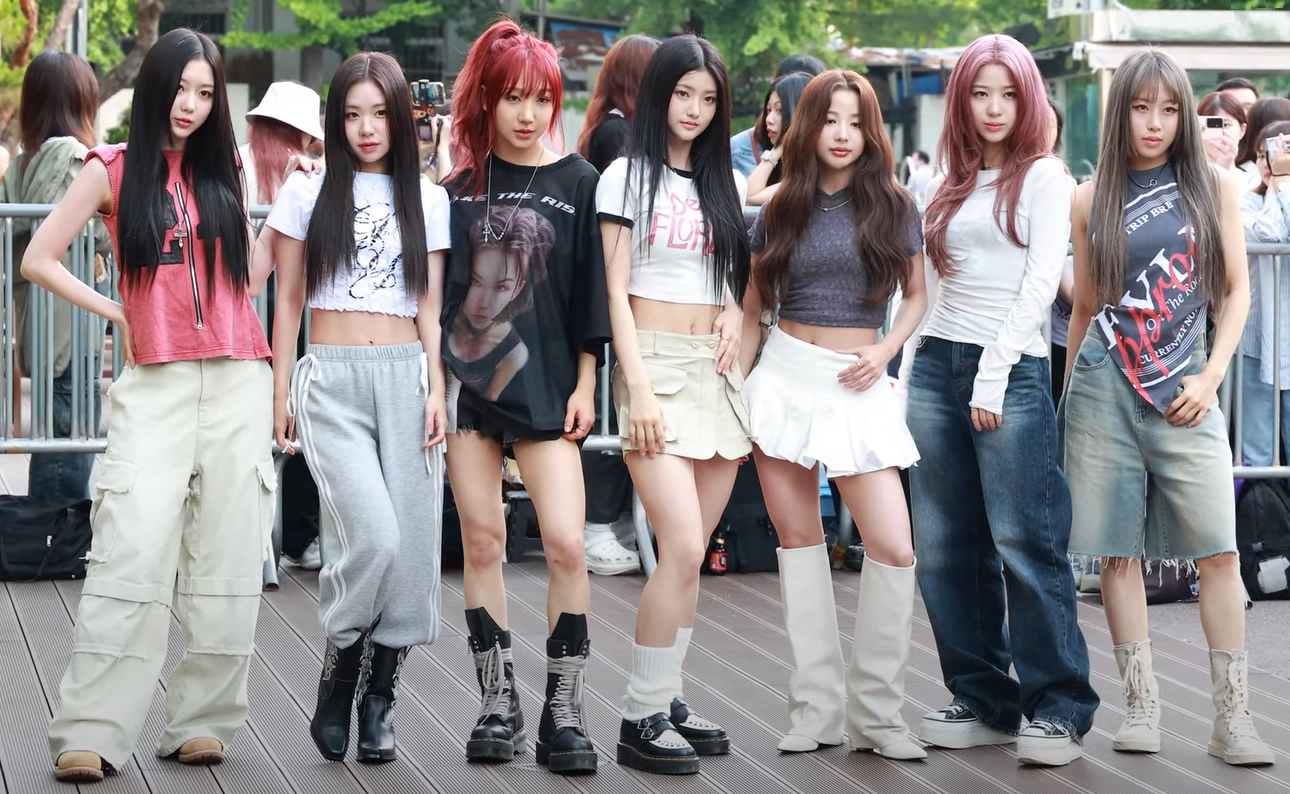
- Badvillain in June 2024; L-R Yunseo, Hu'e, Emma, Kelly, Chloe Young, Vin, Ina

Background information
- Origin: Seoul, South Korea
- Genre: K-pop
- Years active: 2024–present
- Label: BPM
- Members: Emma; Chloe Young; Hu'e; Ina; Yunseo; Vin; Kelly

Badvillain (Korean: 배드빌런; stylized in all caps) is a South Korean girl group formed by BPM Entertainment. The group consists of seven members: Emma, Chloe Young, Hu'e, Ina, Yunseo, Vin, and Kelly. They made their debut on June 3, 2024, with their single album Overstep.

== History ==
=== 2021–2024: Pre-debut and formation ===
Some members have previously been involved in the entertainment industry prior to joining the group. Hu'e and Yunseo were contestants on the MBC survival show My Teenage Girl. Emma was known for participating in Street Woman Fighter. Chloe Young was a member of dance crew 1Million.

=== 2024-2025: Debut with Overstep ===
In April 2024, BPM Entertainment revealed they would be launching their first girl group composed of their own trainees, having debuted Viviz two years prior with former members of Gfriend. In May, they began sharing teasers, with the group due to debut in the first half of 2024. Two dance videos were released for songs "Hurricane" and "+82", revealing a lineup of seven members but not yet confirming their names.

On June 3, the group made their debut with the release of single album Overstep, with the lead single "Badvillain", the previously teased "+82", and another unreleased song "Baditude". The music video for the lead single exceeded 10 million views 17 hours after its release, the fastest for a 2024 girl group debut. "Badvillain" is a bass hip-hop dance song. Lyrically, it conveys the message of advancing towards a goal reflecting personal desires rather than other people's opinions. In a review for IZM, Kim Tae-hoon praised the rapping in the first half of the song but said that "as it approaches the second half, it loses its balance due to variations that border on overindulgence". Kim commented that it displays Badvillain's style but fails to stand out from other girl crush releases. BPM later confirmed that "Hurricane" would be commercially released, first on Korean platforms on June 24 then global platforms on June 26. "Hurricane" is a trap hip-hop song that incorporates synthesizers and heavy bass. On September 15, 2025, Badvillain released the single "Thriller".

== Members ==
- Emma (엠마)
- Chloe Young (클로이영)
- Hu'e (휴이)
- Ina (이나)
- Yunseo (윤서)
- Vin (빈)
- Kelly (켈리)

== Discography ==
=== Single albums ===
List of albums, showing selected details, selected chart positions, and sales figures
| Title | Details | Peak chart positions | Sales |
| Title | Details | KOR | Sales |
|---|---|---|---|
| Overstep | Released: June 3, 2024; Label: BPM; Formats: CD, digital download, streaming | 38 | KOR: 5,367 |

=== Singles ===
List of singles, with showing year released, selected chart positions and album name
| Title | Year | Peak chart positions | Album |
| Title | Year | KOR Down. | Album |
|---|---|---|---|
| "Badvillain" | 2024 | 41 | Overstep |
| "Hurricane" | 2024 | 104 | Non-album single |
| "Zoom" | 2024 | 77 | Non-album single |
| "Thriller" | 2025 | 120 | Non-album single |

=== Other charted songs ===
List of songs, with showing year released, selected chart positions and album name
| Title | Year | Peak chart positions | Album |
| Title | Year | KOR Down. | Album |
|---|---|---|---|
| "Yah-Ho (Badtitude)" (야호) | 2024 | 160 | Overstep |
| "+82" | 2024 | 157 | Overstep |

== Videography ==
=== Music videos ===
| Title | Year | Director(s) | Ref. |
|---|---|---|---|
| "Badvillain" | 2024 | 이호진 | |
| "야호(BADTITUDE)" | 2024 | Unknown | |
| "Zoom" | 2024 | Unknown | |
| "Hurricane" | 2024 | Sunny Visual | |
| "Thriller" | 2025 | Unknown | |

=== Other videos ===
| Title | Year | Director(s) | Ref. |
|---|---|---|---|
| "Hurricane" Performance Video | 2024 | Unveil | |
| "+82" Performance Video | 2024 | Unveil | |
