= Summer Vibe =

- Digital cover

EP by Viviz
- Released: July 6, 2022
- Length: 19:58
- Language: Korean
- Labels: BPM; Swing; Kakao

Viviz chronology
| Beam of Prism (2022) | Summer Vibe (2022) | Various (2023) |

Singles from Summer Vibe
- 1. "Loveade" Released: July 6, 2022

Summer Vibe is the second extended play by South Korean girl group Viviz. The EP was released by BPM Entertainment on July 6, 2022, and contains six tracks, including the lead single "Loveade".

== Composition and lyrics ==
Song "Siesta" is described as a pop dance song with 90s style guitar riffs.Song "love love love" was produced as a song in an uptempo deep house genre. Song "#flashback" was produced as an urban R&B song in a new jack swing vibe with retro synth pads, with metaphors associated with hashtags. Song "dance" is described as a ballad track adorned with minimalist instruments and "spatial effectors". (Note: It is a Korean music industry term burrowed from japlish Kūkan-kei efekutā(空間系エフェクター), referring to effects unit controlling time effects such as reverbs and delays, to give spatial echo effects that are present in places such as cathedrals))

== Background and release ==
On June 23, 2022, BPM Entertainment announced Viviz would be releasing their second extended play titled Summer Vibe on July 6. Two days later, the promotional schedule was released. On June 26, the track listing was released with "Loveade" announced as the lead single. On July 1, the first mood sampler video titled "Flying Point version" was released, followed by a second mood sampler video titled "Ready to Summer version" a day later. On July 3, the album preview teaser video was released. The music video teaser for "Loveade" was released on July 4 and 5.

== Promotion ==
Following the release of Summer Vibe, Viviz held a live showcase on the same date to introduce the extended play and communicate with their fans.

== Track listing ==
Track listing for Summer Vibe
| No. | Title | Lyrics | Music | Arrangement | Length |
|---|---|---|---|---|---|
| 1. | "Loveade" | Hwang Yu-bin; Deez (Soultriii & Amplified); Saay (Soultriii) | Deez (Soultriii & Amplified); Saay (Soultriii) | Deez (Soultriii & Amplified) | 3:38 |
| 2. | "Siesta" | Lee Seu-ran | Tommy Park; Antti Oikarinen; Andreas Öberg; Maria Marcus | Antti Oikarinen; Tommy Park | 2:59 |
| 3. | "Party Pop" | Jo Yoon-kyung | Caroline Gustavsson; Joe Chen; Avenue 52 | Joe Chen | 3:18 |
| 4. | "Love Love Love" | C'SA (Note: The name of Shin sia as a producer, who was a former contestant in the audition shows Finding Momoland and Idol School.) | Dani; C'SA | Dani | 3:23 |
| 5. | "#Flashback" | Ellie Suh (153/Joombas) | Deez (Soultriii & Amplified); Daniel "Obi" Klein; Charli Taft | Deez (Soultriii & Amplified); Daniel "Obi" Klein | 3:25 |
| 6. | "Dance" (춤) | Hwang Hyun (MonoTree) | Hwang Hyun (MonoTree); Elijah Baker | Hwang Hyun (MonoTree); Elijah Baker | 3:15 |
| Total length: | | | | | 19:58 |

== Charts ==
=== Weekly charts ===
Chart performance for Summer Vibe
| Chart (2022) | Peak position |
|---|---|
| Japanese Albums (Oricon) | 45 |
| South Korean Albums (Circle) | 8 |

=== Monthly charts ===
Monthly chart performance for Summer Vibe
| Chart (2022) | Peak position |
|---|---|
| South Korean Albums (Circle) | 18 |

== Release history ==
Release history for Summer Vibe
| Region | Date | Format | Label |
|---|---|---|---|
| South Korea | July 6, 2022 | CD | BPM; Swing; Kakao |
| Various | July 6, 2022 | Digital download; streaming | BPM; Swing; Kakao |
