= Beam of Prism =

- Digital cover

EP by Viviz
- Released: February 9, 2022
- Genre: K-pop
- Length: 21:59
- Language: Korean
- Label: BPM; Kakao

Viviz chronology
| Beam of Prism (2022) | Summer Vibe (2022) |

Singles from Beam of Prism
- 1. "Bop Bop!" Released: February 9, 2022

Beam of Prism is the debut extended play by South Korean girl group Viviz. It consists of seven tracks, including the lead single "Bop Bop!". The extended play was released by BPM Entertainment on February 9, 2022.

== Background and release ==
On October 6, 2021, it was announced that Eunha, SinB, and Umji, who were former members of GFriend, has signed with BPM Entertainment and would be debuting as a trio. On January 24, 2022, BPM Entertainment announced the trio would be making their debut on February 9, 2022, with the release of their first extended play Beam of Prism. Two days later, the promotional schedule was released. On January 29, the mood sampler video was released. On February 2, the track listing was released with "Bop Bop!" announced as the lead single. Four days later, the highlight teaser video was released. The music video teasers for "Bop Bop!" were released on February 7 and 8.

== Composition ==
"Bop Bop!" was described as a "hybrid" pop dance song with "latin-style rhythm and disco [rhythm]" with lyrics about "[the group's] aspiration to enjoy music". "Fiesta" was described as a "retro" pop song with "light atmosphere". "Tweet Tweet" was described as a song with "bold lyrics" characterized by "impressive, unique, and fun [rhythm]". "Lemonade" was described as a R&B song with "[rhythm] that are reminiscent of [the] 90s". "Love You Like" was described as a song in the alternative pop genre with "repetitive chorus" characterized by "the members' simple vocals" with lyrics about "the members' gratitude and love to [their] long-awaited fans". Umji also participated in writing of "Love You Like". "Mirror" was described as a song with "emotional orchestral arrangements and lyrical melodies".

== Commercial performance ==
Beam of Prism debuted at number two on South Korea's Gaon Album Chart in the chart issue dated February 6–12, 2022; on the monthly chart, the extended play debuted at number eight in the chart issue for February 2022 with 50,000 copies sold. In Japan, the extended play debuted number 42 on the Oricon Albums Chart in the chart issue dated February 28, 2022.

== Track listing ==
Track listing for Beam of Prism
| No. | Title | Lyrics | Music | Arrangement | Length |
|---|---|---|---|---|---|
| 1. | "Intro" | | Lim Soo-ho (PaperMaker); Woong Kim (PaperMaker); PaperMaker | Lim Soo-ho (PaperMaker); Woong Kim (PaperMaker); PaperMaker | 1:01 |
| 2. | "Bop Bop!" | Hwang Yu-bin; Mi Lee-mu (PaperMaker) | Lim Soo-ho (PaperMaker); Woong Kim (PaperMaker); Anna Timgren; PaperMaker | Lim Soo-ho (PaperMaker); Woong Kim (PaperMaker); PaperMaker | 3:39 |
| 3. | "Fiesta" | Danke (lalala Studio) | Ryan S. Jhun; Scott Russell Stoddart; Daniel Kim; Kuzzi | Ryan S. Jhun; Scott Russell Stoddart | 3:31 |
| 4. | "Tweet Tweet" | Hwang Yu-bin | Moonshine; Kim Yeon-seo; Ellen Berg | Moonshine | 3:11 |
| 5. | "Lemonade" | Lee Yi-jin (153/Joombas) | David Amber (153/Joombas); Andreas Öberg | David Amber (153/Joombas) | 3:43 |
| 6. | "Love You Like" | Lee Seu-ran; Umji | Ryan S. Jhun; Jeppe London Bilsby; Celine Svanbäck; Svea Kågemark | Ryan S. Jhun; Jeppe London Bilsby | 3:30 |
| 7. | "Mirror" (Korean: 거울아) | Yoske | EastWest; Yoske | EastWest | 3:24 |
| Total length: | | | | | 21:59 |

Notes

- "Bop Bop!" is stylized in all caps.

== Charts ==
=== Weekly charts ===
Weekly chart performance for Beam of Prism
| Chart (2022) | Peak position |
|---|---|
| Japanese Albums (Oricon) | 42 |
| South Korean Albums (Gaon) | 2 |

=== Monthly charts ===
Monthly chart performance for Beam of Prism
| Chart (2022) | Peak position |
|---|---|
| South Korean Albums (Gaon) | 8 |

== Release history ==
Release history for Beam of Prism
| Region | Date | Format | Label |
|---|---|---|---|
| Various | February 9, 2022 | Digital download; streaming | BPM; Kakao |
| South Korea | February 10, 2022 | CD | BPM; Kakao |
