= The Connect: Dejavu =

EP by Monsta X
- Released: March 26, 2018
- Recorded: 2018
- Genre: K-pop
- Length: 26:09
- Language: Korean
- Label: Starship; Kakao M

Monsta X chronology
The Code (2017)	The Connect: Dejavu (2018)	Piece (2018)

Singles from The Connect: Dejavu
- 1. "Jealousy" Released: March 26, 2018

The Connect: Dejavu is the sixth extended play by the South Korean boy group Monsta X. It was released by Starship Entertainment and distributed by Kakao M on March 26, 2018. It also consists of seven tracks, including the lead single "Jealousy".

== Background and release ==
In March, Monsta X released the scheduler through the official SNS channel, with the released image in a dreamy color, while having a background of Hyungwon holding a camera and staring at something, sensual typography and part of the seven logos are shown.

The EP was released with a total of four different versions (I / II / III / IV).

== Critical reception ==
"Jealousy" was praised for its fresh sound as "a poppy dance track swelling with obnoxious synths and their favorite low brasses", supposed as noted by Taylor Glasby of Dazed, it returned to more of Monsta X's earlier style of "heavy EDM and trap singles" than their last single "Dramarama".

=== Listicles ===
Name of critic or publication, name of listicle, name of work and rank
Critic/Publication	List	Work	Rank	Ref.
Song
Dazed	The 20 Best K-pop Songs of 2018	"Jealousy"	8	

== Commercial performance ==
As of 2022, the album has sold 195,762 copies in South Korea. The album charted at number 2 on the weekly Gaon Album Chart, and charted at number 28 overall in 2018.

"Jealousy" had one music show win on The Show on April 17.

== Track listing ==
The Connect: Dejavu track listing
No.	Title	Lyrics	Music	Arrangements	Length
1.	"Jealousy"	Seo Ji-eum; Jooheon; I.M	Harry Somerdahl; Shane Simmons; Hayden Bell	Harry Somerdahl; Shane Simmons; Hayden Bell; Stereo 14	3:27
2.	"Destroyer"	JQ (Makeumine Works); Dada (Makeumine Works); Jooheon; I.M	Daniel Kim; Caesar&Loui	Daniel Kim; Caesar&Loui	3:56
3.	"Fallin'" (폭우)	Seo Ji-eum; Jooheon; I.M	Caesar&Loui	Caesar&Loui; Stereo 14	3:51
4.	"Crazy In Love" (미쳤으니까)	Galactika; Jooheon; I.M	Galactika; Athena	Galactika; Athena	3:17
5.	"Lost In The Dream"	Jung Yoon; Le'mon; Lee Hee-joo; Jooheon; I.M	Hyuk Shin; Park Seul-gi; JJ Evans	Park Seul-gi	4:00
6.	"If Only"	Wonho; Jooheon; I.M; Rich Jang	Wonho; Rich Jang	Wonho; Rich Jang	4:03
7.	"Special"	Jooheon; Ye-Yo!; Nago; I.M	Jooheon; Ye-Yo!; Nago	Jooheon; Ye-Yo!; Nago	3:33
Total length:					26:09

== Charts ==
=== Album ===
==== Weekly charts ====
Chart performance for The Connect: Dejavu
Chart (2018)	Peak position
French Download Albums (SNEP)	90
Japan Hot Albums (Billboard Japan)	67
Japanese Albums (Oricon)	23
NZ Heatseeker Albums (RMNZ)	2
South Korean Albums (Gaon)	2
UK Download Albums (OCC)	73
US Heatseekers Albums (Billboard)	8
US Independent Albums (Billboard)	20
US World Albums (Billboard)	2

==== Monthly chart ====
Chart performance for The Connect: Dejavu
Chart (2018)	Peak position
South Korean Albums (Gaon)	5

==== Year-end chart ====
Chart performance for The Connect: Dejavu
Chart (2018)	Position
South Korean Albums (Gaon)	28

=== Song ===
==== Weekly charts ====
Chart performance for "Jealousy"
Chart (2018)	Peak position
Japan Hot 100 (Billboard Japan)	52
South Korea (Gaon) (Note: "Jealousy" did not enter on the Digital Chart but appeared on the component Download Chart.)	54
South Korea (K-pop Hot 100)	48
US World Digital Song Sales (Billboard)	4

== Certification and sales ==
Certification and sales for The Connect: Dejavu
Region	Certification	Certified units/Sales
South Korea	—	195,762
Japan	—	4,714
United States	—	2,000+

== Accolades ==
Music program award for "Jealousy"
Program	Date	Ref.
The Show	April 17, 2018	

== Awards and nominations ==
Name of the award ceremony, year presented, award category, nominated work and the result of the nomination
Award ceremony	Year	Category	Nominated work	Result	Ref.
Korea Popular Music Awards (Note: The Korea Popular Music Awards were jointly established in 2018 by the Korea Singers Association, the Korea Entertainment Producer's Association, the Recording Industry Association of Korea, the Federation of Korean Music Performers, and the Korea Music Copyright Association.)	2018	Best Digital Song	"Jealousy"	Nominated	
Korea Popular Music Awards	2018	Best Group Dance Track	"Jealousy"	Nominated	

== Release history ==
Release history and formats for The Connect: Dejavu
Region	Date	Format	Label
South Korea	March 26, 2018	CD; digital download; streaming	Starship Entertainment; Kakao M
Various	March 26, 2018	Digital download; streaming	Starship Entertainment; Kakao M

== See also ==
- List of K-pop songs on the Billboard charts
- List of K-pop albums on the Billboard charts
- List of K-pop songs on the World Digital Song Sales chart
