= Versus (Viviz EP) =

- Digital cover

EP by Viviz
- Released: November 2, 2023
- Genre: K-pop
- Length: 15:57
- Language: Korean
- Label: BPM; Swing; Kakao

Viviz chronology
Various (2023)	Versus (2023)	Voyage (2024)

Singles from Versus
- 1. "Maniac" Released: November 2, 2023

Versus is the fourth extended play (EP) by South Korean girl group Viviz. The EP was released by BPM Entertainment on November 2, 2023, and contains five tracks, including the lead single "Maniac".

== Background and release ==
On October 11, 2023, BPM Entertainment revealed that Viviz would be releasing their fourth EP, titled Versus, eight months after the release of Various. The tracklist was released on October 19, revealing that the lead single would be called "Maniac".

== Track listing ==
Track listing for Versus
No.	Title	Lyrics	Music	Arrangement	Length
1.	"Maniac"	Gu Yeo-reum	Jack Brady; Jordan Roman; Chloe Copoloff; Austin Nicole Wolfe; TMM	The Wavys	3:16
2.	"Untie"	Ellie Suh (153/Joombas)	Ryan Jeon; Lenno Linjama; Elsa Curran; Kella Armitage	Ryan Jeon; Lenno Linjama	3:10
3.	"Overflow"	C'SA; Bymore	C'SA; Xxio; Bymore	Xxio; Bymore	3:10
4.	"Day by Day (한 걸음)"	Jeong Ha-ri (153/Joombas); Bay (153/Joombas)	Andreas Öberg; Felix Back; Ashley Alisha; Freek Mulder	Back; Mulder	3:20
5.	"Up 2 Me"	Danke (Lalala studio)	Amanda Thomsen; Andreas Ringblom; Dr. Ahn	Dr. Ahn; Youngwoo	3:01
Total length:					15:57

== Charts ==
=== Weekly charts ===
Weekly chart performance for Various
Chart (2023)	Peak position
South Korean Albums (Circle)	9

=== Monthly charts ===
Monthly chart performance for Various
Chart (2023)	Peak position
South Korean Albums (Circle)	38

== Release history ==
Release history for Versus
Region	Date	Format	Label
South Korea	November 2, 2023	CD	BPM; Swing; Kakao
Various	November 2, 2023	Digital download; streaming	BPM; Swing; Kakao
