= Overstep (single album) =

- Digital cover

Single album by Badvillain
- Released: June 3, 2024
- Length: 6:45
- Language: Korean
- Label: BPM; Kakao

Singles from Overstep
- 1. "Badvillain" Released: June 3, 2024

Overstep is the debut single album by South Korean girl group Badvillain. It was released by BPM Entertainment on June 3, 2024, and contains three tracks, including the lead single "Badvillain".

== Background and release ==
On April 4, 2024, BPM Entertainment announced that it would be debuting a new girl group named Badvillain in first half of 2024. On May 21, it was announced that the group would be releasing their debut single album titled Overstep on June 3. The promotional schedule was released on the same day. Two days later, the track listing was released with "Badvillain" announced as the lead single. On May 31, the album preview teaser video was released. The music video teasers for "Badvillain" was released on June 1 and 2. The single album was released alongside the music video for "Badvillain" on June 3.

== Commercial performance ==
Overstep debuted at number 38 on South Korea's Circle Album Chart in the chart issue dated June 2–8, 2024.

== Track listing ==
Track listing for Overstep
No.	Title	Lyrics	Music	Arrangement	Length
1.	"Badvillain"	Villain36; Niallivdab; Bufobabas	Villain36; Niallivdab; EastWest; Junzo; Wuno; Livy	Niallivdab; EastWest; Junzo; Bufobabas	3:09
2.	"Badtitude" (야호)	Bufobabas	Bufobabas	Bufobabas	2:13
3.	"+82"	Bufobabas; Chloe Young; Ina	Bufobabas	Bufobabas	1:23
Total length:					6:45

== Charts ==
Chart performance for Overstep
Chart (2024)	Peak position
South Korean Albums (Circle)	38

== Sales ==
Overall sales for Overstep
Region	Sales
South Korea	5,367

== Release history ==
Release history for Overstep
Region	Date	Format	Label
South Korea	June 3, 2024	CD	BPM; Kakao
Various	June 3, 2024	Digital download; streaming	BPM; Kakao
