= List of Gaon Album Chart number ones of 2019 =

The Gaon Album Chart is a South Korean record chart that ranks the best-selling albums and EPs in South Korea. It is part of the Gaon Music Chart, which launched in February 2010. The data is compiled by the Ministry of Culture, Sports and Tourism and the Korea Music Content Industry Association based upon weekly/monthly physical album sales by major South Korean distributors such as Kakao M, Genie Music, Sony Music Korea, Warner Music Korea, Universal Music and Stone Music Entertainment.

== Weekly charts ==
Week ending date	Album	Artist	Ref.
January 5	1¹¹=1 (Power of Destiny)	Wanna One	
January 12	The New Kids	iKon	
January 19	All Light	Astro	
January 26	You Made My Dawn	Seventeen	
February 2	You Made My Dawn	Seventeen	
February 9	You Made My Dawn	Seventeen	
February 16	Want	Taemin	
February 23	Take.2 We Are Here	Monsta X	
March 2	My Moment	Ha Sung-woon	
March 9	The Dream Chapter: Star	TXT	
March 16	White Wind	Mamamoo	
March 23	Take.2 We Are Here	Monsta X	
March 30	Clé 1: Miroh	Stray Kids	
April 6	Heart*Iz	Iz One	
April 13	Map of the Soul: Persona	BTS	
April 20	Map of the Soul: Persona	BTS	
April 27	Map of the Soul: Persona	BTS	
May 4	Happily Ever After	NU'EST	
May 11	Happily Ever After	NU'EST	
May 18	We	Winner	
May 25	Spinning Top	Got7	
June 1	We Are Superhuman	NCT 127	
June 8	For the Summer	Cosmic Girls	
June 15	True Colors	U-Know	
June 22	The ReVe Festival: Day 1	Red Velvet	
June 29	BTS World: Original Soundtrack	BTS	
July 6	Fever Season	GFriend	
July 13	City Lights	Baekhyun	
July 20	The Book of Us: Gravity	Day6	
July 27	What a Life	Exo-SC	
August 3	Color on Me	Kang Daniel	
August 10	Color on Me	Kang Daniel	
August 17	We Boom	NCT Dream	
August 24	The ReVe Festival: Day 2	Red Velvet	
August 31	Emergency: Quantum Leap	X1	
September 7	Emergency: Quantum Leap	X1	
September 14	Emergency: Quantum Leap	X1	
September 21	An Ode	Seventeen	
September 28	Feel Special	Twice	
October 5	Dear My Dear	Chen	
October 12	Treasure EP.Fin: All to Action	Ateez	
October 19	Time_Slip	Super Junior	
October 26	The Dream Chapter: Magic	TXT	
November 2	Follow: Find You	Monsta X	
November 9	Call My Name	Got7	
November 16	Reality in Black	Mamamoo	
November 23	Love Poem	IU	
November 30	Obsession	Exo	
December 7	Obsession	Exo	
December 14	Clé: Levanter	Stray Kids	
December 21	Clé: Levanter	Stray Kids	
December 28	The ReVe Festival: Finale	Red Velvet	

== Monthly charts ==
Month	Album	Artist	Sales	Ref.
January	You Made My Dawn	Seventeen	404,783	
February	Take.2 We Are Here	Monsta X	174,371	
March	The Dream Chapter: Star	TXT	145,098	
April	Map of the Soul: Persona	BTS	3,229,032	
May	Spinning Top	Got7	252,826	
June	BTS World: Original Soundtrack	BTS	498,455	
July	City Lights	Baekhyun	508,321	
August	Emergency: Quantum Leap	X1	405,102	
September	An Ode	Seventeen	796,134	
October	Time_Slip	Super Junior	365,751	
November	Obsession	Exo	563,805	
December	Obsession	Exo	202,489	
