= Various (EP) =

- Digital cover

EP by Viviz
- Released: January 31, 2023
- Genre: K-pop
- Length: 19:57
- Language: Korean
- Label: BPM; Swing; Kakao

Viviz chronology
Summer Vibe (2022)	Various (2023)	Versus (2023)

Singles from Various
- 1. "Pull Up" Released: January 31, 2023

Various is the third extended play by South Korean girl group Viviz. The EP was released by BPM Entertainment on January 31, 2023, and contains six tracks, including the lead single "Pull Up".

== Background and release ==
On January 9, 2023, BPM Entertainment announced Viviz would be releasing their third extended play titled Various on January 31. A day later, the promotional schedule was released. On January 13, the track listing was released with "Pull Up" announced as the lead single. On January 27, the album's track preview video was released. The music videos teaser for "Pull Up" was released on January 29 and 30. The EP was released alongside the music video for "Pull Up" on January 31.

== Track listing ==
Track listing for Various
No.	Title	Lyrics	Music	Arrangement	Length
1.	"Pull Up"	Lee Da-ol (153/Joombas); Ellie Suh (153/Joombas)	Dave Villa; Maddy Simmen	Dave Villa	2:55
2.	"Blue Clue"	C'SA	C'SA; De View; Wonder.B	De View; Wonder.B	3:16
3.	"Love or Die"	Ellie Suh (153/Joombas); Liljune (153/Joombas)	Charli Taft; Daniel "Obi" Klein; Andreas Öberg	Daniel "Obi" Klein	3:39
4.	"Vanilla Sugar Killer"	Moon Seol-ri	Shin Kyung; Eva Louhivuori; Niko Salmela	Shin Kyung	3:17
5.	"Overdrive"	Moon Seol-ri	Flum3n; Maria Marcus; Will!	Flum3n; Will!	3:31
6.	"So Special"	Jiwon (153/Joombas)	Frederik Carstens; Celine Svanbäck	Frederik Carstens	3:19
Total length:					19:57

== Charts ==
=== Weekly charts ===
Weekly chart performance for Various
Chart (2023)	Peak position
Japanese Albums (Oricon)	40
South Korean Albums (Circle)	4

=== Monthly charts ===
Monthly chart performance for Various
Chart (2023)	Peak position
South Korean Albums (Circle)	29

== Release history ==
Release history for Various
Region	Date	Format	Label
South Korea	January 31, 2023	CD	BPM; Swing; Kakao
Various	January 31, 2023	Digital download; streaming	BPM; Swing; Kakao
