= Voyage (Viviz EP) =

- Digital cover

EP by Viviz
- Released: November 7, 2024
- Genre: K-pop
- Length: 15:22
- Language: Korean
- Labels: BPM; Swing; Kakao

Viviz chronology
Versus (2023)	Voyage (2024)	A Montage of ( ) (2025)

Singles from Voyage
- 1. "Shhh!" Released: November 7, 2024

Voyage is the fifth extended play by South Korean girl group Viviz. The EP was released by BPM Entertainment on November 7, 2024, and contains five tracks, including the lead single "Shhh!".

== Background and release ==
In June 2024, Viviz embarked on their first world tour titled V.hind: Love and Tears. Throughout the tour, the group worked on new music, with SinB sharing that they planned to release new music before the end of 2024. Following the completion of the tour, on 14 October 2024, the group's label BPM Entertainment revealed that they would be releasing a new EP titled Voyage, approximately one year after their last release, Versus (2023).

The tracklist for the album was released on 28 October, revealing that the album would include five songs, with two tracks written by Viviz member Umji, one of which also featuring songwriting from Kiss of Life's Belle.

== Track listing ==
Track listing for Voyage
No.	Title	Lyrics	Music	Arrangement	Length
1.	"Shhh!"	Ha Yoon-ah (153/Joombas); Hwang Yu-bin (XYXX); PPPlayers (Eldorado); Ransle	Aniela Eklund; Oliver Forsmark	Forsmark	3:14
2.	"Cliché"	Seo Ga-eul; Rizin (153/Joombas); Kael Byeol (153/Joombas); Maria Marcus; Christian Fast; Tobias Näslund	Marcus; Fast; Näslund		3:36
3.	"Full Moon"	Kim A-ri; Myeong Ji-eun; Oh Yu-won; A13R; Clef Crew (Clef/A13R); C'SA	C'SA; Alawn	Alawn	2:13
4.	"Hypnotize"	Umji	Belle; Jword; Paprikaa; Steven	Paprikaa; Steven	3:05
5.	"Love & Tears"	Umji	Umji; Seo Won-jin	Seo Won-jin	3:14
Total length:					15:22

== Charts ==
=== Weekly charts ===
Weekly chart performance for Voyage
Chart (2024)	Peak position
South Korean Albums (Circle)	14

=== Monthly charts ===
Monthly chart performance for Voyage
Chart (2024)	Position
South Korean Albums (Circle)	43

== Release history ==
Release history for Voyage
Region	Date	Format	Label
South Korea	November 7, 2024	CD	BPM; Swing; Kakao
Various	November 7, 2024	Digital download; streaming	BPM; Swing; Kakao
