= Phenomenon (Monsta X album) =

Studio album by Monsta X
- Released: August 21, 2019
- Genre: J-pop
- Length: 30:42
- Language: Japanese
- Label: Universal Music Japan

Monsta X chronology
Take.2 We Are Here (2019)	Phenomenon (2019)	Follow: Find You (2019)

Singles from Phenomenon
- 1. "Livin' It Up" Released: September 12, 2018; 2. "Shoot Out (Japanese version)" Released: March 27, 2019; 3. "Alligator (Japanese version)" Released: June 12, 2019; 4. "X-Phenomenon" Released: July 15, 2019

Phenomenon is the second Japanese-language studio album of the South Korean boy group Monsta X. It was released and distributed by Universal Music Japan on August 21, 2019. It is also the last Japanese album to feature Wonho, who left the group in October 2019.

== Background and release ==
The album was announced on June 18, 2019 as a surprise announcement, following a live performance. The album contains nine main tracks, with special tracks varying by versions. The album included two previously released Japanese versions of the Korean title tracks "Alligator" and "Shoot Out".

The title track "X-Phenomenon" was pre-released on July 15, 2019 ahead of the album's full release. A music video was simultaneously released for the song.

Like their previous Japanese album, the album was released in three versions for the physical release; the regular version, and limited editions A and B. The regular version has the special track "Thriller", and limited editions A and B have the special tracks "Champagne" and "Polaroid", respectively.

In August and September 2019, following the release of the album, Monsta X held a Japanese tour.

== Critical reception ==
Chris Gillett of SCMP wrote that Phenomenon, with the exception of the Japanese versions of "Alligator" and "Shoot Out", presented "a different sound from their previous album Take.2 We Are Here", with "a less of the EDM focused style" and "a more aggressive tone".

== Commercial performance ==
"Livin' It Up" and the Japanese versions of "Alligator" and "Shoot Out" were all certified gold singles by RIAJ.

The album sold more than 56,000 copies in Japan, and debuted at number two on both Oricon Albums Chart and Billboard Japan Hot Albums chart.

== Track listing ==
Phenomenon track listing
No.	Title	Lyrics	Music	Length
1.	"X-Phenomenon"	ZERO	Sean Michael Alexander; Phil Schwan; Drew Ryan Scott	2:57
2.	"Livin' It Up"	ZERO	Albin Nordqvist; Tommy Clint	3:45
3.	"My Beast"	ZERO	Scott Russell Stoddart; Mark Angelico Thomson; Warren David Meyers	3:16
4.	"Alligator" (Japanese version)	Seo Ji Eum; Joohoney; I.M	Kevin Charge; Andres Oberg; Drew Ryan Scott; Stereo14; Daniel Kim	3:13
5.	"Shoot Out" (Japanese version)	Seo Ji Eum; Joohoney; I.M	TI; Stereo14; Daniel Kim	3:28
6.	"Black Swan"	ZERO	Tommy Clint; Atsushi Shimada	3:26
7.	"Flash Back"	ZERO	Albin Nordqvist; Yoshi Breen; Peter St. James	3:27
8.	"Swish"	ZERO; Galactika	Johan Becker; Andres Oberg; Robin Padam; Jonatan Gusmark	3:31
9.	"Carry On"	ZERO	Albin Nordqvist; Tommy Clint	3:39
Total length:				30:42

Physical release exclusives
No.	Title	Length
10.	"Champagne" (limited edition A)	3:29
11.	"Polaroid" (limited edition B)	3:30
12.	"Thriller" (regular edition)	3:39

== Charts ==
=== Album ===
==== Weekly charts ====
Chart performance for Phenomenon
Chart (2019)	Peak position
Japan Hot Albums (Billboard Japan)	2
Japanese Albums (Oricon)	2

=== Songs ===
==== Weekly charts ====
Chart performance for "Livin' It Up"
Chart (2018)	Peak position
Japan Hot 100 (Billboard Japan)	3
Japanese Singles (Oricon)	3

Chart performance for "Shoot Out" (Japanese version)
Chart (2019)	Peak position
Japan Hot 100 (Billboard Japan)	2
Japanese Singles (Oricon)	2

Chart performance for "Alligator" (Japanese version)
Chart (2019)	Peak position
Japan Hot 100 (Billboard Japan)	2
Japanese Singles (Oricon)	2

== Certification and sales ==
Region	Work	Certification	Certified units/Sales
Album
Japan	Phenomenon	—	56,244
Songs
Japan (RIAJ)	"Livin' It Up"	Gold	126,895 (Phy.)
Japan (RIAJ)	"Shoot Out" (Japanese version)	Gold	158,089 (Phy.)
Japan (RIAJ)	"Alligator" (Japanese version)	Gold	170,292 (Phy.)
