= Cha Ga-won =

South Korean businessperson (born 1982)

- Born: May 20, 1982 (age 44); Seoul, South Korea
- Citizenship: South Korean
- Occupation: Businessperson
- Known for: One Hundred Label
- Title: Chief executive officer

Cha Ga-won (Korean: 차가원) is a South Korean businessperson. She is the chief executive officer of One Hundred Label, an entertainment company she co-founded in 2023, and has been associated with the real-estate group p_Arc Group.

== Early involvement in entertainment ==
Cha was mainly working in real estate business. Since she started her career in entertainment industry, it was at the beginning of 2023. According to media, she provided huge amount of money to set up One Hundred Label and a luxurious real estate in Hannam-dong, Seoul and was used as collateral to acquire funds for the business.

She partnered with MC Mong (rapper, producer), with business connections, and Double Sidekick (producer Park Jang-geun) that came to work with her. The established time was sometime in mid-2023.

== Expansion of One Hundred Label ==
Under Cha’s leadership the company had expanded through a number of takeovers. This includes Big Planet Made Entertainment and Million Market in 2023, both of which have associations with MC Mong, as well as INB100 in 2024, a subsidiary that manages EXO Beekhyun and managing The Boyz after the group left IST Entertainment.

Many artists who have been part of One Hundred label under any circumstance have been Lee Seung-gi, Taemin, all members of EXO-CBX, and The Boyz. It also functions as a multi-label company instead of one single company.

In 2025, MC Mong resign as management responsibility, leaving Cha in sole control of the company. This eventually resulted in a conflict between the two partners, and Cha pursued a civil action against MC Mong for recovery of his loans amounting to roughly 12 billion won (approximately US$9.85 million).

== Financial and legal issues ==
Following the end of 2025, Cha and her company One Hundred Label were hit with several claims of financial misconduct, with police investigations having focused on suspicions that Cha had sought large sums of advance payment for business partnerships for entrainment and intellectual-property ventures that she did not follow through with. The total amounts documented by law officials ranged around 30 billion won. Cha has denied the allegations and has attributed several to efforts by individuals seeking to contest her leadership of the firm.

Seoul police filed for detention warrants more than once during 2026. Cha was arrested in connection with the investigation into the fraud in August 2026.

During at the same time, the label was hit by allegations of late staff pay and contractual disputes with its artists around commission payouts. A number of the label group’s artists sought to dissolve contracts or walk away altogether. The label eventually engaged in merger or acquisition discussions with marketing technology company, Orbit, in an effort to stabilize its business.
