= Take.2 We Are Here =

Studio album by Monsta X
- Released: February 18, 2019
- Genre: K-pop
- Length: 31:40
- Language: Korean
- Label: Starship; Kakao M

Monsta X chronology
Take.1 Are You There? (2018)	Take.2 We Are Here (2019)	Phenomenon (2019)

Singles from Take.2 We Are Here
- 1. "Alligator" Released: February 18, 2019

Take.2 We Are Here is the second part of the second Korean-language studio album by the South Korean boy group Monsta X. It was released by Starship Entertainment and distributed by Kakao M on February 18, 2019. It consists of ten songs, including title track "Alligator".

== Background and release ==
The album was described as the concept of "finding hope between loss and wondering". It is also fronted by the fierce dance track "Alligator", which uses the reptilian metaphor to dramatically depict the intentions of someone aiming for the attention of a romantic interest. "Alligator" was also connected to their previous lead single "Shoot Out" from their album Take.1 Are You There? with the seven deadly sins of Christian theology concept.

The physical album was released in four versions.

== Critical reception ==
Professional ratings
Review scores
Source	Rating
The 405	6/10 stars
NME	3/5 stars

Even before the announcement of the album title, it was already one of "The 10 Most Anticipated K-pop Albums of 2019" by the American music and entertainment magazine Billboard.

Reviewing the album for NME, Rhian Daly wrote that Take.2 We Are Here, like its title, sounds assured. For it, the seven-piece group rediscover their niche as "masters of the throbbing dancefloor cut, sounding far more cohesive in the process".

=== Listicles ===
Name of critic or publication, name of listicle, name of work, and rank
Critic/Publication	List	Work	Rank	Ref.
Album
Billboard	The 10 Most Anticipated K-pop Albums of 2019	Take.2 We Are Here	6	

== Commercial performance ==
The album debuted at number one on both weekly and monthly Gaon Album Chart and sold 174,371 copies in its first month of release (which only counted the first eleven days of sales after the album's release) in South Korea. It peaked again at number one on the weekly chart a month after its release.

"Alligator" peaked at number one, number twenty-seven, and number seventy-six on the Gaon Social Chart, Gaon Download Chart, and Gaon BGM Chart, respectively, as well as peaking at number 133 on the Gaon Digital Chart. The other songs on the album, while they did not appear on the main chart, entered the component Gaon Download Chart, with "Ghost" debuting at 186, "Play It Cool" at 168, "No Reason" at 165, "Turbulence" at 198, "Rodeo" at 199, and "Party Time" at 196. It had four music program wins on The Show, Show Champion, M Countdown, and Music Bank.

== Track listing ==
Take.2 We Are Here track listing
No.	Title	Lyrics	Music	Arrangement	Length
1.	"Intro: We Are Here"		Stereo14	Stereo14	1:12
2.	"Alligator"	Seo Ji-eum; Joohoney; I.M	Kevin Charge; Andreas Öberg; Drew Ryan Scott; Stereo14; Daniel Kim	Kevin Charge; Stereo14	3:12
3.	"악몽" (Ghost)	Lee Seu-ran; Joohoney; I.M	Daniel Kim; Cage	Cage	3:28
4.	"Play It Cool" (with Steve Aoki)	Seo Ji-eum; I.M	Steve Aoki; Corey Sanders; Coffee Clarence Jr.; Sylvester Willy Silverstein; David Morup	Steve Aoki	3:06
5.	"No Reason"	Wonho; Brother Su; Joohoney; I.M	Wonho; Brother Su; An Seong-hyeon; Shin Ki-hyun	Wonho; An Seong-hyeon; Shin Ki-hyun	3:24
6.	"Give Me Dat"	Jeong-yoon (153/Joombas); Joohoney; I.M	JJ Evans (153/Joombas); Jeff Lewis; Sebastian Berglund	Sebastian Berglund	3:25
7.	"난기류" (Turbulence)	JQ (Makeumine Works); Shin Sae-rom; Sol-hee (Makeumine Works); Joohoney; I.M	Daniel Kim; Stereo14; Ti	Stereo14; Ti	3:21
8.	"Rodeo"	JQ (Makeumine Works); Mola; TOMBOY; Kam Eun-yu (Makeumine Works); Joohoney; I.M	Hanif Hitmanic Sabzevari; Christian Dropfill Berglund; Andy Love; Daniel Kim	Hanif Hitmanic Sabzevari; Christian Dropfill Berglund	3:43
9.	"Stealer"	Seo Ji-eum; Lee Seu-ran; Joohoney; I.M	Hanif Hitmanic Sabzevari; Dennis Deko Kordnejad; Daniel Kim; Stereo14; Brother Su; Ryan S. Jhun	Hanif Hitmanic Sabzevari; Dennis Deko Kordnejad; Daniel Kim; Stereo14; Ryan S. Jhun	3:28
10.	"Party Time"	Brother Su; Joohoney; I.M	Caesar & Loui; Brother Su	Caesar & Loui	3:10
Total length:					31:40

== Charts ==
=== Album ===
==== Weekly charts ====
Chart (2019)	Peak position
French Digital Albums (SNEP)	84
Japan Hot Albums (Billboard Japan)	49
Japanese Albums (Oricon)	9
South Korean Albums (Gaon)	1
US Heatseekers Albums (Billboard)	12
US World Albums (Billboard)	4

==== Monthly chart ====
Chart (2019)	Peak position
South Korean Albums (Gaon)	1

==== Year-end chart ====
Chart (2019)	Position
South Korean Albums (Gaon)	22

=== Song ===
==== Weekly charts ====
Chart performance for "Alligator"
Chart (2019)	Peak position
Japan Hot 100 (Billboard Japan)	41
South Korea (Gaon)	133
South Korea (K-pop Hot 100)	21
US World Digital Song Sales (Billboard)	5

== Certification and sales ==
Certification and sales for Take.2 We Are Here
Region	Certification	Certified units/Sales
South Korea (KMCA)	Platinum	254,794
Japan	—	10,907

== Accolades ==
Music program awards for "Alligator"
Program	Date (4 total)	Ref.
M Countdown	February 28, 2019	
Music Bank	March 1, 2019	
Show Champion	February 27, 2019	
The Show	February 26, 2019	

== Awards and nominations ==
Name of the award ceremony, year presented, award category, nominated work and the result of the nomination
Award ceremony	Year	Category	Nominated work	Result	Ref.
Gaon Chart Music Awards	2020	Album of the Year – 1st Quarter	Take.2 We Are Here	Nominated	
Golden Disc Awards	2020	Disc Daesang	Take.2 We Are Here	Nominated	
Golden Disc Awards	2020	Disc Bonsang	Take.2 We Are Here	Won	
Mnet Asian Music Awards	2019	Song of the Year	"Alligator"	Nominated	
Mnet Asian Music Awards	2019	Best Dance Performance – Male Group	"Alligator"	Nominated	

== Release history ==
Release history and formats for Take.2 We Are Here
Region	Date	Format	Label
South Korea	February 18, 2019	CD; digital download; streaming	Starship Entertainment; Kakao M
Various	February 18, 2019	Digital download; streaming	Starship Entertainment; Kakao M

== See also ==
- List of certified albums in South Korea
- List of Gaon Album Chart number ones of 2019
- List of K-pop albums on the Billboard charts
- List of K-pop songs on the Billboard charts
- List of K-pop songs on the World Digital Song Sales chart
