= Piece (Monsta X album) =

Studio album by Monsta X
- Released: April 25, 2018
- Genre: J-pop
- Length: 34:33
- Language: Japanese
- Label: Universal Music Japan

Monsta X chronology
The Connect: Dejavu (2018)	Piece (2018)	Take.1 Are You There? (2018)

Singles from Piece
- 1. "Hero (Japanese version)" Released: April 26, 2017; 2. "Beautiful (Japanese version)" Released: August 2, 2017; 3. "Spotlight" Released: January 31, 2018; 4. "Puzzle" Released: April 10, 2018

Piece is the first Japanese-language album and second studio album of the South Korean boy group Monsta X. It was released and distributed by Universal Music Japan on April 25, 2018.

== Background and release ==
The album was announced in February 2018, as Monsta X's first Japanese album. The album consists of ten tracks, including four new tracks, while the other six were already released singles or Japanese versions of some of the group's earlier Korean tracks. Just prior to the release of this album, in March 2018, "Spotlight", originally released in January that year, became a certified gold single by RIAJ, the first of the group's Japanese singles to achieve this certification.

On April 10, a music video for the track "Puzzle" was released in advance of the album, with a short version of the music video posted to YouTube.

The album was released in three versions, the regular version and limited editions A and B.

Following the release of the album, Monsta X held their first Japanese tour, through April and May 2018.

== Commercial performance ==
The album sold more than 55,000 copies in Japan. The album had three tracks which charted in Japan, although the track "Puzzle" did not; these are the Japanese versions of "Hero" and "Beautiful", as well as "Spotlight".

== Track listing ==
Piece track listing
No.	Title	Lyrics	Music	Length
1.	"Killin' Me"	ZERO	Steven Lee; MUSOH; Christofer Erixon	3:22
2.	"Shine Forever" (Japanese version)	ZERO	Lish; Stereo14; Bintage	3:28
3.	"Stuck" (Japanese version)	ZERO	Punch Sound	3:45
4.	"Ready or Not" (Japanese version)	ZERO	Lish; Stereo14; Esbee	3:16
5.	"Hero" (Japanese version)	ZERO	Punch Sound	3:39
6.	"Spotlight"	ZERO	Albin Nordqvist; Adrian Mckinnon; Gashima	3:56
7.	"Aura"	Jooheon; Lee Jin-ho; Ok Jae Won	Jooheon; Lee Jin-ho; Ok Jae Won	3:11
8.	"Beautiful" (Japanese version)	ZERO; Galactika		3:23
9.	"PUZZLE"	ZERO	Drew Ryan Scott; Joacim Persson; Johan Alkenas	3:13
10.	"#GYFL"	ZERO	Simon Janiov; Andreas Öberg	3:21
Total length:				34:33

== Charts ==
=== Album ===
==== Weekly charts ====
Chart performance for Piece
Chart (2018)	Peak position
Japan Hot Albums (Billboard Japan)	7
Japanese Albums (Oricon)	3

=== Songs ===
==== Weekly charts ====
Chart performance for "Hero" (Japanese version)
Chart (2017)	Peak position
Japan Hot 100 (Billboard Japan)	3
Japanese Singles (Oricon)	2

Chart performance for "Beautiful" (Japanese version)
Chart (2017)	Peak position
Japan Hot 100 (Billboard Japan)	4
Japanese Singles (Oricon)	2

Chart performance for "Spotlight"
Chart (2018)	Peak position
Japan Hot 100 (Billboard Japan)	2
Japanese Singles (Oricon)	2

== Certification and sales ==
Region	Work	Certification	Certified units/Sales
Album
Japan	Piece	—	55,042
Songs
Japan (RIAJ)	"Hero" (Japanese version)	—	69,713 (Phy.)
Japan (RIAJ)	"Beautiful" (Japanese version)	—	68,218 (Phy.)
Japan (RIAJ)	"Spotlight"	Gold	94,651 (Phy.)
