= Take.1 Are You There? =

Studio album by Monsta X
- Released: October 22, 2018
- Recorded: 2017–2018
- Genre: K-pop
- Length: 34:25
- Language: Korean
- Label: Starship; Kakao M

Monsta X chronology
Piece (2018)	Take.1 Are You There? (2018)	Take.2 We Are Here (2019)

Singles from Take.1 Are You There?
- 1. "Shoot Out" Released: October 22, 2018

Take.1 Are You There? is the first part of the second Korean-language studio album by the South Korean boy group Monsta X. It was released by Starship Entertainment and distributed by Kakao M on October 22, 2018. It consists of ten songs, including the lead single "Shoot Out".

== Background and release ==
It was released as part one of two of the group's second Korean-language album, with Take.2 We Are Here being the second half of the album. Group members Jooheon and I.M contributed to the song writing and production for much of the album, with members Wonho, Kihyun, and Minhyuk contributing for the song "I Do Love U", alongside them.

"Shoot Out" is a song that represents the worldview for this album, "Light and Dark", "Good and Evil", "Life and Death", and everything on the border. It can be seen as an extended version of the Monsta X worldview that transcends time and space. It also expresses each of the seven deadly sins and shows them wandering in search of salvation.

The physical album was released in four versions.

== Critical reception ==
Professional ratings
Review scores
Source	Rating
The 405	7/10 stars

"Shoot Out" gained praised for its distinct style, particularly Jooheon's and I.M's unique raps.

The album was praised for its "vicious, energetic, hard-hitting sound" adding "a new sophistication to the menacing side of their discography". Aside from the lead single, Caitlin Kelley of Billboard picked the song "Myself" as the standout track, being on the "softer side of the spectrum".

=== Listicles ===
Name of critic or publication, name of listicle, name of work, and rank
Critic/Publication	List	Work	Rank	Ref.
Album
Billboard	The 20 Best K-pop Albums of 2018	Take.1 Are You There?	13	
Real Sound	Top 10 K-pop Albums of 2018	Take.1 Are You There?	Placed (Note: All the albums and songs listed are either unranked or just alphabetically ranked.)	
Refinery29	The 12 Best K-pop Albums of 2018	Take.1 Are You There?	6	
Rolling Stone India	10 Best K-pop Albums of 2018	Take.1 Are You There?	10	
Song
Philippine Daily Inquirer	Most covered K-pop Songs of 2018	"Shoot Out"	4	
SBS PopAsia	Top 100 Asian Pop Songs of 2018	"Shoot Out"	32	
SBS PopAsia	25 Best K-pop Dances of 2018	"Shoot Out"	9	

== Commercial performance ==
In September 2021, it became Monsta X's fifth album to be certified platinum by Gaon. The album also charted at number one, two, and nineteen on the weekly, monthly, and yearly Gaon Album Chart, respectively.

"Shoot Out" charted on Billboard's World Digital Song Sales chart upon release, while "I Do Love U" and "Myself" charted in 2020 and 2021, respectively. It had four music show wins, such as The Show, Show Champion, M Countdown, and Music Bank.

== Track listing ==
Take.1 Are You There? track listing
No.	Title	Lyrics	Music	Arrangement	Length
1.	"Intro: Are You There?"		Stereo14	Stereo14	1:01
2.	"Underwater"	Brother Su; Jooheon; I.M	Caesar & Loui; Brother Su	Caesar & Loui	3:46
3.	"Shoot Out"	Seo Ji-eum; Jooheon; I.M	Daniel Kim; Stereo14; Ti	Stereo14; Ti	3:27
4.	"Heart Attack"	Wonho; Jooheon; I.M	A-Dee; Drew Ryan Scott	A-Dee	3:19
5.	"널하다" (I Do Love U)	Wonho; Kihyun; Minhyuk; Jooheon; I.M	Wonho; An Seong-hyeon; Shin Ki-hyun	Wonho; An Seong-hyeon; Shin Ki-hyun	3:46
6.	"어디서 뭐해" (Mohae)	I.M; Yoonseok; Wooki; Jooheon	I.M; Yoonseok; Wooki	I.M; Yoonseok; Wooki	3:30
7.	"Oh My!"	Lee Seu-ran; Jooheon; I.M	Maria Marcus; Albin Nordqvist; Brad.K	Albin Nordqvist	3:43
8.	"Myself"	Zaya (153/Joombas); Jooheon; I.M	Hyuk Shin (153/Joombas); Jeff Lewis	Hyuk Shin (153/Joombas); MRey (153/Joombas)	4:12
9.	"By My Side"	Jooheon; 9F; I.M	Jooheon; 9F	Jooheon; 9F	3:43
10.	"Spotlight" (Korean version)	Wonho; Jooheon; I.M	Albin Nordqvist; Adrian McKinnon; GASHIMA	Albin Nordqvist	3:56
Total length:					34:25

== Charts ==
=== Album ===
==== Weekly charts ====
Chart (2018)	Peak position
French Digital Albums (SNEP)	92
Japan Hot Albums (Billboard Japan)	41
Japanese Albums (Oricon)	7
South Korean Albums (Gaon)	1
US Heatseekers Albums (Billboard)	6
US Independent Albums (Billboard)	24
US World Albums (Billboard)	7

==== Monthly chart ====
Chart (2018)	Peak position
South Korean Albums (Gaon)	2

==== Year-end chart ====
Chart (2018)	Position
South Korean Albums (Gaon)	19

=== Songs ===
==== Weekly charts ====
Chart performance for "Shoot Out"
Chart (2018)	Peak position
South Korea (K-pop Hot 100)	23
US World Digital Song Sales (Billboard)	6

Chart performance for "I Do Love U"
Chart (2020)	Peak position
US World Digital Song Sales (Billboard)	5

Chart performance for "Myself"
Chart (2021)	Peak position
US World Digital Song Sales (Billboard)	18

== Certification and sales ==
Certification and sales for Take.1 Are You There?
Region	Certification	Certified units/Sales
South Korea (KMCA)	Platinum	250,000+ (Note: To be certified platinum, the album had to sell at least 250,000 units in South Korea.)
Japan	—	10,592

== Accolades ==
Music program awards for "Shoot Out"
Program	Date (4 total)	Ref.
M Countdown	November 1, 2018	
Music Bank	November 2, 2018	
Show Champion	October 31, 2018	
The Show	October 30, 2018	

== Awards and nominations ==
Name of the award ceremony, year presented, award category, nominated work and the result of the nomination
Award ceremony	Year	Category	Nominated work	Result	Ref.
Golden Disc Awards	2019	Disc Daesang	Take.1 Are You There?	Nominated	
Golden Disc Awards	2019	Disc Bonsang	Take.1 Are You There?	Won	
Mnet Asian Music Awards	2018	Song of the Year	"Shoot Out"	Nominated	
Mnet Asian Music Awards	2018	Best Dance Performance – Male Group	"Shoot Out"	Nominated	

== Release history ==
Release history and formats for Take.1 Are You There?
Region	Date	Format	Label
South Korea	October 22, 2018	CD; digital download; streaming	Starship Entertainment; Kakao M
Various	October 22, 2018	Digital download; streaming	Starship Entertainment; Kakao M

== See also ==
- List of certified albums in South Korea
- List of Gaon Album Chart number ones of 2018
- List of K-pop albums on the Billboard charts
- List of K-pop songs on the Billboard charts
- List of K-pop songs on the World Digital Song Sales chart
