= Viviz =

South Korean girl group

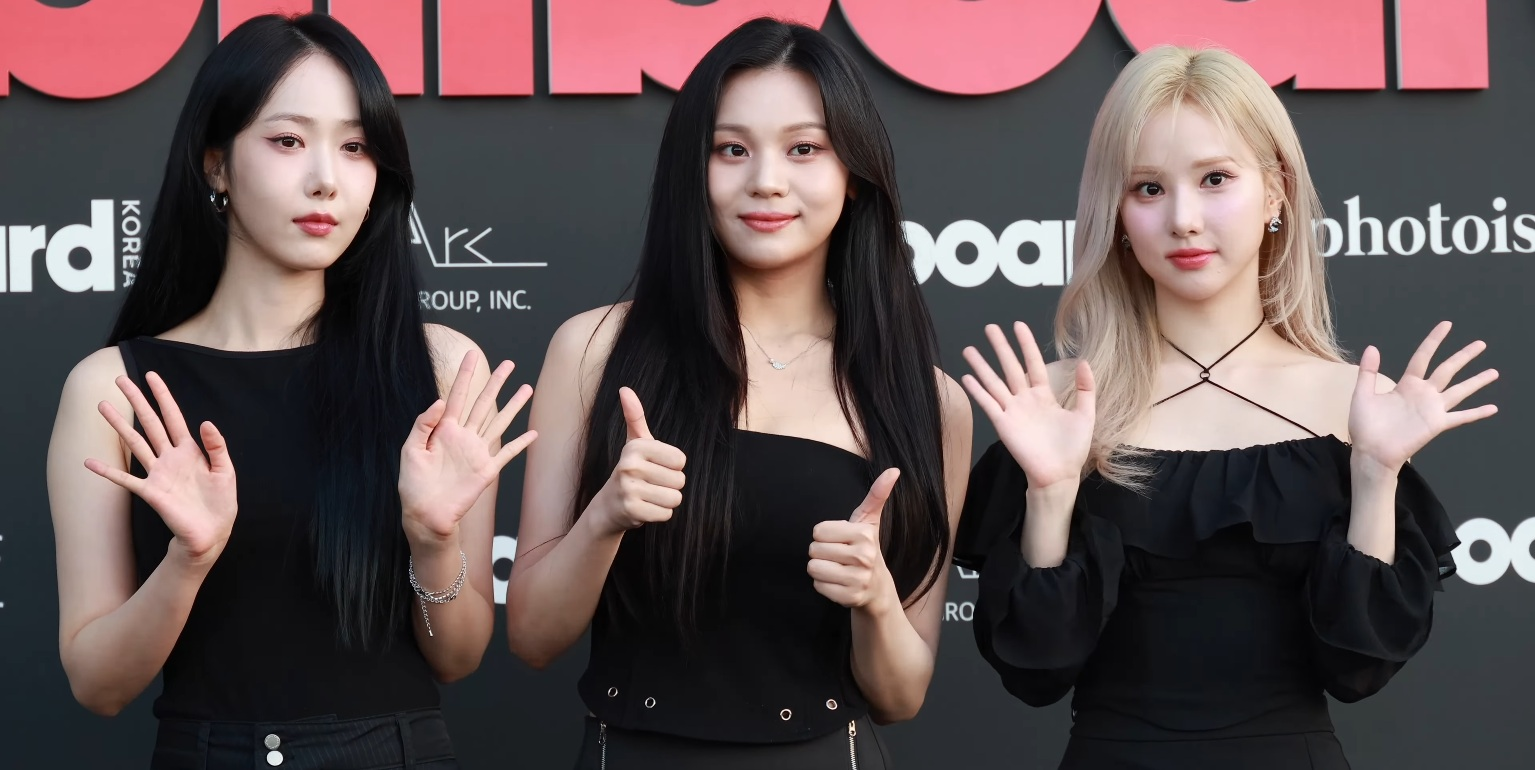
- Viviz in August 2024; L–R: SinB, Umji, and Eunha

Background information
- Origin: Seoul, South Korea
- Genre: K-pop
- Years active: 2021–present
- Labels: BPM; Uncore
- Members: Eunha; SinB; Umji
- Website: Official website

Viviz (Korean: 비비지; RR: Bibiji; stylized in all caps) is a South Korean girl group formed by BPM Entertainment. The group consists of GFriend members Eunha, SinB, and Umji. The group debuted on February 9, 2022, with their first extended play (EP), Beam of Prism. In March 2026, the group terminated their contract with BPM Entertainment amid payment disputes.

== Name ==
The group's name, Viviz, is an abbreviation of the phrase "Vivid dayZ", which brings together the concepts of "clear, intense, and days", defined by the agency as "the meaning of becoming artists who always proudly express their own colors to the world". In addition, its Korean pronunciation is "bi-bi-ji", refers to the names of the three members: Eunha (Jung Eun-bi), SinB (Hwang Eun-bi) and Umji.

== Career ==
=== 2021–2022: Introduction and debut with Beam of Prism, Queendom 2 and Summer Vibe ===
Official logo

On October 6, 2021, it was announced that Eunha, SinB, and Umji, who were former members of GFriend, had signed with BPM Entertainment and would be redebuting as a three-member group. On October 8, the group name was announced as Viviz.

On January 24, 2022, BPM Entertainment announced the group would be making their debut on February 9, 2022, with the release of their first EP, Beam of Prism. Following the EP's release, they made their broadcast debut on Mnet's M Countdown on February 10. On February 16, exactly a week after their debut, the group won their first music show award on MBC M's Show Champion.

On February 21, Mnet announced that Viviz would be participating in the second season of the Mnet reality competition show Queendom, finishing in third place in the finals. On April 26, Viviz appeared on Grammy's Global Spin — a video series by The Recording Academy highlighting unique artists from around the globe performing their debut single, "Bop Bop!", at the Dongdaemun Design Plaza in Seoul. The trio were the first ever K-pop girl group to feature on the series.

On June 23, BPM Entertainment announced that Viviz would be releasing their second EP, Summer Vibe, on July 6. On October 21, Universe announced that Viviz would be releasing the single "Rum Pum Pum" on October 27 for its "Universe Music" series.

=== 2023–2024: Various, Versus, first world tour, and Voyage ===
On January 5, 2023, BPM Entertainment announced that Viviz would be releasing their third EP, titled Various, on January 31. On October 11, it was announced that Viviz would be making a comeback on November 2 with their fourth EP, Versus. The EP's lead single "Maniac" became the group's most successful single to date, reaching number 14 on South Korea's Circle Chart and launching a viral dance challenge.

In June 2024, Viviz embarked on their first world tour, V.hind: Love and Tears, which lasted until September that year and comprised 28 shows in seven countries. In August 2024, all three members re-signed contracts with BPM Entertainment. On October 14, BPM Entertainment announced that Viviz's fifth EP Voyage would be released on November 7.

=== 2025–present: A Montage of ( ) and departure from BPM Entertainment ===
On June 16, 2025, BPM Entertainment announced that Viviz would release their first studio album, A Montage of ( ), on July 8. On March 4, 2026, the group terminated their contract with BPM Entertainment amid payment disputes, two months after preparations for their sixth EP were halted and several concerts and performances were canceled. In October, Viviz signed with a new agency, Uncore, which stated that a change to the group's name was being considered to facilitate the resumption of the members' activities.

== Members ==
- Eunha (은하)
- SinB (신비)
- Umji (엄지)

== Discography ==
=== Studio albums ===
List of studio albums, showing selected details, selected chart positions, and sales figures
Title	Details	Peak chart positions	Sales
Title	Details	KOR	Sales
A Montage of ( )	Released: July 8, 2025; Label: BPM Entertainment; Formats: CD, digital download, streaming	7	KOR: 67,159

=== Extended plays ===
List of extended plays, showing selected details, selected chart positions, and sales figures
Title	Details	Peak chart positions		Sales
Title	Details	KOR	JPN	Sales
Beam of Prism	Released: February 9, 2022; Label: BPM Entertainment; Formats: CD, digital download, streaming	2	42	KOR: 54,979; JPN: 1,141 (Phy.)
Summer Vibe	Released: July 6, 2022; Label: BPM Entertainment; Formats: CD, digital download, streaming	8	45	KOR: 79,460; JPN: 1,005 (Phy.)
Various	Released: January 31, 2023; Label: BPM Entertainment; Formats: CD, digital download, streaming	4	40	KOR: 82,622; JPN: 1,286 (Phy.)
Versus	Released: November 2, 2023; Label: BPM Entertainment; Formats: CD, digital download, streaming	9	—	KOR: 56,146
Voyage	Released: November 7, 2024; Label: BPM Entertainment; Formats: CD, digital download, streaming	14	—	KOR: 38,513
"—" denotes a recording that did not chart or was not released in that territory.

=== Singles ===
List of singles, showing year released, selected chart positions, and name of the album
Title	Year	Peak chart positions				Album
Title	Year	KOR Circle	KOR Songs	SGP Reg.	US World	Album
"Bop Bop!"	2022	102	60	—	5	Beam of Prism
"Loveade"	2022	191	—	—	—	Summer Vibe
"Pull Up"	2023	151	—	—	—	Various
"Maniac"	2023	14	14	19	—	Versus
"Shhh!"	2024	— (Note: "Shhh!" did not enter the Circle Digital Chart, but it peaked at number 18 on the component Circle Download Chart.)	—	—	—	Voyage
"La La Love Me"	2025	188	—	—	—	A Montage of ( )
"—" denotes a recording that did not chart or was not released in that territory.

=== Promotional singles ===
List of promotional singles, showing year released, with selected chart positions, and name of the album
Title	Year	Peak chart positions	Album
Title	Year	KOR Down.	Album
"Rum Pum Pum" (Note: "Rum Pum Pum" was released as a promotional single in collaboration with Universe.)	2022	40	Non-album single

=== Soundtrack appearances ===
List of soundtracks, showing year released, selected chart positions, and name of the album
Title	Year	Peak chart positions	Album
Title	Year	KOR Down.	Album
"Come On Baby Tonight" (늘 지금처럼)	2022	39	Ditto OST Part 5
"Make Me Love U"	2023	130	True to Love OST Part 7
"Spoiler"	2023	88	My Lovely Liar OST Part 1

=== Other charted songs ===
List of other charted songs, showing year released, selected chart positions, and name of the album
Title	Year	Peak chart positions	Album
Title	Year	KOR Down.	Album
"Intro"	2022	81	Beam of Prism
"Fiesta"	2022	40	Beam of Prism
"Tweet Tweet"	2022	47	Beam of Prism
"Lemonade"	2022	46	Beam of Prism
"Love You Like"	2022	41	Beam of Prism
"Mirror" (거울아)	2022	34	Beam of Prism
"Time for the Glory"	2022	88	Queendom 2 Part 1-1
"Unnatural"	2022	104	Queendom 2 Part 2-2
"Purr" (with Kep1er as Kev1z)	2022	118	Queendom 2 Position Unit Battle Part 1-2
"Bop Bop!" (Highteen version)	2022	159	Queendom 2 Fantastic Queendom 1-1
"Red Sun!" (환상)	2022	65	Queendom 2 Final
"Siesta"	2022	78	Summer Vibe
"Party Pop"	2022	79	Summer Vibe
"Love Love Love"	2022	67	Summer Vibe
"#Flashback"	2022	91	Summer Vibe
"Dance" (춤)	2022	92	Summer Vibe
"Blue Clue"	2023	42	Various
"Love or Die"	2023	54	Various
"Vanilla Sugar Killer"	2023	52	Various
"Overdrive"	2023	50	Various
"So Special"	2023	55	Various
"Untie"	2023	98	Versus
"Up 2 Me"	2023	103	Versus
"한 걸음 (Day by Day)"	2023	108	Versus
"Overflow"	2023	109	Versus

=== Collaborative singles ===
List of collaborative singles, showing year released, and name of the album
Title	Year	Album
"Memory of the Moon" (꿈속의 문) (with Astro, I.M, Seungkwan, Bang Chan, Moon Sua, Minhyuk, Kihyun, Hoshi, Wonwoo, Mingyu, Chani, DK, Hello Gloom, Choi Yoo-jung, Kim Do-yeon)	2025	Non-album singles

== Videography ==
=== Music videos ===
List of songs, showing year released, and name of the directors
Title	Year	Director(s)	Ref.
"Bop Bop!"	2022	Yeom Woo-jin	
"Loveade"	2022	Shin Hee-won (st-wt)	
"Rum Pum Pum"	2022	Studio Saipens	
"Pull Up"	2023	Kim Ja-kyoung (Flexible Pictures)	
"Maniac"	2023	Kim Ja-kyoung (Flexible Pictures)	
"Shhh!"	2024	Unknown	
"La La Love Me"	2025	Unknown	

== Filmography ==
=== Television shows ===
Year	Title	Role	Ref.
2022	Queendom 2	Contestant	

== Concerts and tours ==
=== World tours ===
- V.hind: Love and Tears (2024)
- New Legacy (2025)

== Awards and nominations ==
Name of the award ceremony, year presented, category, nominee of the award, and the result of the nomination
Award ceremony	Year	Category	Nominee / Work	Result	Ref.
Brand of the Year Awards	2022	Female Rookie Idol of the Year	Viviz	Won	
Hanteo Music Awards	2023	Emerging Artist	Viviz	Won	
Hanteo Music Awards	2023	Popular Performance Group	Viviz	Won	
K-Global Heart Dream Awards	2022	K-Global Hot Star Award	Viviz	Won	
Universal Superstar Awards	2024	Universal Social Icon	Viviz	Won	
