= BPM Entertainment =

South Korean entertainment company

- Native name: 빅플래닛메이드
- Type: Private
- Industry: Entertainment
- Genre: K-pop; R&B; dance-pop
- Founded: July 6, 2021; 5 years ago
- Founder: MC Mong; Park Jang-geun
- Headquarters: Gangnam-gu, Seoul, South Korea
- Key people: Kim Dong-jun (CEO); Gil Jong-hwa (management representative)
- Parent: One Hundred (2023–present); Fact Invest (2021–2023)
- Website: bpment.co.kr

BPM Entertainment (Korean: 빅플래닛메이드), also known as Big Planet Made, was a South Korean entertainment company established in 2021. Co-founded by rapper MC Mong and Duble Sidekick member Park Jang-geun, it is a subsidiary of the company One Hundred. BPM had a strategic alliance with Swing Entertainment, a subsidiary of CJ ENM, and Million Market, another subsidiary of One Hundred.

The company is best known as the home to the girl group Badvillain and solo artists Ha Sung-woon, Lee Mu-jin, and Ren.

== History ==
=== 2021–2022: Founding and expansion ===
BPM Entertainment was founded in July 2021 by rapper MC Mong and Duble Sidekick member Park Jang-geun. On September 29, 2021, Soyou signed with BPM Entertainment after leaving Starship Entertainment. She became the first artist to sign with the company. On October 6, it was announced that former GFriend members, Eunha, SinB and Umji, signed a contract with BPM Entertainment to debut as a trio after leaving Source Music. On October 8, 2021, it was announced their new group name would be Viviz. On October 27, Huh Gak signed with BPM Entertainment after his contract with IST Entertainment expired.

On October 29, Big Planet Made announced that they had signed a memorandum of understanding with Million Market and Swing Entertainment, thus forming a strategic alliance and business agreement. On December 24, former Hotshot and Wanna One member Ha Sung-woon signed a contract with BPM Entertainment after the expiration of his contract with Star Crew Entertainment. Viviz debuted on February 9, 2022, with the EP Beam of Prism.

On March 1, 2022, it was announced that Lee Mu-jin had signed an exclusive contract with the company. On March 8, Be'O signed a management deal with BPM Entertainment. On April 29, actress Jo Soo-min signed an exclusive contract with the company. She is the first actress to be signed under BPM Entertainment. On May 3, Mighty Mouth signed an exclusive contract with BPM Entertainment. On May 7, former NU'EST member Ren signed an exclusive contract with BPM Entertainment after the expiration of his contract with Pledis Entertainment. MC Mong resigned as director in November 2022 but remained associated with the company through its affiliation with Million Market. Park Jang-geun became the CEO.

=== 2023–present ===
In November 2023, Cha Ga-won, chairman of p-Arc Group, became the company's biggest shareholder, and acquired Million Market from SM Entertainment. On December 5, BPM announced that they had recruited Kim Dong-jun, former CEO of SM C&C, as CEO, with the intention of expanding MC management and content. On December 12, 2023, the company One Hundred was established as the parent company of BPM through joint investment by Cha Ga-won and MC Mong, led by Park Jang-geun as the general producer.

On January 1, 2024, Mighty Mouth revealed on social media that they had left the company. On February 1, 2024, it was revealed that Soyou would be leaving the company after in-depth discussions. On April 1, 2024, Shinee member Taemin signed a contract with the company for his solo promotions. On April 18, 2024, Lee Soo-geun became the first entertainer to join the company. On April 29, 2024, it was revealed that Lee Seung-gi had signed a contract with the company. On June 3, 2024, BPM debuted their second girl group Badvillain.

== Artists ==
=== Groups ===
- Badvillain

=== Soloists ===
- Ha Sung-woon

=== Entertainers ===
- Lee Soo-geun

== Former artists ==
- Jo Soo-min (2022)
- Mighty Mouth (2022–2024)
- Soyou (2021–2024)
- Huh Gak (2021–2024)
- Kany
- Taemin (2024–2026)
- Viviz (2021–2026)
- Be'O (2022–2026)
- Lee Mu-jin (2022–2026)
- Lee Seung-gi (2024-2026)
- Ren (2024-2026)
- Kasper

== Controversies ==
=== Poaching allegations ===
In June 2023, SM Entertainment said that an external company, reported to be BPM, had attempted to poach the Exo members Baekhyun, Chen and Xiumin. MC Mong was said to have influenced the Exo members to sign a contract with BPM, in violation of their exclusive contracts with SM. This was denied by both BPM and MC Mong. SM later withdrew the allegations and apologised. The following month, media outlet TenAsia obtained a transcript of a conversation in which MC Mong described attempting to recruit Baekhyun and his fellow Exo member Kai, appearing to contradict previous denials. In May 2024, BPM's parent company, One Hundred, incorporated Baekhyun's company, INB100, as a subsidiary. In a press release announcing the decision, One Hundred said that BPM and INB100 had "become one family". One Hundred said that BPM could provide the infrastructure INB100 needed, while BPM and One Hundred would gain a powerful IP.

== Discography ==
=== 2022 ===
Released	Title	Artist	Type	Format	Language	Ref.
February 9	Beam of Prism	Viviz	Extended play	CD, digital download, streaming	Korean	
April 12	"Love Me"	Be'O	Digital single	Digital download, streaming	Korean	
April 27	Day & Night	Soyou	Extended play	CD, digital download, streaming	Korean	
June 23	Room Vol.1	Lee Mu-jin	Extended play	CD, digital download, streaming	Korean	
July 6	Summer Vibe	Viviz	Extended play	CD, digital download, streaming	Korean	
August 24	Strange World	Ha Sung-woon	Extended play	CD, digital download, streaming	Korean	
September 29	Five Senses	Be'O	Extended play	CD, digital download, streaming	Korean	

=== 2023 ===
Released	Title	Artist	Type	Format	Language	Ref.
January 31	Various	Viviz	Extended play	CD, digital download, streaming	Korean	
June 13	Ren'dezvous	Ren	Extended play	CD, digital download, streaming	Korean	
July 26	Summer Recipe	Soyou	Extended play	CD, digital download, streaming	Korean	
November 2	Versus	Viviz	Extended play	CD, digital download, streaming	Korean	

=== 2024 ===
Released	Title	Artist	Type	Format	Language	Ref.
April 24	Affection	Be'O	Extended play	CD, digital download, streaming	Korean	
June 3	Overstep	Badvillain	Single album	CD, digital download, streaming	Korean	
August 19	Eternal	Taemin	Extended play	CD, digital download, streaming	Korean	
November 7	Voyage	Viviz	Extended play	CD, digital download, streaming	Korean	
