= Flame (Cravity song) =

Single by Cravity

from the album Season 2. Hideout: The New Day We Step Into
- Language: Korean
- Released: August 24, 2020
- Genre: Dance-pop
- Length: 3:14
- Label: Starship; Kakao
- Composers: Blair Taylor; Jisoo Park (153/Joombas); Jeff Lewis
- Lyricists: Brother Su; Da0 (makeumine works); JQ

Cravity singles chronology
"Break All the Rules" (2020)	"Flame" (2020)	"My Turn" (2021)

Music video
- "Flame" on YouTube

"Flame" is a song recorded by South Korean boy group Cravity for their second extended play Season 2. Hideout: The New Day We Step Into. It was released as the group's lead single on August 24, 2020, by Starship Entertainment in conjunction with the extended play. Written and produced by Blair Taylor, with additional songwriting credits by Brother Su, Da0 (makeumine works), and JQ, "Flame" is a song that expresses the burning desire of Cravity in testing their limits, and a powerful manifestation of determining another history.

== Background and release ==
On August 6, 2020, Starship Entertainment announced that Cravity would be releasing their second extended play, Season 2. Hideout: The New Day We Step Into, on August 24. On August 11, the track listing was released, with "Flame" announced as the lead single. On August 22, the music video teaser was released. The song was released alongside its music video and the extended play on August 24.

== Composition ==
Musically, "Flame" is a song that contains Cravity's passion, resembling a blazing flame that challenges the limit. It is an Urban-HipHop genre track armed with intense power as if testing their limits. The dynamic melody line that makes it impossible to relax which makes it impressive, and contains the members' bold message to face the hot summer.

== Commercial performance ==
"Flame" debuted at number 81 on South Korea's Circle Download Chart in the chart issue dated August 23–29, 2020. On the Billboard K-pop Hot 100, it debuted at number 97 in the chart issue dated October 10, becoming their first and only lead single to enter the chart thus far.

== Music video ==
The music video, directed by Sam Son of Highqualityfish, was released alongside the song by Starship Entertainment on August 24, 2020. The accompanying music video show's member and leader Serim confidently step towards the shining stage on a vast wilderness. Following him, the members headed to the stage, and Cravity, who finally reached the same stage, caught the eye with intense charisma, sparking sparks. In particular, Cravity shows passion and will like flames with a powerful performance that expresses powerful flapping of wings along with short but intense vocals saying "Fly towards the light".

== Promotion ==
Following the release of Season 2. Hideout: The New Day We Step Into, on August 24, 2020, Cravity held their second debut showcase through Naver V Live, entitled "Hideout: The New Day We Step Into". The group interacted and introduce the new album including "Flame" alongside performances of b-side tracks.

== Credits and personnel ==
Credits adapted from Bugs!.

- Cravity – vocals
- Blair Taylor – composition, arrangement
- Jisoo Park (153/Joombas) – composition
- Jeff Lewis – composition
- Brother Su - lyrics
- Da0 (makeumine works)- lyrics
- JQ - lyrics

== Charts ==
Weekly chart performance for "Flame"
Chart (2020)	Peak position
South Korea (K-pop Hot 100)	97
South Korea Download (Circle)	81

== Release history ==
Release history for "Flame"
Region	Date	Format	Label
Various	August 24, 2020	Digital download; streaming	Starship; Kakao
