= Gas Pedal (Cravity song) =

Single by Cravity

from the album The Awakening: Written in the Stars
- Language: Korean
- Released: August 19, 2021
- Genre: Dance-pop
- Length: 3:17
- Label: Starship; Kakao
- Composers: PCDC; Samuel Ku (PAPERMAKER)
- Lyricists: PCDC; Samuel Ku (PAPERMAKER); eddiesupa; Serim (Cravity); Allen (Cravity)

Cravity singles chronology
"My Turn" (2021)	"Gas Pedal" (2021)	"Adrenaline" (2022)

Music video
- "Gas Pedal" on YouTube

"Gas Pedal" is a song recorded by South Korean boy group Cravity for their first studio album, The Awakening: Written in the Stars. It was released as the group's lead single on August 19, 2021, by Starship Entertainment in conjunction with the studio album. Written by PCDC, Samuel Ku (PAPERMAKER), and eddiesupa, and arranged by PCDC, with additional songwriting credits by members Serim and Allen of Cravity, "Gas Pedal" is a song that shows how the up-and-coming rookie act aims to solidify their presence in the music scene, expressing their relentless drive for more climbing towards the peak following the stars.

== Composition ==
Musically, "Gas Pedal", is a song that expressed Cravity's unstoppable growth story under the theme of "accelerator pedal." A groovy hip-hop beat and fast-paced bass riff highlight the theme of the song.

== Commercial performance ==
"Gas Pedal" debuted at number 41 on South Korea's Circle Download Chart in the chart issue dated August 22–28, 2021.

== Music video ==
The music video, directed by Sam Son of Highqualityfish, was released alongside the song by Starship Entertainment on August 19, 2021. The accompanying music video opened with an eye-catching motorcycle race, giving a thrilling pleasure. Subsequently, Cravity's appearance in red and white circuit suits appears alternately, the sharp eyes are basic, and each member's rough charisma is stealing attention. In particular, Cravity showed an intense yet sharply synchronized dance in accordance with the highlight lyrics of "Gas Pedal," which showed a wild visual beauty and energetic mood as if watching a cyberpunk movie through the music video.

== Promotion ==
Following the release of The Awakening: Written in the Stars, on August 19, 2021, Cravity held their fourth showcase through Naver V Live, entitled "Cravity 1st Album Comeback Showcase [The Awakening]". The group interacted and introduced the new album, including the first stage performance of "Gas Pedal" alongside performances of b-side tracks. The group also shared behind-the-scenes stories about the lead single, along with their own impressions of it.

== Credits and personnel ==
Credits adapted from Bugs!.

- Cravity – vocals
- PCDC – composition, arrangement, lyrics
- Samuel Ku (PAPERMAKER) – composition, lyrics
- eddiesupa – composition, lyrics
- Serim (Cravity) – lyrics
- Allen (Cravity) – lyrics

== Charts ==
Weekly chart performance for "Gas Pedal"
Chart (2020)	Peak position
South Korea Download (Circle)	41

== Release history ==
Release history for "Gas Pedal"
Region	Date	Format	Label
Various	August 19, 2021	Digital download; streaming	Starship; Kakao
