= List of Circle Album Chart number ones of 2022 =

The Circle Album Chart, known as the Gaon Album Chart until its July 2022 rebranding, is a South Korean record chart that ranks the best-selling albums and EPs in South Korea. It is part of the Circle Chart, which launched in February 2010. The data is compiled by the Ministry of Culture, Sports and Tourism and the Korea Music Content Industry Association based upon weekly/monthly physical album sales by major South Korean distributors such as Kakao Entertainment, YG Plus, Sony Music Korea, Warner Music Korea, Universal Music and Dreamus.

Following the announcement of the data for week 27 and the monthly chart of June, the Gaon Album Chart was rebranded to the Circle Album Chart in line with Gaon's rebranding to Circle. It was also announced that album sales would be published on the chart each week.

== Weekly charts ==
Week ending date	Album	Artist	Weekly sales	Ref.
January 1	Universe	NCT	Not disclosed	
January 8	First Impact	Kep1er	Not disclosed	
January 15	Dimension: Answer	Enhypen	Not disclosed	
January 22	2021 Winter SM Town: SMCU Express	SM Town	Not disclosed	
January 29	In:vite U	Pentagon	Not disclosed	
February 5	Crazy in Love	Itzy	Not disclosed	
February 12	Pilmography	Wonpil	Not disclosed	
February 19	The Second Step: Chapter One	Treasure	Not disclosed	
February 26	Young-Luv.com	STAYC	Not disclosed	
March 5	The Road: Winter for Spring	Super Junior	Not disclosed	
March 12	Ad Mare	Nmixx	Not disclosed	
March 19	Oddinary	Stray Kids	Not disclosed	
March 26	Liberty: In Our Cosmos	Cravity	Not disclosed	
April 2	Glitch Mode	NCT Dream	Not disclosed	
April 9	Love Dive	Ive	Not disclosed	
April 16	The ReVe Festival 2022 – Feel My Rhythm	Red Velvet	Not disclosed	
April 23	Glitch Mode	NCT Dream	Not disclosed	
April 30	Shape of Love	Monsta X	Not disclosed	
May 7	Im Hero	Lim Young-woong	Not disclosed	
May 14	Minisode 2: Thursday's Child	Tomorrow X Together	Not disclosed	
May 21	Drive to the Starry Road	Astro	Not disclosed	
May 28	Face the Sun	Seventeen	Not disclosed	
June 4	Beatbox	NCT Dream	Not disclosed	
June 11	Proof	BTS	Not disclosed	
June 18	Proof	BTS	Not disclosed	
June 25	Im Nayeon	Nayeon	Not disclosed	
July 2	From Our Memento Box	Fromis 9	138,182	
July 9	Girls	Aespa	1,426,487	
July 16	Checkmate	Itzy	700,000	
July 23	Sector 17	Seventeen	1,316,712	
July 30	The World EP.1: Movement	Ateez	810,232	
August 6	The World EP.1: Movement	Ateez	164,757	
August 13	New Jeans	NewJeans	335,588	
August 20	Be Aware	The Boyz	439,600	
August 27	After Like	Ive	1,081,201	
September 3	Gasoline	Key	81,461	
September 10	Malus	Oneus	157,314	
September 17	Born Pink	Blackpink	2,141,281	
September 24	Entwurf	Nmixx	483,736	
October 1	New Wave	Cravity	183,792	
October 8	Maxident	Stray Kids	1,602,930	
October 15	Maxident	Stray Kids	736,394	
October 22	I Love	(G)I-dle	637,090	
October 29	The Astronaut	Jin	508,662	
November 5	Maxident	Stray Kids	389,507	
November 12	The Astronaut	Jin	224,390	
November 19	Last Scene	Chen	85,171	
November 26	On and On	Tempest	86,392	
December 3	Cheshire	Itzy	779,525	
December 10	Proof	BTS	163,723	
December 17	The Road: Celebration	Super Junior	147,253	
December 24	Candy	NCT Dream	1,341,794	
December 31	Spin Off: From the Witness	Ateez	252,291	

== Monthly charts ==
Month	Album	Artist	Sales	Ref.
January	Dimension: Answer	Enhypen	723,478	
February	The Second Step: Chapter One	Treasure	617,748	
March	Glitch Mode	NCT Dream	1,646,949	
April	Love Dive	Ive	544,339	
May	Face the Sun	Seventeen	2,239,351	
June	Proof	BTS	2,957,410	
July	Girls	Aespa	1,645,255	
August	After Like	Ive	1,110,177	
September	Born Pink	Blackpink	2,457,206	
October	Maxident	Stray Kids	2,748,722	
November	Cheshire	Itzy	779,455	
December	Candy	NCT Dream	1,395,187	
