= Break All the Rules =

"Break All The Rules"

Single by Cravity

from the album Season 1. Hideout: Remember Who We Are
- Language: Korean
- Released: April 14, 2020
- Genre: Dance-pop
- Length: 3:28
- Label: Starship; Kakao
- Composers: Gionata Caracciolo; Val Del Prete(153/Joombas); Sean Michael Alexander; DREW RYAN SCOTT; Willie Weeks
- Lyricists: Seo Ji-eum; Wutan

Cravity singles chronology
"Break All The Rules" (2020)	"Flame" (2020)

Music video
- "Break All The Rules" on YouTube

"Break All The Rules" is a song recorded by South Korean boy group Cravity for their debut extended play Season 1. Hideout: Remember Who We Are. It was released as the group's debut single on April 14, 2020, by Starship Entertainment in conjunction with the extended play. Written and produced by Gionata Caracciolo and Willie Weeks, with additional songwriting credits by Seo Ji-eum and Wutan, "Break All The Rules" is a song that show-off the group's charismatic energy while filling the stage with powerful vocals, dynamic rapping and sharp dance moves.

== Background and release ==
On March 25, 2020, Starship Entertainment announced that Cravity would be releasing their debut extended play, Season 1. Hideout: Remember Who We Are, on April 14. On April 1, the track listing was released, with "Break All The Rules" announced as the lead single. On April 11, the music video teaser was released. The song was released alongside its music video and the extended play on April 14.

== Composition ==
Musically, "Break All The Rules" is an urban hip-hop genre with powerful drums, colorful vocal melodies, and impressive harmony, and contains the meaning of 'breaking the rules and frames that are confined to oneself'. In addition, it also stands out with a message of youth, a rough-textured sound, a powerful chorus, and an excellent rap-vocal line.

The song follows an intense melody that harmonizes with the gorgeous and powerful choreography, exuding the charm of unstoppable youth. In addition, the dance break scene in the second half of the stage shows excellent stage digestibility with stable vocals and rapping skills.

== Commercial performance ==
"Break All The Rules" debuted at number 67 on South Korea's Circle Download Chart in the chart issue dated April 12 to 18, 2020.

== Music video ==
The music video, directed by HQF (Highqualityfish), was released alongside the song by Starship Entertainment on April 14, 2020. The accompanying music video shows all Cravity members gathering in one place, starting with Wonjin, who holds a small cube in his hand, drawing attention. Afterwards, the members overwhelm the atmosphere with a mysterious mood, sitting with various objects such as flowers, cubes, and red threads in cubes filled with different colors. In particular, the gorgeous visuals that make it impossible to take your eyes off, the intense beat, and the vocals that create a cool and rough feel amplify curiosity about the new song.

== Promotion ==
Following the release of Season 1. Hideout: Remember Who We Are, on April 14, 2020, Cravity held their first debut showcase through Naver V Live, entitled "Hideout: Remember Who We Are". The group interacted and introduce the new album including "Break All The Rules" alongside performances of b-side tracks.

In April 20, Cravity successfully completed their debut stages with performances of the lead single "Break All The Rules" and their b-side track "Jumper," starting with Mnet's M Countdown on the 16th, KBS2's Music Bank on the 17th, MBC M's Show! Music Core on the 18th, and SBS Inkigayo on the 19th, capping off the first week of promotions.

On the following week, Cravity appeared on SBS MTV The Show on the 21st and MBC Show Champion on the 22nd, followed by performances on M Countdown, Music Bank, and Music Core, and completed their second week of promotion on the 26th on SBS Inkigayo.

Cravity completed their music show promotions through another week of performances on all major music shows, with their third week of promotion again coming to a close on SBS Inkigayo on May 3.

Cravity also performed "Break All The Rules" on entertainment program Weekly Idol. In April 21, Cravity appeared on MBC's FM4U Kim Shinyoung: Noon Song of Hope and on the standard FM Idol Radio on the following day.

== Credits and personnel ==
Credits adapted from Bugs!.

- Cravity – vocals
- Gionata Caracciolo – composition, arrangement
- Willie Weeks – composition, arrangement
- Val del Prete (153/Joombas) - composition
- Sean Michael Alexander - composition
- DREW RYAN SCOTT - composition
- Seo Ji-eum - lyrics
- Wutan - lyrics
- James F. Reynolds - Mixer

== Charts ==
Weekly chart performance for "Groovy"
Chart (2020)	Peak position
South Korea Download (Circle)	67

== Release history ==
Release history for "Break All The Rules"
Region	Date	Format	Label
Various	April 14, 2020	Digital download; streaming	Starship; Kakao
