= My Turn (Cravity song) =

Single by Cravity

from the album Season 3. Hideout: Be Our Voice
- Language: Korean
- Released: January 19, 2021
- Genre: Dance-pop
- Length: 3:33
- Label: Starship; Kakao
- Composers: Harold Philippon; Keelah Jacobsen; Ryan S. Jhun; Cameron Jai
- Lyricist: Exy

Cravity singles chronology
"Flame" (2020)	"My Turn" (2021)	"Gas Pedal" (2021)

Music video
- "My Turn" on YouTube

"My Turn" is a song recorded by South Korean boy group Cravity for their third extended play Season 3. Hideout: Be Our Voice. It was released as the group's lead single on January 19, 2021, by Starship Entertainment in conjunction with the extended play. Written by Exy and arranged by Alawn, with additional songwriting credits by Harold Philippon, Keelah Jacobsen, Ryan S. Jhun, and Cameron Jai, "My Turn" is a song that expresses the group's desire for victory, showcasing overwhelming beauty with dynamic movement and intense energy, which symbolize the speed the group aims to achieve in their own race.

== Background and release ==
On December 21, 2020, Starship Entertainment announced that Cravity would be releasing their third extended play, Season 3. Hideout: Be Our Voice, on mid-January. On December 28, Cravity announced their comeback date to be held on the 19th of the next month. On December 29, the track listing was released, with "My Turn" announced as the lead single. On January 17, 2021, the music video teaser was released. The song was released alongside its music video and the extended play on January 19.

== Composition ==
Musically, "My Turn" is described as a song that shows the confidence of 'now it's our turn'. It is a song that heightens the atmosphere in the second half with its heavy bass sound and energetic beat. The song has been described as having minimal sound, heavy bass, and an addictive beat, with energetic and groovy vocals.

== Commercial performance ==
"My Turn" debuted at number 21 on South Korea's Circle Download Chart in the chart issue dated January 24–30, 2021.

== Music video ==
The music video, directed by Vishop of Vikings League, was released alongside the song by Starship Entertainment on January 19, 2021. The accompanying music video opened with Cravity standing on a stage covered with bright lights, then cut to a modest group dance and a spirited game of basketball. At the conclusion, the group exclaimed "Feel the new day," and at the same moment the basketball went into the goal post, adding an exciting thrill to the music video. In particular, Cravity also displayed a crazy explosion with motorcycle racing and basketball games on stage.

== Promotion ==
Following the release of Season 3. Hideout: Be Our Voice, on January 19, 2021, Cravity held their third showcase through Naver V Live, entitled "Cravity Season 3. Comeback Show [Be Our Voice]". The group interacted and introduced the new album, including the first stage performance of "My Turn" alongside performances of b-side tracks. The group also shared behind-the-scenes stories about the lead single, along with their own impressions of it.

== Credits and personnel ==
Credits adapted from Bugs!.

- Cravity – vocals
- Harold Philippon – composition
- Keelah Jacobsen – composition
- Ryan S. Jhun – composition
- Cameron Jai – composition
- Exy - lyrics
- Alawn - arrangement

== Charts ==
Weekly chart performance for "Flame"
Chart (2020)	Peak position
South Korea Download (Circle)	21

== Release history ==
Release history for "My Turn"
Region	Date	Format	Label
Various	January 19, 2021	Digital download; streaming	Starship; Kakao
