= List of Gaon Album Chart number ones of 2020 =

The Gaon Album Chart is a South Korean record chart that ranks the best-selling albums and EPs in South Korea. It is part of the Gaon Music Chart, which launched in February 2010. The data is compiled by the Ministry of Culture, Sports and Tourism and the Korea Music Content Industry Association based upon weekly/monthly physical album sales by major South Korean distributors such as Kakao M, YG Plus, Sony Music Korea, Warner Music Korea, Universal Music and Dreamus.

== Weekly charts ==
Week ending date	Album	Artist	Ref.
January 4	The ReVe Festival: Finale	Red Velvet	
January 11	Treasure Epilogue: Action to Answer	Ateez	
January 18	Love Song	Kim Jae-joong	
January 25	Love Song	Kim Jae-joong	
February 1	Timeless	Super Junior	
February 8	回:Labyrinth	GFriend	
February 15	Reveal	The Boyz	
February 22	Map of the Soul: 7	BTS	
February 29	Map of the Soul: 7	BTS	
March 7	Neo Zone	NCT 127	
March 14	It'z Me	Itzy	
March 21	Neo Zone	NCT 127	
March 28	Cyan	Kang Daniel	
April 4	Self-Portrait	Suho	
April 11	I Trust	(G)I-dle	
April 18	Season 1. Hideout: Remember Who We Are	Cravity	
April 25	Dye	Got7	
May 2	Reload	NCT Dream	
May 9	Gateway	Astro	
May 16	The Nocturne	NU'EST	
May 23	Neo Zone: The Final Round	NCT 127	
May 30	Delight	Baekhyun	
June 6	More & More	Twice	
June 13	When We Were Us	Super Junior-K.R.Y.	
June 20	Go Live	Stray Kids	
June 27	Heng:garæ	Seventeen	
July 4	Delight	Baekhyun	
July 11	Heng:garæ	Seventeen	
July 18	1 Billion Views	Exo-SC	
July 25	How You Like That	Blackpink	
August 1	Zero: Fever Part.1	Ateez	
August 8	Magenta	Kang Daniel	
August 15	The First Step: Chapter One	Treasure	
August 22	Not Shy	Itzy	
August 29	Season 2. Hideout: The New Day We Step Into	Cravity	
September 5	Love Synonym Pt.1: Right for Me	Wonho	
September 12	Never Gonna Dance Again: Act 1	Taemin	
September 19	In Life	Stray Kids	
September 26	We Are Family	Kim Ho-joong	
October 3	Bad Liar	Super Junior-D&E	
October 10	The Album	Blackpink	
October 17	NCT 2020 Resonance Pt. 1	NCT	
October 24	Semicolon	Seventeen	
October 31	Super One	SuperM	
November 7	Fatal Love	Monsta X	
November 14	The First Step: Chapter Three	Treasure	
November 21	Be	BTS	
November 28	Journey	Henry	
December 5	NCT 2020 Resonance Pt. 2	NCT	
December 12	One-reeler / Act IV	Iz*One	
December 19	The Classic Album I – My Favorite Arias	Kim Ho-joong	
December 26	NCT 2020 Resonance Pt. 2	NCT	

== Monthly charts ==
Month	Album	Artist	Sales	Ref.
January	Treasure Epilogue: Action to Answer	Ateez	128,273	
February	Map of the Soul: 7	BTS	4,114,843	
March	Neo Zone	NCT 127	723,150	
April	Dye	Got7	339,737	
May	Delight	Baekhyun	660,826	
June	Heng:garæ	Seventeen	1,207,513	
July	1 Billion Views	Exo-SC	497,325	
August	Magenta	Kang Daniel	330,824	
September	We Are Family	Kim Ho-joong	441,201	
October	NCT 2020 Resonance Pt. 1	NCT	1,193,394	
November	Be	BTS	2,655,843	
December	NCT 2020 Resonance Pt. 2	NCT	705,588	
