= Brother Su =

- 김형수
- Born: Kim Hyung-soo; December 22, 1990 (age 35); South Korea
- Years active: 2010–present
- Spouse: Kim Jin-ah (m. 2023)
- Relatives: Lovey (sister)
- Musical career
- Origin: Seoul, South Korea
- Genres: R&B; Urban
- Labels: RealCollabo (2010–2015); Starship Entertainment (2015–present)
- Website: starship-ent.com/brothersu

Korean name
- Hangul: 김형수
- RR: Gim Hyeongsu
- MR: Kim Hyŏngsu

Kim Hyung-soo (Korean: 김형수; born December 22, 1990), better known as Brother Su (브라더수), is a South Korean singer-songwriter and record producer. Su debuted in 2010 and has been signed under Starship Entertainment's subsidiary label Starship X since 2015.

== Career ==
=== 2010–2015: Early work and RealCollabo ===
Prior to his debut, Brother Su participated in "Christmas Card from Real Collabo" with his remix of "Winter Wonderland". The next year he officially debuted as RealCollabo's first singer with single "It was You". In the same year, he released another single "You Got Me".

The following years, Brother Su started featuring and writing for his label mates as well as other artists. Started with featuring in Mad Clown's "Basil", he was also featured in Andup's "Like This Right Now", Giriboy's "Player", Cheeze's "Papapa", d.ear's "We Need to Talk", Kebee's "Travel Bag", and Swings's "Two Thumbs". He produced label mate Siaena's "Sound of Rain" and Lovey's "Return", as well as Crucial Star's "Flat Shoes". In his early years as a lyricist, Brother Su teamed up with Ra.D for Jooyoung's "All of You" and "Hang Up the Phone", and Ra.D's "Thank You, Thank You".

On July 4, 2013 he released his first full album Paper, containing ten self-composed songs.

In 2015, Brother Su established his name as songwriter. His composed song, "I Need U" by BTS won first place in music programs. This success was followed with "Eat" by Zion.T, which did very well in South Korean digital music charts.

In the same year, he released his first mini album 사이 (Space) with six self-composed songs. "Space" was Brother Su's last release under RealCollabo. RealCollabo closed in October 2015.

=== 2015–present: Starship Entertainment ===
On October 7, Starship Entertainment announced Brother Su has joined the company. A few days later, he released his first soundtrack, "You Don't Know Me" for MBC drama, She Was Pretty. This duet song with Soyou of Sistar was the song that introduced Brother Su to broader public.

Together with Jooyoung, Brother Su took part on collaboration with his old label mates Ra.D and d.ear, releasing "Draw You". It is a remake of d.ear's old song which is also the last release of RealCollabo. He was featured in San E & Mad Clown's "Lonely Animals" released in November 2015. Starship Planet's 2015 winter song "Softly" was his first participation in the company's family song.

In February 2016, Brother Su along with K.Will, Junggigo, and Jooyoung released a special Valentine's song, "Cook for Love". A few days later, he released a duet song with Mad Clown, "Like Romance Comics".

== Personal life ==
He has a younger sister, Lovey, who is also a singer-songwriter.

On April 24, 2023, Starship Entertainment announced that he will hold a wedding ceremony with singer-songwriter and lyricist Kim Jin-ah, who is three years his junior, on May 13 at a hotel in Jung-gu, Seoul.

== Discography ==
=== Studio albums ===
Title	Album details	Peak chart positions
Title	Album details	KOR
Paper	Released: July 4, 2013; Label: RealCollabo; Format: CD, digital download; Track list: 1. Intro (늦잠); 2. 왜 이러니 (Why are You Like This) (feat. Swings); 3. 소심해서 그래 (Because I'm Timid) (feat. Cheeze); 4. 윗집 여자 (Girl Next Doorl); 5. 좋대요 (Said Like You); 6. I'm With You (feat. Ra.D); 7. 다른 별 (Different Star) (feat. Lovey); 8. 팔베개 (Arm Pillow); 9. Outro (늦잠); 10. It Was You (Bonus Track)	93

=== Extended plays ===
Title	Album details	Peak chart positions
Title	Album details	KOR
Space (사이)	Released: June 19, 2015; Label: RealCollabo; Format: CD, digital download; Track list: 1. Intro: 사이 (Space) (Space); 2. 점 (Dot) (feat. Lovey); 3. 아쉬워서 그렇지 (Because I'm Sorry) (feat. Giriboy); 4. 그럼 됐어 (That's Okay); 5. 왜 하필 (Of All Odds, Why); 6. 반나절만 (Only Half the Day)	63

=== Singles ===
Title	Year	Peak chart positions	Sales	Album
Title	Year	KOR	Sales	Album
As lead artist
"It Was You"	2010	—		Non-album singles
"You Got Me"	2010	—		Non-album singles
"Girl Next Door" (윗집 여자)	2013	—		Paper
"아쉬워서 그렇지" (Because I Feel Bad) (feat. Giriboy)	2015	—	KOR: 15,400	Space
"Dot" (점) (feat. Lovey)	2015	—		Space
"What's Wrong With U" (왜그러냐) (feat. Gaeko)	2018	—		Non-album single
Collaborations
"Draw You" (너를 그리다) (with Ra.D, d.ear, Jooyoung)	2015	25	KOR: 51,818	Non-album single
"Softly" (사르르) (with K.Will, Sistar, Boyfriend, Mad Clown, Junggigo, Jooyoung, Monsta X, Yoo Seung-woo, Exy)	2015	24	KOR: 154,049	Starship Planet 2015
"Cook for Love" (요리좀해요) (with K.Will, Junggigo, and Jooyoung)	2016	23	KOR: 72,767	Non-album singles
"Like Romance Comics" (만화처럼) (with Mad Clown)	2016	17	KOR: 125,593	Non-album singles
"Our Night Is More Beautiful Than Your Day" (우리의 밤은 당신의 낮보다 아름답다) (with Bomi, Namjoo, Chaeyeon, LE, Seokhoon, ₩uNo, Yang Da-il, Chancellor, Seo In-young, Kang Min-hee)	2016	89	KOR: 28,346	Merry Summer
"Madeleine" (마들렌) (with I.M, feat. J.Han)	2016	—		Non-album single
"Love Wishes" (누가 그래) (with Junggigo, Mad Clown, Yoo Seung-woo, Hyunseong, Kihyun)	2016	77	KOR: 48,485	Starship Planet 2016
"Christmas Day" (with K.Will, Soyou, Boyfriend, Monsta X, Cosmic Girls, Mad Clown, Junggigo, #Gun, Yoo Seung-woo, Mind U, Duetto, Jeong Se-woon, Lee Kwang-hyun)	2017	63	KOR: 49,521	Starship Planet 2017
"Christmas Time" (벌써 크리스마스) (with Duetto, Mind U, Yoo Seung-woo, Monsta X, Jeong Se-woon, K.Will, Boyfriend, Soyou, Cosmic Girls)	2018	93		Starship Planet 2018
"—" denotes release did not chart.

=== Soundtrack appearances ===
Title	Year	Peak chart positions	Sales	Album
Title	Year	KOR	Sales	Album
"You Don't Know Me" (모르나봐) (with Soyou)	2015	4	KOR: 734,063	She Was Pretty OST
"Come to Me" (내게 올래요)	2016	87	KOR: 42,407	Don't Dare to Dream OST
"Toy" (서툰 고백) (with Yoo Yeon-jung)	2017	—		Love Playlist 2 OST
"While You Were Sleeping" (당신이 잠든 사이에) (with SE O)	2017	—		While You Were Sleeping OST
"—" denotes release did not chart.

== Production credits ==
Year	Title	Artist	Album	Role
2010	"It Was You"	Brother Su	Non-album single	Composer, lyricist, arranger
2012	"빗소리가 (Sound of Rain)"	Siaena	Café de Siaena	Arranger
2012	"All of You"	Jooyoung	From Me to You	Co-lyricist
2012	"Hang Up the Phone" featuring Ra.D & Inbal	Jooyoung	From Me to You	Co-lyricist
2012	"Flat Shoes"	Crucial Star	Fall	Producer
2013	"We Need to Talk"	d.ear	Love Graphy	Co-lyricist
2013	"돌려줘 (Return)"	Lovey	Non-album single	Composer, lyricist, arranger
2013	"늦잠 (Intro)"	Brother Su	Paper	Composer, lyricist, arranger
2013	"왜 이러니 (Why Are You Like This)"	Brother Su	Paper	Composer, co-lyricist, arranger
2013	"소심해서 그래 (Because I'm Timid)" featuring Dalcong	Brother Su	Paper	Composer, lyricist, co-arranger
2013	"윗집 여자 (Upstairs Neighbor Girl)"	Brother Su	Paper	Composer, lyricist, co-arranger
2013	"좋대요 (Said Like You)"	Brother Su	Paper	Composer, lyricist, co-arranger
2013	"I'm With You" featuring Ra.D	Brother Su	Paper	Composer, lyricist, co-arranger
2013	"다른 별 (Different Star)" featuring Lovey	Brother Su	Paper	Composer, lyricist, co-arranger
2013	"팔베개 (Arm Pillow)"	Brother Su	Paper	Composer, lyricist, co-arranger
2013	"늦잠 (Outro)"	Brother Su	Paper	Composer, lyricist, co-arranger
2013	"고마워 고마워 (Thank You, Thank You)"	Ra.D	작은 이야기 (Small Story)	Co-lyricist
2013	"누군가 필요해 (I Need Someone)" featuring Brother Su	Ra.D	Non-album single	Co-composer, co-lyricist
2014	"Super Crucial Rap 2" featuring DJ Wegun	Crucial Star	Non-album single	Composer, arranger
2014	"겨울인데 (It's Winter)" featuring Tim	Pento	Non-album single	Arranger
2014	"클럽이라도 좀 가 (At Least Go to Club)"	Heize	Maktoob	Co-composer, arranger
2014	"Good Life" featuring D.Meanor & Brother Su	Konsoul	Non-album single	Co-lyricist
2014	"여전해 (As Ever)"	AndUp	Non-album single	Co-composer, arranger
2014	"Give It 2 U"	Glam	Non-album single	Composer, lyricist
2014	"좋아요 (I Like It) (Slow Jam Remix)"	BTS	Skool Luv Affair: Special Addition	Co-composer, co-lyricist
2014	"Best Girl"	Ulala Session	reJOYce	Co-lyricist
2014	"그녀는 예뻐 (She is Pretty)"	Ulala Session	reJOYce	Co-lyricist
2014	"Heartache"	Ulala Session	reJOYce	Co-lyricist
2015	"왕복 30분 (Round Trip 30 Minutes)" featuring Shin Ji Soo	Giriboy	성인식 (Coming of Age Ceremony)	Co-composer, co-arranger
2015	"비가 내려와 (It's Raining)"	Zia, Lee Hyun	Non-album single	Co-composer, co-lyricist
2015	"I Need U"	BTS	The Most Beautiful Moment In Life, Part 1	Co-composer, co-lyricist
2015	"꺼내 먹어요 (Eat)"	Zion.T	Non-album single	Co-composer, co-arranger
2015	"Intro: 사이 (Space)"	Brother Su	사이 (Space)	Composer, arranger
2015	"점 (Dot)" featuring Lovey	Brother Su	사이 (Space)	Composer, lyricist, co-arranger
2015	"아쉬워서 그렇지 (Because I'm Sorry)" featuring Giriboy	Brother Su	사이 (Space)	Composer, co-lyricist, arranger
2015	"그럼 됐어 (That's Okay)"	Brother Su	사이 (Space)	Composer, lyricist, co-arranger
2015	"왜 하필 (Of All Odds, Why)"	Brother Su	사이 (Space)	Composer, lyricist, co-arranger
2015	"반나절만 (Only Half the Day)"	Brother Su	사이 (Space)	Composer, lyricist, arranger
2015	"여전히 (Still)"	Ra.D	Non-album single	Composer, lyricist
2015	"어깨 (Lean on Me)"	Soyou & Kwon Jung-yeol	Non-album single	Lyricist
2015	"Beautiful Lady"	Jonghyun	Oh My Venus OST Pt. 1	Co-lyricist
2015	"Butterfly"	BTS	The Most Beautiful Moment In Life, Part 2	Co-composer, co-lyricist, co-arranger
2015	"Whalien 52"	BTS	The Most Beautiful Moment In Life, Part 2	Co-composer, co-lyricist, co-arranger
2015	"Outro: House of Cards"	BTS	The Most Beautiful Moment In Life, Part 2	Co-composer, co-lyricist, co-arranger
2015	"호구 (Hogu)" featuring Brother Su	Giriboy	Non-album single	Co-composer, co-lyricist
2016	"그 벤치 (That Bench)"	Crucial Star	Non-album single	Co-composer, co-arranger
2016	"시간낭비 (Time Machine)" featuring EZ	Crucial Star	Non-album single	Co-composer, co-arranger
2016	"뭐 어때 (Whatever)" featuring Crucial Star	Yoo Seung-woo	Pit a Pat	Co-lyricist
2016	"선 (45.7cm)" featuring Oohyo	Yoo Seung-woo	Pit a Pat	Composer, lyricist, co-arranger
2016	"만화처럼 (Like Romance Comics)"	Mad Clown & Brother Su	Non-album single	Co-composer, co-arranger
2016	"야 하고 싶어 (Call You Bae)"	Jimin & Xiumin	Non-album single	Co-lyricist
2016	"Interview"	Eric Nam	Interview	Composer, lyricist, arranger
2016	"돌아오지마 (Don't Come Back)" featuring Junhyung	Heize	Non-album single	Co-composer, arranger
2016	"문 열어봐 (Here I Am)"	Yesung	Here I Am	Co-composer, co-lyricist
2016	"어떤 말로도 (Confession)" featuring Chanyeol	Yesung	Here I Am	Co-composer, co-lyricist
2016	"힘 (Strength)" featuring Hanhae & Brother Su	Crucial Star	Non-album single	Co-composer, co-lyricist
2016	"걸어 (All In)"	Monsta X	The Clan Pt. 1 Lost	Co-composer
2016	"천천히 나와요 (Come Slowly)"	Lovey	24	Arranger
2016	"너만이 (Only U)" featuring Heize	Yoo Seung-woo	Non-album single	Composer, Co-lyricist, Arranger
2016	"여자 사람 친구 (She)"	Vromance	The Action	Co-lyricist
2016	"우리 둘 (Runnin')"	Henry and Soyou		Co-lyricist
2016	"마들렌 (Madeleine)" featuring J.Han	I.M and Brother Su		Co-lyricist
2016	"이뻐서 힘들어" featuring Geeks' Lui, Brother Su, Lovey	Crucial Star	Fall 2	Co-lyricist
2016	"One Step" featuring Jay Park	Hyolyn	It's Me	Co-lyricist
2016	"Love Like This" featuring Dok2	Hyolyn	It's Me	Co-lyricist
2016	"꺼져 (Back Off)"	Hyolyn	It's Me	Co-lyricist
2016	"Dope"	Hyolyn	It's Me	Co-lyricist
2016	"누가 그래 (Love Wishes)"	Junggigo, Mad Clown, Yoo Seungwoo, Brother Su, Hyunsung, Kihyun	Starship Planet 2016	Co-lyricist
2017	"보여줄 때"	Kim Taegyun	녹색이념	Co-composer, arranger
2017	"이리 와 (Hug U)"	Cosmic Girls	From. WJSN	Composer, co-lyricist, arranger
2017	"Let Me Love You"	Junggigo, Chanyeol	Non-album single	Co-lyricist, co-composer
2017	"Oi"	Monsta X	The Clan Pt. 2.5: The Final Chapter	Co-lyricist, co-composer
2017	"Fall in Love"	K.Will	The 4th Album Pt.1 Nonfiction	Co-lyricist, co-composer
2017	"As If It's Your Last"	Blackpink	Non-album single	Co-lyricist
2018	"나눠서 좋아해줘"	Jina	나눠서 좋아해줘	Co-arranger
2018	"20 Something (PROD. 정동환, Jeong Se-woon)"	Jeong Se-woon	Another	Co-lyricist
2018	"Eye 2 Eye (PROD. Caesar & Loui)"	Jeong Se-woon	Another	Co-lyricist
2018	"나만 없어 (Feat. Brother Su)"	Mind U	퍼즐 - 두 번째 조각	Co-composer, co-lyricist, arranger
2018	"Underwater"	Monsta X	Take.1 Are You There?	Co-composer, co-lyricist
2018	"착해지지 마요 (Feat. 화사 of 마마무)"	K.Will	The 4th Album Part.2 [想像; Mood Indigo]	Lyricist
2018	"Welcome To My Playground"	NCT 127	Regulate	Co-composer, co-lyricist
2018	"Later"	Taeil	Non-album single	Composer, Lyricist, arranger
2019	"12 O'clock"	Cosmic Girls	WJ Stay?	Co-composer, co-lyricist
2019	"No Reason"	Monsta X	Take.2 We Are Here	Co-composer, co-lyricist
2019	"Stealer"	Monsta X	Take.2 We Are Here	Co-composer
2019	"Party Time"	Monsta X	Take.2 We Are Here	Co-composer, co-lyricist
2019	"Find You"	Monsta X	Follow: Find You	Co-lyricist
2019	"Follow"	Monsta X	Follow: Find You	Co-lyricist
2019	"Monsta Truck"	Monsta X	Follow: Find You	Co-lyricist
2019	"Mirror"	Monsta X	Follow: Find You	Co-lyricist, Co-composer
2019	"Selfish"	Kang Min-kyung	Kang Min Kyung Vol. 1	Co-composer
2019	"너여서 (My Youth)"	Kang Min-kyung	Kang Min Kyung Vol. 1	Composer, Lyricist, arranger
2019	"Slow"	Bumsoo Kim	New.Make20 #5	Lyricist
2019	"D+1"	Everglow	Arrival of Everglow	Lyricist
2019	"Going Home"	Jeong Se-woon	Plus Minus Zero	Co-arranger
2019	"I'm Home" (그래)	Minho	SM Station: Season 3	Co-arranger
2019	"Birthday"	Jeon Somi	XOXO	Co-lyricist
2020	"Cloud 9"	Cravity	Season 1. Hideout: Remember Who We Are	Co-lyricist, Co-composer
2020	"Flame"	Cravity	Season 2. Hideout: The New Day We Step Into	Co-lyricist
2020	"Fantasia"	Monsta X	Fantasia X	Co-lyricist
2020	"It Ain't Over"	Monsta X	Fantasia X	Co-lyricist, Co-composer
2020	"Love Killa"	Monsta X	Fatal Love	Co-composer
2021	"Blue"	Wonho	Blue Letter	Co-lyricist
2021	"Flash"	Wonho	Love Synonym Pt.2: Right for Us	Co-lyricist, Co-composer, Arranger
2021	"Don't Cry, My Love"	Cha Eun-woo	Under the Oak Tree OST	Co-lyricist
2021	"Easy"	WJSN The Black	My Attitude	Co-lyricist
2021	"Kiss or Death"	Monsta X	Non-album single	Co-composer
2021	"Rush Hour"	Monsta X	No Limit	Co-lyricist, Co-composer
2022	"Softly"	Miyeon	My	Lyricist
2022	", (Comma)"	Kihyun	Voyager	Co-lyricist
2022	"Adrenaline"	Cravity	Liberty: In Our Cosmos	Co-lyricist
2022	"Party Rock"	Cravity	New Wave	Co-lyricist
2022	"Automatic"	Cravity	New Wave	Co-lyricist, Co-composer
2022	"Cause Of You"	Kihyun	Youth	Co-lyricist, Co-composer, Arranging
2022	"Eye on You"	Wonho	Obsession	Co-lyricist
2022	"Crazy"	Wonho	Facade	Co-lyricist
2022	"Don't Regret"	Wonho	Bittersweet	Co-lyricist
2022	"Love"	Monsta X	Shape of Love	Co-lyricist, Co-composer
2022	"Paradise"	LimeLight	Limelight	Co-lyricist, Co-composer
2023	"Beautiful Liar"	Monsta X	Reason	Co-lyricist
2023	"Slow Dance"	Shownu X Hyungwon	The Unseen	Lyricist
2023	"Break It Down"	Choi Yoo-jung	Cold Blood Intern OST Part 1	Co-lyricist
2023	"Deal"	Choi Young-jae	Do It	Co-lyricist, Co-composer
2023	"Fluffy"	Choi Young-jae	Do It	Co-lyricist, Co-composer, Arranger
2023	"Snooze"	Choi Young-jae	Do It	Lyricist
2024	"No Girl"	Seola	Inside Out	Co-lyricist, Co-composer, Arranger
2024	"Plot Twist"	TWS	Sparking Blue	Co-lyricist, Co-composer
