= Liberty: In Our Cosmos =

Studio album by Cravity
- Released: March 22, 2022
- Genre: K-pop
- Length: 23:30
- Language: Korean
- Label: Starship

Cravity chronology
The Awakening: Written in the Stars (2021)	Liberty: In Our Cosmos (2022)	New Wave (2022)

Singles from Liberty: In Our Cosmos
- 1. "Adrenaline" Released: March 22, 2022

Liberty: In Our Cosmos (alternatively titled Cravity 1st Album Part 2 [Liberty: In Our Cosmos]) is the second studio album by South Korean boy band Cravity. It was released on March 22, 2022, by Starship Entertainment and distributed by Kakao Entertainment.

The album was a commercial success, debuting and peaking at number one on the South Korean Gaon Album Chart.

== Singles ==
"Adrenaline" is the lead single from the album. The song entered and peaked at number 7 on the Gaon Download Chart on the chart issue dated week of March 20–26, 2022. The song is Cravity's first lead single to chart in the top ten of the Gaon Download Chart.

== Promotions ==
The group's promotions for the song "Adrenaline" began on Mnet's M Countdown on March 24, 2022. The promotion continued on KBS2's Music Bank on March 25, MBC's Music Core on March 26, and SBS Inkigayo on March 27, capping off the first week of promotions.

== Track listing ==
Liberty: In Our Cosmos track listing
No.	Title	Lyrics	Music	Arrangement	Length
1.	"Adrenaline"	Hwang Yu-bin; Kim Hye-jin; Brother Su; Serim; Allen	Stereo14; Christoffer Semelius; H. Kenneth	Stereo14	3:14
2.	"Pow!"	Hwang; Serim; Allen	Stereo14; Woong Kim; Albin Nordqvist	Stereo14; Woong Kim	2:51
3.	"Boppin'"	PCDC	PCDC	PCDC	3:36
4.	"Chandelier"	Exy	Harold Philippon; Emily Yeonseo Kim; Alexander Karlsson	Alawn	3:01
5.	"Flip the Frame"	PCDC	PCDC	PCDC	3:22
6.	"Maybe Baby" (좋아하나봐)	PCDC	PCDC	PCDC	2:50
7.	"Late Night"	Junji; 1Hz	1Hz; Junji	1Hz; Junji	3:09
8.	"Outro: In Our Cosmos"	Junji; Serim; Allen	Shin Ki-hyun; 1Hz; Junji	Shin Ki-hyun; 1Hz	1:27
Total length:					23:30

== Charts ==
=== Weekly charts ===
Weekly chart performance for Liberty: In Our Cosmos
Chart (2022)	Peak position
Japanese Albums (Oricon)	31
South Korean Albums (Gaon)	1

=== Monthly charts ===
Monthly chart performance for Liberty: In Our Cosmos
Chart (2022)	Peak position
South Korean Albums (Gaon)	9

=== Year-end charts ===
Year-end chart performance for Liberty: In Our Cosmos
Chart (2022)	Position
South Korean Albums (Circle)	95

== Release history ==
Release history for Liberty: In Our Cosmos
Country	Date	Format	Label
South Korea	March 22, 2022	Digital download; CD	Starship; Kakao

== See also ==
- List of Gaon Album Chart number ones of 2022
