= Lovey (singer) =

South Korean singer-songwriter

- Born: Kim Hye-soo; June 27, 1993 (age 32)
- Origin: Seoul, South Korea
- Genres: R&B; urban
- Occupations: Singer; songwriter
- Years active: 2013–2022
- Label: RealCollabo (2013–2015)
- Formerly of: CSVC

Korean name
- Hangul: 김혜수
- RR: Gim Hyesu
- MR: Kim Hyesu

Kim Hye-soo (Korean: 김혜수; born June 27, 1993), better known as Lovey (러비), is a South Korean singer-songwriter. She debuted in 2013. She has an elder brother who is also a singer-songwriter, Brother Su.

== Career ==
=== RealCollabo days (2011–2015) ===
During her RealCollabo days, Lovey was more known for her featuring works. Prior to her debut, in 2011 she was featured in Alex's "Tomboi". The next year, she was featured in Andup's "방 안에서 (In Room)", Giriboy's "선수 (Player)", and Crucial Star's "Flat Shoes".

On August 1, 2013 she released her first single "돌려줘 (Return)" which was composed by Brother Su. In the same year, she did featuring for Swings' "엄지 두 개 (Two Thumbs)" and "My Way", Brother Su's "다른 별 (Different Star)", and Kebee's "아이같니 (Like Kid)".

In 2014, Lovey was featured again in Swings' "주요 우울증 (Major Depression)", Crucial Star's "Pretty Girl", and Giriboy's "쌩얼 (Bare Face)".

In 2015, she was featured in Brother Su's "점 (Dot)". This is her last work under RealCollabo, which became defunct on October that year.

=== Self producing (2016–present) ===
After RealCollabo's defunct, Lovey doesn't sign with other agencies. She continues releasing music with help of Starship Entertainment, where Brother Su is currently signed under. Lovey's second single "Not Enough" was released under Starship Entertainment on March 31.

On April 28, Starship released a video of Lovey and Cosmic Girls' Exy covering iKON's "My Type".

Lovey released her first extended play 24 on June 30.

== Discography ==
=== Extended plays ===
Title	Album details
24	Released: June 30, 2016; Label: Self-released
25	Released: May 26, 2017; Label: Self-released
27	Released: August 27, 2019; Label: Self-released
:)	Released: December 27, 2021; Label: Self-released

=== Singles ===
Album title	Year	Album
"Return" (돌려줘)	2013	24
"Not Enough" (부족해)	2016	24
"Campus Romance" (캠퍼스 로망스) (feat. Giriboy)	2016	24
"Timing" (타이밍) (feat. Yoo Seung-woo)	2017	25
"How Do I Say" (feat. Ko Young-bae of Soran)	2019	27
"If We Have Four Seasons" (우리에게도 사계가 존재한다면)	2021	Non-album single
"Hurry" (우린 서둘러) (feat. Youngjae of Got7)	2021	:)

== Songwriting ==
Songwriting credits are adapted from the Korea Music Copyright Association's online database. Lovey's ID number in the database is 10011978.

Year	Title	Artist	Album	Role
2016	"Not Enough" (부족해)	Lovey	Non-album single	Lyricist, composer
2016	"Come Slowly" (천천히 나와요)	Lovey	24	Lyricist, composer
2016	"Luggage" (짐)	Lovey	24	Lyricist, composer
2016	"Campus Romance" (캠퍼스 로망스) (feat. Giriboy)	Lovey	24	Co-lyricist, composer
2016	"Le Grand Bleu" (feat. Lovey)	Wilcox	Le Grand Bleu	Co-lyricist
2017	"Warak" (와락) (feat. Lil Boi)	Lovey	25	Co-lyricist, co-composer
2017	"Timing" (타이밍) (feat. Yoo Seung-woo)	Lovey	25	Co-lyricist, co-composer
2017	"12:30" (12시30분)	Lovey	25	Co-lyricist, co-composer
2017	"Just U"	Jeong Se-woon	Ever	Co-lyricist
2018	"Irony"	Jeong Se-woon	After	Co-lyricist
2018	"Eye 2 Eye"	Jeong Se-woon	Another	Co-lyricist
2019	"Sugar Pop"	WJSN	For the Summer	Co-lyricist
2019	"Summer Love"	CSVC	Non-album single	Co-lyricist, co-composer
2019	"Every Single Day"(꼬박꼬박)	Lovey	27	Co-lyricist, co-composer
2019	"How Do I Say" (feat. Ko Young-bae of Soran)	Lovey	27	Co-lyricist, co-composer
2019	"Perfume" (향수) (feat. Crucial Star)	Lovey	27	Co-lyricist, co-composer
2019	"The Night" (그밤)	Lovey	27	Co-lyricist, co-composer
2019	"Just 4 U..."	CSVC	Non-album singles	Co-lyricist, co-composer
2020	"No Mercy" (무자비)	CSVC	Non-album singles	Co-lyricist, co-composer
2021	"In The Dark"	Jeong Se-woon	24 Part. 2	Co-lyricist
2021	"If We Have Four Seasons" (우리에게도 사계가 존재한다면)	Lovey	Non-album single	Co-lyricist, co-composer
2021	"Kiss Your Lips"	WJSN The Black	My Attitude	Co-lyricist
2021	"Ding Dong" (딩동) (feat. Lovey)	OLNL	R-Rated	Co-lyricist, co-composer
2021	"Shutter" (셔터)	Lovey	:)	Lyricist
2021	"Wave"	Lovey	:)	Lyricist
2021	"Dream's Address" (꿈의번지)	Lovey	:)	Lyricist
2021	"Hurry" (우린 서둘러) (feat. Youngjae of Got7)	Lovey	:)	Co-lyricist
2022	"Drive Me to the Moon"	Got7	Got7	Co-lyricist
2022	"Rum Pum Pum"	Viviz	Non-album single	Co-lyricist
