= Season 3. Hideout: Be Our Voice =

- Digital cover

EP by Cravity
- Released: January 19, 2021
- Recorded: 2021
- Length: 24:25
- Language: Korean
- Label: Starship; Kakao M

Cravity chronology
Season 2. Hideout: The New Day We Step Into (2020)	Season 3. Hideout: Be Our Voice (2021)	The Awakening: Written in the Stars (2021)

Singles from Season 3. Hideout: Be Our Voice
- 1. "My Turn" Released: January 19, 2021; 2. "Bad Habits" Released: March 11, 2021

Season 3. Hideout: Be Our Voice is the third extended play by South Korean boy group Cravity. It was released on January 19, 2021, by Starship Entertainment and distributed by Kakao M.

The EP was a commercial success, peaking at number three on the weekly Gaon Album Chart and at number 12 on the Oricon weekly album chart. It is their first album to miss the top spot on the former chart, and their second best charting album on the latter.

== Singles ==
"My Turn" is the title track of the EP. The song entered and peaked at number 21 on the Gaon Download Chart on the chart issue dated week of January 17–23, 2021 and fell at number 82 on the following week of January 24–30, 2021.

The song became their first top-40 hit on the chart, and also their longest charting song as well as their first entry on the monthly update of the chart when it peaked at number 112.

== Promotion ==
Music show promotions for "My Turn" began on January 22, 2021, on KBS's Music Bank. The B-side track "Mammoth" was also performed during the first week of promotions.

A performance video for their B-side track "Bad Habits" was released on March 11, 2021, with promotions beginning the following day on March 12 on KBS's Music Bank as a follow-up to the group's initial promotions for the album.

== Commercial performance ==
Season 3. Hideout: Be Our Voice entered and peaked at number 3 on the Gaon Album Chart on the chart issue dated week of January 17–23, 2021. In its second week, the EP fell on #5 and was ranked #14 on its third week.

The EP shipped 112,301 copies at the end of January, charting at #5 on the Gaon Monthly Album Chart and was ranked #30 on the month of February with 17,970 copies shipped accounting to a total of 130,271 copies sold. On its third monthly update on Gaon, the EP rose 14 spots and was ranked #16 with 31,865 copies shipped accumulating to a total of 162,136 total copies sold for the EP.

== Track listing ==
Credits adapted from Melon.

Season 3. Hideout: Be Our Voice track listing
No.	Title	Lyrics	Music	Arrangement	Length
1.	"My Turn"	Exy	Cameron Jai; Harold Philippon; Keelah Jacobsen; Ryan S. Jhun	Alawn	3:33
2.	"Call My Name"	Moon Kim (153/Joombas); Chai Lin (153/Joombas); Serim; Allen	Moon Kim (153/Joombas); Jung Yoon (153/Joombas)	Jung Yoon (153/Joombas)	3:48
3.	"Mammoth"	danke (lalala studio); Serim; Allen	Daniel Kim; Scott Stoddart; Ryan S. Jhun	Scott Stoddart; Ryan S. Jhun	3:05
4.	"Bad Habits"	Exy	Dennis DeKo Kordnejad; Hanif Hitmanic Sabzevari; Johan Ahlmark; Ryan S. Jhun	DeKo; Hitmanic; Ryan S. Jhun	3:35
5.	"Moonlight"	JQ; Mola (makeumine works); Bae Seong-hyun (makeumine works); Serim; Allen	STEREO14; 1Hz; Peter St James; Albin Nordqvist	STEREO14; 1Hz	3:14
6.	"Dangerous"	JQ; Kim Eung-ju (makeumine works)	Goo Ji-eun; Niko Kyler; Tim Hawes; Joe Lawrence	Joe Lawrence	3:38
7.	"Give Me Your Love"	Jooyoung; Allen; Wonjin	$UN; Jooyoung; Bae Min-soo	$UN; Bae Min-soo	3:28
Total length:					24:25

== Charts ==
=== Weekly charts ===
Chart performance for Season 3. Hideout: Be Our Voice
Chart (2021)	Peak position
Japanese Albums (Oricon)	12
South Korean Albums (Gaon)	3

=== Year-end charts ===
Year-end chart performance for Season 3. Hideout: Be Our Voice
Chart (2021)	Position
South Korean Albums (Gaon)	65

== Release history ==
Release history of Season 3. Hideout: Be Our Voice
Country	Date	Format	Label
South Korea	January 19, 2021	Digital download; streaming	Starship Entertainment; Kakao M
South Korea	January 19, 2021	CD	Starship Entertainment; Kakao M
