= The Awakening: Written in the Stars =

Studio album by Cravity
- Released: August 19, 2021
- Recorded: 2021
- Genre: K-pop
- Length: 24:54
- Language: Korean
- Label: Starship; Kakao

Cravity chronology
Season 3. Hideout: Be Our Voice (2021)	The Awakening: Written in the Stars (2021)	Liberty: In Our Cosmos (2022)

Singles from The Awakening: Written in the Stars
- 1. "Gas Pedal" Released: August 19, 2021

The Awakening: Written in the Stars (alternatively titled Cravity 1st Album Part 1 [The Awakening: Written In The Stars]) is the debut studio album by South Korean boy group Cravity. It was released on August 19, 2021, by Starship Entertainment and distributed by Kakao Entertainment.

The album was a commercial success, debuting and peaking at number three on the South Korean Gaon Album Chart. The album has shipped over 145,264 physical copies in South Korea as of August 2021.

== Singles ==
"Gas Pedal" is the title track of the studio album. The song entered and peaked at number 41 on the Gaon Download Chart on the chart issue dated week of August 15–21, 2021 and fell at number 82 on the following week of August 22–28, 2021.

The song became their second top-50 hit on the download chart, and also their second song to enter the monthly update of the chart when it peaked at 114th place.

== Promotion ==
Music show promotions for "Gas Pedal" began on August 20, 2021, on KBS's Music Bank. The B-side track "Veni Vidi Vici" was also performed during the first week of promotions.

== Critical reception ==
Professional ratings
Review scores
Source	Rating
NME	3/5 stars

== Commercial performance ==
The Awakening: Written in the Stars entered and peaked at number 3 on the Gaon Album Chart on the chart issue dated week of August 15–21, 2021. In its second week, the album fell on #9 and was ranked #51 on its third week.

The album shipped 141,588 copies at the end of August, charting at #8 on the Gaon Monthly Album Chart.

== Track listing ==
The Awakening: Written in the Stars track listing
No.	Title	Lyrics	Music	Arrangement	Length
1.	"Intro: New Horizon"		PCDC	PCDC	1:01
2.	"Gas Pedal"	PCDC; Samuel Ku; Eddiesupa; Serim; Allen	PCDC; Samuel Ku; Eddiesupa	PCDC	3:17
3.	"Veni Vidi Vici"	PCDC	PCDC	PCDC	3:30
4.	"Chinga-Linga"	PCDC	PCDC	PCDC	3:52
5.	"Celebrate"	PCDC	PCDC	PCDC	3:24
6.	"Grand Prix"	Hwa Im-hyun (Flying Lab); Serim; Allen	Gabriel Brandes; Chris Meyer; Ludwig Lindell	Ludwig Lindell	3:17
7.	"Divin'"	Shin Ki-hyun; Junji	Shin Ki-hyun; Junji	Shin Ki-hyun; Junji	3:09
8.	"Go Go"	PCDC	PCDC	PCDC	3:24
Total length:					24:54

== Charts ==
=== Weekly charts ===
Weekly chart performance for The Awakening: Written in the Stars
Chart (2021)	Peak position
Japanese Albums (Oricon)	11
South Korean Albums (Gaon)	3

=== Year-end charts ===
Year-end chart performance for The Awakening: Written in the Stars
Chart (2021)	Position
South Korean Albums (Gaon)	61

== Release history ==
Release history of The Awakening: Written in the Stars
Country	Date	Format	Label
South Korea	August 19, 2021	Digital download; streaming	Starship; Kakao
South Korea	August 19, 2021	CD	Starship; Kakao
