= New Wave (EP) =

- Digital cover

EP by Cravity
- Released: September 27, 2022
- Genre: K-pop
- Length: 19:18
- Language: Korean
- Label: Starship

Cravity chronology
Liberty: In Our Cosmos (2022)	New Wave (2022)	Master: Piece (2023)

Singles from New Wave
- 1. "Boogie Woogie" Released: August 12, 2022; 2. "Party Rock" Released: September 27, 2022

New Wave is the fourth extended play by South Korean boy band Cravity. It was released on September 27, 2022, by Starship Entertainment and distributed by Kakao Entertainment. It was released alongside the music video for lead single "Party Rock".

The album debuted at number one on the South Korean Circle Album Chart with sales of over 183,000 copies.

== Background ==
The EP includes four songs co-written by members Serim and Allen, including "Automatic" and "Colorful", as well as the band's first English-language song, "Boogie Woogie", and the first song self-produced by Woobin, "Colorful".

== Promotion ==
On September 27, Cravity began the EP's promotion with a performance at the Yes24 Live Hall in the Gwangjin District of eastern Seoul, where they also interacted with fans and discussed the EP's creation.

The group's promotions for the song "Party Rock" on music show programs began on Mnet's M Countdown on September 29, 2022. The promotion continued on KBS2's Music Bank on September 30, MBC M's Show! Music Core on October 1, and SBS Inkigayo on October 2, capping off the first week of promotions.

== Track listing ==
New Wave track listing
No.	Title	Lyrics	Music	Length
1.	"Boogie Woogie"	Jonas Jurstrom, Victor Thell, CRAVITY	Jonas Jurstrom, Victor Thell, CRAVITY	3:10
2.	"Party Rock"	Yubin Hwang, Brother Su, Serim, Allen	OLLIPOP, Gabriel Brandes, Realmeee	3:04
3.	"New Addiction"	Anna Kim (PNP), Serim, Allen	Harold Philippon, Kyler Niko, Andy Love	2:50
4.	"Automatic"	Brother Su, Serim, Allen	Brother Su, Ludwig Lindell, Johan Gustafsson	3:18
5.	"Colorful"	Woobin, Serim, Allen	Woobin, Saimon	3:41
6.	"Knock Knock"	The Name, Junji	129, Junji, Hangil	3:15
Total length:				19:18

== Charts ==
=== Weekly charts ===
Weekly chart performance for New Wave
Chart (2022)	Peak position
Japanese Albums (Oricon)	11
South Korean Albums (Circle)	1

=== Monthly charts ===
Monthly chart performance for New Wave
Chart (2022)	Peak position
Japanese Albums (Oricon)	36
South Korean Albums (Circle)	6

=== Year-end charts ===
Year-end chart performance for New Wave
Chart (2022)	Position
South Korean Albums (Circle)	64
