= Season 1. Hideout: Remember Who We Are =

EP by Cravity
- Released: April 14, 2020
- Recorded: 2020
- Genre: K-pop
- Length: 24:03
- Language: Korean
- Label: Starship; kakao M

Cravity chronology
Season 1. Hideout: Remember Who We Are (2020)	Season 2. Hideout: The New Day We Step Into (2020)

Singles from Season 1. Hideout: Remember Who We Are
- 1. "Break All the Rules" Released: April 14, 2020; 2. "Cloud 9" Released: June 17, 2020

Season 1. Hideout: Remember Who We Are is the debut extended play by South Korean boy group Cravity. It was released on April 14, 2020, by Starship Entertainment and distributed by Kakao M.

The EP was a commercial success, debuting and peaking at number one on the South Korean Gaon Album Chart. The EP has shipped over 153,525 physical copies in South Korea as of July 2020.

== Background and release ==
Monsta X Joohoney also participated through the lyrics and composition of "Jumper". The song was revealed to be presented by Joohoney to the group in order to cheer them on for their debut as well as part of his full support for his junior labelmates.

== Singles ==
"Break All the Rules" is the album's title track. The song entered and peaked at number 67 on the Gaon Download Chart on the chart issue dated April 12–18, 2020.

A music video for "Cloud 9" was released on June 17, 2020.

== Promotion ==
The group's promotions for the song "Break All the Rules" began on April 16, 2020, on Mnet's M Countdown. The B-side track "Jumper" was also performed during the group's first week of promotions. The B-side track "Stay" was performed on May 12, 2020 on The Show, while follow-up promotions for the B-side "Cloud 9" began on June 18, 2020.

== Commercial performance ==
Season 1. Hideout: Remember Who We Are entered and peaked at number 1 on the Gaon Album Chart on the chart issue dated April 12–18, 2020. In its second week, the EP fell to number 4 and maintained its position on its third week.

The EP shipped 104,343 physical copies in its first month, charting at number 6 on the Gaon Album Chart for the month of April 2020.

== Track listing ==
Season 1. Hideout: Remember Who We Are
No.	Title	Lyrics	Music	Arrangement	Length
1.	"Top of the Chain"	JQ; Kim Eung-ju; Park Ji-won	Kim Chang Rak; Chris Wahle; Didrik Thott	Wahle	3:21
2.	"Break all the Rules"	Seo Ji-eum; Wutan	Gionata Caracciolo; Val Del Prete; Sean Michael Alexander; Drew Ryan Scott; Willie Weeks	Caracciolo; Willie Weeks	3:28
3.	"Jumper"	Joohoney; 9F	Joohoney; 9F	Joohoney; 9F	3:12
4.	"Blackout"	danke (lalala studio); Mok Ji-min; Wutan	Naitumela Masaku	Jungleboi	3:20
5.	"Stay" (Korean: 낯섦; RR: Natseolm; lit. Strangeness)	Lee Seu-ran	Daniel Kim; Jeremy G (Future Sound); Al Sweettenham	Geek Boy	3:30
6.	"Cloud 9"	Brother Su	Sebastian Thott; Su	Sebastian Thott	3:21
7.	"Star" (Korean: 별; RR: Byeol)	War of Stars (Galactika *)	War of Stars (Galactika *); Athena (Galactika *)	Team Galactika	3:49
Total length:					24:01

== Chart performance ==
=== Album chart ===
Chart	Peak position
Gaon Weekly album chart	1
Gaon Monthly album chart	6

=== Digital chart ===
Chart	Title	Peak position
Gaon Weekly download chart	Break all the Rules	67

== Release history ==
Country	Date	Format	Label
South Korea	April 14, 2020	Digital download	Starship Entertainment kakao M
South Korea	April 14, 2020	CD	Starship Entertainment kakao M

== See also ==
- List of Gaon Album Chart number ones of 2020
