= Season 2. Hideout: The New Day We Step Into =

EP by Cravity
- Released: August 24, 2020
- Recorded: 2020
- Genre: K-pop
- Length: 23:49
- Language: Korean
- Labels: Starship; kakao M

Cravity chronology
Season 1. Hideout: Remember Who We Are (2020)	Season 2. Hideout: The New Day We Step Into (2020)	Season 3. Hideout: Be Our Voice (2021)

Singles from Season 2. Hideout: The New Day We Step Into
- 1. "Flame" Released: August 24, 2020; 2. "Ohh Ahh" Released: October 21, 2020

Season 2. Hideout: The New Day We Step Into is the second extended play by South Korean boy group Cravity. It was released on August 24, 2020, by Starship Entertainment and distributed by kakao M.

The EP was a commercial success, debuting and peaking at number one on the South Korean Gaon Album Chart and at number 15 on the Oricon Albums Chart. This is their second album to top the former chart, while the album is also their lowest charting album on the latter. It has also charted at number 41 on the Billboard Japan Download Albums chart.

== Singles ==
"Flame" is the title track of the album. The song entered at number 81 on the Gaon Download Chart on the chart issue dated August 23–29, 2020. The song won them their first-ever music show award on SBS MTV's The Show on September 1, 2020.

== Promotion ==
The group's promotions for the song "Flame" began on August 28, 2020, on KBS's Music Bank. Follow-up promotions for their B-side track "Ohh Ahh" began on October 22, 2020 on Mnet's M Countdown.

== Commercial performance ==
Season 2. Hideout: The New Day We Step Into entered and peaked at number 1 on the Gaon Album Chart on the chart issue dated August 23–29, 2020. In its second week, the EP fell to number 10 and rose to number 9 on its third week.

The EP shipped 131,507 copies on the month of August, charting at number 5 on the monthly Gaon Album Chart.

The album has topped the Japanese Tower Records' album chart on the chart issue dated August 24–30, 2020 and also ranked first on 7 regions on iTunes album chart, top 3 in 12 regions and fourth over-all on the iTunes album chart.

== Track listing ==
Credits adapted from Naver.

Season 2. Hideout: The New Day We Step Into track listing
No.	Title	Lyrics	Music	Arrangement	Length
1.	"Flame"	JQ; Da0; BrotherSu	Jisoo Park (153/Joombas); Jeff Lewis; Blair Taylor	Blair Taylor	3:14
2.	"Believer"	JQ; Moon Seoul; Park Ji-won (makeumine works); Serim; Allen	David Amber; Andy Love	David Amber	3:33
3.	"Ohh Ahh"	Chai Lin (153/Joombas)	Joony (153/Joombas); Andy Love; Pablo Groove (153/Joombas)	Joony (153/Joombas); Pablo Groove (153/Joombas)	3:25
4.	"Realize"	Lee Seuran; Serim; Allen	Daniel Kim; Jeremy G (Future Sound); Al Swettenham	Geek Boy	3:35
5.	"Hot Air Balloon" (Korean: 열기구; RR: Yeolgigu)	BrotherSu	Willie Weeks; BrotherSu	Willie Weeks	3:07
6.	"Sunrise"	The Name; Min Yeon-jae; Woo Sung-jun	The Name; Shin Ki-hyun; Woo Sung-jun	Shin Ki-hyun	3:17
7.	"Breathing" (Korean: 호흡; RR: Hoheup)	KZ; Tae Bongee; HOFF	KZ; Tae Bongee; HOFF	KZ; Tae Bongee	3:38
Total length:					23:49

== Charts ==
Chart performance of Season 2. Hideout: The New Day We Step Into
Chart (2020)	Peak position
Japanese Albums (Oricon)	15
South Korean Albums (Gaon)	1

== Accolades ==
Song	Program	Date	Ref.
Flame	"The Show" (SBS MTV)	September 1, 2020	

== Release history ==
Release history of Season 2. Hideout: The New Day We Step Into
Country	Date	Format	Label
South Korea	August 24, 2020	Digital download; streaming	Starship Entertainment; kakao M
South Korea	August 24, 2020	CD	Starship Entertainment; kakao M

== See also ==
- List of Gaon Album Chart number ones of 2020
