= Cravity =

South Korean boy band

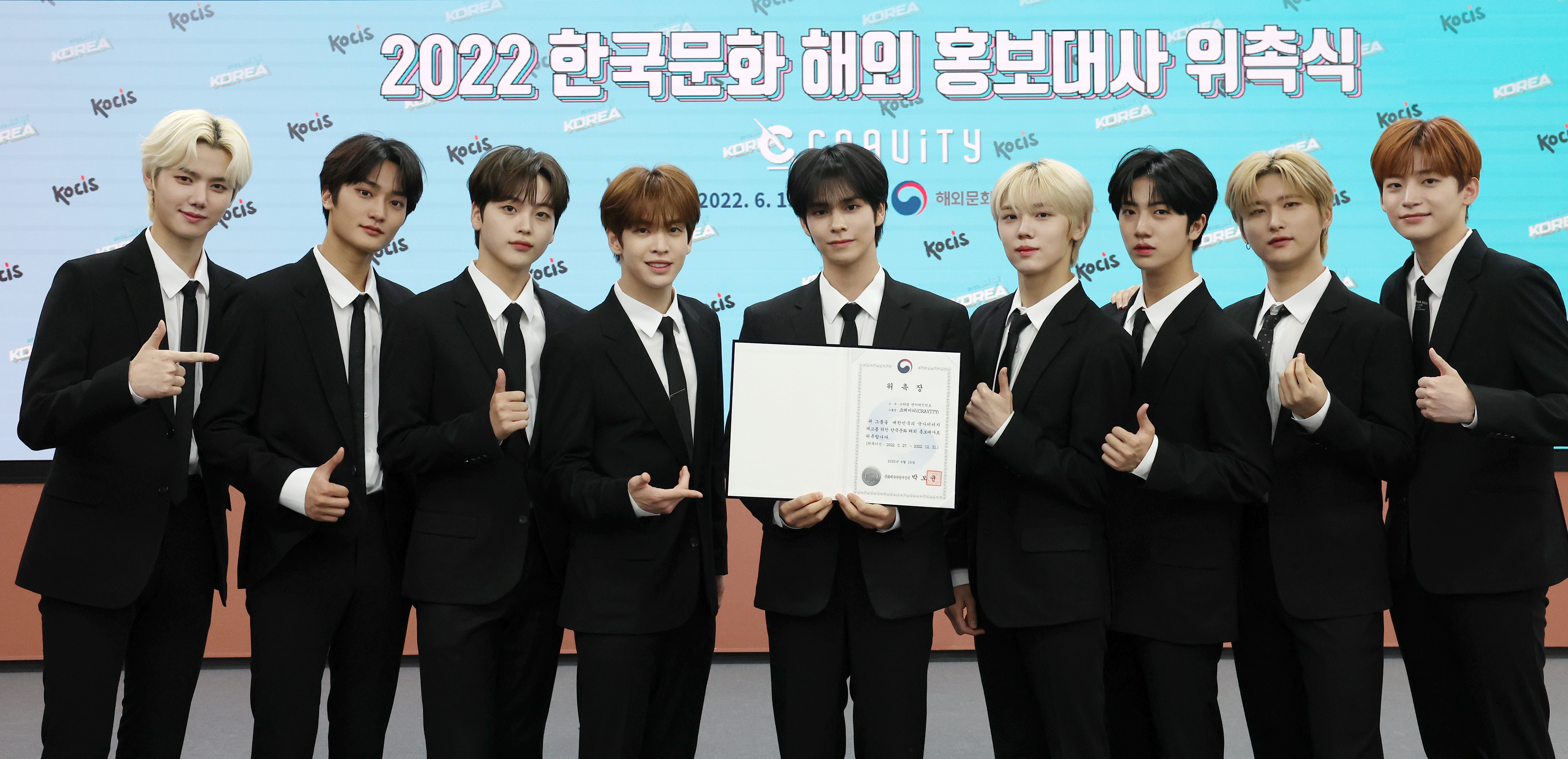
- Cravity in June 2022; From left to right: Minhee, Taeyoung, Hyeongjun, Allen, Serim, Seongmin, Wonjin, Woobin, and Jungmo

Background information
- Origin: Seoul, South Korea
- Genres: K-pop; hip hop; dance-pop
- Years active: 2020–present
- Labels: Starship; Victor
- Members: Serim; Allen; Jungmo; Woobin; Wonjin; Minhee; Hyeongjun; Taeyoung; Seongmin
- Website: cravity-official.com

Cravity (Korean: 크래비티) is a South Korean boy band under Starship Entertainment. The group is composed of nine members: Serim, Allen, Jungmo, Woobin, Wonjin, Minhee, Hyeongjun, Taeyoung, and Seongmin. They debuted on April 14, 2020, with their extended play, Season 1. Hideout: Remember Who We Are.

The group was dubbed "Monster Rookies" in 2020, and described as "global artist[s] that attract the attention of fans globally." In 2020, they were the first rookie artist to debut on the Billboard K-pop Hot 100, and they earned numerous awards at end-of-year award shows including: "New Artist of the Year" at the 12th Melon Music Awards, "Best of Next" at the 2020 Mnet Asian Music Awards, and "Rookie Award" in the 4th Soribada Awards.

In November 2024, the group placed first on the Mnet reality competition survival show Road to Kingdom: Ace of Ace.

== History ==
=== Pre-debut ===
In 2019, Jungmo, Wonjin, Minhee, and Hyeongjun participated in the k-pop reality show Produce X 101, representing Starship Entertainment (along with former Starship trainee Moon Hyunbin). In the show's finale, Jungmo and Wonjin placed at ranks 12 and 19 respectively, narrowly missing the show's debut-lineup. However, Hyeongjun placed 4th and Minhee placed 10th, and made it into the debut line-up of the group X1. Hyeongjun and Minhee debuted with X1 on August 27, 2019, and participated in promotions until the groups disbandment on January 6, 2020.

In March 2020, Starship began unveiling the debut-lineup for the agency's nine-member boy group. That same month the group name "Cravity" was revealed, and explained as an amalgamation of the words "Creativity" and "Gravity" which implies the boys will bring you into their universe with their unique charms. Additionally, Cravity also stands for "Center of Gravity", and encompasses the group's ambition to achieve the best performance and stage presence when all members gather together in perfect balance. It was also announced that Cravity would make their debut on April 14, 2020.

=== 2020: Debut with Season 1. Hideout: Remember Who We Are and Season 2. Hideout: The New Day We Step Into ===
Cravity debuted with the extended play Season 1. Hideout: Remember Who We Are on April 14, 2020, which peaked atop of Gaon's Album Chart. On the day of the album release, Cravity held their first ever showcase through Naver V Live, which reached 1 million viewers. The music video for the album's lead single "Break All the Rules" surpassed 10 million views on Youtube within six days of its release. The song place in the top 100 in seven regions on iTunes (including the US and Japan), and the album placed in the top three most listened to albums in 12 regions, peaking at number four on the Worldwide iTunes Albums Chart. Physical album sales were reported at over 100,000 copies within the month of April 2020.

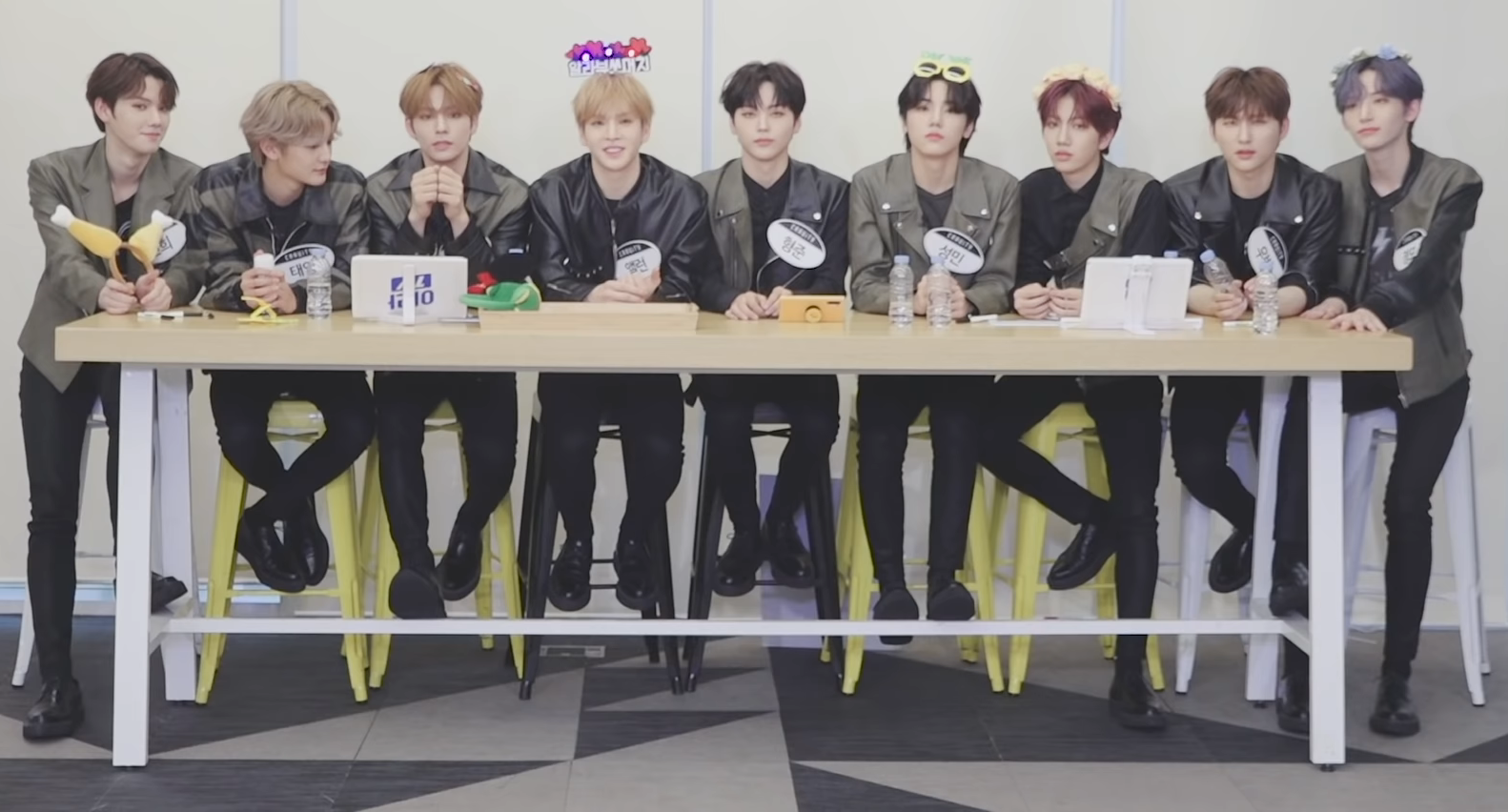
Cravity in May 2020

On April 29, Cravity appeared on a live broadcast through Naver entitled 'Cravity X LieV", reminiscing about their precious times with global fans, to which they recorded 370,000 live viewers despite the late hour of the broadcast. Cravity entered and peaked on the Billboard Social 50 Chart at number 12. They are the fifth fastest South Korean group to enter Social 50, as well as being the only South Korean rookie artist to chart on Billboard's Social 50 in 2020 at the time of their debut. On June 17, Cravity released a music video for their song "Cloud 9", a track previously included in their debut extended play. They subsequently began music show promotions for this song.

On August 5, Cravity announced they would be making their first comeback with their second extended play Season 2. Hideout: The New Day We Step Into on August 24, 2020, with the title track "Flame". This album will feature lyrics written by members Serim and Allen. On August 13, at the 2020 Soribada Best K-Music Awards, Cravity won the "New Artist Award", their first award since debut. On August 24, Cravity released their second album, Season 2. Hideout: The New Day We Step Into. The EP contains seven tracks, including the lead single "Flame". The album has topped the Japanese Tower Records' album chart and ranked first on seven regions on iTunes.

On September 1, Cravity had their first music show win on SBS MTV's The Show with "Flame" with the song also debuting at number 97 on the Billboard Korea K-pop Hot 100 chart on the chart issue dated week of September 26. On September 14, the group formally released their official light stick, which they called "Remembong".

Cravity on October 9 held an exclusive on-tact fan meeting 'Cravity Collection: C-Express' through Naver V Live wherein they greeted their fans in 126 regions. The fanmeeting was organized with a theme of an "amusement park" as a way of the group to greet their fans brightly. On October 21, Cravity released a performance video for their song "Ohh Ahh", a B-side track on Season 2. Hideout: The New Day We Step Into. They subsequently began music show promotions with the song.

=== 2021: Season 3. Hideout: Be Our Voice and The Awakening: Written in the Stars ===
On January 19, Cravity released the third installment of the Hideout series with their third extended play Season 3. Hideout: Be Our Voice, along with the music video of the lead single, "My Turn". The album features some of the songs written by members Serim, Allen and Wonjin. They subsequently began promoting their title track alongside their B-side track "Mammoth" on music shows. On January 25, Cravity appeared as a guest on the variety show "Super Junior's Idol vs. Idol", on KNTV. The members appeared in episodes 25–28 for a total of four episodes airing until the 28th of the month.

On March 2, it was announced that Cravity would release a performance video for their B-side track "Bad Habits" on March 11. They began promotions for the song on music shows following the video's release. On April 14, Cravity celebrated their first anniversary since their debut. The group held a V Live titled "Remember the four seasons we spent together" in commemoration of the event. In addition, the group released various behind-the-scenes contents to celebrate its first anniversary.

On April 15, Starship Entertainment reported that Cravity will be joining K-Pop entertainment platform Universe. In the video released through the Universe app and official social media that day, Cravity expressed that they would work hard and have fun filming contents that can only be seen in the platform. On June 6, Cravity held the Universe fan party 'Sunday Cravity' wherein they met fans around the world through online and offline.

On June 30, Cravity confirmed their upcoming comeback and is preparing for a new album on August. On July 26, Cravity started teasing the release of their first full-length album, The Awakening: Written in the Stars. It was confirmed that the album would be released on August 19.

On August 19, Cravity released the first part of their first studio album The Awakening: Written in the Stars, featuring the title track "Gas Pedal". They subsequently began promoting their title track alongside their B-side track "Veni Vidi Vici" on music shows. Within the first week after its release, over 100,000 copies were sold, making it the first of Cravity's works to have reached that milestone and the first to be eligible for Hanteo certification. On September 27, it was announced that Cravity would be releasing a special video for their B-side track "Veni Vidi Vici" on October 7. After its release, the group began a second round of promotions on music shows with the song.

On November 20–21, Cravity held the two-day fan meeting 'Cravity Collection: C-Delivery', marking their first performance in a year since their solo on:tact fan gathering in October 2020. On December 15, the group announce the launch of the soon to be released Cravity character dolls where each member personally participated in the design. The characters were first shown through the group's fan meeting 'Cravity Collection: C-Delivery' held in November.

=== 2022: Liberty: In Our Cosmos and New Wave ===
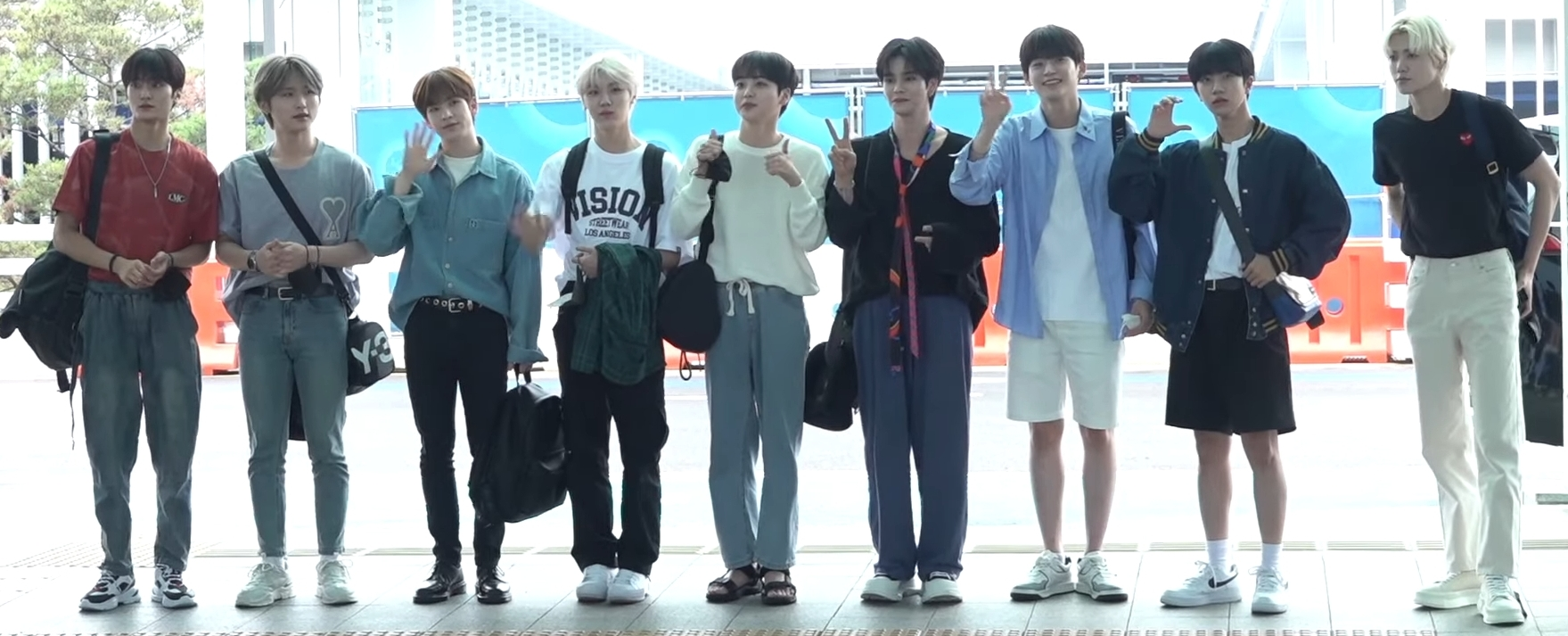
Cravity in 2022

On January 26, it was announced that Cravity would be making their comeback with the second part of their first studio album Liberty: In Our Cosmos, featuring the title track "Adrenaline" on February 22. On February 4, it was announced on social media that they had been chosen as special DJs for KBS Cool FM's "Station Z" radio show, with weekly appearances as units during February.

On February 12, it was announced that 7 of the 9 members had tested positive for COVID-19 (later updated to 8 of the 9 members on February 16 and all 9 on February 20) and as a result, their comeback was postponed. On February 28, it was announced that their comeback would be rescheduled for March 22. With the release of their new promotion schedule, they also announced that they would be holding their first set of solo concerts at Olympic Hall within Seoul's Olympic Park on April 2 and 3.

On March 22, Cravity released the second installment of their first studio album. The group started promoting their title track "Adrenaline" on Mnet's M Countdown. On March 30, Cravity released a choreography video for their song "Maybe Baby" from their second studio album. They subsequently began promotion of the song through SBS MTV The Show.

On April 2, the group was awarded the "Silver Creator" award by TikTok for surpassing 1 million followers on the platform. On the same day, they were announced as part of the lineup for the 'KCON 2022 Premiere' in Chicago, their first appearance at the annual music festival. On April 14, Cravity celebrated their second anniversary with a surprise gift for their fans. The group released a special clip for their track "Late Night" from their album Liberty: In Our Cosmos. The released video contains clips from Cravity's first solo concert since their debut, "Center of Gravity".

On May 31, Cravity released the promotional single "Vivid" through the Universe Music platform on the mobile application Universe. On June 30, Cravity successfully wrapped up their two-day sold-out concert entitled 'Cravity the 1st Fan–Con Center of Gravity' at Zepp Osaka Bayside in Japan.

On July 20, Cravity confirmed their participation in the 'KCON 2022 US TOUR', which was held until September. The group participated as a representative of the next generation of K-pop artists, starting with 'KCON 2022 LA', held on August 19 to 21, followed by KCON editions in San Francisco, Minneapolis, Houston, Dallas, Atlanta, wrapping up their participation with 'KCON 2022 New York City' on September 1.

On August 5, Cravity announced that they would be releasing their fourth mini-album New Wave in September. Ahead of the album's release, the group pre-released their first English digital single, "Boogie Woogie", on August 12. On September 27, Cravity released their fourth mini-album "New Wave", featuring the title track "Party Rock". On the same day, Cravity held a comeback show to commemorate the release of the album. The comeback show was broadcast live online through the global fandom platform Universe, and at the same time, they held a comeback show with fans face-to-face for the first time since their debut.

On October 4, Cravity received their first music show win for "Party Rock" and second music show win overall on SBS MTV's The Show. On October 19, Cravity held the Cravity, The 1st Fan-Con 'Center of Gravity' in Japan. The group met with 12,200 fans through multiple performances in Tokyo and Osaka in the span of four days. On the same week, Cravity announced an upcoming edition of their fan-con on November 27 in Taiwan.

On November 6, it was announced that members Serim, Minhee, Hyeongjun, Jungmo, and Seongmin would be participating in the filming of The Game Caterers X Starship Entertainment, representing Cravity. On November 23, Cravity released concept photos along with the news of the release of the 2023 Season's Greetings, "CRVT's Sweets".

On December 21, Cravity announced the holding of the "2023 Cravity Fan-Con, 'Dear My Luvity". The fan-con will be held at Blue Square Mastercard Hall in Seoul on February 18 at 6 p.m. and 19 at 5 p.m. next year. On February 19 (Sunday), it will also be held through the online live broadcast Beyond Live.

=== 2023: Master: Piece, World tour, Japanese debut, and Sun Seeker ===
On February 10, Cravity announced they would be releasing their 5th mini album, Master: Piece, featuring the title track "Groovy". On February 17, Cravity joined Dear U Co., Ltd., a domestic fan platform company that allows fans of the group to communicate with them, specifically on 'Bubble for Starship'.

On February 19, Cravity successfully wrapped up their two-day "2023 Dear My Luvity Fan-Con", which was held at the Blue Square Mastercard Hall in Seoul. On March 6, Cravity released Master: Piece, alongside the music video of the lead single "Groovy". They subsequently began promoting their title track on music shows. On March 8, the album received a positive spotlight from leading overseas media outlets, such as the American music media outlet Billboard and the British music magazine NME.

On March 14, Cravity received their first music show win for "Groovy" and third music show win overall on SBS MTV's The Show. On March 21, Cravity announced the kick-off of their first world tour entitled 2023 Cravity The 1st World Tour 'Masterpiece' in the Olympic Hall of Olympic Park in Seoul, South Korea. The first concerts in Seoul will span May 13 to 14.

On March 24, Cravity announced an upcoming exhibition and pop-up store commemorating the 3rd anniversary of their debut at The Hyundai Seoul B2 Pop Up Iconic, located on Yeongdeungpo-gu, Seoul, from March 30 to April 5. The exhibition and pop-up store were prepared in celebration of Cravity's 3rd anniversary on April 14 with the theme "Cravity 3rd Anniversary Exhibition & Pop-up Store "Remember Our Time".

On May 14, Cravity successfully wrapped up its first world tour in Seoul, held for two days starting from the 13th and the 14th, where it was also broadcast live through streaming platform Beyond Live. On May 16, Cravity announced that they would officially debut in Japan. The group aims to release their debut single "Groovy (Japanese ver.)" alongside the b-side track "I Can't Fight the Feeling" on July 5. On May 29, Cravity returned with the first episode of the seventh season of their reality show Cravity Park, with its first episode (the 77th episode) released on their official YouTube channel.

On May 23, Cravity unveils the tour list for their first world tour, 2023 Cravity The 1st World Tour 'Masterpiece', through social media. The tour released official stops in Taipei, Hong Kong, Manila, and Bangkok, along with two cities in Japan and six cities in the Americas. On June 1, Cravity released a special clip video of their song "Get Lifted" from their album Master:Piece through social media, embarking on the start of their world tour outside South Korea.

On July 20, Cravity opened a pop-up store "Summer Ccrew" for the official character 'Crew' at Pop Up Iconic, B2, The Hyundai Seoul, Yeongdeungpo-gu, Seoul. Crew is an official character that captures the charms of nine members of Cravity, with the members creating the characters with their own ideas and personalities, such as character design, characteristics, frequently spoken words, personality, favorite food, and additional worldview settings.

On August 6, Cravity released their first official soundtrack appearance as a group with the single "Ready Set Go", the theme OST for tvN's Amazing Rumor 2: Counter Punch. On the same day, the group also announced the release of their 6th mini album Sun Seeker on September 11, which will be the group's first to feature a double title track.

On September 19, Cravity's single "Ready or Not" from the sixth mini album Sun Seeker ranked first on the Billboard's Hot Trending Songs chart, proving their global presence with their new album. On October 12, Seongmin temporarily suspends activities with the group due to his mother's illness, prompting the activities of the group to be carried out with the 8-member line-up.

On November 11, Cravity released the music video for their song "Megaphone", a song included on their sixth mini album, Sun Seeker, continuing the promotion of activities for the album.

=== 2024–present: Evershine and Road to Kingdom ===
On February 1, Starship Entertainment announced that Cravity would release their seventh mini-album, Evershine, on February 26, five months after their last Korean album. One week after, the group was then announced as special DJs on MBC Radio's Idol Radio for two weeks, featuring a diverse lineup centered around member Jungmo.

In April, Cravity announced the start of their follow-up promotions for their album Evershine. After wrapping up activities for the lead single "Love or Die", the group began releasing concept photos and a music video teaser for the b-side track "C'est La Vie". Cravity successfully wrapped up their promotions for their album Evershine with a performance of their follow-up song "C'est La Vie" on SBS' Inkigayo. Notably, the album earned them their first terrestrial music show win with the lead single "Love or Die" on the first-week March episode of KBS' Music Bank. In the same month, Cravity captivated fans with their two-day fan concert "Luvity Games" at the Seoul Olympic Hall, where all tickets were sold out.

In May, Cravity announced that they would be releasing their second Japanese single, "Show Off", with a single album of the same name on June 5. Alongside the release, they held a two-day fan concert titled Love! Luv!! Luvity!!! "Show Off" in Japan on June 4 and 5. In the same month, the group continued to demonstrate their popularity by performing at ten different university festivals: Incheon National University on the 7th, Kyunghee University on the 18th, Yonsei University (Mirae Campus) and the University of Seoul on the 22nd, Chosun University on the 27th, Inje University and Pusan National University on the 28th, Hanyang University (Erica Campus) on the 29th, and Sungkyunkwan University and Sejong University on the 30th.

On July 10, Cravity was announced as an official participant of the reality competition show Road to Kingdom: Ace of Ace by Mnet.

In August, Cravity was featured in the Apple TV+ documentary series "Welcome to K-Pop: Idol Stories," which highlights the light and dark sides of the K-Pop industry that has grown explosively over the past 10 years. The documentary shared the group's story of struggling to succeed in the fierce competition, especially as they debuted during the COVID-19 pandemic.

On October, Cravity hosted a pop-up store of their official character Ccrew 'Autumn Ccrew' from October 24 to November 3 on the first basement floor of Lotte World Mall in Jamsil. Variety of events were held for customers visiting the store providing fans with different kinds of fun.

In January 2025, Cravity celebrated the 100th episode of their reality show series, Cravity Park.

On June 23, Cravity released their third studio album Dare to Crave, alongside the lead single "Set Net Go?!".

Cravity released their eight EP Redefine, alongside the lead single "Awake", on April 29, 2026. On September 30, the group released their ninth EP Sonorous, alongside the lead single "Louder".

== Other ventures ==
=== Ambassadorship ===
In the tourism sector, Cravity was appointed as tourism ambassadors for "K-pop Star Street" in Gwangju, the group participated in numerous activities that publicly promoted tourist destinations of the city for 2020-2021.

In June 2022, it was announced that Cravity was selected by the Ministry of Culture, Sports, and Tourism as an overseas ambassador for Korean culture.

=== Endorsements ===
In October 2020, Cravity was chosen as the model for the cosmetics brand Blackrouge. The group's passion, powerful energy, health and vitality as a new male idol group fit well with the lively image of Blackrouge leading to them being selected as the models of the cosmetics brand. The group promoted the brand not just in Korea, but also in China and other countries in Southeast Asia. The group and Blackrouge parted ways a year later in October 2021.

In August 2022, Cravity was unveiled to be the first official model of the American casual brand Searchit. The boy group designed a hand-drawn unique design collection for the brand's t-shirt to which all the products worn by the members were sold out.

In February 2023, Cravity was announced as the new ambassador of the cosmetics brand Make P:rem. Using skincare goods from the brand, such as cleansing, soothing pads, and sunscreen, Cravity made their debut as the brand's new face through a photoshoot with Singles Korea.

In May 2024, Cravity was selected by New Vitality as their fashion brand ambassador. Clothing and other items from the brand were inspired by Cravity through close collaboration with the brand's designers.

=== Philanthropy ===
In July 2022, Starship Entertainment, along with Cravity, join hands with the Blue Tree Foundation to prevent and eradicate cyberbullying among teenagers. Starship expects the participation of Cravity and its fellow artists to not only protect the artist's rights and interests but also become another fandom culture that will change society.

In February 2023, members Serim, Minhee, and Hyeongjun, along with actor Son Heon-soo, participated in KBS 1TV's My Hometown's new corner "New Start" as part of the celebration of the 50th anniversary of the network. The appearance of the members aims to provide household goods that will help elderly and financially struggling families in farming and fishing villages organize a better home to help them enhance their living conditions and quality of life.

== Artistry ==
=== Musical style ===
Cravity's music has been characterized as infectious, upbeat, and inventive. It can be described as a blend of K-pop, hip-hop, EDM, and pop, with catchy melodies and powerful vocal and rap performances. Their music often features energetic beats, strong vocal harmonies, and impactful rap verses, which are complemented by their synchronized dance routines and charismatic stage presence. Through the group's music, they tend to appeal to the audience through their lyrics full of confidence and assurance.

In an interview with NME, Allen mentioned that members of the group have been taking part in the writing process of their music. He mentioned the importance of them having a hand in their creative output to show their best sides and grow their bond with the audience. On the other end, Serim explained that writing their own lyrics allows the group and the audience to relate better to their song, which helps them build intimacy, as if they're directly communicating through their lyrics to the fans.

=== Concept, image, and lyrical themes ===
Cravity's concept as a group is centered around the vibrancy and passion of youth, with their music, performances, and visuals reflecting their drive to pursue their dreams. Their versatile musical style encompasses various genres, allowing them to showcase their individual talents while maintaining a cohesive identity. Known for their powerful, synchronized performances that combine intricate choreography with expressive stage presence, Cravity also tells stories through their albums, often following a storyline or theme that connects each release.

Cravity's music showcases a range of lyrical themes, reflecting the experiences of youth, personal growth, empowerment, and self-confidence. As they explore love, relationships, and the importance of friendship and unity, their songs emphasize the value of standing together and supporting one another. With a focus on storytelling and escapism, their "Hideout" series delves into the concept of finding a safe space in a chaotic world, emphasizing self-discovery and the search for solace.

=== Influences ===
Among their professional musical influences, Cravity has named boy groups Shinee, BTS, Monsta X, and NCT as well as international solo artist Lauv, as their inspirations. In terms of personal inspirations, members Serim and Jungmo mentioned BTS V, while Wonjin cited Jimin. Joohoney from Monsta X was cited by Allen, Hyeongjun, Minhee, and Minhee also mentioned Minhyuk, while Allen also mentioned Taemin from Shinee. On the other end, Seongmin identified Jaehyun of NCT, while Woobin shared Lauv as his own personal inspiration.

In an interview with Allure Magazine, the band revealed that their labelmate seniors Monsta X under Starship Entertainment were their biggest role model and influence in their careers when it came to styling and fashion.

In 2023, Cravity has expressed goals to become a group like Seventeen that writes and produces all the songs on the album, expressing their grand ambition to continue the lineage of "self-produced idols".

== Impact ==
In September 2020, South Korean news outlet Top Star News conducted a survey for the "Most Anticipated Team Among New Rookie Groups that Debuted or Will Debut in 2020", to which Cravity took third place in the survey, garnering 19% of the votes for the men's criteria. In December 2020, Cravity was selected alongside Treasure as the 2020 "Best Male Newcomer In The Music Industry" by 25 of the most popular music agency experts and broadcasting company officials from 22 different Korean entertainment and broadcasting companies. At the end of 2020, Cravity was acclaimed as a "Monster Rookie" by multiple media outlets, mentioning their unstoppable growth and recognition as a rookie artist. The group went on to sweep the Rookie of the Year awards at large-scale awards ceremonies, setting a record of five trophies among many artists that debuted in 2020 and solidifying their position as a new artist representing 2020.

In February 2021, news outlet Ilgan Sports released their Lunar New Year idol survey special for the "Most Anticipated Singers in 2021", to which Cravity ranked eight in the list. Cravity took part in the conduct of the survey alongside 22 other idol groups and soloists such as (G)I-dle, Mamamoo, Seventeen, TXT, and Changmo. At the end of 2021, as leading media outlets locally highlighted Cravity's growth potential, the group went to expand their reach and received the spotlight from various global media outlets such as economic magazine Forbes, pop magazine PopWrapped, and MTV, leading to favorable reviews worthy of being a "K-pop rookie". In an article by media outlet Sports Khan, they mentioned Cravity as an "established global artist" with a promising future ahead of their career.

In April 2023, news outlet Daily An released a report among post-covid fourth-generation K-Pop male idols who managed to strive in their careers despite the impact of COVID-19, in which they listed Cravity alongside TXT, Treasure, Enhypen, and Xdinary Heroes as the only acts who managed to maintain continuous attention from the public without any stagnation. In July 2023, the All About editorial department conducted a survey in Japan on who is their "Most Favorite Male Group" between the fourth generation of K-Pop, to which Cravity (7th place) joined Stray Kids, Enhypen, Tomorrow X Together, Treasure, Ateez, and The Boyz as the only acts chosen by the Japanese respondents. During the same month, Oricon, the leading music chart provider in Japan, highlighted Cravity as an exceptional fourth-generation super pop rookie group. They noted the high anticipation surrounding the group's long-awaited Japanese debut, emphasizing that it's unusual for successful groups in Japan to make their debut so late in the country.

== Members ==
Adapted from the group's profile on Naver and Starship Entertainment's official website.

- Serim (세림) – leader, rapper
- Allen (앨런) – dancer, rapper
- Jungmo (정모) – vocalist
- Woobin (우빈) – vocalist
- Wonjin (원진) – leader, vocalist, dancer
- Minhee (민희) – vocalist
- Hyeongjun (형준) – leader, dancer, vocalist
- Taeyoung (태영) – dancer, vocalist
- Seongmin (성민) – vocalist

== Discography ==
=== Studio albums ===
List of studio albums, showing selected details, selected chart positions, sales figures, and certifications
Title	Details	Peak chart positions			Sales	Certifications
Title	Details	KOR	JPN	JPN Cmb.	Sales	Certifications
The Awakening: Written in the Stars	Released: August 19, 2021; Label: Starship Entertainment; Formats: CD, digital download	3	11	18	KOR: 184,967; JPN: 5,778	
Liberty: In Our Cosmos	Released: March 22, 2022; Label: Starship Entertainment; Formats: CD, digital download	1	31	50	KOR: 156,719; JPN: 3,605	
Dare to Crave	Released: June 23, 2025; Label: Starship Entertainment; Formats: CD, digital download	2	—	—	KOR: 272,597	KMCA: Platinum
Dare to Crave: Epilogue	Released: November 10, 2025; Label: Starship Entertainment; Formats: CD, digital download	14	—	—	KOR: 36,046	
"—" denotes releases that did not chart or were not released in that region

=== Extended plays ===
==== Korean extended plays ====
List of Korean extended plays, showing selected details, selected chart positions, sales figures, and certifications
Title	Details	Peak chart positions			Sales	Certifications
Title	Details	KOR	JPN	JPN Cmb.	Sales	Certifications
Season 1. Hideout: Remember Who We Are	Released: April 14, 2020; Label: Starship Entertainment; Formats: CD, digital download	1	10	13	KOR: 154,360; JPN: 7,304	
Season 2. Hideout: The New Day We Step Into	Released: August 24, 2020; Label: Starship Entertainment; Formats: CD, digital download	1	15	18	KOR: 166,644; JPN: 10,966	
Season 3. Hideout: Be Our Voice	Released: January 19, 2021; Label: Starship Entertainment; Formats: CD, digital download	3	12	16	KOR: 176,511; JPN: 8,869	
New Wave	Released: September 27, 2022; Label: Starship Entertainment; Formats: CD, digital download	1	11	21	KOR: 223,331; JPN: 7,032	
Master: Piece	Released: March 6, 2023; Label: Starship Entertainment; Formats: CD, digital download	2	18	25	KOR: 306,364; JPN: 6,889	KMCA: Platinum
Sun Seeker	Released: September 11, 2023; Label: Starship Entertainment; Formats: CD, digital download	1	38	—	KOR: 337,203; JPN: 1,788	KMCA: Platinum
Evershine	Released: February 26, 2024; Label: Starship Entertainment; Formats: CD, digital download	2	8	12	KOR: 364,560; JPN: 9,147	KMCA: Platinum
Redefine	Released: April 29, 2026; Label: Starship Entertainment; Formats: CD, digital download	4	16	—	KOR: 195,017; JPN: 3,839	
Sonorous	Released: September 30, 2026; Label: Starship Entertainment; Formats: CD, digital download	4	—	—	KOR: 202,164	
"—" denotes releases that did not chart or were not released in that region.

==== Japanese extended plays ====
List of Japanese extended plays, showing selected details, selected chart positions, and sales figures
Title	Details	Peak chart positions			Sales
Title	Details	JPN	JPN Cmb.	JPN Hot	Sales
Dilly Dally	Released: December 6, 2023; Label: Victor Entertainment; Formats: CD, digital download	8	8	7	JPN: 23,378
Jelly Bean	Released: March 26, 2025; Label: Victor Entertainment; Formats: CD, digital download	8	9	74	JPN: 18,046

=== Single albums ===
List of single albums, showing selected details, selected chart positions, and sales figures
Title	Details	Peak chart positions	Sales	Certifications
Title	Details	KOR	Sales	Certifications
Find the Orbit	Released: December 5, 2024; Label: Starship Entertainment; Formats: CD, digital download	3	KOR: 299,309	KMCA: Platinum

=== Singles ===
==== Korean singles ====
List of Korean singles, showing year released, selected chart positions, and name of the album
Title	Year	Peak positions		Album
Title	Year	KOR	KOR Hot	Album
"Break All the Rules"	2020	— (Note: "Break All the Rules" did not enter on the Circle Digital Chart but appeared at number 67 on the component Circle Download Chart.)	—	Season 1. Hideout: Remember Who We Are
"Flame"	2020	— (Note: "Flame" did not enter on the Circle Digital Chart but appeared at number 81 on the component Circle Download Chart.)	97	Season 2. Hideout: The New Day We Step Into
"My Turn"	2021	— (Note: "My Turn" did not enter on the Circle Digital Chart but appeared at number 21 on the component Circle Download Chart.)	—	Season 3. Hideout: Be Our Voice
"Gas Pedal"	2021	— (Note: "Gas Pedal" did not enter on the Circle Digital Chart but appeared at number 41 on the component Circle Download Chart.)	—	The Awakening: Written in the Stars
"Adrenaline"	2022	— (Note: "Adrenaline" did not enter on the Circle Digital Chart but appeared at number 7 on the component Circle Download Chart.)	—	Liberty: In Our Cosmos
"Party Rock"	2022	— (Note: "Party Rock" did not enter on the Circle Digital Chart but appeared at number 15 on the component Circle Download Chart.)	*	New Wave
"Groovy"	2023	132	*	Master: Piece
"Cheese"	2023	— (Note: "Cheese" did not enter on the Circle Digital Chart but appeared at number 68 on the component Circle Download Chart.)	*	Sun Seeker
"Ready or Not"	2023	— (Note: "Ready or Not" did not enter on the Circle Digital Chart but appeared at number 7 on the component Circle Download Chart.)	*	Sun Seeker
"Love or Die"	2024	127	*	Evershine
"Now or Never"	2024	137	*	Find the Orbit
"Set Net Go?!"	2025	94	*	Dare to Crave
"Lemonade Fever"	2025	119	*	Dare to Crave: Epilogue
"Awake"	2026	109	*	Redefine
"Louder"	2026	196	*	Sonorous
"—" denotes releases that did not chart or were not released in that region. "*" denotes that chart is now defunct.

==== Japanese singles ====
List of Japanese singles, showing year released, selected chart positions, sales figures, and name of the album
Title	Year	Peak positions			Sales	Album
Title	Year	JPN	JPN Cmb.	JPN Hot	Sales	Album
"Groovy" (Japanese version)	2023	3	6	15	JPN: 37,705 (phy.)	Non-album single
"Dilly Dally"	2023	—	—	—	—	Dilly Dally
"Show Off"	2024	3	8	23	JPN: 42,018 (phy.)	Non-album single
"Jelly Bean"	2025	—	—	—	—	Jelly Bean
"Blast Out"	2026	6	11	12	JPN: 28,272 (phy.)	Non-album single
"—" denotes releases that did not chart or were not released in that region.

==== English singles ====
List of English singles, showing year released, selected chart positions, and name of the album
Title	Year	Peak positions	Album
Title	Year	KOR DL	Album
"Boogie Woogie"	2022	92	New Wave

=== Promotional singles ===
List of promotional singles, showing year released, with selected chart positions, and name of the album
Title	Year	Peak positions	Album
Title	Year	KOR DL	Album
"Vivid" (Note: "Vivid" was released as a promotional single in collaboration with Universe.)	2022	198	Non-album single

=== Soundtrack appearances ===
List of soundtrack appearances, showing year released, and name of the album
Title	Year	Peak positions	Album
Title	Year	KOR DL	Album
"Ready Set Go"	2023	85	Amazing Rumor 2: Counter Punch OST
"Over & Over"	2024	42	XO, Kitty Season 2 OST

=== Compilation appearances ===
List of compilation appearances, showing year released, and name of the album
Title	Year	Album
"Historia"	2024	Road to Kingdom: ACE OF ACE <FINAL>

=== Other charted songs ===
List of other charted songs, showing year released, with selected chart positions, and name of the album
Title	Year	Peak positions	Album
Title	Year	KOR DL	Album
"Colorful"	2022	87	New Wave
"Knock Knock"	2022	89	New Wave
"New Addiction"	2022	91	New Wave
"Automatic"	2022	93	New Wave
"Fly"	2023	50	Master: Piece
"A to Z"	2023	51	Master: Piece
"Light the way"	2023	53	Master: Piece
"Baddie"	2023	54	Master: Piece
"Get Lifted"	2023	55	Master: Piece
"Love Fire"	2023	72	Sun Seeker
"Megaphone"	2023	73	Sun Seeker
"9 o'clock"	2023	75	Sun Seeker
"Vibration"	2023	76	Sun Seeker
"Over & Over"	2024	42	Evershine
"Cherry Blossom"	2024	43	Evershine
"C`est La Vie"	2024	44	Evershine
"Mr."	2024	45	Evershine
"Worst Thriller"	2024	48	Evershine
"Secret"	2024	73	Find the Orbit
"Horizon"	2024	74	Find the Orbit

== Videography ==
=== Music videos ===
Title	Year	Director(s)	Ref.
"Break All the Rules"	2020	Highqualityfish	
"Cloud 9"	2020	Vishop (Vikings League)	
"Flame"	2020	Vishop (Vikings League)	
"My Turn"	2021	Sam Son (Highqualityfish)	
"Bad Habits" (Performance Video)	2021	Jimmy (VIA)	
"Gas Pedal"	2021	Sam Son (Highqualityfish)	
"Veni Vidi Vici" (Special Video)	2021	Jimmy (VIA)	
"Adrenaline"	2022	Sam Son (Highqualityfish)	
"Vivid"	2022	Kwon Yong-soo (Sacchain Film)	
"Party Rock"	2022	Bart (Flipevil)	
"Groovy"	2023	Bart (Flipevil)	
"Groovy" (Japanese Version)	2023	Jimmy (VIA)	
"Cheese"	2023	Jimmy (VIA)	
"Ready or Not"	2023	Woonghui	
"Megaphone"	2023	Jimmy (VIA)	
"Dilly Dally"	2023	Kang Min-jun	
"Love or Die"	2024	Lee Yong-seok (What's Worth Studio)	
"C’est La Vie"	2024	Lee Jun-yeop (KEEPUSWEIRD)	
"Now or Never"	2024	Rigend Film	
"Jelly Bean"	2025	DAI IKEDA	

=== Other videos ===
Title	Year	Director(s)	Ref.
"CRAVITY 'What's Your Gravity?'"	2023	88 Gymnastic Heroes	

=== DVD ===
Title	Album details
"2021 Cravity Summer Package [Come Together]"	Released: July 31, 2020; Label: Starship Entertainment; Format: DVD + Photobook
"2021 Cravity Summer Package [Stand Together]"	Released: September 8, 2020; Label: Starship Entertainment; Format: DVD + Photobook
"Cravity 2021 Season's Greetings"	Released: December 18, 2020; Label: Starship Entertainment; Format: DVD + Photobook
"Cravity League of The Universe"	Released: June 10, 2021; Label: Starship Entertainment; Format: DVD + Photobook
"Cravity 2022 Season's Greetings [Band CRVT]"	Released: December 23, 2021; Label: Starship Entertainment; Format: DVD + Photobook
"Cravity 2023 Season's Greetings [CRVT's Sweets]"	Released: November 23, 2022; Label: Starship Entertainment; Format: DVD + Photobook
"2023 Cravity Fan-Con [Dear My Luvity]"	Released: August 4, 2023; Label: Starship Entertainment; Format: DVD + Photobook
"Cravity 2024 Season's Greetings [CRVT Stay]"	Released: November 11, 2023; Label: Starship Entertainment; Format: DVD + Photobook

== Filmography ==
=== Reality shows ===
Year	Title	Note(s)	Network	Ref.
2020–present	Cravity Park	Season 1–7	YouTube	
2020–present	C-Real	Behind the scenes of members' everyday life.	YouTube	
2020–present	C-Record	Behind the scenes of members' promotions.	YouTube	
2020–present	Before Cravity	Behind the scenes of members' trainee days.	YouTube	
2020–present	C-Plus+	Compilation of members' individual song covers.	YouTube	
2020–present	for. Luvity	Special Fanship paid contents of Cravity.	V Live, (Note: for. Luvity was broadcast on VLive until the app's shutdown in 2022. The broadcast eventually transferred to Cafe Daum.) Cafe Daum	
2021	Super Junior's Idol vs Idol	Appeared on episode 25–28.	KNTV / KNTV801	
2022–present	C-Log	Vlog content containing daily life of the members.	YouTube	
2022	Gwamorip-Jang Level Up	Universe original contents of Cravity.	Universe	
2022	Parasite Challenge by Cravity	Universe original contents of Cravity.	Universe	
2022	Ssap-Dance	Universe original contents of Cravity.	Universe	
2022	Stress Thing	Universe original contents of Cravity.	Universe	
2022	Prize Winning Survival Show: Gae Ppang Meong	Universe original contents of Cravity.	Universe	
2022	The Game Caterers X Starship Entertainment	Members Serim, Minhee, Hyeongjun, Jungmo and Seongmin represented Cravity.	tvN, YouTube	
2022–present	C-Port	Brief record of the groups' main schedules.	YouTube	

=== Radio shows ===
Year	Title	Note(s)	Network	Ref.
2021–present	Parallel Universe	Universe original radio contents of Cravity.	Universe	
2021–present	Hello Luvity	Universe original radio contents of Cravity.	Universe	
2022	Catch Up! Cravity	Universe original radio contents of Cravity.	Universe	
2022	Respect My Preference	Universe original radio contents of Cravity.	Universe	
2022	Station Z	Radio DJ for the month of February, every Saturday.	KBS Cool FM, YouTube	

=== Short films ===
Year	Title	Note(s)	Ref.
2020–2021	Cravity: League of the Hidden Universe	Videos delivering a unique and mysterious message on Cravity's Hidden Universe.	
2021	Hidden Dungeon: Cicada 3301	Story of Cravity, a supernatural being, who tried to unravel the 'Cicada3301' to discover the mystery of the 'Cicada Pattern'.	

== Concerts and tours ==
=== Headlining tours ===
2023 Cravity The 1st World Tour 'Masterpiece'
Date	City	Country	Venue	Ref
May 13, 2023	Seoul	South Korea	Olympic Hall; Beyond Live (Note: May 14 only.)	
May 14, 2023	Seoul	South Korea	Olympic Hall; Beyond Live	
June 2, 2023	Osaka	Japan	Grand Cube Osaka	
June 3, 2023	Osaka	Japan	Grand Cube Osaka	
June 6, 2023	Yokohama	Japan	Pacifico Yokohama	
June 7, 2023	Yokohama	Japan	Pacifico Yokohama	
June 16, 2023	New York City	USA	Webster Hall	
June 18, 2023	Chicago	USA	Copernicus Center	
June 20, 2023	San Juan	Puerto Rico	Sala Sinfonica de Bellas Artes	
June 22, 2023	Atlanta	USA	Heaven at the Masquerade	
June 23, 2023	Dallas	USA	House of Blues	
June 25, 2023	Los Angeles	USA	Avalon Hollywood	
July 8, 2023	Taipei	Taiwan	NTU Sports Center 1F	
July 29, 2023	Hong Kong		KITEC, Rotunda 3	
August 5, 2023	Manila	Philippines	New Frontier Theater	
October 28, 2023	Bangkok	Thailand	Chaengwattana Hall	

=== Concert ===
Cravity The 1st Concert 'Center of Gravity'
Date	City	Country	Venue	Ref
April 2, 2022	Seoul	South Korea	Olympic Hall; Beyond Live (Note: Online streaming on the platform "Beyond Live" was available for April 3 only.)	
April 3, 2022	Seoul	South Korea	Olympic Hall; Beyond Live	

=== Fan-con and live tours ===
'Cravity The 1st Fan-con 'Center of Gravity'
Date	City	Country	Venue	Attendance	Ref
June 29, 2022	Osaka	Japan	Zepp Osaka Bayside	5,600	
June 30, 2022	Osaka	Japan	Zepp Osaka Bayside	5,600	
October 19, 2022	Tokyo	Japan	Toyosu PIT	5,200	
October 20, 2022	Tokyo	Japan	Toyosu PIT	5,200	
October 21, 2022	Osaka	Japan	Orix Theater	7,200	
October 22, 2022	Osaka	Japan	Orix Theater	7,200	
November 5, 2022	Bangkok	Thailand	CentralWorld	N/A	
November 27, 2022	Taipei	Taiwan	Taipei International Convention Center	1,200	
2023 Cravity Fan-con 'Dear My Luvity'
February 18, 2023	Seoul	South Korea	Bluesquare Mastercard Hall; Beyond Live (Note: February 19 only.)	N/A	
February 19, 2023	Seoul	South Korea	Bluesquare Mastercard Hall; Beyond Live	N/A	
2024 Cravity Fan-con 'Luvity Games'
April 6, 2024	Seoul	South Korea	Olympic Hall	6,000	
April 7, 2024	Seoul	South Korea	Olympic Hall	6,000	
2024 Cravity Fan-con LOVE! LUV! LUVITY! “SHOW OFF”
June 4, 2024	Saitama	Japan	Omiya Sonic City Large Hall	N/A	
June 5, 2024	Saitama	Japan	Omiya Sonic City Large Hall	N/A	
June 6, 2024	Osaka	Japan	Osaka Orix Theater Main Hall	N/A	
June 7, 2024	Osaka	Japan	Osaka Orix Theater Main Hall	N/A	
2024 Cravity Fan-con 'Beyond Your Memories'
October 19, 2024	Hong Kong	Hong Kong	MacPherson Stadium	N/A	
October 20, 2024	Hong Kong	Hong Kong	MacPherson Stadium	N/A	
November 30, 2024	Taipei	Taiwan	NTU Sports Center	N/A	
2025 Cravity Japan Live Tour 'Bitter & Sweet'
February 10, 2025	Osaka	Japan	Festival Hall	8,100	
February 11, 2025	Osaka	Japan	Festival Hall	8,100	
February 14, 2025	Tokyo	Japan	Line Cube Shibuya	6,250	
February 15, 2025	Tokyo	Japan	Line Cube Shibuya	6,250	

=== Concert participation ===
Title	Date	City	Country	Venue	Ref
"TikTok Stage Live from SEOUL"	May 25, 2020	N/A (Offline concerts)	South Korea	N/A (Note: "At the online concert 'TikTok Stage Live From Seoul' to be held on the 25th, Apink, AKMU, Oh My Girl, Monsta X, iKON, KARD, Kang Daniel, CIX, Cravity (in order of debut), etc. The K-Pop artists' lineup has been revealed.)	
"KCON:TACT 2020 Summer"	June 21, 2020	N/A (Offline concerts)	South Korea	N/A (Note: "The concert of 'K Contact 2020 Summer' will be held live for over 4 hours from 10 pm every night for a week. It is planned to present an interactive stage where artists and fans can meet and communicate interactively in a virtual space of various concepts based on new technologies specialized for online and mobile, with a total of 33 artists appearing for a week, 4–5 teams each.)	
2020 Pepsi Online Showcase for the Love Of Korea	June 27, 2020	N/A (Offline concerts)	South Korea	N/A (Note: "The 'Pepsi Online Showcase' hosted by the global beverage brand Pepsi confirmed the appearance of Korea's representative Hallyu stars and announced that it would be held without spectators.)	
"The 26th Dream Concert CONNECT:D"	July 25, 2020	N/A (Offline concerts)	South Korea	N/A (Note: "The 26th Dream Concert CONNECT:D" is an online concert, special technology is used for the audience to vividly deliver the sense of realism of offline performances to fans around the world.)	
"Worldwide Live On Concert"	August 29, 2020	N/A (Offline concerts)	South Korea	N/A (Note: "Offline concert for a quick recovery and new hope with Korea's best K-POP No.1 Grade skillful and well-known musicians, Monsta X, Cosmic Girls, The Boyz and Cravity.)	
"2020 SBS Super ON:TACT"	October 18, 2020	N/A (Offline concerts)	South Korea	N/A (Note: "Super On-tact', designed in an on-tact method for domestic and foreign fans who cannot go to the concert site due to Corona 19, is an online streaming concert at 8 pm every Sunday for 4 weeks from September 27 to October 18. It will be broadcast live around the world through 'V Live'.)	
2020 Korea Music Drive-In Festival	October 31, 2020	N/A (Offline concerts)	South Korea	N/A (Note: "On October 31, the first day of 'KMDF' held at the Incheon Port International Passenger Terminal in Songdo, Incheon, NCT U, Astro, AB6IX, The Boyz, Lovelyz, Momoland, Pentagon, CIX, (G)I-DLE, Kim Jae-hwan, WJSN, ATEEZ, CRAVITY, CLC, Golden Child, Cherry Bullet, Rocket Punch, Drippin, Giant Pink, Dreamcatcher, Cignature, DKB, BOY (B.O.Y), 3YE (Third Eye), No Brain, ADOY, Inalchi, Park Munchi, Galaxy Express, Jiyunhae, and Lowdown 30 have confirmed their appearances.")	
2020 K-Pop x K-Art Concert Super KPA	November 27, 2020	N/A (Offline concerts)	South Korea	N/A (Note: "Offline concert, it will be broadcast live on 'V Live' (Beyond Live).)	
2021 Uni-Kon	February 14, 2021	N/A (Offline concerts)	South Korea	N/A (Note: "UNI-KON consists of a total of 4 parts, 'STAR-ROAD', 'GRAVITY', 'EVOLUTION', and 'UNIVERSE'. X), Park Jihoon, CIX, ASTRO, IZ*ONE, (G)I-DLE, Oh My Girl, Cosmic Girls, AB6IX, ATEEZ, WEi, CRAZY 14 teams of K-POP artists, including CRAVITY, performed on a passionate stage.")	
IdolLive Mini Concert "Adola 4U"	February 23, 2021	N/A (Offline concerts)	South Korea	N/A (Note: "'Adola 4U' is a non-face-to-face online concert featuring 4 representative K-pop idol teams, including VICTON, ACE, AleXa, and Cravity.")	
On-Tact G-KPOP Concert	May 15, 2021	N/A (Offline concerts)	South Korea	N/A	
Joy Ruckus Club K-Pop Superfest	June 20, 2021	N/A (Offline concerts)	South Korea	N/A (Note: "Joy Ruckus Club K-POP SUPERFEST, which received attention for its colorful lineup, unveiled the lineup on the Joy Ruckus Club official website and SNS on Saturday, May 29th, Korean time. The lineup includes male solo singer Rain, groups AB6IX, CRAVITY, Golden Child, THE BOYZ, Lovelyz, and MOMOLAND.")	
"We All Are One" K-Pop Concert	August 29, 2021	N/A (Offline concerts)	South Korea	N/A (Note: "Online concert, performances and online cheering sites are broadcast live through Red Angel's own streaming service 'Cushion Live'.")	
Incheon K-Pop Concert	September 25, 2021	N/A (Offline concerts)	South Korea	N/A (Note: "As it is difficult to site a venue due to COVID-19 this year, the concert will meet domestic and foreign fans through real-time streaming.")	
Changwon K-Pop World Festival	October 15, 2021	N/A (Offline concerts)	South Korea	N/A (Note: "On this day, abundant performances by K-pop stars such as Monsta X, The Boyz, Stray Kids, Oh My Girl, Ateez, Espa, Oneus, and Cravity were also prepared. The beauty of Changwon and Korea was conveyed to K-POP fans.")	
"On The K: The First Stage"	October 29, 2021	N/A (Offline concerts)	South Korea	N/A (Note: "Online concert, Cravity performed Veni Vidi Vici, My Turn, and Gas Pedal.")	
2021 SBS Super Concert in Daegu	October 31, 2021	Daegu	South Korea	Daegu Stadium	
2021 1theK Nodam Concert	November 26, 2021	N/A (Offline concert)	South Korea	N/A (Note: "Online concert, aims to spread awareness and prevent smoking among youth.")	
Welcome K-Pop Click	January 15, 2022	Seoul	South Korea	World K-Pop Center Glass Hall	
KCON 2022 Premiere US	May 20, 2022	Chicago	USA	Rosemont Theatre	
The 28th Dream Concert	June 23, 2022	Seoul	South Korea	Seoul Olympic Stadium	
2022 Uni-Kon	July 3, 2022	N/A (Offline concert)	South Korea	N/A (Note: "The online and offline universe concert '2022 UNI-KON', which was held for two days on the 2nd and 3rd, was successfully completed with 3.8 million K-pop fans from 200 countries around the world.")	
HallyuPopFest London	July 10, 2022	Wembley	United Kingdom	Wembley Arena	
Seezn Summer Concert	July 17, 2022	Seoul	South Korea	Jangchung Arena	
The Star Next Stage	August 2, 2022	Yokohama	Japan	Pia Arena MM	
The Star Next Stage	August 4, 2022	Kobe	Japan	World Memorial Hall	
The Star Next Stage	August 9, 2022	Fukuoka	Japan	Marine Messe	
KCON 2022 LA	August 20, 2022	Los Angeles	USA	Los Angeles Convention Center	
KCON 2022 LA	August 21, 2022	Los Angeles	USA	Los Angeles Convention Center	
KCON US Tour	August 24, 2022	San Francisco	USA	Orpheum Theater	
KCON US Tour	August 26, 2022	Minneapolis	USA	State Theater	
KCON US Tour	August 28, 2022	Houston	USA	Sarofim Hall	
Mezamashi Live	August 28, 2022	N/A (Offline concert)	Japan	N/A (Note: "A variety of live performances from artists related to Mezamashi.")	
KCON US Tour	August 29, 2022	Dallas	USA	Texas Trust CU Theater	
KCON US Tour	August 31, 2022	Atlanta	USA	The Eastern	
KCON US Tour	September 2, 2022	New York	USA	Terminal 5	
Lalapa K-Concert	September 24, 2022	Bangkok	Thailand	Union Hall	
The K-Concert	October 7, 2022	Seoul	South Korea	Jamsil Stadium	
Suncheon Bay International Garden Expo Opening Ceremony	March 31, 2023	Suncheon	South Korea	Garden in the Water	
Next Generation Live Arena	April 22, 2023	Yokohama	Japan	Pia Arena MM	
KPOP Lux SBS Super Concert	July 22, 2023	Madrid	Spain	Estadio Cívitas Metropolitano	
KCON 2023 LA	August 18, 2023	Los Angeles	USA	Los Angeles Convention Center	
Kampfest CDMX	August 19, 2023	Mexico City	Mexico	Parque Bicentenario	
Krazy K-Pop Super Concert	August 26, 2023	New York	USA	UBS Arena	
KBS Open Concert	September 22, 2023	Gyeonggi-do	South Korea	Hwaseong Sports Complex	TBD
Promised Play Festival	October 4, 2023	Seoul	South Korea	Seoul Children's Grand Park	
K-Pop Festival Prague	October 6, 2023	Prague	Czech Republic	O2 Arena	
Next Generation Live Arena	November 23, 2023	Yokohama	Japan	Pia Arena MM	
Korean Festival-THE NEXT	November 29, 2023	Seoul	South Korea	KBS Annex Public Hall	
SHARING & TOGETHER Concert	January 12, 2024	Seoul	South Korea	SK Handball Stadium	
WE BRIDGE Music Festival and Expo	April 26, 2024	Las Vegas	USA	Mandalay Bay Convention Center	
SBS MEGA CONCERT	May 19, 2024	Incheon	South Korea	Incheon Munhak Stadium	
Aein (愛仁) Festival	May 29, 2024	Gimhae	South Korea	Inje University	
PEPSI FESTA: The New Era	September 22, 2024	Seoul	South Korea	Jamsil Students' Gymnasium	
Changwon K-POP World Festival	October 25, 2024	Changwon	South Korea	Changwon Stadium	
Road to Kingdom: ACE OF ACE Concert	January 4–5, 2025	Seoul	South Korea	Seoul Olympics Gymnastics Arena	
Supersound Festival	January 18, 2025	Macau	China	The Venetian Arena	
Trend Wave	May 3, 2025	Incheon	South Korea	Incheon Asiad Main Stadium	
KCON Japan	May 9, 2025	Chiba	Japan	Makuhari Messe Convention Center	
KCON Japan	May 11, 2025	Chiba	Japan	Makuhari Messe Convention Center	
Kpop Masterz	May 31, 2025	Kuala Lumpur	Malaysia	Mines International Exhibition & Convention Centre	
KCON LA	August 3, 2025	Los Angeles	USA	Crypto.com Arena	

== Awards and nominations ==
Name of the award ceremony, year presented, award category, nominee(s) of the award, and the result of the nomination
Award ceremony	Year	Category	Nominee(s)/work(s)	Result	Ref.
Asia Artist Awards	2020	Male Potential Artist Award	Cravity	Won	
Asia Artist Awards	2020	Male Singer Popularity Award	Cravity	Longlisted	
Asia Artist Awards	2021	Male Idol Group Popularity Award	Cravity	Shortlisted	
Asia Artist Awards	2021	U+ Idol Live Popularity Award	Cravity	Nominated	
Asia Artist Awards	2022	Best Emotive Award	Cravity	Won	
Asia Artist Awards	2022	Idolplus Popularity Award	Cravity	Nominated	
Asia Artist Awards	2023	Male Group Popularity Award	Cravity	Nominated	
Asia Artist Awards	2024	Popularity Award: Male Singer	Cravity	Shortlisted	
Asia Model Awards	2020	New Star Award – Male Group	Cravity	Won	
Asia Star Entertainer Awards	2025	Best Male Group	Cravity	Longlisted	
Brand of the Year Awards	2020	Rookie Male Idol Award	Cravity	Won	
Brand of the Year Awards	2021	Male Idol of the Year (Rising Star)	Cravity	Nominated	
Brand of the Year Awards	2022	Male Idol of the Year (Rising Star)	Cravity	Nominated	
Brand of the Year Awards	2023	Male Idol of the Year	Cravity	Nominated	
Brand of the Year Awards	2024	Male Idol Who Shined in 2024	Cravity	Nominated	
Brand Customer Loyalty Awards (Note: Co-organized by the Korean Customers Council and Brand Keys, this event recognizes the most influential brands in society and culture, as determined through consumer research.)	2022	Male Rising Idol Star	Cravity	Nominated	
Brand Customer Loyalty Awards	2023	Most Influential Male Group of 2023	Cravity	Nominated	
Circle Chart Music Awards	2021	MuBeat Global Choice Award (Male)	Cravity	Longlisted	
Circle Chart Music Awards	2021	New Artist of the Year – Physical	Season 2. Hideout: The New Day We Step Into	Nominated	
Circle Chart Music Awards	2022	MuBeat Global Choice Award (Male)	Cravity	Longlisted	
Circle Chart Music Awards	2023	MuBeat Global Choice Award (Male)	Cravity	Longlisted	
Circle Chart Music Awards	2024	MuBeat Global Choice Award (Male)	Cravity	Longlisted	
Circle Chart Music Awards	2024	VIAJE Global Popularity Award	Cravity	Shortlisted	
D Awards (Note: Hosted by Sports Dong-a, this event celebrates the artists who have elevated K-pop on the global stage. It was founded to further amplify the genre’s impact, highlighting how K-pop continues to captivate hearts worldwide by delivering "Dreams" and "Delights"—the very essence of its universal appeal.)	2025	Best Boy Group Popularity Award	Cravity	Nominated	
Dong-A.com's Pick	2020	Idol Pick Super Rookie	Cravity	Won	
Golden Disc Awards	2021	Curaprox Popularity Award	Cravity	Nominated	
Golden Disc Awards	2021	Disc Bonsang	Season 2. Hideout: The New Day We Step Into	Nominated	
Golden Disc Awards	2021	Prominent Album of the Million Seller	Season 2. Hideout: The New Day We Step Into	Nominated	
Golden Disc Awards	2021	Rookie Award	Cravity	Nominated	
Golden Disc Awards	2021	QQ Music Popularity Award	Cravity	Nominated	
Golden Disc Awards	2022	Disc Bonsang	Season 3. Hideout: Be Our Voice	Nominated	
Golden Disc Awards	2022	Seezn Most Popular Artist Award	Cravity	Nominated	
Hanteo Music Awards	2021	WhosFandom Award	Cravity	Nominated	
Hanteo Music Awards	2022	Artist of the Year (Daesang)	Cravity	Nominated	
Hanteo Music Awards	2022	Global Artist Award	Cravity	Longlisted	
Hanteo Music Awards	2022	Post Generation Award	Cravity	Nominated	
Hanteo Music Awards	2022	WhosFandom Award	Cravity	Longlisted	
Hanteo Music Awards	2023	Artist of the Year (Main Prize)	Cravity	Nominated	
Hanteo Music Awards	2023	Post Generation Award	Cravity	Nominated	
Hanteo Music Awards	2023	WhosFandom Award	Cravity	Longlisted	
Hanteo Music Awards	2024	WhosFandom Award	Cravity	Longlisted	
Hanteo Music Awards	2024	Artist of the Year (Main Prize)	Cravity	Longlisted	
Hanteo Music Awards	2024	Global Artist Award	Cravity	Longlisted	
K-World Dream Awards (Note: Hosted by the Awards Organizing Committee, Celeb Media, and YJ Partners and sponsored by Sports Today, the K-World Dream Awards honors K-pop artists at the center of world culture as part of the Hallyu Wave.)	2022	Boy Group Popularity Award	Cravity	Nominated	
K-World Dream Awards	2023	Male Group Popularity Award	Cravity	Nominated	
K-World Dream Awards	2023	4th Gen Hot Icon Male Group Award	Cravity	Nominated	
K-World Dream Awards	2025	Best Performance Award	Cravity	Won	
Korea First Brand Awards (Note: The 2023 Korea First Brand Awards selected promising brands that are predicted to lead in the year 2023 based on criteria such as consumption trend analysis, extensive nationwide consumer surveys, and evaluation by experts.)	2021	New Male Artist Award	Cravity	Nominated	
Korea First Brand Awards	2022	Male Idol Rising Star Award	Cravity	Nominated	
Korea First Brand Awards	2023	Most Anticipated Male Group of 2023	Cravity	Nominated	
Korea First Brand Awards	2024	Male Group Rising Star Who Will Lead 2024	Cravity	Won	
Korea Grand Music Awards	2025	Best Artist (Top 10)	Cravity	Won	
Korea Grand Music Awards	2025	Best Stage	Cravity	Won	
MAMA Awards	2020	Best of Next	Cravity	Won	
MAMA Awards	2020	Artist of the Year	Cravity	Nominated	
MAMA Awards	2020	Best New Male Artist	Cravity	Nominated	
MAMA Awards	2020	Worldwide Fans' Choice Top 10	Cravity	Longlisted	
MAMA Awards	2023	Worldwide Fans' Choice Top 10	Cravity	Longlisted	
MAMA Awards	2024	Worldwide Fans' Choice Top 10	Cravity	Longlisted	
MAMA Awards	2025	Fans' Choice Top 10 – Male	Cravity	Nominated	
MAMA Awards	2025	Worldwide KCONER's Choice	Cravity	Nominated	
MTV Europe Music Awards	2021	Best Korean Act	Cravity	Nominated	
Melon Music Awards	2020	New Artist of the Year – Male	Cravity	Won	
MuBeat Awards	2020	Rookie Artist (Male)	Cravity	Nominated	
MuBeat Awards	2023	Stage Stealer	Groovy	Nominated	
Music Awards Japan	2025	Best K-Pop Song in Japan	Show Off	Longlisted	
Seoul Music Awards	2021	K-Wave Popularity Award	Cravity	Nominated	
Seoul Music Awards	2021	New Artist Award	Cravity	Nominated	
Seoul Music Awards	2021	Popularity Award	Cravity	Nominated	
Seoul Music Awards	2021	WhosFandom Award	Cravity	Nominated	
Seoul Music Awards	2022	K-Wave Popularity Award	Cravity	Nominated	
Seoul Music Awards	2022	Main Award (Bonsang)	Season 3. Hideout: Be Our Voice	Nominated	
Seoul Music Awards	2022	Popularity Award	Cravity	Nominated	
Seoul Music Awards	2022	U+Idol Live Best Artist Award	Cravity	Nominated	
Seoul Music Awards	2023	K-Wave Popularity Award	Cravity	Nominated	
Seoul Music Awards	2023	Main Award (Bonsang)	New Wave	Nominated	
Seoul Music Awards	2023	Popularity Award	Cravity	Nominated	
Seoul Music Awards	2024	Best OST	Ready, Set, Go	Nominated	
Seoul Music Awards	2025	Best Performance Award	Cravity	Won	
Soribada Best K-Music Awards	2020	Rookie Award	Cravity	Won	
Soribada Best K-Music Awards	2020	Main Award	Cravity	Nominated	
Supersound Festival	2025	Male Group Performance	Cravity	Won	
The Fact Music Awards	2020	Next Leader	Cravity	Won	
The Fact Music Awards	2020	Fan N Star Choice Award (Artist)	Cravity	Shortlisted	
The Fact Music Awards	2020	TMA Popularity Award	Cravity	Nominated	
The Fact Music Awards	2021	Global Hottest Award	Cravity	Won	
The Fact Music Awards	2021	Fan N Star Choice Award (Artist)	Cravity	Longlisted	
The Fact Music Awards	2022	Four Star Awards	Cravity	Nominated	
The Fact Music Awards	2022	Fan N Star Choice Award (Artist)	Cravity	Nominated	
The Fact Music Awards	2022	idolplus Popularity Award	Cravity	Longlisted	
The Fact Music Awards	2023	Four Star Awards	Cravity	Nominated	
The Fact Music Awards	2023	idolplus Popularity Award	Cravity	Longlisted	
