= V Live =

South Korean live video streaming service

- Website type: Video streaming
- Available in: Korean, English, Thai, Spanish, Vietnamese, Portuguese, Indonesian, Chinese (simplified), Chinese (traditional), Japanese
- Dissolved: December 31, 2022
- Successor: Weverse
- Owners: Naver Corporation (Note: V-Live was transferred to Weverse Company, a subsidiary of HYBE Corporation. Weverse Company is owned in a 51% by HYBE Corp. and 49% by Naver Corp.); (2015–2022); Weverse Company; (2022)
- Website: Archived official website at the Wayback Machine (archive index)
- Commercial: Yes
- Registration: Optional
- Launched: August 2015

V Live (stylized as VLIVE), sometimes referred to as V App, was a South Korean live video streaming service that allowed celebrities based in the country to broadcast live videos such as live chat sessions with fans, performances, reality shows and award shows on the internet. The service was available for streaming via web browsers on Windows, macOS, and Linux, as well as apps on iOS and Android devices. The company was launched by Naver Corporation in late August 2015, and transferred to Weverse Company on March 2, 2022. It was shut down after merging with Weverse on December 31, 2022.

V Live was a medium in which Korean celebrities could reach a global audience and has allowed non-Korean speaking fans worldwide to intimately interact with their favorite Hallyu idols. There was an online community on V Live for fan translators who created foreign subtitles so that more people could enjoy the content worldwide. Translators were ranked by the number of lines that they have translated. The subtitling process was made user-friendly so that fans did not need any specific technical skills. Contests and events were held to encourage fan-subbing. For example, fan translators in the past had won V coins and video calls with their favorite idols. Because of fan translators, some videos had as many as 17 subtitle options.

V Live had collaborated with RBW Entertainment Vietnam (a subsidiary of the Korean entertainment company) to produce a lot of Vietnamese-based shows. Moreover, V Live launched special mini-concerts called "V Heartbeat" to connect K-pop and V-pop stars. For their opening show they invited Winner to perform in Vietnam.

== History ==
In 2007, Naver Corporation launched its video platform channel, but availability was highly restricted and unavailable in many countries.

In early August 2015, Naver Corporation released the live streaming app, V Live. The application was originally available only on the Google Play Store for Android, but later launched on App Store for iOS. The app was aimed at reaching international fan bases, particularly those in Japan, China, Taiwan, Thailand and Vietnam. Therefore, there were no region restrictions and the website had a variety of language options, such as English, Chinese and Japanese.

V Live provided beta service on August 1, 2015, and the official service started on September 1, 2015.

V Live released the full Android version on September 2, 2015, and the full iOS version was released in mid-September 2015.

According to Sensor Tower, the application had 200,000 downloads and earned $600,000 in Aug 2017; by May 2018, the V Live app had over 1 million downloads on the Google Play Store and iTunes.

On January 27, 2021, it was announced that Naver Corporation, would transfer their V Live service to Hybe Corporation's technology subsidiary, Weverse Company Inc. (formerly known as beNX Inc.). The transfer started on March 2, 2022, starting with transfer of users information and change of management company leading to the gradual phase out of the service in favor of a consolidated service.

== Services and features ==
V Live had over 1,450 channels associated with different K-pop stars, including BTS, Big Bang, Blackpink, Winner, iKon, Exo, Red Velvet, Got7, Gfriend, TXT, Ateez, Treasure, Monsta X, BtoB, Astro, Apink, T-ara, NCT, Twice, Stray Kids, Itzy, Iz*One, Infinite, Mamamoo, Rocket Punch, Golden Child, Enhypen, Oneus, Victon, Seventeen, Shinhwa, Super Junior, Double S 301, Heo Young-saeng, and Jessica Jung. It also hosted channels for various actors and actresses, including Lee Jong-suk, Lee Dong-wook, and Park Bo-young. V Live broadcast programs that ranged from live performances and chat sessions with fans, to reality and award shows.

V Live also made it easy for fans to interact with the website. Users were alerted when a channel they followed began a live stream or uploaded new content. They could comment or send hearts on videos, which were visible to the idol or celebrity in real time. A special effects congratulatory message appeared on screen whenever the heart count exceeded 1, 10, or 100 million hearts. Every interaction contributed to the user's "chemi-beat", which tracked the users chemistry with a celebrity. Users could increase their chemi-beat by regularly engaging with a channel, turning on push notifications, and sharing videos. Having a high chemi-beat increased users chances of winning an event hosted by an idol.

=== V Live+ (Plus) ===
V Live+ referred to paid content types that offer unreleased, downloadable, and fan catered content. V Live+ content could be purchased with V coins, which roughly amounted to 50 for US$1, or redeemed using a code presented with an external purchase, such as an album.

=== CH+ (Channel+) ===
Some idols also offered CH+, a premium channel accessible only via subscription. CH+ channels could be purchased with V coins on a 30-day, 3 month, 6 month, or yearly basis. CH+ channels differed from regular channels in that they provided hidden broadcasts, videos, and posts. Behind-the-scenes footage of V Live-exclusive dramas, for example: Welcome to Heal Inn and We See Winter, both featuring Fromis 9, was also available.

Reality shows that aired exclusively on V Live CH+ included Real GOT7 and BTS: Bon Voyage.

=== V COIN ===
'V COIN' referred to the electronic currency within 'service' to purchase 'paid product'. 'Paid product' means various products (viewing rights to certain 'content', and/or download rights, specific features within 'service', etc.) that the 'member' can purchase within the 'service'. 'V COIN' could be purchased/recharged through and by app market purchase, credit card, cell phone, bank transfer, and other payment methods set by the company within the service platform. However, if 'member' selected the payment method with an independent operator, the 'member' must follow the payment procedures set by the relevant operator to continue with purchase (iOS only).

=== Stickers ===
Stickers were image items that could be used in V Live chat. Some sticker packs were restricted to particular channels and could only be used in these channel's chats. Stickers could be purchased in the STORE using V coins. Most sticker packs were either free or 100 coins (US$1.99).

The stickers ceased sales on December 1, 2021.

=== V Lightstick ===
V Lightstick (stylized in all caps) was a digital item that acted as a special "heart" icon. The V Lightstick provided the user with double the "hearts" when tapped, a special on-screen effect when heart milestones were hit and a 3 dimensional interactive object representing the lightstick. 1-day and 30-day passes were available for purchase in the STORE for 50 coins and 150 coins respectively. V Lightstick was only able to be used on the mobile app.

V Lightstick was introduced on December 7, 2018, and was originally only available for BTS, GOT7, Red Velvet, Monsta X, NU'EST W, and Twice. On December 27, 2018, V Live announced the expansion of V Lightstick to include Blackpink, iKon, Seventeen, Winner and Cosmic Girls.

The V Lightstick ceased sales on December 1, 2021.

=== V Fansubs ===
V Fansubs referred to the subtitling service that allowed users to submit their own foreign-language subtitle translations for V Live videos. These subtitles were reviewed by a team from V Fansubs before they were uploaded onto V Live. This subtitling feature had been a significant aspect of V Live's growth, attracting a large international fanbase outside of South Korea.

=== Chemi-beat ===
Chemi-beat referred to the level of "chemistry and beat" a user has with a certain channel. This corresponded to the amounts of interaction a user has with a certain channel. There were seven levels of Chemi-beat which a user could obtain. In addition, all users of each channel were ranked based on their Chemi-beat. These ranks were updated daily and the TOP 100 users were displayed on each channel's home page.

=== Beyond LIVE ===
In April 2020, it was announced South Korean largest entertainment company SM Entertainment and Naver had signed a Memorandum of Understanding (MOU) with the purpose to expand the reach of concerts to global audience. The joint efforts lead to the creation of "Beyond LIVE", a series of online live concerts which - according to SM representative - combine "SM's content development capabilities with Naver's platform technology". The concerts were hosted on Vlive app.

== Awards ==
The platform held yearly awards, colloquially called the V Live Awards, to honor the most popular people and content on the website. The primary awards, the Global Top 10 and Rookie Top 5, were awarded to the top ten most popular V Live channels, the latter specifically for new artists. Additional popularity awards were selected via online voting. Initially, the fifteen channels held an individual broadcast where they received the award, however, starting in 2019, V Live began presenting the awards at a ceremony entitled V Heartbeat.
