= Hyungwon =

South Korean singer (born 1994)

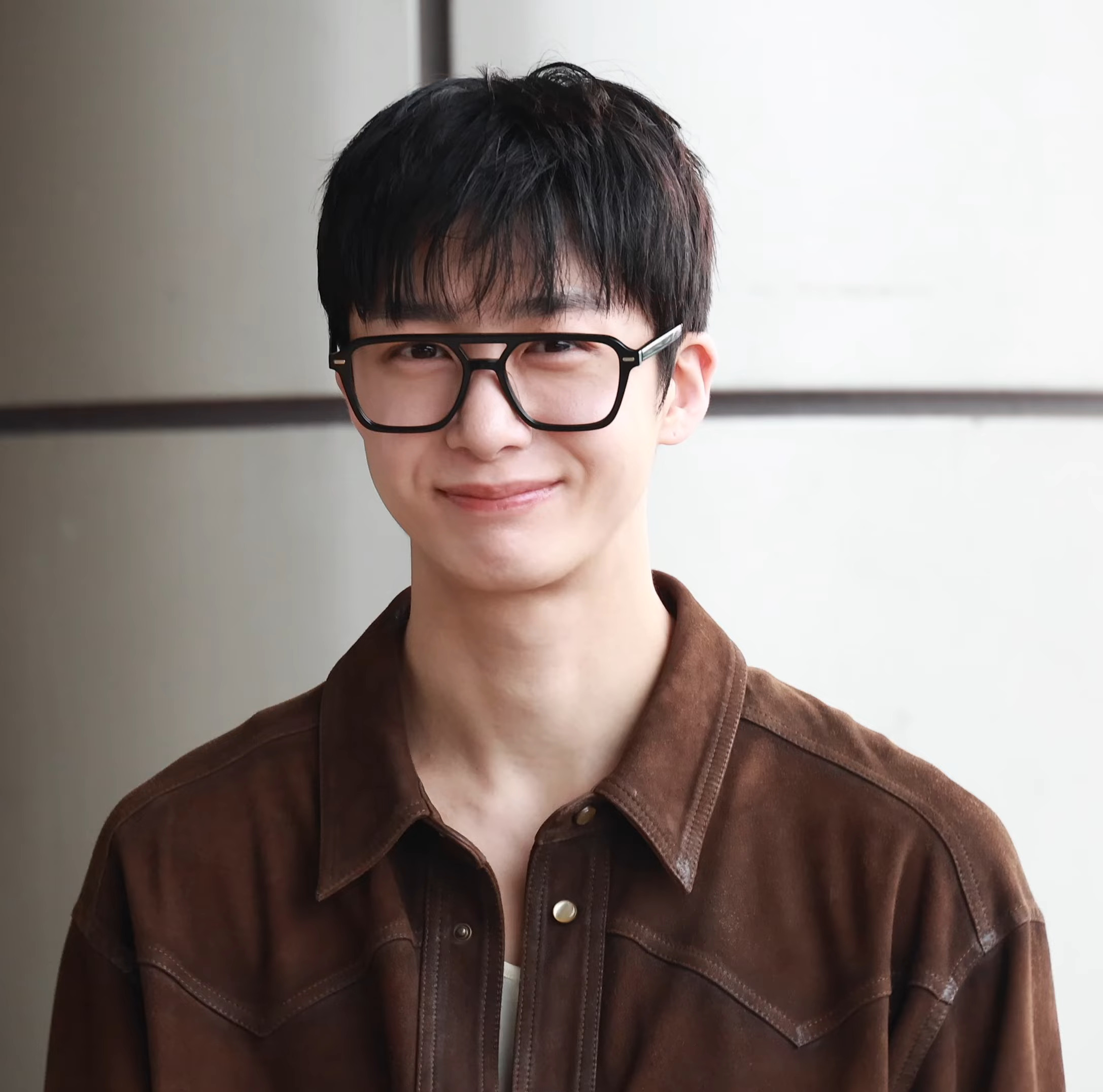
- Hyungwon in 2025
- Born: Chae Hyung-won; January 15, 1994 (age 32); Gwangsan-gu, Gwangju, South Korea
- Occupations: Singer; actor; model; DJ; MC; songwriter; producer
- Height: 182.4 cm (6 ft 0 in)
- Musical career
- Genres: K-pop; EDM
- Instrument: Vocals
- Years active: 2015–present
- Label: Starship
- Member of: Monsta X; Shownu X Hyungwon

Korean name
- Hangul: 채형원
- RR: Chae Hyeongwon
- MR: Ch'ae Hyŏngwŏn

Signature
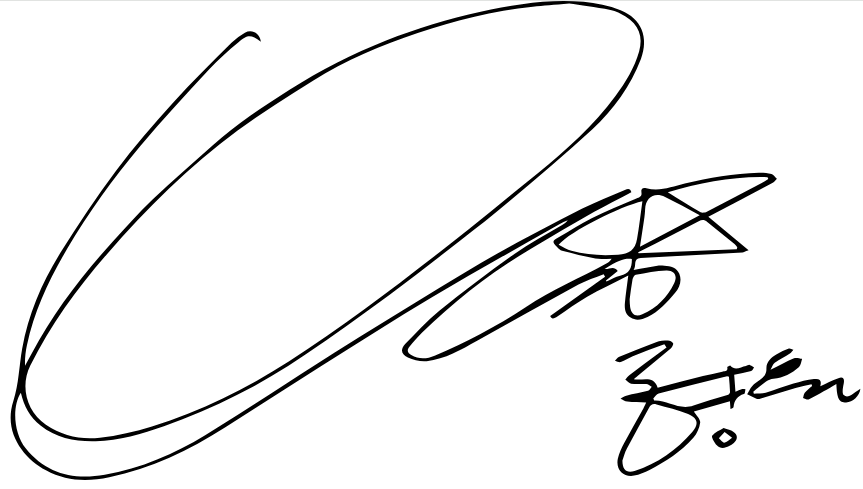

Chae Hyung-won (Korean: 채형원, born January 15, 1994), known mononymously as Hyungwon, is a South Korean singer, actor, model, DJ, MC, songwriter, and producer. He is a member of South Korean boy group Monsta X and its sub-unit Shownu X Hyungwon under Starship Entertainment. In 2017, he began performing as a DJ under the stage name DJ H.ONE.

== Career ==
=== Early life and debut ===
Hyungwon was born in Gwangju, South Korea on January 15, 1994.

In 2014, while being a trainee at Starship Entertainment, he worked as a model for various fashion shows, such as W Hotel and Ceci Fashion Show.

Beginning in December 2014, he competed in the Mnet's survival show No.Mercy, through which he debuted in the new hip-hop boy group Monsta X.

=== 2015–2019: Monsta X, DJ work and solo activities ===
On May 14, Hyungwon debuted with Monsta X upon the release of their first EP Trespass.

In January 2016, he appeared in K.Will's music video "You Call It Romance", where his performance gained praise for giving the music video a drama-like atmosphere.

The following year, in March 2017, Hyungwon made his official acting debut with Please Find Her, airing on KBS2. He played the supporting role of Jeon Ik-soo.

In May, Hyungwon began activities as a DJ, using the stage name DJ H.ONE, and performed a special stage in the KCON event KCON 2017 Japan, along with DJ Justin Oh, held at Makuhari Messe in Tokyo.

On June 10, he and DJ Justin Oh also appeared and performed together in the EDM festival Ultra Music Festival Korea, held at Jamsil Olympic Stadium in Seoul.

In September, Hyungwon's first single was in collaboration with DJ Justin Oh, titled "BAM!BAM!BAM!", which featured fellow group member Jooheon.

In December, he released a single as part of his work on the TV show Mix and the City, with DJ Justin Oh as producer, titled "1(One)", as well as the single "Just One More", produced by Cash Cash, with Jessi, Hyomin, Tritops, Jimin, and Xie.

In June 2018, Hyungwon once again was featured in the EDM festival Ultra Music Festival Korea, held at Everland Speedway in Seoul.

In July, he released the single "My Name", which featured Talksick, in collaboration with Dutch DJ Jimmy Clash.

Hyungwon collaborated with VIXX's Hongbin and producer dress for Pepsi's The Love of Summer: The Performance, releasing the song "Cool Love" on July 10, 2019.

=== 2020–present: Expanding in songwriting, other solo activities and sub-unit debut ===
In 2020, Hyungwon participated in the writing, composing, and arranging of the song "Nobody Else" for Monsta X's album Fatal Love. He collaborated again with Justin Oh for this track and it is the first song in which he was involved in each aspect of the song production. It was noted for showing Hyungwon's musical range when composing music, being so distinct in style from his EDM tracks as a DJ. In January 2021, the song charted at number ten on the Billboard World Digital Song Sales chart.

In June 2021, Hyungwon and Minhyuk were selected as new cast members for Youtube channel Inssa Oppa. For the show, they transformed into different "sub-characters" for each episode to introduce the latest trends and G-Market global shop products in entertainment format.

In July, Hyungwon with other Monsta X members' Shownu and I.M joined Pepsi's Taste of Korea summer campaign, releasing a promotional single "Summer Taste", alongside Rain, Brave Girls members' Yujeong and Yuna, and Ateez members' Hongjoong and Yunho.

In August, MBC's Idol Radio announced its second season to begin airing on August 9, with Hyungwon as a DJ alongside his group member Joohoney. The program is live streamed through Universe and aired through MBC Radio.

In November, Hyungwon starred in the new KakaoTV musical web series Fly Again as Han Yo-han, his first-ever lead role. It revolved around how he changed his dream, from being a genius dancer to becoming an idol upon meeting the school's dance club "Villainz". In December, he released an OST for the web series, titled "Picture", a dance song.

In December, Hyungwon appeared as one of the special judges in the Mnet's dance survival program Street Dance Girls Fighter's fourth mission, with his group members Joohoney and I.M, for Monsta X's B-side song "Autobahn".

In March 2022, Hyungwon and Minhyuk returned for the sixth season of Inssa Oppa. For this season, they focused on a concept of "what if" and perform situational plays on various themes, moving freely to any desired time, such as the past, present, and future. He tested positive for COVID-19 on March 28.

In September, Hyungwon was cast as the main character in the new TVING drama CEO-dol Mart, alongside Exo's Xiumin and Lee Shin-young, produced by The Great Show. It is a drama depicting episodes that occur while former members of an idol group run a mart. On September 30, he attended the DJing party 2022 DG Night, held at the Martini Bar of Dolce & Gabbana, as well as attending the pop-up store opening of Tommy Hilfiger's capsule collection, in collaboration with Richard Quinn, alongside Twice's Nayeon, held in Cheongdam-dong, Seoul.

On October 20, Hyungwon hosted and performed at MBC's Idol Radio's first overseas concert Idol Radio Live in Tokyo, alongside his group member Joohoney and Got7's Youngjae, with several other artists, held at Tokyo Garden Theater in Tokyo.

In January 2023, he attended the collaboration event of Louis Vuitton and Yayoi Kusama, held in Gangnam-gu, Seoul.

In February, Hyungwon and Minhyuk attended the Dyson Style Lab pop-up store's opening ceremony, held in Seongdong-gu, Seoul. He had a cover pictorial and interview for the ninth issue of Y Magazine, titled "Keep Calm and Carry On".

In March, Hyungwon was announced to be a special MC of SBS' Inkigayo, alongside Kim Ji-eun, starting in April, ending in July.

In May, Starship Entertainment announced that he will have a special appearance in the new Genie TV drama Oh! Youngsim.

On June 29, Hyungwon and Shownu attended the pop-up opening event of TAG Heuer's "Iconic Collection Carrera", in commemoration of its 60th anniversary, held in Gangnam-gu, Seoul.

On July 25, Hyungwon formed Monsta X's first official sub-unit Shownu X Hyungwon, along with Shownu. The duo released their debut EP The Unseen, with the lead single "Love Me a Little". He produced "Love Me a Little", as well as the B-side song "Roll with Me".

In August, Hyungwon had graced the cover of Singles' September issue.

In September, he launched an exclusive web entertainment show Chae's Drift on YouTube, with the first episode released on September 1. On September 9, Hyungwon attended the opening of Stone Island's archive exhibition, held in Seongdong-gu, Seoul. On September 20, he was announced to be participating for the soundtrack of CEO-dol Mart, titled "Now", a ballad song, released on September 22.

In May 2025, Hyungwon held a free fan event after his military discharge.

In August, he attended the 2025 KBO League season as its honorary first pitcher, during KIA Tigers and LG Twins game match, held at Gwangju-Kia Champions Field in Gwangju.

In May 2026, it was announced that Hyungwon's solo song "No Air", which he performed at The X: Nexus World Tour, will be included in his sub-unit's second EP Love Me. It was also announced that Hyungwon will be starring in a dark comedy short film Grim Reaper Life Extension Project as Jun-ho, a rookie grim reaper who pursues only principle and views death merely as a job, alongside Lee Min-ki.

== Personal life ==
=== Military service ===
Hyungwon enlisted for his mandatory military service as an active duty soldier on November 14, 2023. He served at the Capital Mechanized Infantry Division, while promoted to corporal early in June 2024 for his exemplary military career. Hyungwon also served as part of the military band. He was officially discharged on May 13, 2025.

== Artistry ==
=== Musical style and influences ===
Hyungwon's timbre often shines in songs with an "emotional mood", leaning on the "R&B" side, but still boasting an "intense beat and sound". He showed his abilities in the section of the song that "enhances the level of immersion or reversal of the atmosphere", while his musical mood expresses "despair" mixed with "depression and anger".

=== Concept and lyrical themes ===
Hyungwon's releases encapsulate themes of pain, ruin, and emotional introspection. His lyrics, often portraying a "readiness to fall apart for a loved one, fluctuate between crying out for love in the rain or expressing a burning thirst", which not only lies an "unattainable yearning", but also an "unwavering commitment and hope".

== Public image and impact ==
Hyungwon is known as an "all-rounder" and had often been receiving numerous "love calls" from the industry. He had been working for various fashion pictorials and fashion week as a model, as well as in various festivals as a DJ.

In 2021, Hyungwon was commemorated at the "K-pop Star Street", as part of Gwangju's cultural projects, along with other Korean artists who represented the city in the global music scene. He was consistently placed in Tumblr's "Most Popular K-pop Stars", ranking 44th in 2018, 51st in 2019, 77th in 2020, 70th in 2021, and 87th in 2022, as well as in "Individual Boy Group Members Brand Power Ranking" published by the Korean Corporate Reputation Research Institute, ranking at 27th in September 2022 as his highest.

In August 2022, Hyungwon appeared on Lee Young-ji's web entertainment show Not Much Prepared. This episode surpassed five million views within four days of being released, as well as ranked first on YouTube's most popular video in South Korea for three days in a row. He also became a hot topic in social media platforms for his visual and humor.

Hyungwon started producing and working on external songs, as he composed, wrote, and arranged for AB6IX's song "Complicated", from the group's sixth EP Take a Chance. He also composed, wrote, and arranged two songs, "Bad Liar" and "Where Is This Love", for fellow group member Kihyun's first EP Youth. Hyungwon participated as a producer in the American sports-themed beverage and food products brand Gatorade's campaign advertisement music (featuring Yuna Kim and Lee Dong-gook). He produced the Peak Time winner Vanner's song "Want U Back", from the group's first EP Veni Vidi Vici.

== Other ventures ==
=== Ambassadorship ===
In November 2021, as part of Monsta X's promotional campaign for traditional Korean culture, Hyungwon and Minhyuk participated in a video narration for the YouTube series Kimchi Universe 3, jointly produced by Daesang Jonggajib and World Kimchi Research Institute together with Professor Seo Kyung-duk of Sungshin Women's University. The video explains how kimchi became known all over the world through the 1986 Asian Games and 1988 Seoul Olympics, culminating with Gimjang, the traditional practice of preparing and preserving kimchi, being registered on the UNESCO Intangible Cultural Heritage of Humanity in 2013.

In September 2026, it was announced that he had been selected as a global ambassador for Concept Korea, hosted by the Ministry of Culture, Sports and Tourism and organized by the Korea Creative Content Agency. Founded in 2010, it is an initiative made by the Korean government to support young, local designers on an international level and spotlights the most interesting names in South Korean fashion. In October, Hyungwon will represent it during the 2027 S/S Paris Fashion Week.

=== Endorsements ===
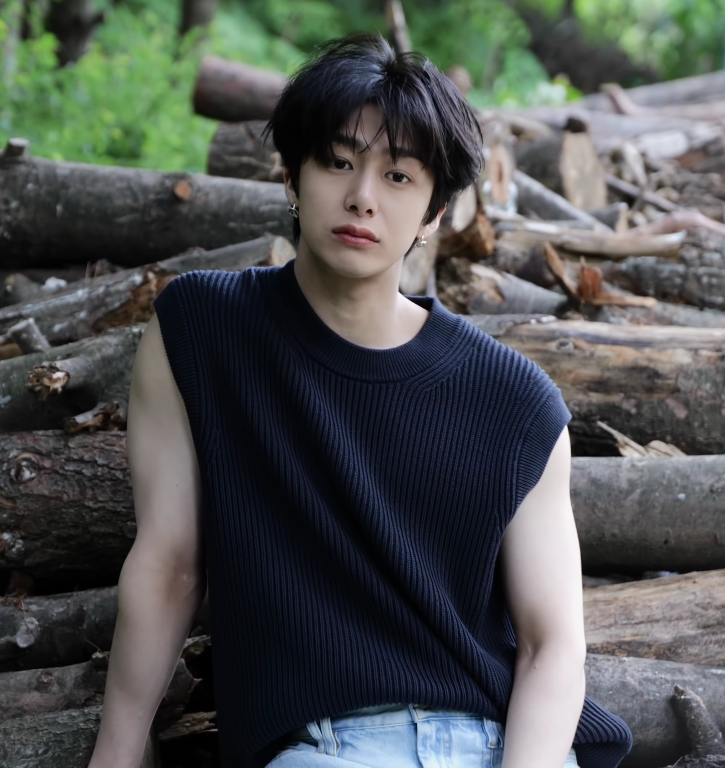
Hyungwon for Marie Claire Korea in June 2021

In July 2019, Hyungwon and VIXX's Hongbin were chosen as the Korean representatives for the global beverage brand Pepsi's "The Love of Summer" campaign.

In July 2021, he participated in Pepsi's "Taste of Korea" summer campaign, alongside Monsta X members' Shownu and I.M, together with Rain, Brave Girls members' Yujeong and Yuna, and Ateez members' Hongjoong and Yunho. On July 19, Hyungwon was chosen by the Korean cosmetics brand Wellage as its new model through the Korean star and style magazine AtStyle.

In July 2022, he became the model for the French premium mineral water brand Evian, which also launched a limited edition collection with the beagle character Snoopy through the men's magazine Esquire Korea. In August, Hyungwon promoted the French skincare brand Avène's cleanser through the Korean fashion, beauty, and life magazine Singles. In October, he became the model for the American denim jeans brand Lee's winter collection through the fashion magazine W Korea. On November 6, Hyungwon had renewed his model contract for Wellage.

In April 2023, he became the global brand ambassador for the American men's lifestyle brand John Varvatos' perfume line through the men's magazine GQ Korea. On August 21, the French luxury beauty brand Givenchy Beauty had selected Hyungwon as its new model for Parfums Givenchy through the Korean fashion, beauty, and life magazine Singles. In September, he promoted the American fashion brand Denim Tears' seasonal collection, in collaboration with the American denim jeans brand Levi's through the lifestyle magazine Dazed Korea.

In July 2025, Hyungwon graced the June issue cover of the premium Chinese travel and lifestyle magazine The Traveler, being the first Korean artist selected as its cover model. In November, he became a model for the Korean skincare brand Celimax, alongside group member Kihyun.

In June 2026, Hyungwon became a model for the Korean sunglasses brand RECLOW, participating in "The New Frame" campaign.

=== Philanthropy ===
In January 2022, Hyungwon donated ₩500,000 through the idol fandom community service My Favorite Idol for his birthday. It will be delivered to the Miral Welfare Foundation and used as a fund for the disabled who were isolated due to COVID-19. In March, he donated ₩10,000,000 through Yeouldol, a non-profit organization that helps children with rare diseases, alongside Wellage. On October 28, Hyungwon attended the fashion magazine W Korea's breast cancer awareness campaign "Love Your W" charity event, alongside group member Minhyuk, held at the Four Seasons Hotel in Gwanghwamun, Seoul.

In February 2023, he joined in the cover project for fashion magazine Marie Claire Korea's "Happy Marie Birthday" campaign, to support UNICEF's drinking water sanitation project and Save the Children's psychological and emotional support project for domestic and foreign abused children and those children exposed to various risks, in celebration of its 30th anniversary, with the French jewelry and watch brand Fred.

In January 2024, Hyungwon donated ₩1,150,000 to Sanggawon, a disability welfare corporation which operates in a total of sixteen affiliated organizations, including Seunggawon Happy Village, a residential facility for disabled children and Mercy Welfare Town, a residential facility for adults with disabilities, in participation of its "Very Special Today, Fan Club Sponsorship" campaign for lifelong life, self-reliance support, and rehabilitation treatment of the disabled in South Korea through his fanbase, in commemoration of his birthday. He also donated iPad to Chonnam National University Hwasun Hospital through an anonymous fan, with the help of Donation Angel, which will be given to children and adolescents receiving inpatient and outpatient treatment, in commemoration of his birthday.

== Discography ==
=== Singles ===
==== As lead artist ====
List of singles, showing year released and album name
Title	Year	Album
"Interstellar" (with Jooheon and I.M feat. Yella Diamond)	2015	Trespass

==== Promotional singles ====
List of promotional singles, showing year released, chart positions and album name
Title	Year	Peak chart positions	Album
Title	Year	KOR DL	Album
"Cool Love" (Prod. dress) (Note: "Cool Love" was released as a promotional single in collaboration with Pepsi.) (with Hongbin)	2019	—	The Love of Summer: The Performance
"Summer Taste" (Note: "Summer Taste" was released as a promotional single in collaboration with Pepsi.) (with Rain, Shownu, I.M, Yujeong and Yuna (Brave Girls), and Hongjoong and Yunho (Ateez))	2021	54	Taste of Korea
"—" denotes releases that did not chart or were not released in that region.

=== Soundtrack appearances ===
Title	Year	Album	Artist(s)	Ref.
"Picture"	2021	Fly Again OST Part 1	Hyungwon	
"Now"	2023	CEO-dol Mart OST Part 4	Hyungwon	

=== Other appearances ===
Title	Year	Album	Artist(s)	Ref.
"BAM!BAM!BAM!"	2017	Non-album single	DJ H.ONE and Justin Oh feat. Jooheon	
"1(One)"	2017	Mix and the City OST Part 2	DJ H.ONE feat. Jooheon and Kriz	
"Just One More" (Prod. Cash Cash)	2017	Mix and the City OST Part 4	DJ H.ONE, Jessi, Hyomin, Tritops, Jimin, and Xie	
"My Name"	2018	Non-album single	DJ H.ONE and Jimmy Clash feat. Talksick	

=== Music videos ===
Title	Year	Artist	Director	Ref.
"Cool Love"	2019	Hyungwon and Hongbin (VIXX)	Choi Young-ji (PinkLabel Visual)	
"Summer Taste"	2021	Hyungwon, Rain, Shownu, I.M, Yujeong and Yuna (Brave Girls), and Hongjoong and Yunho (Ateez)	Choi Young-ji (PinkLabel Visual)	

== Filmography ==
=== Film ===
Year	Title	Role	Note	Ref.
2026	Grim Reaper Life Extension Project	Jun-ho	Short film	

=== Television series ===
Year	Title	Role	Note	Ref.
2023	Oh! Youngsim	Han Yo-han	Special appearance	

=== Web series ===
Year	Title	Role	Note	Ref.
2017	Please Find Her	Jeon Ik-soo	Supporting role	
2021	Kimchi Universe 3	Video Narrator	with Minhyuk	
2021	Fly Again	Han Yo-han	Main role	
2023	CEO-dol Mart	Jo Yi-jun	Main role	

=== Television shows ===
Year	Title	Role	Note	Ref.
2014–2015	No.Mercy	Contestant	4th member announced as part of Monsta X	
2017	Mix and the City	Cast	as DJ H.ONE	
2020	Hidden Singer	Panelist	with Kihyun for Season 6 (Episode 5)	
2021	Street Dance Girls Fighter	Special Judge	with Joohoney and I.M	
2023	Inkigayo	Special MC	with Kim Ji-eun	
2025	B:My Boyz	Special Judge	with Shownu and Kihyun (Episode 3)	

=== Web shows ===
Year	Title	Role	Note	Ref.
2021–2022	Inssa Oppa	Cast	Season 5 and Season 6	
2022	X: New World	Cast	Season 2	
2023	Chae's Drift	MC	Season 1	
2025–2026	Ttorora	Cast	with Lee Chang-sub and Solar	

=== Radio shows ===
Year	Title	Role	Note	Ref.
2021–2022	Idol Radio	DJ	with Joohoney for Season 2	

=== Events ===
Year	Event	Role	Note	Ref.
2025	Asia Star Entertainer Awards	MC	with Kim Hye-yoon and Younghoon (The Boyz)	
2026	Asia Star Entertainer Awards	MC	with Rei (Ive)	

=== Music video appearances ===
Year	Title	Artist	Note	Ref.
2016	"You Call It Romance"	K.Will	with Yoon Ye-joo and Choi Won-myeong	

== Songwriting ==
All credits are adapted from the Korea Music Copyright Association, unless stated otherwise.

Year	Artist(s)	Song	Album	Lyrics		Music		Arrangement	
Year	Artist(s)	Song	Album	Credited	With	Credited	With	Credited	With
2017	DJ H.ONE X Justin Oh feat. Jooheon	"BAM!BAM!BAM!"	Non-album single	No	N/A	Yes	Justin Oh	No	N/A
2017	DJ H.ONE feat. Kriz and Jooheon	"1(One)"	Mix and the City Pt. 2	No	N/A	Yes	Justin Oh, Kriz	No	N/A
2018	DJ H.ONE X Jimmy Clash feat. Talksick	"My Name"	Non-album single	No	N/A	Yes	Jimmy Clash, Elke Tiel, Stas Swaczyna	No	N/A
2019	Monsta X feat. French Montana	"Who Do U Love?"	All About Luv	Yes	French Montana, Monsta X, Torrey Jake, Conrad Noah Patrick, Henig Daniel Doron	Yes	French Montana, Monsta X, Torrey Jake, Conrad Noah Patrick, Henig Daniel Doron	No	N/A
2019	Monsta X	"Middle of the Night"	All About Luv	No	N/A	Yes	Monsta X, Ali Payami, Mitchell John Lathrop	No	N/A
2020	Monsta X feat. Pitbull	"Beside U"	All About Luv	No	N/A	Yes	Pitbull, Monsta X, Angel Lopez, Daniel Ryan Winsch, Eshy Gazit, Federico Vindver, Timothy Mosley	No	N/A
2020	Monsta X	"Nobody Else"	Fatal Love	Yes	Jantine Annika Heij, I.M, Justin Oh	Yes	Jantine Annika Heij	Yes	Jantine Annika Heij
2021	Monsta X	"Secrets"	One of a Kind	Yes	Jantine Annika Heij, Joohoney, I.M, Justin Oh	Yes	Justin Oh, Jantine Annika Heij	Yes	Justin Oh, Jantine Annika Heij
2021	Monsta X	"Bebe"	One of a Kind	Yes		No	N/A	No	N/A
2021	Monsta X	"Mercy"	No Limit	Yes	Jantine Annika Heij, Joohoney, I.M, Justin Oh	Yes	Justin Oh, Jantine Annika Heij	Yes	Justin Oh, Jantine Annika Heij
2022	Monsta X	"Wildfire"	Shape of Love	Yes	Jantine Annika Heij, Joohoney, I.M, Justin Oh	Yes	Jantine Annika Heij, Joohoney, I.M, Justin Oh	No	N/A
2022	Hyungwon	"Wildfire"	Shape of Love	Yes	Jantine Annika Heij, Justin Oh	Yes	Jantine Annika Heij, Justin Oh	No	N/A
2022	Monsta X feat. R3hab	"Burning Up"	Shape of Love	Yes	Jantine Annika Heij, Justin Oh, R3hab	Yes	Jantine Annika Heij, Justin Oh, R3hab	No	N/A
2022	AB6IX	"Complicated"	Take a Chance	Yes	Jantine Annika Heij, Justin Oh, Park Woo-jin	Yes	Justin Oh, Jantine Annika Heij	Yes	Justin Oh
2022	Kihyun	"Bad Liar"	Youth	Yes	Jantine Annika Heij, Justin Oh	Yes	Justin Oh, Jantine Annika Heij	Yes	Justin Oh
2022	Kihyun	"Where Is This Love"	Youth	Yes	Jantine Annika Heij, Justin Oh	Yes	Justin Oh, Jantine Annika Heij	Yes	Justin Oh
2023	Monsta X	"Beautiful Liar"	Reason	Yes	Joohoney, I.M, Brother Su, Kim Eung-ju	No	N/A	No	N/A
2023	Monsta X	"Lone Ranger"	Reason	Yes	Joohoney, I.M, Jantine Annika Heij, Justin Oh	Yes	Justin Oh, Jantine Annika Heij, Britt Pols	Yes	Justin Oh
2023	Shownu X Hyungwon	"Love Me a Little"	The Unseen	Yes	Justin Oh, Jantine Annika Heij, Rudi Zygadlo	Yes	Justin Oh, Jantine Annika Heij, Rudi Zygadlo	Yes	Justin Oh
2023	Shownu X Hyungwon	"Roll with Me"	The Unseen	Yes	Justin Oh, Roel Rats, Marcia "Misha Angèle" Sondeijker, Jim van Hooff	Yes	Justin Oh, Roel Rats	Yes	Justin Oh
2023	Vanner	"Want U Back"	Veni Vidi Vici	Yes	Justin Oh, Jantine Annika Heij, Gon, Sungkook	Yes	Justin Oh, Jantine Annika Heij	Yes	Justin Oh
2025	Monsta X	"Fire & Ice"	The X	Yes	Justin Oh, Jantine Annika Heij, Michele Carmine Dato, Tancrede Rouff	Yes	Justin Oh, Jantine Annika Heij, Michele Carmine Dato, Tancrede Rouff	Yes	Justin Oh, Jantine Annika Heij, Michele Carmine Dato, Tancrede Rouff
2025	Monsta X and DJ H.ONE	"N the Front (H.ONE remix)"	The X	No	N/A	No	N/A	Yes	Justin Oh
2026	Shownu X Hyungwon	"Superstitious"	Love Me	Yes	Justin Oh, Jantine Annika Heij	Yes	Justin Oh, Jantine Annika Heij	Yes	Justin Oh, Jantine Annika Heij
2026	Shownu X Hyungwon	"In My Head"	Love Me	Yes	Justin Oh, Jantine Annika Heij	Yes	Justin Oh, Jantine Annika Heij	Yes	Justin Oh, Jantine Annika Heij
2026	Shownu X Hyungwon	"Accelerator"	Love Me	Yes	Justin Oh, Jantine Annika Heij, Jake Tench, Jessica Grace Kent	Yes	Justin Oh, Jantine Annika Heij, Jake Tench, Jessica Grace Kent	Yes	Justin Oh, Jantine Annika Heij, Jake Tench, Jessica Grace Kent
2026	Shownu X Hyungwon	"No Air (Hyungwon solo)"	Love Me	Yes	Justin Oh, Jantine Annika Heij	Yes	Justin Oh, Jantine Annika Heij	No	N/A

== Awards and nominations ==
Name of the award ceremony, year presented, category, recipient of the award and the result of the nomination
Award ceremony	Year	Category	Recipient	Result	Ref.
Blue Dragon Series Awards	2022	Best Actor Award	Fly Again	Shortlisted	
Blue Dragon Series Awards	2022	Popularity Award	Fly Again	Nominated	
