= Shownu =

South Korean singer

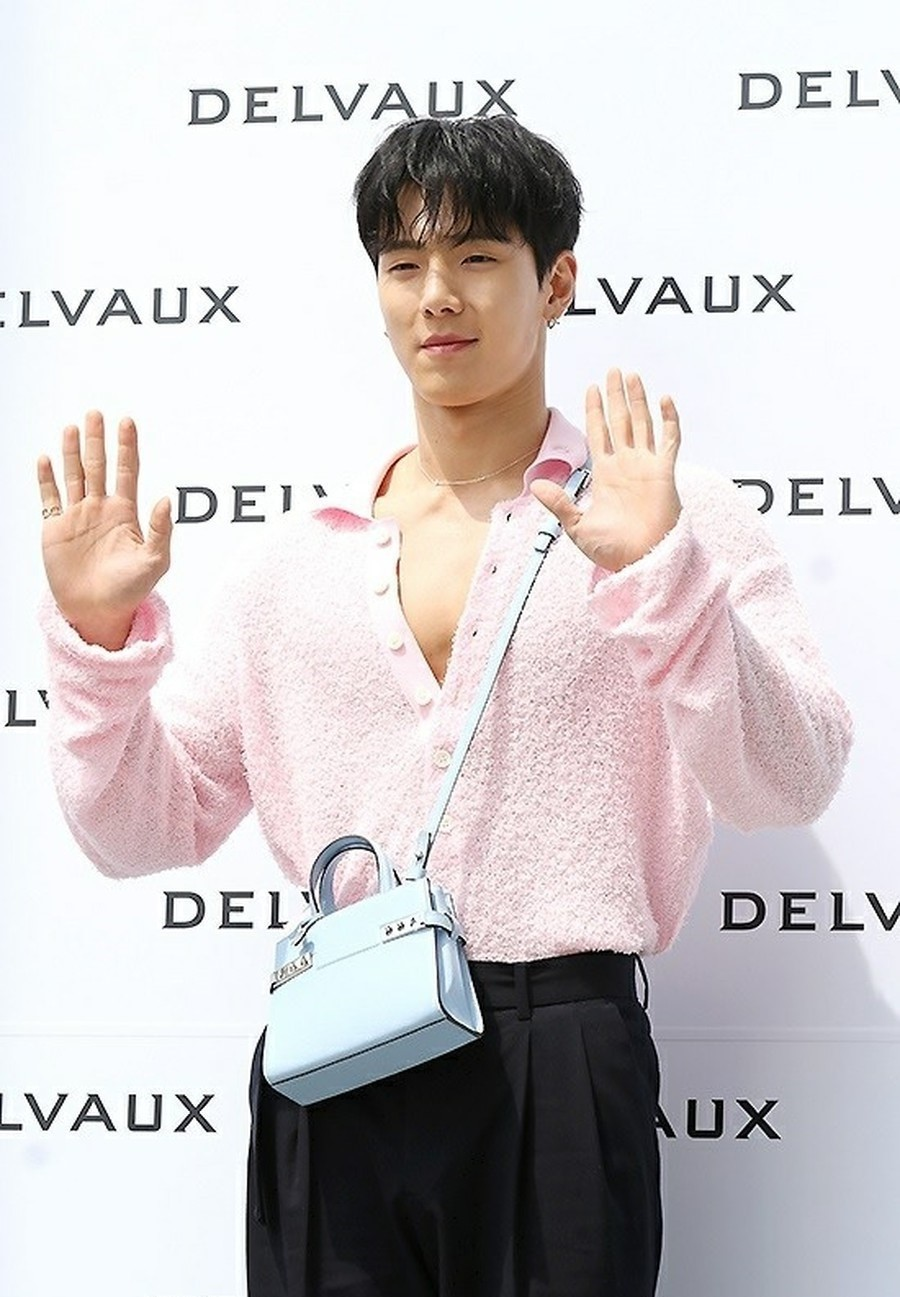
- Shownu in 2023
- Born: Son Hyun-woo; June 18, 1992 (age 34); Seoul, South Korea
- Occupations: Singer; dancer; actor
- Musical career
- Genre: K-pop
- Instrument: Vocals
- Years active: 2011–present
- Label: Starship
- Member of: Monsta X; Shownu X Hyungwon

Korean name
- Hangul: 손현우
- RR: Son Hyeonu
- MR: Son Hyŏnu

Stage name
- Hangul: 셔누
- RR: Syeonu
- MR: Syŏnu

Signature
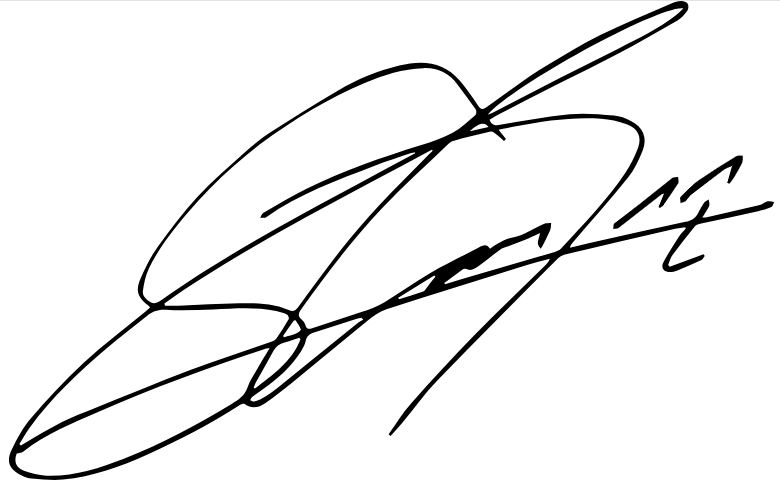

Son Hyun-woo (Korean: 손현우, born June 18, 1992), known professionally as Shownu, is a South Korean singer, dancer, and actor. He is a member of South Korean boy group Monsta X and its sub-unit Shownu X Hyungwon under Starship Entertainment.

== Career ==
=== Early life and pre-debut ===
Shownu was born in Chang-dong, Dobong-gu in Seoul, South Korea on June 18, 1992.

He was initially a trainee of JYP Entertainment, for about two years, after winning first place in the JYP auditions in 2009. Shownu auditioned for JYP Entertainment, as it had been the company of the singer Rain, who inspired him to become an idol. He also gained praise from the company for his dancing skills but still decided to leave, citing "conflicts with the company" and "feeling of stagnation".

Shownu continued to participate in the idol industry, becoming the backup dancer of Lee Hyori and doing promotions with her, as well as appearing in the music videos for "Bad Girls" and "Going Crazy". He also appeared in the music videos, such as "Talk to My Face" by D-Unit and "Pitapat" by Bestie.

After Shownu auditioned and joined Starship Entertainment, he became part of the project group Nu Boyz, alongside Monsta X members' Joohoney and Wonho, as well as #Gun.

In December 2014, Shownu competed in Mnet's survival reality show No.Mercy and debuted in the hip-hop boy group Monsta X, alongside the other six contestants, in 2015.

=== 2015–2017: Debut in Monsta X and solo activities ===
He debuted as the leader and main dancer of Monsta X, with the EP Trespass, on May 14, 2015.

Since debut, Shownu had made significant solo appearances on variety and reality shows, including being a regular cast member for two seasons of Lipstick Prince, which landed him a commercial film after winning the show, as well as appearing as a contestant on King of Mask Singer in 2018, as "Okey Donkey", while guesting for more than ten variety shows. He also appeared in Sistar's "Shake It" music video.

In June 2016, Shownu made his first solo appearance in a magazine for InStyle Korea.

=== 2018–2021: Solo appearances and other solo activities ===
In January, he was selected to host the Korean-Japanese music show The Power of K, alongside Block B's U-Kwon and Momoland's Nancy, which was broadcast simultaneously in Korea and Japan.

On October 26, Shownu collaborated with the British band PREP's lead single "Don't Look Back", for their forthcoming album, alongside Hwang So-yoon of Se So Neon. Shownu had sought out PREP for collaboration as he was already a fan of the group. He also appeared in magazines with member Wonho for Nylon Korea in January, GQ Korea in August, and in October for Dazed Korea. Shownu also made a solo appearance in Taiwanese magazine Bella in February.

In 2019, he was again featured in a magazine alongside Wonho, for Elle Korea in August, as well as on the cover of BEAUTY+ in October and again in November 2020.

Shownu is a credited writer on "Mirror" from Follow: Find You, and as a writer and composer on three of Monsta X's tracks from their sixth studio album All About Luv; including "Who Do U Love?" featuring French Montana, "Middle of the Night", and "Beside U" featuring Pitbull. Shownu also co-wrote "Someone's Someone", alongside the Before You Exit members.

In 2020, prior to the release of Monsta X's eighth EP Fantasia X, he injured his back, and the group delayed their comeback by two weeks to allow Shownu time to heal properly from his injury. Prior to the group's live-streamed concert "Live From Seoul with Luv", scheduled for July 25, he had to undergo emergency left eye retinal detachment surgery, and then the concert was postponed to August 8, to give Shownu the time to recover from surgery. He featured alongside Monsta X members in magazines several times in 2020, including appearing alongside Minhyuk and Joohoney for Harper's Bazaar Korea in May, Kihyun for W Korea in June, and with Joohoney for Esquire Korea in November.

In August, it was announced he would be featuring on the soundtrack for She's My Type, alongside group member Minhyuk, marking his first soundtrack appearance, independent of Monsta X, since 2011. The song is titled "Have a Goodnight", and was released on September 11. On October 15, Shownu released a rock-style song for the soundtrack of the Korean television drama Tale of the Nine Tailed, titled "I'll Be There".

In October, he had a solo feature in Dazed Korea for Monsta X Dazed Project, GQ Korea for a fashion film, and appeared on the back cover of 1st Look Magazine Korea.

In November, Shownu began appearing as a judge on Mnet's survival reality show Cap-Teen, making him the youngest judge on the show.

In March 2021, Shownu appeared in Elle Korea, as well as in Dazed Korea. Shownu with Monsta X member Minhyuk were chosen as the cover models for the first issue of Y Magazine Korea. Shownu was invited to the grand opening of the Dolce & Gabbana store, held in Gangnam-gu, Seoul. On March 17, it was announced that he would become part of the horror film Urban Myths.

On May 4, Starship announced that he would be taking a hiatus from Monsta X and would not promote for their upcoming comeback due to health problems related to his eye retinal detachment.

In July, Shownu with other Monsta X members' Hyungwon and I.M joined the Pepsi's "Taste of Korea" summer campaign, releasing a promotional single "Summer Taste", alongside Rain, Brave Girls members' Yujeong and Yuna, and Ateez members' Hongjoong and Yunho.

=== 2023–present: Continued solo activities and sub-unit debut ===
In May, he attended an event commemorating the renewal of the Delvaux's store, held in Gangnam-gu, Seoul.

In June, Shownu was announced to join as a judge on Mnet's dance competition show Street Woman Fighter 2, starting on August 22. He also graced the cover for July issue of Singles. On June 21, Shownu attended the Korea launching party event of SimiHaze Beauty, held in Gangnam-gu, Seoul. On June 29, he appeared at the pop-up opening event of TAG Heuer's "Iconic Collection Carrera", with Hyungwon, in commemoration of its 60th anniversary, held in Gangnam-gu, Seoul.

On July 25, Shownu formed Monsta X's first official sub-unit Shownu X Hyungwon, along with Hyungwon. The duo released their debut EP The Unseen, with the lead single "Love Me a Little". He participated in the choreography.

In August, Shownu had graced the cover of Allure Korea's September issue.

On September 8, he attended the launch event of Canada Goose's "Live in the Open" F/W collection, in collaboration with Rok Hwang and Matt McCormick, held in Seongdong-gu, Seoul. On September 14, Shownu attended the launch event of Calvin Klein's capsule collection, in collaboration with Son Heung-min, held in Yeongdeungpo-gu, Seoul. The brand hosted its Fall 2023 Calvin Klein Jeans' collection event, celebrating fashion and music, where he also attended on October 19, held in Tokyo. On September 26, Shownu attended the Aspesi's pop-up store opening, held in Yeongdeungpo-gu, Seoul.

On October 23, he attended the launch event of Hermès' "Please Check In" S/S collection, held in Seoul.

On November 8, Shownu attended the launch event of Boucheron 2023 Carte Blanche's "More is More" exhibition, held in Gangnam-gu, Seoul. He was a special guest for 2023 Fuerza Bruta Wayra in Seoul on November 26, December 1, and December 3, with four additional appearances.

On December 1, Shownu attended the launch event of Swarovski's flagship store, held at Dosan Park in Seoul.

In January 2024, he attended the launch event of Marni's special capsule collection, in collaboration with YK Jeong, held in Gangnam-gu, Seoul. Shownu was also chosen to be part of Natasha, Pierre & The Great Comet of 1812, playing the role of Anatole, the aristocratic and seductive hedonist, charming and attractive officer who captivates women in an instant, and narcissist who enjoys women and alcohol, which will run from March 26 to June 16.

On February 28, he attended the launch event of MAC Cosmetics' MACximal Silky Matte Lipstick pop-up store, held at Lotte World Atrium Square in Songpa-gu, Seoul.

In June, it was announced that Shownu will host a new web variety show Nopogy, alongside NCT 127's Jungwoo.

In July, he appeared on KBS2's reality competition program Make Mate 1 as a surprise advisor of the team that performed Monsta X's "Love Killa".

In April 2025, Shownu had a surprise collaboration with world-renowned DJ and producer Steve Aoki at the 2025 EDC Korea.

On October 24, he participated in the soundtrack for TVING's dating reality show Transit Love Season 4, titled "As You Wish".

In May 2026, it was announced that Shownu's solo song "Around & Go", which he performed at The X: Nexus World Tour, will be included in his sub-unit's second EP Love Me. Shownu also participated in the overall choreography of the lead single "Do You Love Me". In November, it was announced that he will temporarily suspend his activities due to disc herniation.

== Personal life ==
Shownu was a swimmer for six years and had participated in the provincial championships. He also practiced veganism.

=== Military service ===
Shownu enlisted for his mandatory military service and served as public service worker due to previous surgery for left eye retinal detachment on July 22, 2021. He was officially discharged from military on April 21, 2023.

== Artistry ==
=== Musical style and influences ===
As the lead vocalist of Monsta X, Shownu has been described to possess "cool singing ability", "soft voice", and "appealing singing method". He also has been described to possess "comfortable and simple tone", with "stable voice tone" and "singing style that goes well with pop songs".

Shownu has cited singer and actor Rain, as well as international artists Michael Jackson, Chris Brown, and Bruno Mars as his role models.

=== Dance style and approach ===
He is known for his signature powerful movements, incorporating a balance of "fast movement patterns" and "intense actions". His style involves "highly focused expressions" rather than "excessive gestures".

== Public image and impact ==
Shownu had been described as an "all-round artist" and was dubbed as the "Next Generation Beastly Idol". He had also appeared on various South Korean entertainment programs and received praise for his muscular body, charisma, and charm.

Besides being the main dancer of Monsta X, Shownu also contributed to the group's choreography and had been praised for his skills by fellow choreographers. He had released his own choreography of Ariana Grande's "Side to Side", Richard Parker's "Psychic", Charlie Puth's "LA Girls", Trevor Daniel's "Falling", and the Weeknd's "Heartless", while created the choreography of Bruno Mars' "Versace on the Floor" and Monsta X's "Mirror" that were performed at the group's world tours.

Shownu appeared on the cover of Cosmopolitan Korea for its 20th anniversary issue and became sold out as soon as the sales began. After the 1st Look Magazine Korea's release, Moschino perfume's Toy 2 sold out at Olive Young's online mall and also ranked first in perfume brand ranking, branding it as "Shownu's perfume". After his appearance for Fuerza Bruta Wayra in Seoul, its official SNS increased by 100%, with the number of followers reached almost two million, and it recorded more than 260,000 new attendees. Shownu's appearance for New York Fashion Week also recorded the highest number of views online among all its fashion shows.

He was consistently placed in Tumblr's "Most Popular K-pop Stars", ranking 49th in 2018, 40th in 2019, 48th in 2020, and 66th in 2021, as well as in "Individual Boy Group Members Brand Power Ranking" published by the Korean Corporate Reputation Research Institute, with the highest ranking at 13th in November 2019.

Entertainer Lee Eun-ji, Olympic medalist boxer Im Ae-ji, and comedian Park Na-rae are fans of Shownu.

== Other ventures ==
=== Ambassadorship ===
In October 2020, as part of Monsta X's promotional campaign for traditional culture of Korea, Shownu participated for Hangul Day's "Easy Korean, Correct Korean" campaign video, with Seo Kyung-duk, a famous Korean promoter who teaches at Sungshin Women's University. This four-minute video, produced by the Ministry of Culture, Sports and Tourism and the Federation of Korean Language and Culture Centers, was also created with an animation technique, under the theme of "COVID-19-related public language", that can be easily understood by anyone, regardless of age or gender.

In January 2024, he was chosen as 2024 F/W Concept Korea's global ambassador, while being its runway model for New York Fashion Week on February 13, which was hosted by the Ministry of Culture, Sports and Tourism and organized by the Korea Creative Content Agency. Founded in 2010, it is an initiative by the Korean government that supports young, local designers on an international level and spotlights the most interesting names in South Korean fashion. In September, Shownu represented Concept Korea during the 2025 S/S Paris Fashion Week. In October 2026, he will represent it during the 2027 S/S Paris Fashion Week.

=== Endorsements ===
In October 2018, Shownu and Monsta X member Wonho promoted the American sportswear brand Under Armour's shoe and clothing line through Dazed Korea.

In August 2019, Shownu and Wonho promoted the American luxury fashion brand Tom Ford's latest perfume line through Elle Korea.

In October 2020, Shownu promoted Moschino's Toy Boy perfume through 1st Look Magazine Korea. Following its promotional success, he was chosen as the first Korean muse by the Italian luxury fashion brand Moschino perfume. Shownu also appeared in a fashion film promoting Under Armour.

In March 2021, Shownu promoted Moschino's Toy 2 Bubble Gum perfume through Elle Korea. He also promoted the American sports equipment brand Brooks Sports' shoe and clothing line through Dazed Korea. In July, Shownu, along with other Monsta X members' Hyungwon and I.M, joined the global beverage brand Pepsi's "Taste of Korea" summer campaign, besides Rain, Brave Girls members' Yujeong and Yuna, and Ateez members' Hongjoong and Yunho. The same month, he also promoted the premium luggage brand Rimowa through W Korea, with Monsta X member Minhyuk. On July 19, the Korean lifestyle and cosmetics brand Round A'Round chose Shownu as an advertising model. Before his enlistment, he joined digital shows for 2022 S/S menswear collection by the Italian luxury fashion brand Prada and the British luxury fashion brand Burberry.

In May 2023, Shownu promoted the Italian luxury fashion brand Dolce & Gabbana's classic shoe and clothing line, bags, and accessories through Vogue Korea. The same month, he attended and participated in its "DG Logo Bag" launching event and campaign. In June, Shownu promoted the French luxury fashion brands Louis Vuitton's Pre-Fall collection and Dior's Beige Wool collection, besides the Italian luxury fashion brands Ferragamo's Pre-Fall collection and Valentino's Rockstud collection through Singles. On August 16, he collaborated with Ferragamo, promoting its F/W collection through Allure Korea. On August 17, Shownu was chosen by the Korean skincare brand I'm from as its new muse, carrying out its "Rain Project", in celebration of its 10th anniversary. On August 18, he was chosen by Lotte Wellfood as an advertising model for Lotte's Bugles-like snack brand Kko Kkal Corn.

In January 2024, Shownu promoted Lotte Chilsung Beverage's beer brand Kloud Krush through Dazed Korea. On February 14, the Korean designer label Kimmy.J named him during New York Fashion Week as its muse and the inspiration of its newest collection through Teen Vogue. On June 5, he was chosen by the American multinational fast food chain McDonald's as its global campaign model. In August, Shownu became the global ambassador of the French fashion brand K-Way, promoting its 2024 F/W collection. He also represented the brand during the 2025 F/W Milan Fashion Week.

In May 2025, Shownu collaborated with the Korean clothing brand Time Homme through Vogue Korea, promoting its lounge wear collection. On October 31, he took part in the Korean clothing brand Discovery Expedition's "Active Wellness Rave" campaign, presenting the brand direction for a healthy and active lifestyle.

=== Philanthropy ===
In April 2019, Shownu reached a donation of ₩9,276,000 through the Korean television program My Little Television V2, 1.6 times more than the original goal of ₩5,000,000, with Kang Boo-ja, Kim Gu-ra, Jeong Hyeong-don, Kim Dong-hyun, and Kim Poong, wherein the donations they collected were used where each help was needed.

In June 2021, he donated ₩500,000 through the idol fandom community service My Favorite Idol, in celebration of his birthday. It will be delivered to the Miral Welfare Foundation and used as a fund for the disabled who are isolated due to COVID-19.

In June 2022, Shownu donated ₩1,000,000 through the idol fandom community service My Favorite Idol, in celebration of his birthday. The donation will be delivered again to the Miral Welfare Foundation and used as an emergency relief fund for Ukrainian refugees who are suffering from war.

In November 2023, he launched a donation campaign "By My Side, Bee My Side" through the Korean skincare brand I'm from, with ₩5,000,000 of sales proceeds be donated to WWF to help create a bee habitat. It was also designed to raise awareness of the value and importance of bees, as approximately ten billion bees have been missing for the past years due to destruction of their habitats caused by pesticides and air pollution. On November 24, Shownu participated in a charity event for the fashion magazine W Korea's breast cancer awareness campaign "Love Your W".

In October 2024, he participated in a charity event for the fashion magazine W Korea's breast cancer awareness campaign "Love Your W".

=== Production ===
Shownu participated as a reader of Edgar Allan Poe's Annabelle Lee and William Wordsworth's My Heart Leaps Up through the Naver's audio-only platform Audio Clip, alongside group member I.M, with the release of an interview video, a video of reading a book, audiobook recording site sketches, and a collection of NGs on Naver V Live Plus, to help the visually impaired people.

== Discography ==
=== Singles ===
==== As featured artist ====
List of singles as featured artist, showing year released, chart positions and album name
Title	Year	Peak chart positions	Album
Title	Year	KOR	Album
"Don't Look Back" (PREP feat. Shownu and So!YoON!)	2018	—	Line by Line
"—" denotes releases that did not chart or were not released in that region.

==== Promotional singles ====
List of promotional singles, showing year released, chart positions and album name
Title	Year	Peak chart positions	Album
Title	Year	KOR	Album
"Summer Taste" (Note: "Summer Taste" was released as a promotional single in collaboration with Pepsi.) (with Rain, Hyungwon, I.M, Yujeong and Yuna (Brave Girls), and Hongjoong and Yunho (Ateez))	2021	— (Note: "Summer Taste" did not enter on the Digital Chart but appeared at number 54 on the component Download Chart.)	Taste of Korea
"—" denotes releases that did not chart or were not released in that region.

=== Soundtrack appearances ===
Title	Year	Album	Artist(s)	Ref.
"Now We Know Why"	2011	Protect the Boss OST Part 8	Son Hyun-woo (Note: He was credited as such, as this predates his debut with the stage name Shownu.)	
"Have a Goodnight"	2020	She's My Type OST Part 6	Shownu and Minhyuk	
"I'll Be There"	2020	Tale of the Nine Tailed OST Part 2	Shownu	
"As You Wish"	2025	Transit Love Season 4 OST Part 3	Shownu	

=== Music videos ===
Title	Year	Artist	Director	Ref.
"Summer Taste"	2021	Shownu, Rain, Hyungwon, I.M, Yujeong and Yuna (Brave Girls), and Hongjoong and Yunho (Ateez)	Choi Young-ji (PinkLabel Visual)	

== Filmography ==
=== Film ===
Year	Title	Role	Note	Ref.
2022	Urban Myths	Lee Jong-chan	Segment: "A Mannequin"	

=== Television series ===
Year	Title	Role	Notes	Ref.
2018	Dae Jang Geum Is Watching	Himself	Special appearance	

=== Television shows ===
Year	Show	Role	Note	Ref.
2014–2015	No.Mercy	Contestant	2nd member announced as part of Monsta X	
2015	Our Neighborhood Arts and Physical Education	Contestant	for Swimming (Episode 114)	
2016	Law of the Jungle in Papua New Guinea	Cast	June 3–24 (Episode 216–219)	
2016	Running Man	Contestant	with Sistar (Episode 307)	
2016	Lipstick Prince	Cast	Season 1	
2016	Hit the Stage	Contestant	Season 1 (Episode 1–2, 5–8, and 10)	
2017	Lipstick Prince	Cast	Season 2	
2017	History Repletion: Oh! Cool Guys	Cast	with Kim Sung-joo, Ahn Jung-hwan, Han Sang-jin, and Jo Se-ho	
2018	The Power of K	Host	with U-Kwon and Nancy	
2018	King of Mask Singer	Contestant	as "Okidoki" (Episode 137)	
2018	Real Man 300	Cast	as part of the "White Skull" unit	
2019	My Little Television V2	Cast	Shownu's Gym Home Training (Episode 1–2)	
2020	Hidden Singer	Contestant	Season 6 (Episode 5)	
2020	Cap-Teen	Judge	with Lee Seung-chul, Jessi, and Soyou	
2021	Hungry For Delivery? Order it First!	Cast	with Shin Dong-yup, Hyun Joo-yup, Joon Park, and Lee Kyu-han	
2023	Street Woman Fighter 2	Judge	with Monika	
2024	Make Mate 1	Advisor	Episode 9	
2025	Stars' Top Recipe at Fun-Staurant	Competing Chef	with Joohoney (Episode 271–273)	
2025	B:My Boyz	Special Judge	with Kihyun and Hyungwon (Episode 3)	

=== Web shows ===
Year	Show	Role	Note	Ref.
2019	Yum-Yum Yum-Yum	Host	Season 1	
2024	Nopogy	Host	with Jungwoo	
2025	Debut's Plan	Special Trainer	Episode 0	

=== Music video appearances ===
Year	Title	Artist	Note	Ref.
2013	"Talk to My Face"	D-Unit	as Son Hyun-woo	
2013	"Bad Girls"	Lee Hyori	as Son Hyun-woo	
2013	"Going Crazy"	Lee Hyori	as Son Hyun-woo	
2013	"Pitapat"	Bestie	as Son Hyun-woo	
2015	"Shake It"	Sistar	with Wonho, Kang Kyun-sung, and Choi Hyun-seok	

=== Audiobook narrator ===
Year	Title	Note	Ref.
2019	Annabel Lee	with I.M	
2019	My Heart Leaps Up	with I.M	

== Musicals ==
Year	Title	Role	Ref.
2024	Natasha, Pierre & The Great Comet of 1812	Anatole	

== Songwriting ==
All credits are adapted from the Korea Music Copyright Association, unless stated otherwise.

Year	Artist(s)	Song	Album	Lyrics		Music		Arrangement	
Year	Artist(s)	Song	Album	Credited	With	Credited	With	Credited	With
2019	Monsta X feat. French Montana	"Who Do U Love?"	All About Luv	Yes	I.M; Wonho; Hyungwon; Kihyun; Joohoney; Minhyuk; French Montana; Dan Henig; Jake Torrey; Noah Conrad; Rosanna Ener	Yes	I.M; Wonho; Hyungwon; Kihyun; Joohoney; Minhyuk; French Montana; Dan Henig; Jake Torrey; Noah Conrad; Rosanna Ener	No	N/A
2019	Monsta X	"Mirror"	Follow: Find You	Yes	I.M; Wonho; Joohoney; Brother Su	No	N/A	No	N/A
2020	Monsta X	"Middle of the Night"	All About Luv	No	N/A	Yes	I.M; Wonho; Hyungwon; Kihyun; Joohoney; Minhyuk; Ali Payami; John Mitchell	No	N/A

== Accolades ==
=== Awards and nominations ===
Name of the award ceremony, year presented, category, recipient of the award and the result of the nomination
Award ceremony	Year	Category	Recipient	Result	Ref.
Blue Dragon Film Awards	2022	Best Actor	Urban Myths	Shortlisted	
Blue Dragon Film Awards	2022	Best Supporting Actor	Urban Myths	Shortlisted	
Blue Dragon Film Awards	2022	Best New Actor	Urban Myths	Shortlisted	
Blue Dragon Film Awards	2022	Popular Star Award	Urban Myths	Nominated	
KBS Entertainment Awards	2024	Digital Content Award	Nopogy (with Jungwoo)	Won	
Korea Designer Fashion Awards (Note: Organized by the Korea Fashion Designers Association, it began as a networking event (CFDK Awards) between fashion officials at the end of 2012 and changed its name in 2017, which honors the achievements of fashion people who have worked hard to develop the Korean fashion and culture industry throughout the year.)	2024	Fashion Influencer Award	Shownu	Won	
MAMA Awards	2023	Culture and Style	Cast of Street Woman Fighter 2	Won	

=== Listicles ===
Name of publisher, year listed, name of listicle, and placement
Publisher	Year	Listicle	Placement	Ref.
Forbes Korea	2022	16 Most Influential Global Brand Ambassador Idols	3rd	
