= Shownu X Hyungwon =

South Korean duo

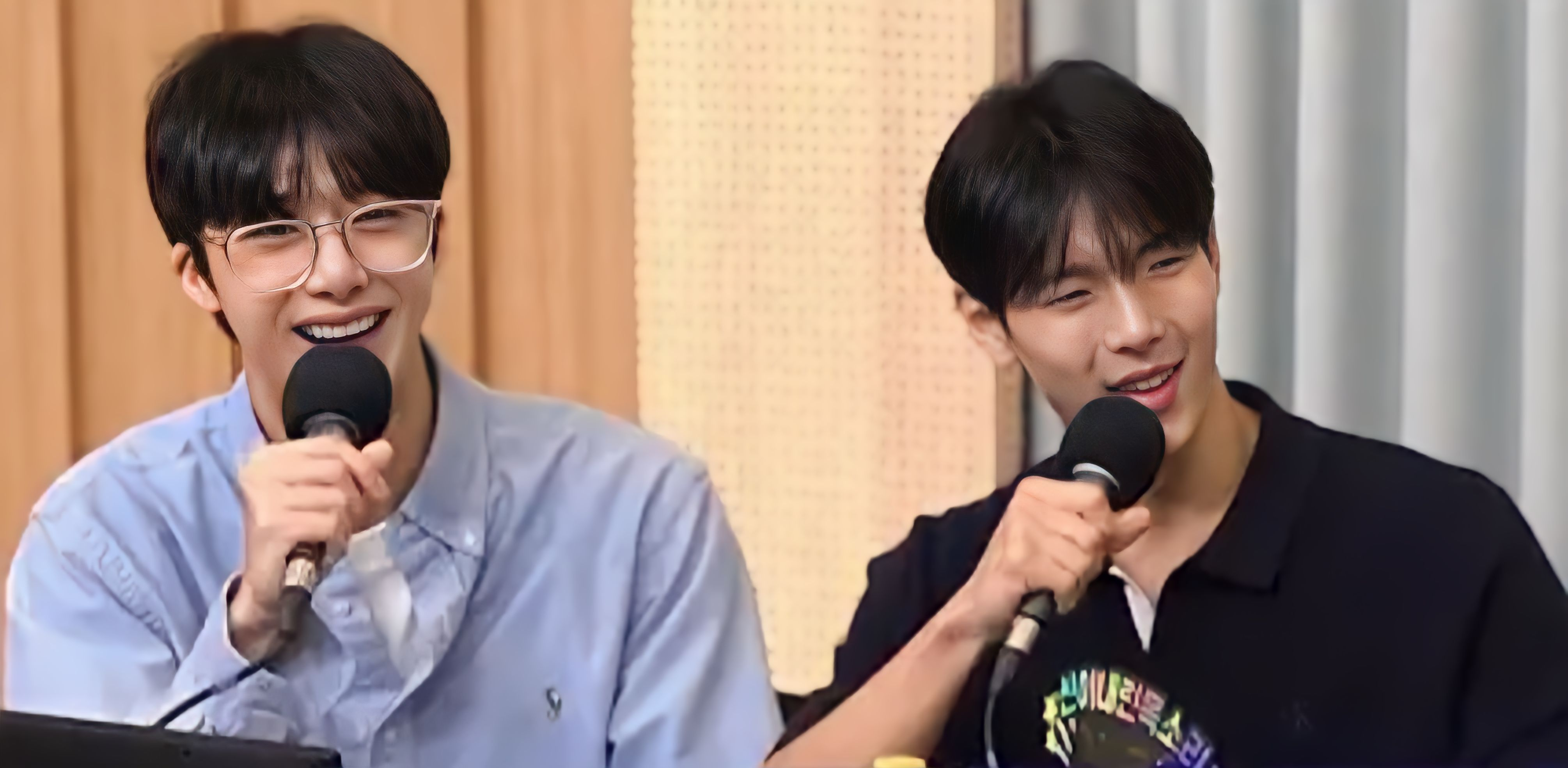
- Hyungwon and Shownu in August 2023

Background information
- Origin: Seoul, South Korea
- Genre: K-pop
- Years active: 2023–present
- Label: Starship
- Spinoff of: Monsta X
- Members: Shownu; Hyungwon

Shownu X Hyungwon (Korean: 셔누 X 형원) is the first official sub-unit of South Korean boy group Monsta X. Formed in 2023, the duo is composed of two Monsta X members: Shownu and Hyungwon. They debuted with the extended play The Unseen on July 25, 2023.

== Career ==
Official Logo

=== Pre-debut ===
In May 2023, Starship Entertainment announced that Shownu and Hyungwon will form Monsta X's first sub-unit but the specific schedule had not yet been set. On June 26, Starship Entertainment revealed their official logo through Monsta X's official SNS, showing Shownu's initial S and Hyungwon's initial H becoming one, with the debut goal for the end of July. Shownu and Hyungwon are Monsta X's main dancer and lead dancer, respectively. On June 29, they attended the TAG Heuer's "Iconic Collection Carrera" pop-up opening event, in commemoration of its 60th anniversary, held in Gangnam-gu, Seoul. On July 19, it was announced that the duo graced the cover of AtStyle's August issue.

=== 2023–present: Debut and appearances ===
On July 25, Shownu X Hyungwon released their debut EP The Unseen, with the lead single "Love Me a Little". Hyungwon produced "Love Me a Little", as well as the B-side song "Roll with Me", while Shownu participated in the choreography. Starting on July 26, the duo became the MC of KBS2's reality television show Monstop Travel Agency. On July 27, they did a celebratory performance after the first half of the soccer game between Atlético Madrid and K League for the Coupang Play Series, held at Seoul World Cup Stadium.

On August 5, Shownu X Hyungwon performed for Pepsi Summer Festa 2023, held at Jamsil Indoor Stadium in Seoul. On August 11, the duo had been part of 2023 Saemangeum World Scout Jamboree K-pop Super Live, held at Seoul World Cup Stadium. On August 18, they performed for KCON, held at Crypto.com Arena in Los Angeles. On August 20, Shownu X Hyungwon performed for KAMPFEST CDMX 2023, held at Palacio de los Deportes in Mexico City. On August 26, the duo performed for Krazy K-pop Super Concert as one of the headliners, held at UBS Arena in New York City.

On September 9, they performed for Someday Festival 2023, held at Nanji Hangang Park in Seoul. On September 23, Shownu X Hyungwon performed for K-POP NATION as the headliner, held at PGE Narodowy in Warsaw.

On October 15, the duo performed for M Countdown, held at Paris La Défense Arena in Paris.

In February 2024, they released a cover of 2PM's "I Hate You" under Spotify's K-pop ON! playlist.

In May 2025, Shownu X Hyungwon performed for KT POP 2025, held at National Stadium in Kaohsiung.

On August 23, the duo performed for 2025 CassCool Festival, held at Seoul Land in Gwacheon.

On November 15, they performed for Waterbomb, held at Vạn Phúc City in Ho Chi Minh City.

In May 2026, it was announced that Shownu X Hyungwon will release their second EP Love Me on May 21, with the lead single "Do You Love Me". Their solo songs; Shownu's "Around & Go" and Hyungwon's "No Air", which were performed at The X: Nexus World Tour, will be included in the EP. Hyungwon also produced the three tracks; "Superstitious", "In My Head", and "Accelerator", while Shownu participated in the overall choreography of "Do You Love Me".

In July, the duo performed for Waterbomb, held at KINTEX in Gyeonggi-do.

In October, they attended the 2027 S/S Paris Fashion Week.

== Public image ==
Shownu is known for his dance moves and stable live skill, while Hyungwon for his visual, dance, and producing ability. As Shownu X Hyungwon, the duo is described as "perfect combination of similar personalities and performances".

== Other ventures ==
=== Ambassadorship ===
In September 2026, it was announced that they became the global ambassadors for Concept Korea, which was hosted by the Ministry of Culture, Sports and Tourism and organized by the Korea Creative Content Agency. Founded in 2010, it is an initiative by the Korean government that supports young, local designers on an international level and spotlights the most interesting names in South Korean fashion.

=== Arts and photography ===
In October 2023, Shownu X Hyungwon released their unit's first photobook On My Way, which contains coming-of-age images taken by them, while presenting a variety of concepts and styling against the backdrop of New York City. From October 24 to November 5, the duo held its exhibition at Noudit Hongdae in Seoul, with various MDs and events.

=== Endorsements ===
In August 2023, Shownu X Hyungwon participated in the carbonated soft drink brand Pepsi's campaign through the Korean star and style magazine AtStyle. On August 9, the duo collaborated with the Singaporean online travel agency Trip.com through KBS2's reality television show Monstop Travel Agency.

In February 2024, they participated in the Swedish audio streaming and media service provider Spotify's campaign for its K-pop flagship playlist K-pop ON!, under the theme of "My K-pop First Crush", in commemoration of its 10th anniversary.

=== Philanthropy ===
In October 2025, Shownu X Hyungwon participated in a charity event for the fashion magazine W Korea's breast cancer awareness campaign "Love Your W".

== Members ==
- Shownu (셔누)
- Hyungwon (형원)

== Discography ==
=== Extended plays ===
List of extended plays, with selected details, chart positions and sales
Title	Details	Peak chart positions	Sales
Title	Details	KOR	Sales
The Unseen	Released: July 25, 2023; Label: Starship Entertainment; Formats: CD, digital download, streaming audio	6	KOR: 178,695
Love Me	Released: May 21, 2026; Label: Starship Entertainment; Formats: CD, digital download, streaming audio	10	KOR: 67,468

=== Singles ===
List of singles, showing year released, chart positions and album name
Title	Year	Peak chart positions	Album
Title	Year	KOR	Album
"Love Me a Little"	2023	49	The Unseen
"Do You Love Me"	2026	— (Note: "Do You Love Me" did not enter on the Digital Chart but appeared at number 45 on the component Download Chart.)	Love Me
"—" denotes releases that did not chart or were not released in that region.

=== Music videos ===
Title	Year	Artist	Director	Ref.
"Love Me a Little"	2023	Shownu X Hyungwon	Yeom Woo-jin	
"Do You Love Me"	2026	Shownu X Hyungwon	Kim Min-jae (Sigakryu)	

== Filmography ==
=== Television shows ===
Year	Show	Role	Note	Ref.
2023	Monstop Travel Agency	MC	11 episodes	

== Bibliography ==
Year	Title	Category	Ref.
2023	On My Way	Photobook	

== Tours and concerts ==
=== Headlining concerts ===
- Krazy K-pop Super Concert (2023)
- K-POP NATION (2023)

== Accolades ==
=== Awards and nominations ===
Name of the award ceremony, year presented, award category, recipient of the award and the result of the nomination
Award ceremony	Year	Category	Recipient	Result	Ref.
Hanteo Music Awards	2024	Global Artist – North America	Shownu X Hyungwon	Nominated	
Korea First Brand Awards (Note: Hosted by the Korea Consumer Brand Committee and the Korea Consumer Forum, the Korea First Brand Awards based its winners on a nationwide South Korean survey.)	2024	Unit Group	Shownu X Hyungwon	Won	
Korea Grand Music Awards	2026	Artist of July – Group	Shownu X Hyungwon	Won	
Korea Grand Music Awards	2026	Best Music	Love Me	Won	
Melon Music Awards	2023	Millions Top 10 Album	The Unseen	Nominated	
Seoul Music Awards	2024	Bonsang Award	Shownu X Hyungwon	Nominated	
Seoul Music Awards	2024	Popularity Award	Shownu X Hyungwon	Nominated	
Seoul Music Awards	2024	Hallyu Special Award	Shownu X Hyungwon	Nominated	

=== Listicles ===
Key
‡	Indicates a sole placement listicle

Name of publisher, year listed, name of listicle and placement
Publisher	Year	Listicle	Placement	Ref.
Consequence	2023	‡ Subunit of the Year	Placed	
