= Fatal Love (album) =

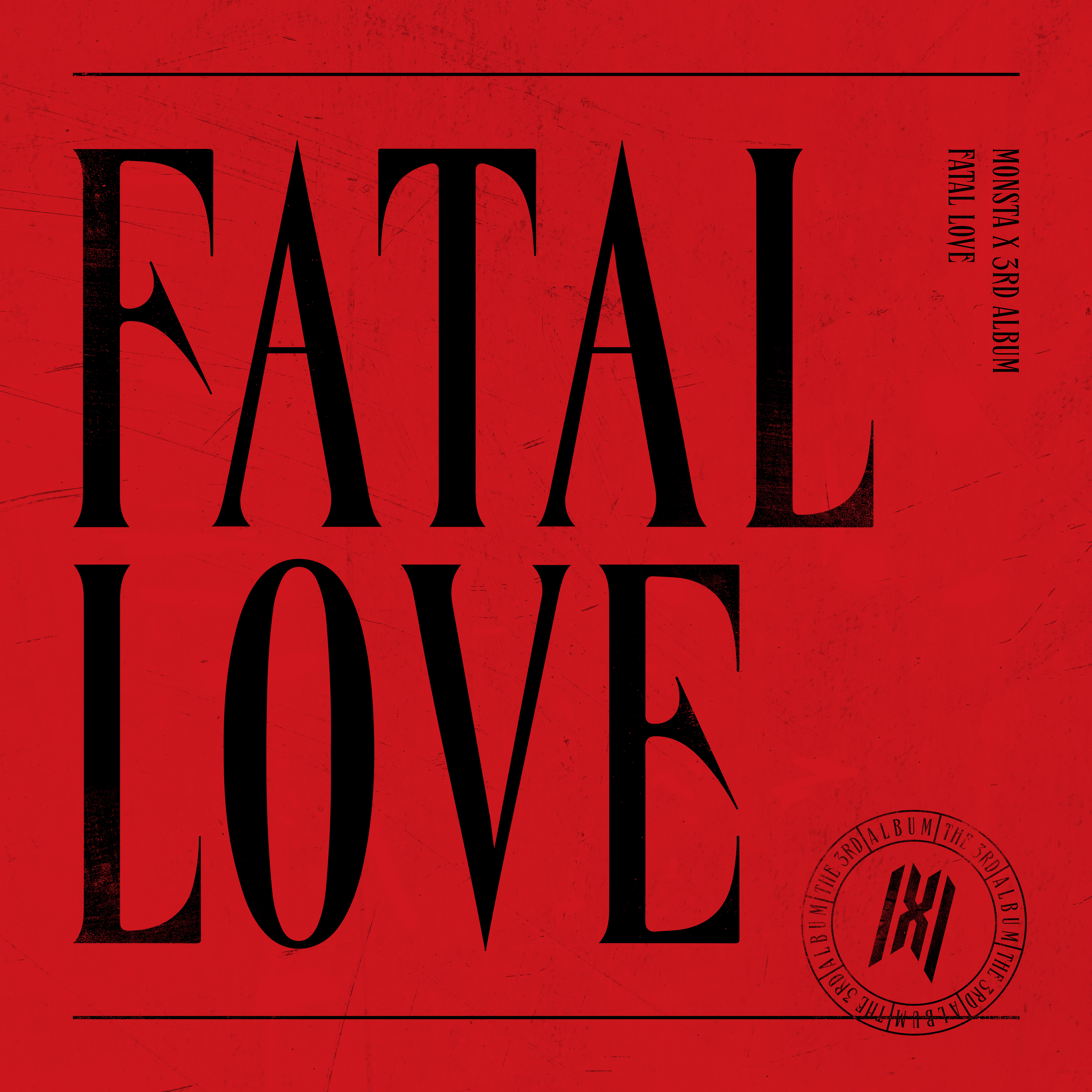

Studio album by Monsta X
- Released: November 2, 2020
- Genre: K-pop
- Length: 32:57
- Language: Korean
- Label: Starship; Kakao M

Monsta X chronology
Fantasia X (2020)	Fatal Love (2020)	Flavors of Love (2021)

Singles from Fatal Love
- 1. "Love Killa" Released: November 2, 2020

Fatal Love is the seventh and the third Korean-language studio album by the South Korean boy group Monsta X. It was released by Starship Entertainment and distributed by Kakao M on November 2, 2020.

== Background and release ==
The album was announced on October 5, 2020. The title track for the album is "Love Killa". The group collaborated with labelmates Brother Su and Jooyoung, as well as singer Eric Nam and DJ Justin Oh, for the production of the album. Additionally, the album includes Hyungwon's first song, which he is credited in all aspects of the production, including writing, composing, and arranging, for the song "Nobody Else".

The physical album was released in four versions.

== Critical reception ==
According to Faith Jung of SCMP, the album can be summed up in two words: "power" and "charisma", adding that it is a record "packed with bops perfect for dancing". This album proves that they can "come back harder and better with each new release", and each song exemplifies their "distinct style", while complementing the album's "deadly concept".

The album received praise for "showcasing all facets of their songwriting and each members' distinct artistry". The song "Nobody Else" gained praise, for its showcasing of group member Hyungwon's musical range in composition, and the album overall was praised for its "diverse musicality to satisfy any palette".

=== Listicles ===
Name of critic or publication, name of listicle, name of work and rank
Critic/Publication	List	Work	Rank	Ref.
Album
South China Morning Post	The 15 Best K-pop Albums of 2020	Fatal Love	3	
Song
BuzzFeed	35 Songs That Helped Define K-pop in 2020	"Love Killa"	20	
Refinery29	The 29 Best Songs of the Year	"Love Killa"	Placed (Note: All the albums and songs listed are either unranked or just alphabetically ranked.)	

== Commercial performance ==
Fatal Love became Monsta X's third certified platinum album through the Gaon Music Chart and sold over 280,000 albums as of January 2021.

"Love Killa" debuted on the weekly Billboard World Digital Song Sales chart at number fourteen upon release, while "Nobody Else" and "Night View" placed at number ten and at number thirteen, respectively in 2021. "Love Killa" peaked at number 135 on the weekly Gaon Digital Chart, while the other tracks did not appear on the main chart but still debuted on its component chart, the Gaon Download Chart, with "Sorry I'm Not Sorry" debuting at 170, "Beastmode" at 173, "Gasoline" at 176, "Thriller" at 180, "Night View" at 181, "Nobody Else" at 188, "Stand Together" at 189, "Last Carnival" at 191, and "Guess Who" at 199. It won two music show awards on The Show and Show Champion.

== Track listing ==
Fatal Love track listing
No.	Title	Lyrics	Music	Arrangement	Length
1.	"Love Killa"	Seo Ji-eum; Joohoney; I.M; Jeff Lewis; Andy Love	Willie Weeks; Brother Su; Kyler Niko	Willie Weeks	3:02
2.	"Gasoline" (갈증)	FlyingLab; Joohoney; I.M	Albin Nordqvist; Andreas Oberg	Albin Nordqvist	3:58
3.	"Thriller"	Lee Su-ran; danke; Joohoney; I.M	Jeff Lewis; Andy Love; Joony	Joony	3:39
4.	"Guess Who"	danke; Joohoney; I.M	Daniel Kim; Willie Weeks; Mr Danny	Willie Weeks	3:25
5.	"Nobody Else"	Hyungwon; Jantine Annika Heij; I.M; Justin Oh	Hyungwon; Jantine Annika Heij	Hyungwon; Jantine Annika Heij	3:02
6.	"Beastmode"	Joohoney; 9F; Eric Nam; I.M	Joohoney; 9F; Eric Nam	Joohoney; 9F	3:15
7.	"Stand Together" (대동단결)	Joohoney; Ye-Yo!; I.M	Joohoney; Ye-Yo!; Laser	Joohoney; Ye-Yo!	3:03
8.	"Night View"	I.M; Yoonseok; Wooki; Joohoney	I.M; Yoonseok; Wooki	I.M; Yoonseok; Wooki	3:09
9.	"Last Carnival"	FlyingLab	Jeremy Jasper; Adrian McKinnon; LDN Noise	LDN Noise	2:54
10.	"Sorry I'm Not Sorry"	Bottle God; Jooyoung	Bottle God; Jooyoung	Bottle God	3:27
Total length:					33:04

== Charts ==
=== Album ===
==== Weekly charts ====
Chart performance for Fatal Love
Chart (2020)	Peak position
Japan Hot Albums (Billboard Japan)	75
Japanese Albums (Oricon)	16
Polish Albums (ZPAV)	21
South Korean Albums (Gaon)	1
UK Digital Albums (OCC)	87
US World Albums (Billboard)	11

==== Monthly chart ====
Chart performance for Fatal Love
Chart (2020)	Peak position
South Korean Albums (Gaon)	4

==== Year-end chart ====
Chart performance for Fatal Love
Chart (2020)	Position
South Korean Albums (Gaon)	33

=== Songs ===
==== Weekly charts ====
Chart performance for "Love Killa"
Chart (2020)	Peak position
South Korea (Gaon)	135
South Korea (K-pop Hot 100)	87
US World Digital Song Sales (Billboard)	14

Chart performance for "Nobody Else"
Chart (2021)	Peak position
US World Digital Song Sales (Billboard)	10

Chart performance for "Night View"
Chart (2021)	Peak position
US World Digital Song Sales (Billboard)	13

== Certification and sales ==
Certification and sales for Fatal Love
Region	Certification	Certified units/Sales
South Korea (KMCA)	Platinum	321,100
Japan	—	4,306

== Accolades ==
Music program award for "Love Killa"
Program	Date (2 total)	Ref.
Show Champion	November 11, 2020	
The Show	November 10, 2020	

== Awards and nominations ==
Name of the award ceremony, year presented, award category, nominated work and the result of the nomination
Award ceremony	Year	Category	Nominated work	Result	Ref.
Golden Disc Awards	2021	Disc Bonsang	Fatal Love	Nominated	

== Release history ==
Release history and formats for Fatal Love
Region	Date	Format	Label
South Korea	November 2, 2020	CD; digital download; streaming	Starship Entertainment; Kakao M
Various	November 2, 2020	Digital download; streaming	Starship Entertainment; Kakao M

== See also ==
- List of certified albums in South Korea
- List of Gaon Album Chart number ones of 2020
- List of K-pop albums on the Billboard charts
- List of K-pop songs on the Billboard charts
- List of K-pop songs on the World Digital Song Sales chart
