= The Unseen (EP) =

- Digital cover

EP by Shownu X Hyungwon
- Released: July 25, 2023
- Genre: K-pop
- Length: 15:20
- Language: Korean
- Label: Starship; Kakao

Shownu X Hyungwon chronology
| The Unseen (2023) | Love Me (2026) |

Singles from The Unseen
- 1. "Love Me a Little" Released: July 25, 2023

The Unseen (stylized as THE UИSEEN) is the debut extended play by the South Korean boy group Monsta X's first official sub-unit Shownu X Hyungwon. It was released by Starship Entertainment and distributed by Kakao Entertainment on July 25, 2023. The EP contains five tracks, including the lead single "Love Me a Little".

== Background and release ==
In May 2023, Starship Entertainment announced that Shownu and Hyungwon will form Monsta X's first sub-unit but its schedule had not yet been set. On June 26, Starship Entertainment revealed their official logo through the group's official SNS, announcing the debut of the duo at the end of July. On June 28, it was revealed that the EP's title is The Unseen, with the lead single titled "Love Me a Little" and four new tracks, revealed on July 12. On July 25, Shownu X Hyungwon had The Unseen Release Talk Live, to commemorate the release of the EP and communicate with fans through Monsta X's official YouTube channel.

The physical EP was released in two standard and limited edition versions, alongside jewel cases version and a KiT version.

== Composition ==
Hyungwon produced "Love Me a Little", as well as the B-side song "Roll with Me", while Shownu participated in the choreography.

The Unseen contains the perspectives of two people who greet numerous "me" who exist in the eyes of others. It also shows how Shownu and Hyungwon expand their own world with delicate details and composure, capturing a darker and more mature image of them, a culmination of 8 years of hard work.

"Love Me a Little" is a track with a midtempo chorus backed by percussion, depicting the conflict between our true self and what others want us to be, "Love Therapy" is a hybrid pop style-groovy undercurrent of 808 bass track with a charming melody and mournful vocals, "Roll with Me" is a smoky, piano-backed track in an impressively unique arrangement, "Play Me" is an electro-pop synthesizer track which arrays their various charms, and "Slow Dance" is a dream-pop masterpiece and a gentle 8-bit notes track which stands out with the duo's sweet voice.

== Commercial performance ==
The Unseen placed at number 5 on the Circle Chart's Retail Album Chart, for the week of July 23 to 29, with 24,953 copies sold, while number 6 and number 26 on the Circle Album Chart, with 111,297 copies sold. The EP also placed at number 1 on the Hanteo's Global Authentication Chart, for the month of August.

For the EP's tracks, three of which entered the Billboard's Hot Trending Songs Chart, for the week of July 30 to August 5, with "Love Therapy" at number 7, "Play Me" at number 10, and "Slow Dance" at number 14.

== Track listing ==
The Unseen track listing
| No. | Title | Lyrics | Music | Arrangement | Length |
|---|---|---|---|---|---|
| 1. | "Love Me a Little" | Hyungwon; Justin Oh; Jantine Annika Heij; Rudi Zygadlo | Hyungwon; Justin Oh; Jantine Annika Heij; Rudi Zygadlo | Hyungwon; Justin Oh | 3:19 |
| 2. | "Love Therapy" | Cho Yoon-kyung | Stereo14; Eung Kim; Jimmy Claeson | Stereo14; Eung Kim | 2:44 |
| 3. | "Roll with Me" | Hyungwon; Justin Oh; Roel Rats; Marcia "Misha Angèle" Sondeijker; Jim van Hooff | Hyungwon; Justin Oh; Roel Rats | Hyungwon; Justin Oh | 3:05 |
| 4. | "Play Me" | Danke (Lalala Studio) | Ryan S. Jhun; Michael "Omega" Fonseca; Benjamin Samama; Jordan Reyes | Ryan S. Jhun; Michael "Omega" Fonseca; Jordan Reyes | 3:20 |
| 5. | "Slow Dance" | Brother Su | Ryan S. Jhun; Benjamin Samama; KillaGram; Sam DeRosa; Cory Enemy | Ryan S. Jhun; Cory Enemy | 2:52 |
| Total length: | | | | | 15:20 |

== Charts ==
=== Weekly chart ===
Chart performance for The Unseen
| Chart (2023) | Peak position |
|---|---|
| South Korean Albums (Circle) | 6 |

=== Monthly chart ===
Chart performance for The Unseen
| Chart (2023) | Peak position |
|---|---|
| South Korean Albums (Circle) | 15 |

== Certification and sales ==
Certification and sales for The Unseen
| Region | Certification | Certified units/sales |
|---|---|---|
| South Korea | — | 178,695 |

== Awards and nominations ==
Name of the award ceremony, year presented, award category and the result of the nomination
| Award ceremony | Year | Category | Result | Ref. |
|---|---|---|---|---|
| Melon Music Awards | 2023 | Millions Top 10 Album | Nominated | |

== Release history ==
Release history and formats for The Unseen
| Region | Date | Format | Label |
|---|---|---|---|
| South Korea | July 25, 2023 | CD; digital download; streaming | Starship Entertainment; Kakao Entertainment |
| Various | July 25, 2023 | Digital download; streaming | Starship Entertainment; Kakao Entertainment |
