= Urban Myths (film) =

2022 South Korean anthology film

- Official poster
- Hangul: 서울괴담
- Hanja: 서울怪談
- RR: Seoul goedam
- MR: Sŏul koedam
- Directed by: Hong Won-ki
- Written by: Kang Ji-yoon
- Starring: Kim Do-yoon; Lee Yul-eum; Lee Su-min; Arin; Jeong Won-chang; Exy; Seol-ah; Lee Min-hyuk; Lee Young-jin; Seo Ji-soo; Shownu; Bong Jae-hyun; AleXa; Ju Hak-nyeon
- Edited by: Han Young-kyu
- Production companies: Zanybros; Megabox JoongAng PlusM
- Distributed by: Megabox JoongAng PlusM
- Release date: April 27, 2022
- Running time: 123 minutes
- Country: South Korea
- Language: Korean
- Box office: est. $811,092

Urban Myths (Korean: 서울괴담; Hanja: 서울怪談; RR: Seoul goedam) is a 2022 South Korean anthology horror film, consisting of ten stories directed by debutant director Hong Won-ki, featuring Kim Do-yoon, Lee Yul-eum, Lee Young-jin and Lee Su-min. The omnibus film presents stories where horror is felt in familiar everyday life places like noise between floors, old furniture, mannequins, tunnel and social media. It was released theatrically on April 27, 2022.

== Stories ==
Story	Title	Main cast	Synopsis
1	"Tunnel" (터널, Teoneol)	Kim Do-yoon	One night, Gi-hoon is returning from a fishing trip in his car, as he comes near a tunnel, he sees handprints over his windshield. He tries to activate the wiper to clean them off, but these are still there. He cleans them from inside, and they all go. Is he alone or...? The truth comes out when he enters the tunnel ahead...
2	"The Woman in Red" (빨간옷, Ppalgan-ot)	Lee Yul-eum	Soo-jin attends Hyeon-joo's funeral, whom she bullied. There, she hears that Hyeon-joo has committed suicide. After her funeral, she is tormented by visions of a woman in red. And there is no escape from it.
3	"Tooth Worms" (치충, Chi-chung)	Lee Ho-won	A man complained of endless toothache visits the dentist (Choong Jae), but Choong Jae was not able to find the cause of it. Only after consulting his mentor and doing research in the library does he realise the toothaches are more than it.
4	"Necromancy" (혼숨, Honsum)	Lee Su-min, Arin	Two teen girls named Ji-hyeon and Hye-yeon were best friends. They shared dreams and interests and made wild promises, and one such promise was to perform necromancy ritual if the other ever died. When Hye-yeon dies, Ji-hyeon in her grief honors the promise and successfully brings back Hye-yeon's soul, but soon after, she finds out that she shouldn't have...
5	"The Wall" (충간소음, Chung-gansoeum)	Jeong Won-chang, Exy	Jeong-gyoon (Jeong Won-chang) moves into a new dorm and hears noise coming from the wall next to him, but he doesn't care. The next day, he meets a woman (Exy) and has an affair. But the problem is that the room is noisy from the wall in her room.
6	"The Closet" (중고가구, Jung-gogagu)	Seola	Ji Hye is looking for a closet to fit her house, after finding a cheap closet from the creepy owner, she starts to experience sleepless nights due to something touching her, is there something wrong with the closet...?
7	"Ghost Marriage" (혼인, Honin)	Lee Min-hyuk, Lee Young-jin	Jae Hoon was in an interview for a new job, but strangely, the interview asked for his time of birth and his name in Hanja. Despite warning from his friend that the interview is shady, he managed to prevail and got the job. But soon he finds out the job comes with a "Marriage".
8	"The Girl in the Mirror" (얼굴도둑, Eolguldoduk)	Seo Ji-soo	Hyeon-joo works in a cosmetic shop and is obsessed with her beauty. In order to be an influencer to get sponsorship for cosmetics, she starts to take pictures and post on social media to gain more followers, but is that the only way...?
9	"A Mannequin" (마네킹, Maneking)	Shownu	Jong Chan works for a warehouse that stores Mannequin. There are stories of extra mannequins found that do not belong and are human-like. One day after work, Jong Chan saw an old man talking to mannequin that turned around and stared at him. Is that mannequin alive?
10	"Escape Games" (방탈출, Bangtalchul)	Bong Jae-hyun, AleXa, Ju Hak-nyeon	Se-ri (AleXa) is a famous social media influencer and escape room expert with Nu-ri (Ju Hak-nyeon) and Young-min (Bong Jae-hyun) accepts the huge sponsorship of 10 million won on the condition of escaping the special escape room but the greater the reward, the greater the risk.

== Cast ==
=== "Tunnel" ===
- Kim Do-yoon as Gi-hoon

=== "The Woman in Red" ===
- Lee Yul-eum as Soo-jin

=== "Tooth Worms" ===
- Lee Ho-won as Choong-jae

=== "Necromancy" ===
- Lee Su-min as Hye-yeon
- Arin as Ji-hyeon

=== "The Wall" ===
- Jeong Won-chang as Jeong-gyoon
- Exy as woman

=== "The Closet" ===
- Seola as Ji-hye

=== "Ghost Marriage" ===
- Lee Min-hyuk as Jae-hoon
- Lee Young-jin as Eun-yeong

=== "The Girl In The Mirror" ===
- Seo Ji-soo as Hyeon-joo

=== "A Mannequin" ===
- Shownu as Jong-chan

=== "Escape Games" ===
- Bong Jae-hyun as Young-min
- AleXa as Se-ri
- Ju Hak-nyeon as Nu-ri

== Production ==
Principal photography began on April 29, 2021.

== Release and reception ==
The film was released in 13 countries overseas including Japan, Thailand, and Taiwan in May 2022.

=== Box office ===
The film was released on 474 screens on April 27, 2022. It was placed at 3rd place at domestic box office on opening day.

As of May 15, it is at 13th place among all the Korean films released in the year 2022, with gross of $811,092 and 109,017 admissions.

=== Critical response ===
Kim Na-yeon of Star News writing about the format said, "[it is] eye-catching" and "the story that breaks the boundaries between reality and ghost stories is the sufficient 'virtue' of this film." She praised the performances of idols and wrote, "these actors completely erased concerns about their acting skills, and only made use of their strengths." Kim was also critical of the story as she wrote, "it seems that the 'poorness' of the story could not be filled even with the passionate performances of the actors who made use of each episode". Kim didn't appreciate the "excessive sound that appears every time before an important scene", and the transforming of "a character into a zombie or a bizarre monster" as it "can come as an unpleasant feeling rather than a fear."

Lee Yoo-chae writing for Cine21 stated that idols appearing in the short stories and making different facial expressions is a "special gift for fans in that you can see a different side of your favorite star". Lee concluded by writing, "Overall, it is a mild-tasting horror film with less tension because it is easy to predict when something will come out." Lee further stated, "Contrary to the title, it is also unfortunate that the characteristics of the city of Seoul do not stand out."
