= Love Me a Little =

Single by Shownu X Hyungwon

from the album The Unseen
- Language: Korean
- Released: July 25, 2023
- Genre: K-pop
- Length: 3:19
- Label: Starship; Kakao
- Composers: Hyungwon; Justin Oh; Jantine Annika Heij; Rudi Zygadlo
- Lyricists: Hyungwon; Justin Oh; Jantine Annika Heij; Rudi Zygadlo
- Producers: Hyungwon; Justin Oh

Music video
- "Love Me a Little" on YouTube

"Love Me a Little" is the debut song recorded by the South Korean boy group Monsta X's first official sub-unit Shownu X Hyungwon for their debut extended play The Unseen. It was released as lead single of the EP by Starship Entertainment and Kakao Entertainment on July 25, 2023.

== Background and release ==
On June 28, Starship Entertainment revealed that the EP's title is The Unseen, with the lead single titled "Love Me a Little", revealed on July 12. Hyungwon produced the lead single, while Shownu participated in its choreography.

== Composition ==
"Love Me a Little" is a track with a midtempo chorus backed by percussion, depicting the conflict between our true self and what others want us to be. It is also described as a plea to a lover to love them just a little bit more as they evolve as people.

== Music video ==
"Love Me a Little" video sees the duo preoccupied with the way the object of their affections makes them feel, from captivated to borderline insane. Even simple things like driving then lying in bed prove to be a task, as their thoughts overtake them. It also features Shownu X Hyungwon performing the track's sultry choreography atop a stage covered with water.

== Promotion ==
On July 25, Shownu X Hyungwon held The Unseen Release Talk Live to commemorate the release of the debut EP The Unseen, including "Love Me a Little" through Monsta X's official YouTube channel. On July 27, they did a "Love Me a Little" celebratory performance after the first half of the soccer game between Atlético Madrid and K League for the Coupang Play Series, held at Seoul World Cup Stadium. The duo also subsequently appeared on several music programs such as Mnet's M Countdown on July 27, KBS2's Music Bank on July 28, MBC's Show! Music Core on July 29, and SBS' Inkigayo on July 30. On August 11, they performed "Love Me a Little" for the 2023 Saemangeum World Scout Jamboree K-pop Super Live, held at Seoul World Cup Stadium. On August 15, Shownu X Hyungwon appeared on the famous morning talk show Good Day New York, promoting "Love Me a Little".

== Critical reception ==
Professional ratings
Review scores
Source	Rating
IZM	2.5/5 stars

Han Seong-hyun of IZM described "Love Me a Little" as a song that "flows neatly without any superfluities", added that "distance between the heavy sound that seems to express tamed wildness and the light repetition-oriented chorus is not easily narrowed", which made it "more like a long-term project rather than a one-off song".

== Commercial performance ==
"Love Me a Little" charted at number 49 on Circle Digital Chart, for the week of July 23 to 29, with 5,670,337 digital points.

== Credits and personnel ==
Credits adapted from Melon.

- Shownu – vocals, choreography
- Hyungwon – vocals, lyrics, composition, arrangement
- Justin Oh – lyrics, composition, arrangement
- Jantine Annika Heij – lyrics, composition
- Rudi Zygadlo – lyrics, composition

== Charts ==
=== Weekly chart ===
Chart performance for "Love Me a Little"
Chart (2023)	Peak position
South Korea (Circle)	49

== Release history ==
Release history and formats for "Love Me a Little"
Region	Date	Format	Label
South Korea	July 25, 2023	Digital download; streaming	Starship Entertainment; Kakao Entertainment
Various	July 25, 2023	Digital download; streaming	Starship Entertainment; Kakao Entertainment
