= Flavors of Love =

- Digital cover

Studio album by Monsta X
- Released: May 5, 2021
- Genre: J-pop
- Length: 38:26
- Language: Japanese
- Label: Universal Music Japan

Monsta X chronology
Fatal Love (2020)	Flavors of Love (2021)	One of a Kind (2021)

Singles from Flavors of Love
- 1. "Wish on the Same Sky" Released: March 30, 2020; 2. "Love Killa (Japanese version)" Released: December 16, 2020; 3. "Wanted" Released: February 10, 2021; 4. "Flavors of Love" Released: April 14, 2021

Flavors of Love is the third Japanese-language studio album of the South Korean boy group Monsta X. It was released and distributed by Universal Music Japan on May 5, 2021. The lead single of the same title was released on April 14.

== Background and release ==
The album was announced on March 9, as a surprise announcement following the release of the single album Wanted. It also include five new Japanese tracks as well as six previously released tracks. These previously released tracks were from Monsta X's three single albums released in 2020 and early 2021: Wish on the Same Sky, Love Killa (Japanese version), and Wanted.

"Wanted" and "Neo Universe" were released as part of the single album Wanted, released on March 10. "Wanted" was pre-released on February 10 and its music video released on February 13.

The group pre-released the lead single "Flavors of Love" on April 14.

== Commercial performance ==
The album sold 20,312 copies for its first week, topping both the weekly charts for Billboard Japan and Tower Records Japan.

Three of the tracks, released as singles, charted on both the weekly Oricon Singles Chart and Billboard Japan Hot 100 chart.

== Track listing ==
Flavors of Love track listing
No.	Title	Lyrics	Music	Length
1.	"Wanted"	Zero	Albin Nordqvist; Steven Lee; Sqvare	3:33
2.	"Follow" (Japanese version)	Joohoney; I.M; Seo Ji-eum; Brother Su	Daniel Kim; Willie Weeks; Andreas Oberg; Skylar Mones	3:33
3.	"Fantasia" (Japanese version)	Joohoney; I.M; Brother Su	Willie Weeks; Michelle Bastiansen; Carlos Okabe; Ollipop	3:06
4.	"Re:Verse Day"	Zero	Darren Ellis Smith; Sqvare	3:29
5.	"Diamond Heart"	Zero	Phil Schwan; Alyssa Ayaka Ichinose; Sean Michael Alexander; Sqvare	3:49
6.	"Secret"	Yves&Adams	Gustav Efraimsson; Johan Becker; Ninos Hanna; Adam Kulling	3:09
7.	"Love Killa" (Japanese version)	Joohoney; I.M; Seo Ji-eum; Jeff Lewis; Andy Love	Willie Weeks; Brother Su; Kyler Niko	3:03
8.	"Detox"	Zero	Daniel Caesar; Gregory Curtis	3:41
9.	"Wish on the Same Sky"	Zero	Sean Michael Alexander; Phil Schwan; Drew Ryan Scott	3:46
10.	"Neo Universe"	Zero	Mahoney; Josef Melin	4:02
11.	"Flavors of Love"	Jon Hallgren; Juanjo Monserrat; Lukas Hallgren; Yves&Adams; Yohan Bekka	Monsta X	3:17
Total length:				38:26

== Charts ==
=== Album ===
==== Weekly charts ====
Chart performance for Flavors of Love
Chart (2021)	Peak position
Japan Hot Albums (Billboard Japan)	1
Japanese Albums (Oricon)	2

=== Songs ===
==== Weekly charts ====
Chart performance for "Wish on the Same Sky"
Chart (2020)	Peak position
Japan Hot 100 (Billboard Japan)	7
Japanese Singles (Oricon)	2

Chart performance for "Love Killa" (Japanese version)
Chart (2020)	Peak position
Japan Hot 100 (Billboard Japan)	36
Japanese Singles (Oricon)	8

Chart performance for "Wanted"
Chart (2021)	Peak position
Japan Hot 100 (Billboard Japan)	24
Japanese Singles (Oricon)	2

== Sales ==
Region	Work	Sales
Album
Japan	Flavors of Love	22,533
Songs
Japan	"Wish on the Same Sky"	75,736 (Phy.)
Japan	"Love Killa" (Japanese version)	28,175 (Phy.)
Japan	"Wanted"	43,556 (Phy.)
