= Fantasia X =

EP by Monsta X
- Released: May 26, 2020
- Genre: K-pop
- Length: 23:05
- Language: Korean
- Label: Starship; Kakao M

Monsta X chronology
All About Luv (2020)	Fantasia X (2020)	Fatal Love (2020)

Singles from Fantasia X
- 1. "Fantasia" Released: May 26, 2020

Fantasia X is the eighth extended play by the South Korean boy group Monsta X. It was released by Starship Entertainment and distributed by Kakao M on May 26, 2020. It had seven tracks, with "Fantasia" as the title track.

== Background and release ==
This was Monsta X's first comeback without Wonho, as he left the group on October 31, 2019. It was initially set to be released on May 11 but was postponed to May 26, so that Shownu could recover from his back pain.

The EP was released in four versions.

== Critical reception ==
Taylor Glasby of Clash described Fantasia X as "a distillation of Monsta X's many parts. Light, breezy pop ('Beautiful Night') nestles beside sensual, bassy funk ('It Ain't Over'), the record's middle section reinforced by the commanding brass and EDM of 'Chaotic' and a thumping party track – 'Zone'". 'Stand Up' is "a confession of pain experienced but also a rallying cry to prevail" and "beneath its bouncy, trop-house beats" is a song that "reflects the band's journey through dark places to emerge on the other side".

=== Listicles ===
Name of critic or publication, name of listicle, name of work and rank
Critic/Publication	List	Work	Rank	Ref.
Song
Dazed	The 40 Best K-pop Songs of 2020	"Fantasia"	23	

== Commercial performance ==
The album is certified Platinum in South Korea and has sold 271,263 units as of 2020. The album peaked at number 2 on the weekly Gaon Album Chart, and at number 5 on Billboard's World Albums chart.

The title track "Fantasia" peaked at number 117 on the weekly Gaon Digital Chart and on the weekly Billboard World Digital Song Sales chart at number 11. The track "Stand Up" also appeared on the Billboard World Digital Song Sales chart at number 25. It did not appear on the weekly Gaon Digital Chart, though it appeared on its component Gaon Download Chart at number 102, alongside the other five songs on the EP, with "Flow" at 99, "Zone" at 104, "Beautiful Night" at 106, "Chaotic" at 112, and "It Ain't Over" at 115. It won the song of the week on The Show.

== Track listing ==
Fantasia X track listing
No.	Title	Lyrics	Music	Arrangement	Length
1.	"Fantasia"	Brother Su; Joohoney; I.M	Willie Weeks; Michelle Bastiansen; Carlos Okabe; OLLIPOP	Willie Weeks	3:06
2.	"Flow"	Joohoney; I.M; 9F	Joohoney; 9F	Joohoney; 9F	3:36
3.	"Zone"	I.M; 윤석 (Yoonseok); Wooki; Joohoney	I.M; 윤석 (Yoonseok); Wooki	I.M; 윤석 (Yoonseok); Wooki	3:14
4.	"Chaotic"	ZNEE (Flying Lab); 장다인 (FlyingLab); Joohoney; I.M	Stereo14; Drew Ryan Scott; Sean Michael Alexander	Stereo14	3:35
5.	"Beautiful Night"	iHwak; Flow Blow; Joohoney; I.M	iHwak; Flow Blow	Flow Blow	3:03
6.	"It Ain't Over"	Brother Su; Joohoney; I.M	Willie Weeks; Brother Su	Willie Weeks	3:10
7.	"Stand Up"	Joohoney; Ye-Yo!; I.M	Joohoney; Ye-Yo!	Joohoney; Ye-Yo!	3:21
Total length:					23:05

== Charts ==
=== Album ===
==== Weekly charts ====
Chart performance for Fantasia X
Chart (2020)	Peak position
Japan Hot Albums (Billboard Japan)	40
Japanese Albums (Oricon)	17
South Korean Albums (Gaon)	2
US World Albums (Billboard)	5

==== Monthly chart ====
Chart performance for Fantasia X
Chart (2020)	Peak position
South Korean Albums (Gaon)	6

==== Year-end chart ====
Chart performance for Fantasia X
Chart (2020)	Position
South Korean Albums (Gaon)	36

=== Songs ===
==== Weekly charts ====
Chart performance for "Fantasia"
Chart (2020)	Peak position
Japan Hot 100 (Billboard Japan)	81
South Korea (Gaon)	117
US World Digital Song Sales (Billboard)	11

Chart performance for "Stand Up"
Chart (2021)	Peak position
US World Digital Song Sales (Billboard)	25

== Certification and sales ==
Certification and sales for Fantasia X
Region	Certification	Certified units/Sales
South Korea (KMCA)	Platinum	271,263
Japan	—	2,282

== Accolades ==
Music program award for "Fantasia"
Program	Date	Ref.
The Show	June 2, 2020	

== Awards and nominations ==
Name of the award ceremony, year presented, award category, nominated work and the result of the nomination
Award ceremony	Year	Category	Nominated work	Result	Ref.
Melon Plaque Award (Note: This event was held to discover hidden masterpieces that have not been noticed because of the title song through voting.)	2022	The Best Album Tracks – Top 10	"Stand Up"	Won	

== Release history ==
Release history and formats for Fantasia X
Region	Date	Format	Label
South Korea	May 26, 2020	CD; digital download; streaming	Starship Entertainment; Kakao M
Various	May 26, 2020	Digital download; streaming	Starship Entertainment; Kakao M

== See also ==
- List of certified albums in South Korea
- List of K-pop albums on the Billboard charts
- List of K-pop songs on the Billboard charts
- List of K-pop songs on the World Digital Song Sales chart
