= History Repletion: Oh! Cool Guys =

- Promotional poster
- Also known as: Oh! Cool Guys
- Genre: Travel; Reality
- Starring: Kim Sung-joo; Ahn Jung-hwan; Han Sang-jin; Jo Se-ho; Shownu
- Country of origin: South Korea
- Original language: Korean
- No. of seasons: 1
- No. of episodes: 15

Production
- Production location: South Korea
- Running time: 100 minutes

Original release
- Network: Channel A
- Release: April 1 – July 9, 2017

History Repletion: Oh! Cool Guys (Korean: 사심충만 오! 쾌남) is a 2017 South Korean television program starring Kim Sung-joo, Ahn Jung-hwan, Han Sang-jin, Jo Se-ho and Shownu. It airs on Channel A on Saturday at 23:00 (KST) beginning 1 April 2017. From 28 May 2017, the show will air on Sundays at 20:10 (KST). The cast and guests of the show go around Korea and learn about history of Korea through various places of interest.

== Cast ==
- Kim Sung-joo
- Ahn Jung-hwan
- Han Sang-jin
- Jo Se-ho
- Shownu (Does not appear in every episode)
- Jeon Su-hyun (History teacher in episodes 10–15)
- Lee Da-ji (History teacher in episodes 1–9)

== Episodes ==
=== 2017 ===
| Episode # | Broadcast Date | Place(s) | Subject(s) | Guests (Cool Girls/Guests) |
|---|---|---|---|---|
| 1 | April 1, 2017 | Ganghwa-do | French campaign against Korea, United States expedition to Korea | Hani, Hyelin (EXID) |
| 2 | April 8, 2017 | Gyodong-do | Yeonsangun of Joseon | Jeon So-mi, Kim So-hye |
| 3 | April 15, 2017 | Changgyeonggung | Yeongjo of Joseon, Crown Prince Sado | Chaeyeon, Eunchae (DIA) |
| 4 | April 22, 2017 | Yong Yang Bong Jeo Jeong (Yong Yang Bong Jeo Shelter), Hwaseong Fortress | Jeongjo of Joseon | Nara, Yeoreum (Hello Venus) |
| 5 | April 29, 2017 | Gyeongju (Bunhwangsa, Cheomseongdae, History House of Rich Man Choi) | Queen Seondeok of Silla | Chorong, Bomi (Apink) |
| 6 | May 6, 2017 | Gyeongju (Seoak Seowon, General Kim Yoo Shin Temple, Moon Moo Dae Wang Leung (Mausoleum of Moon Moo Dae Wang) | Silla's Unification of Three Nations | Chorong, Bomi (Apink) |
| 7 | May 13, 2017 | Mangwonjeong, Unhyeongung | Heungseon Daewongun | Hyosung, Hana, Jieun (Secret) |
| 8 | May 20, 2017 | Pai Chai School, Deoksugung | Gojong of Korea | Lizzy, Kaeun (After School) |
| 9 | May 28, 2017 | Haengjusanseong | Kwon Yul | Sejeong, Mina (Gugudan) |
| 10 | June 4, 2017 | War Memorial of Korea | Korean War | Noh Sa-yeon |
| 11 | June 11, 2017 | Royal Tomb of King Sejong | Sejong the Great | Gong Seung-yeon, Woo Ji-won, Dong Hyun Kim, Park Hwi-soon |
| 12 | June 18, 2017 | Yeoju | Porcelain | Gong Seung-yeon, Woo Ji-won, Dong Hyun Kim, Park Hwi-soon, Lee Cho-hee |
| 13 | June 25, 2017 | Jeongok-ri Prehistoric Site | Prehistoric Korea | Nam Chang-hee, Yoo Byung-jae |
| 14 | July 2, 2017 | Gunsan | Korea under Japanese rule | Kim Ji-min, Heo Kyung-hwan |
| 15 | July 9, 2017 | Jeonju | Taejo of Joseon | Woori, Hyunyoung (Rainbow) |
