= Tritops =

South Korean boy band

Tritops 트리탑스
- Origin: Seoul, South Korea
- Genres: K-pop, pop, rock, ballad
- Years active: 2007–present
- Labels: Joo Paramount Media (2007); DoReMi Media (2009); JS Entertainment (2012); Simtong Entertainment (South Korea) (2013); Ivy Records (Japan) (2014-Present); Van Leader Entertainment (2014-Present)
- Members: Ban Hyungmoon; Lee Woogon; Kim Ilgoon; Jang Yoojun
- Website: TriTops

Tritops (Korean: 트리탑스, Japanese: トゥリトップス, "Tree Tops"), is a South Korean boy band managed by Van Leader Entertainment. Tritops originally debuted in 2007 as a three-member group (Hyungmoon, Yoojoon and Ilgoon) under Joo Paramount Media with their album "Boorish Love". After a company change to DoReMi Media, Ilgoon soon made his departure to pursue a solo career in 2009. The group promoted shortly as a duo, but were joined by new member Woogoon in 2012 and moved to Simtong Entertainment. In 2013, Ilgoon returned to the group. Following his return in 2014, the group moved to new entertainment call Van Leader Entertainment.

== History ==
TriTops (formerly known as I the Tri Tops) was originally a three-member group but Ilgoon left the group and Hyungmoon and Yoojoon remained. Hyungmoon and Yoojoon put out two singles in 2009, "To My Girlfriend" (which Hyungmoon composed himself) and "Say Love". The two also released a single with artist Jace titled "Juniper Tree".

=== Solo Activities ===
Ilgoon released his solo digital single "Goon" on September 3, 2009. Ban Hyungmoon also released a single "그래서 아프죠" with Dahye in 2009. Hyungmoon featured in Expresso's "Merry Christmas" which was released on November 9, 2009, and featured in the drama Kim Su-ro, The Iron King's OST titled "Want To See". Ilgoon released a single "Storm" with artist Van on May 14th, 2010 and on March 17th, 2011 he released a single "Irresponsibility". Yoojoon acted in dramas My Precious You (2008) and Becoming a Billionaire (2010). Yoojoon released a single in 2010 for Becoming a Billionaire as well. In 2011, he participated in the musical Goong and released an EP for the musical titled "Flower". In 2012, Ilgoon featured in StillPM's single, "Canada Girl".

=== Returning As "TriTops" ===
After going on a hiatus as a group for three years, TriTops returned on March 29, 2012, with a new member, WooGoon, and released a single titled "I Am A Bad Guy" which featured P.O. of Block B and peaked at 77 on GAON digital chart. The trio then released their first mini album "Sweet Holic" on May 25, 2012, which reached 30 on GAON Album chart. Ilgoon finally returned to the group in 2013. TriTops released a single, "Too Foolish To You" on February 20, 2013. They then released "Your Temperature" on December 23, 2014. They have been growing in popularity due to their strong vocal abilities since then.

=== Japanese Advancement ===
The group as of 2014 has started to promote in Japan and has held concerts there. They have worked on self-released Japanese songs, "Sakurabu", "365 Days" and "I Miss You" that can be viewed on their Japanese YouTube channel. Their official Japanese debut was with "To You" on October 27, 2014. For this debut they have added a '*' to their group name and officially debuted as Tritops*.

=== Missing You, Missing You, Missing You ===
On April 15, Tritops came back to Korea with a digital single titled "Missing You, Missing You, Missing You". The MV features Ilgoon and the Japanese model Nakamine Riko as a couple.

== Members ==
Tritops has four members. The leader and main vocalist is Ban Hyung-moon (반형문). Lee Woo-goon (이우군), Kim Il-goon (김일군), and Jang Yoo-joon (장유준) provide additional vocals.

== Discography ==
=== South Korea ===
==== Studio albums ====
- Boorish Love (2007)

==== Extended plays ====
- Sweet Holic (2012)

==== Singles ====
- "To My Girlfriend" (2009)
- "Say Love" (2009)

==== Digital Singles ====
- "I'm A Bad Guy." (2012)
- "Too Foolish To You..." (2013)
- "Your Fever" (2015)
- "Missing You, Missing You, Missing You" (2015)
- "Sorry That I'm Ugly" (2015)
- "Gilgoyangi" (2016)
- "I'll Be A Better Man" (2016)
- "Geudael Bobnida" (2017)
- "All4One" (2017)
- "Zinnia" (2017)
- "Would You Marry Me" (2017)
- "Dust Blossom" (2018)
- "If The Rain Falls" (2018)
- "My Song Is" (2018)
- "The Corner of Love" (2018)
- "Green Frog 2021" (2021)
- "To My Girlfriend" (2021)
- "Pieces of Stars Shining On You" (2022)

=== Japan ===
==== Extended plays ====
- Love Song (EP) (2018)

==== Singles ====
- "To You" (2014)
- "Paradise" (2016)

==== Digital Singles ====
- "Anata O Mimasu" (2015)
- "Pride" (2015)
- "Koko Ni Arimasu" (2015)
- "P.S I Love U" (2015)
- "Motto Motto" (2015)
- "Todokunara" (2015)
- "Aitakute, Aitakute, Aitakute" (2015)
- "Akira Bu" (2015)
- "Beautiful Day" (2016)
- "Nazedarou" (2016)
- "Noraneko" (2016)
- "My Princess" (2016)
- "Noraneko (Korean Ver.)" (2016)
- "Anata No Tame Ni" (2017)
- "Funky Music" (2017)
- "Here I Am" (2017)
- "All 4 One" (2017)
- "Hyakujitsukou" (2017)
- "Crawling" (2017)
- "The Day When We Can Meet Again" (2017)
- "Bullshit" (2017)
- "Sakura Lala" (2018)
- "Home" (2019)
- "Because of You" (2020)
- "365 Days" (2020)
- "To My Friends" (2020)
- "Dear Santa Claus..." (2020)
- "Winter Love" (2020)
- "Bokuno Anpan" (2020)
- "Kimiomatuki" (2021)
