= The Traveler (magazine) =

Chinese magazine

- Frequency: Monthly
- Publisher: Shanghai People's Fine Arts Publishing House
- Founded: 2000
- Country: China
- Based in: Shanghai

The Traveler, (Chinese: 旅行者) named World Traveler in English, is a monthly tourism magazine published by Shanghai People's Fine Arts Publishing House. The target readers of The Traveler are the middle class in China. It was founded in Shanghai in 2000.

The Traveler is the only member among Chinese tourism magazines in the Journal of the Association of the United States. It publishes primarily in the 31 provinces, autonomous regions, and two Special Administrative Regions.

The Traveler publishes mainly journeys, business trips, top 10 lists and other columns. Its columnists include Ma Modu, Chen Danyan, and Jeremy Clarkson.
