= Fashion in South Korea =

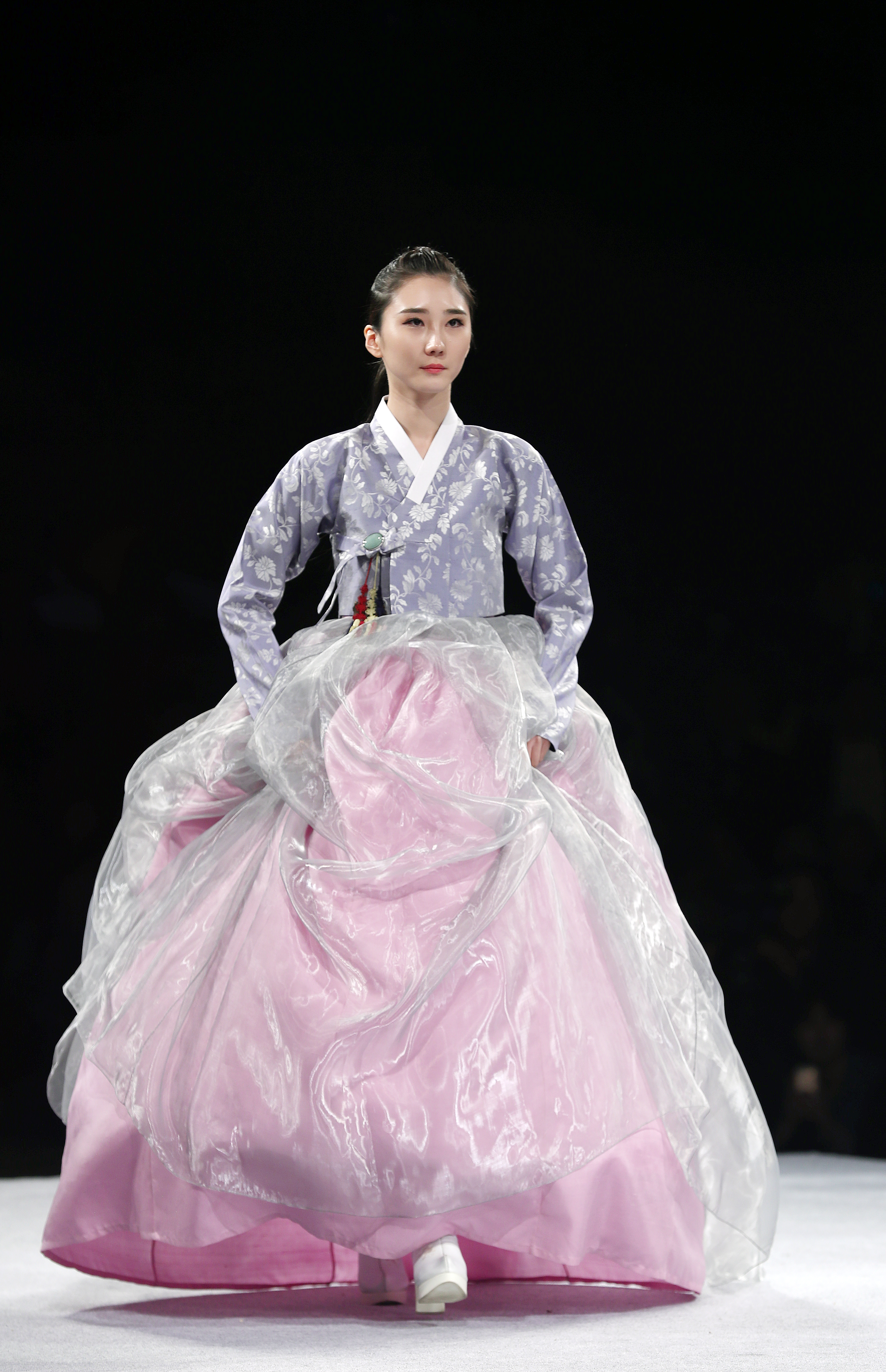
A modern hanbok at a runway show

For decades now, fashion in South Korea (Korean: 패션 인 사우스 코리아) has evolved due to inspirations from Western culture in the past, from Korea's wealth, social media practices in Korea as well as the country's highly developed economy. This, with the rise of the Korean Wave has also made Korea highly influential in fashion trends worldwide due to the popularity of its modern pop culture.

South Korean fashion has maintained a unique style which has influenced worldwide trends. South Korea's style is known for being expressive and reflecting a sense of individuality, which are absent from the style of its northern counterpart, North Korea.

In addition, the Korean Wave (the spread of appreciation for South Korean culture) could be suggested to affect the fashion world. For example, it is speculated that some pop stars from Korea have recently been making appearances in large cities such as New York, and can be seen embodying trends and styles from international locations. Euny Hong, journalist and author, predicts that this fashion phenomenon will soon reach across the world.

Acubi fashion is a contemporary South Korean style that blends minimalist aesthetics with Y2K influences and subversive basics.

== History ==
=== Antiquity and the pre-modern era ===
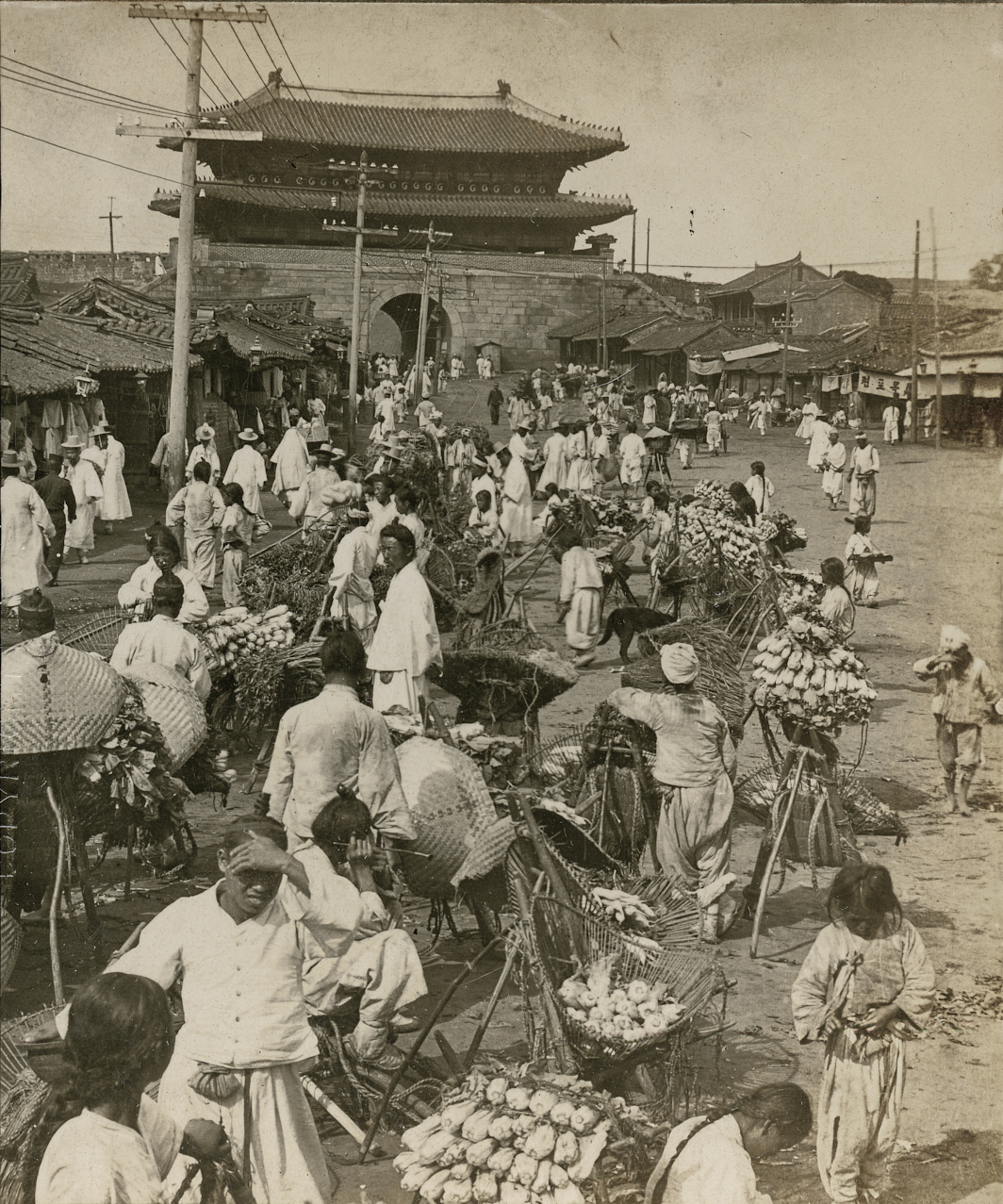
In a predecessor to Namdaemun Market in 1904. Most people are wearing white.

Winter clothes were typically made using soft cotton stuffed between layers of silk. Clothes worn in the summer were made from hemp and ramie. Components of these clothes helped to form the look and style of the traditional Korean dress, hanbok.

For thousands of years, Koreans nearly exclusively wore white hanbok; this tradition is believed to have stemmed from the Three Kingdoms period. To Koreans, white traditionally symbolizes simplicity, integrity, innocence and nobility.

=== Fashion trends ===
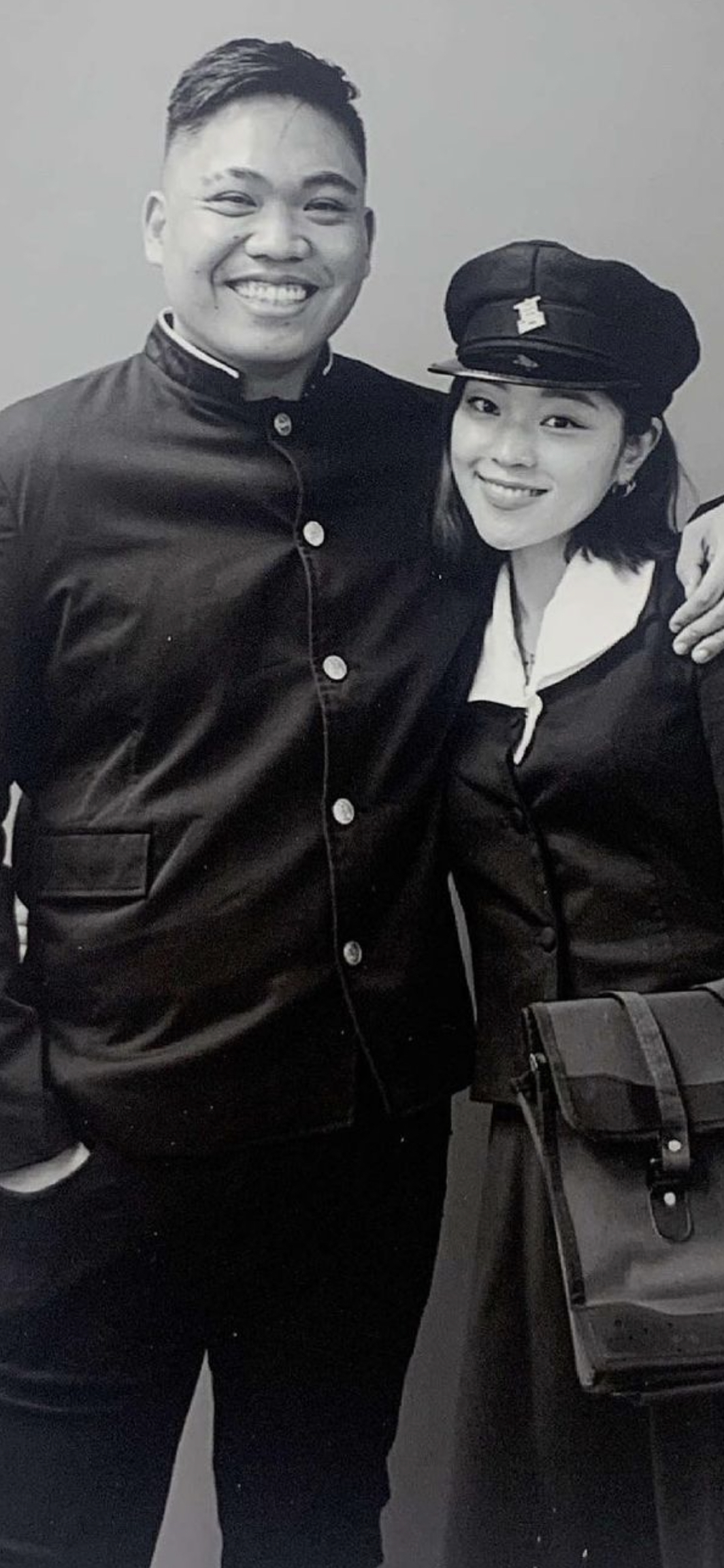
Old-fashioned school uniforms. The uniform on the left is a gakuran.

- 1950s–60s: Introduction of Western clothing into Korean culture.
- 1970s–80s: Development of ready-made clothes industry (factory-made clothing, off-the-peg).
- 1980s–90s: Organization of SFA; increased popularity of designer brands.
- Present: Internationalization of fashion; overseas expansion of Korean designer clothes.

"The South Korean fashion of today began in the late 1800s with an intertwining of western influences. Before that point, during the Joseon period (1392-1897), the Korean hanbok was the typical fashion choice. Hanboks consisted of a blouse and loose-fitting pants or skirt. For women, they wore a jeongi (blouse or jacket) and a chima (skirt); and men wore jeongi and baji (pants). Hanboks were everyday wear with lavish versions worn by the elite. During this period, makeup was made from natural materials and traditionally simple. However, by the late 1800s with the arrival of westerners and Japanese influence, Korean fashion and makeup began to lose its traditional style and elements."

=== Fashion industry overview ===
- 1917–1919: Textile industry opens; Joseon Textile Corporation and Kangsung Textiles are established and a labor-intensive industry with inexpensive workforce begins.
- 1960: Labor-intensive industry changes when the first mass-producing corporations appear.
- 1970: Beginning of the women's clothing industry; minority designers make female ready-made suits in small boutiques.
- 1972–1977: Major companies participate in making ready-made clothes (there is an automatic increase in the quality of clothing).
- After 1970s: Because of increased GNP and the social debut of women, more diverse women's clothing begins to appear.
- 1980–1982: Advent of color TV; school uniform and hairstyle regulations impact fashion in South Korea.
- 1986–1988: Hosting of Asian Games and 1988 Summer Olympics increases development of sport clothing brands.
- 1997: Fashion industry declines in the IMF.
- 1999: Fashion industry recovers (high class materials with famous brands increasingly noticeable).
- Present: Government support and public attention leads to growth of designer fashion; Korean fashion industry is establishing its position in the world.

=== Fashion shows ===
- 1955: An official name-designer was used primarily in South Korea; authorized designers are Norano Soo-kyung Seo, Young-ae Kim (kor : 노라노, 서수경, 김영애).
- 1958: First fashion contest opens.
- 1962: First international fashion show.
- 1964: Second fashion contest opens.
- 1966: Korean fashion show opens in South-East Asia expo.
- 1969: KAFDA (Korean Designers in New York Association) is established.
- 1970: Korean fashion show opens in Japan at Expo '70.
- 1972: Farmer fashion show opens in the community development research society and KPD (Busan Designer Association) is established.
- 1983: First competitive exhibition for textile and fashion design opens.
- 1987: Ssangbangul (kor: 쌍방울) opens; first multidisciplinary cloth fashion show.
- 1990: S.F.A.A collection openshttps, and designer Sin-woo Lee participates in Tokyo collection; fashion in South Korea becomes widely known thanks to the Tokyo collection.
- 1992: Daejeon expo uniform festival opens and Korean designers go overseas.
- 1993: Korean designers participate in prêt-à-porter (ready-to-wear fashion) in Paris.
- Present: South Korean designers hold Korean fashion shows in many countries, often showcasing Korean styles.
- 2011: Hanbok fashion show was held in Seoul, South Korean. Hanbok is as considered the traditional clothing for Korean custom.

== Designers ==
In the early 1990s, designer Lee Shin-Woo participated in the Tokyo Collection. Lee, Lee Young-Hee, Jin Tea-Ok, Hong Mi-Wha, and others participated in the pret-a-porter in Paris. Korean designers appeared actively on the global stage, with their designs being shown all over the world. The Korean government started to encourage talented designers. By the end of the 1990s, the encouragement of talented designers declined due to the currency crisis. Lately, the government has supported designers, and also ones who are less successful in the domestic economy are beginning to advance abroad.

- Moon Young-Hee is a designer who expresses Korean ideas in a modernistic way. By the end of the 1960s, she had worked as a designer in Wha Shin Renaun, and founded the 'Moon boutique' ready-made clothing brand in 1974. In 1992, she founded the 'Moon Young Hee' designer brand.
- Andre Kim (24 August 1935 (Gyeonggi-do Goyang-si) – 12 August 2010) was a South Korean fashion designer based in Seoul, South Korea. He was known predominantly for his evening and wedding gown collections.
- Lie Sang-Bong is a major fashion designer who shows Korean fashions in pret-a-porter, which is the core of the global fashion industry. Lie graduated from the Seoul Institute of the Arts and made his debut as a fashion designer in 1983 when he won a prize in the Central Design Contest. In 1993, he gained attention from the Korean fashion community by presenting his first collection, 'The Reincarnation', at Seoul Fashion Week. He was later nominated as "Best Designer of the Year" in 1999 by the Mayor of Seoul. Finally, in 2002 he made his debut in Paris and launched his first title, 'The Lost Memoir'. In 2006, Lie Sang-Bong held his place as a global designer, showing hangeul design clothes for the first time, and has provided custom designs for Yuna Kim. Lie Sang-Bong is emerging as an 'influential designer' since the death of Andre Kim.
- Steve J & Yoni Pare married designers. They make witty and characteristic clothes. They held their 2013 FW Collection on 27 March 2013 (4:00 pm) in Yeuido IFC. The theme of Steve J & Yoni P's 2013 FW collection is 'Classic Meet Punk'.
- Designer Lee Suk-Tae graduated from L'ecole de la Chambre Syndicale de la Couture Parisienne and L'ecole de studio berco in Paris. He was selected in a young French designers' contest in Paris and has worked in the Paris headquarters of Sonia Rykiel and Christian Dior. He launched his own brand in 1997 and was invited by the Korean Fashion Association to present a collection at Hong Kong Fashion Week. He has since inaugurated his own store in Gangnam and been selected as one of Seoul's "10 Soul Designers".
- Andersson Bell is a Korean designer brand that is rising in popularity and whose clothing is inspired by both Korean and Scandinavian cultures. This brand is selling well in the European market and is also placed in the Net-A-Porter online shopping platform.

== Supertalent Fashion Week ==
Supertalent Fashion Week, is a clothing trade show to be held globally, represents Supermodel Influencers of Supertalent of the World, photographers, art directors and stylists, producing fashion events in several countries. Its organizers collaborate with industry organizations and work with local and national governments. it was held Seoul to Eiffel Tower of Paris, Ferrari Auto of Modena, Cannes, Milan, Venice, Rome, positioned world leader of Supermodel Influencer. It was held at the Korea International Exhibition Center, Daegu Textile Complex, Incheon International Airport, South Korea, Eiffel Tower, Galeries Lafayette, Paris, Jungfrau, Schilthorn, Switzerland

=== Seoul Fashion Week ===
The Seoul Fashion Week is a global fashion event held twice a year in the Spring/Summer and Fall/Winter seasons. Started in 1987 it is sponsored by the city of Seoul and conducted by Inotion World Wide. The Fashion Weeks are held in March and October in South Korea, and are followed by shows in New York City, Paris, London and Milan. The event is marked with inclusivity and diversity, combining high fashion with street style. The Seoul Fashion Week is split into three parts:

1. The Seoul Collection: A high-end Korean fashion event. The collection is among some of the biggest in Korean fashion.
2. Generation Next is an upcoming fashion design program for Korean designers. It concentrates on designers with fewer than 5 years of experience. Unique appearance and creative thinking are emphasized in this section.
3. The Seoul Fashion Fair is an exhibition showcasing Korean fashion companies. Its mission is to grow Korean fashion companies by helping to build business partnerships to compete in the global fashion market. It is easy for companies to get a spot at the fair.

=== Korea Fashion Design Contest ===
The Korea Fashion Design Contest looks for fresh and rising design talent in Korea. This contest began in 1983, and it has been supported by the Korean government since 2004 for its promotion of new designers. The contest aims to:

1. Find promising new Korean designers.
2. Provide strategic and systematic mentoring, advertising and marketing support to these designers.
3. Showcase Korean fashion on an international scale, to show the world that Korean fashion is a high-value industry.

=== Korea Style Week 2013 ===
Korea Style Week was an exhibition at COEX in Korea in 2013. It combined a fashion show format with that of a fair for the first time in Korea. This was done to make it easy to find new designers and fashion online. Korea Style Week was an opportunity for companies to introduce the public to their products. This was done by creating events like styling classes, runways, flea markets, etc.

=== K-Pop: K-Collection in Seoul Fashion Concert ===
The K-Collection was last held on 11 March 2012, at the Olympic Stadium in Seoul. The event was hosted by the Korea Tourism Organization, and featured performances by K-Pop artists such as MBLAQ, Infinite, Big Bang, IU, Girls' Generation, and Miss A. The fashion show featured (among others) collections by 2PLACEBO, 8seconds, Kappa, and Skin Food.

== K-pop and the fashion world ==
=== 2ne1 Fashion Wave ===
2NE1 introduced high-end fashion labels such as Givenchy and Balmain to the Korean audience. According to Harper's Bazaar, "Korean style is a mix of streetwear and luxury". They further highlight that the trend is combining European brands and streetwear brands together.

=== Blackpink and Mulberry ===
Lisa and Rose, members of the popular girl group Blackpink, were featured on the September issue of Dazed Korea. Their ensemble was created from pieces from Mulberry's 2018 Fall/Winter collection. In addition, they sat in the front row at this year's Mulberry Show in Seoul. The objective of Johnny Coca, the creative director of the major British fashion house, was not only to make Mulberry a prominent brand in the UK but also to garner international recognition in places such as South Korea. In an article by Vogue, Coca states that "Korea was the second (biggest) country in terms of revenue so it was important to be part of that expansion and to communicate more about the brand and its heritage to the Korean customer".

=== Winner and Burberry ===
Another famous British fashion house, Burberry, was featured by Mino and Hoony, two members of the popular K-pop group Winner. They were dressed in the Burberry Spring/Summer 2018 collection for the brand's show. Furthermore, they received early access to the Spring 2018 collection as soon as they landed in England. According to an article in Vogue, "The two wore full looks while enjoying their time around London, sharing multiple images of themselves in pieces that are sure to be among the seasons most coveted. While sharing snapshots of tartan tote bags and classic trenches, the pair also managed to squeeze in a little sightseeing..."

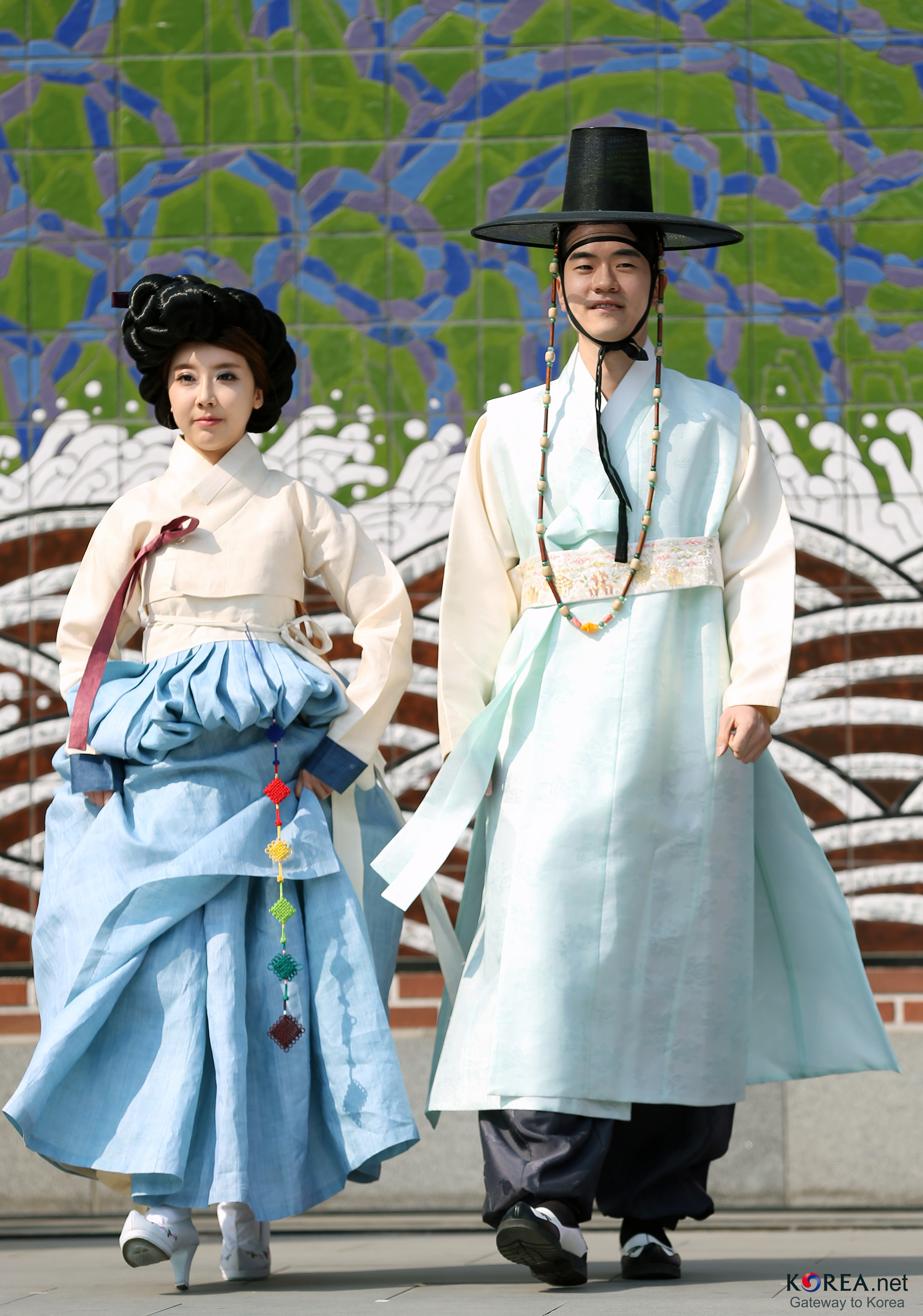
Hanbok, traditional Korean-styled clothes

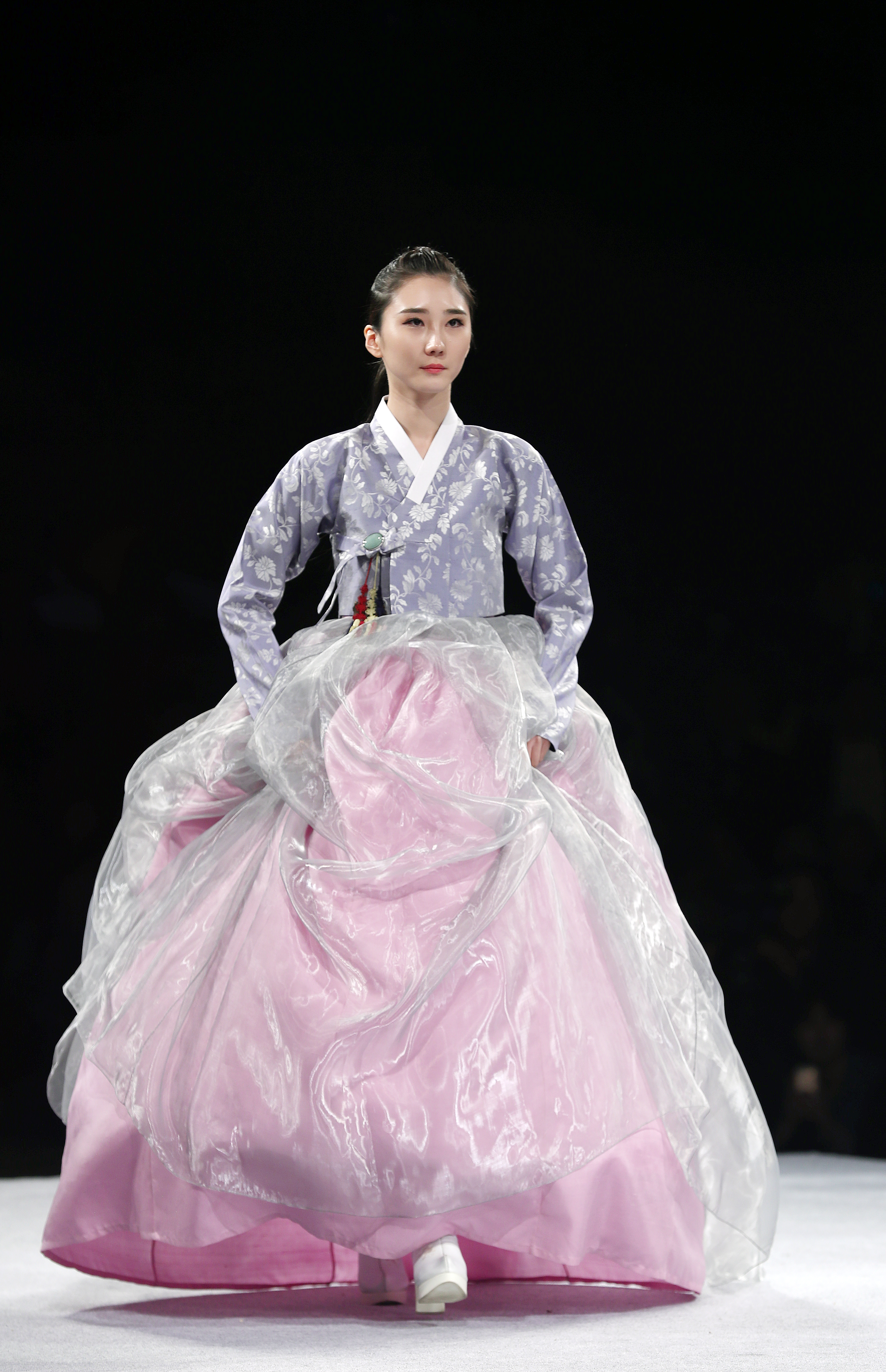
Hanbok

== See also ==
- Miss Supertalent Fashion Week
- List of Korean clothing
- Shopping in Seoul
- André Kim
- E-Land Group
- List of Korean online fashion retailers
