= Kim Min-chul =

Kim Min-chul may refer to:

- Kim Min-chul (wrestler)
- Kim Min-chul (actor)
