= Veiled Cup =

International singing competition in South Korea

Veiled Cup 베일드 컵

Dates and venue
- Auditions: August – December 2025
- Preliminary round: January 11, 2026 (part 1) January 18, 2026 (part 2)
- Semi-finals: January 18, 2026 (part 1) January 25, 2026 (part 2)
- Final: February 1, 2026
- Venue: SBS Prism Tower; Seoul, South Korea

Organisation
- Organiser: Seoul Broadcasting System (SBS)

Production
- Director: Lee Hong-hee
- Presenters: Lee Da-hee

Participants
- Number of entries: 26 (from 9 countries)
- Number of finalists: 5
- Debuting countries: China; Indonesia; Japan; Laos; Mongolia; Philippines; South Korea; Thailand; Vietnam

Vote
- Voting system: Pre-final rounds: 100% professional judging panel; Final: 50% professional judging panel, 20% live broadcast voting, 20% cumulative global online voting and 10% music platform voting
- Winning musician: Philippines; Arabelle Dela Cruz as "Laguna Diva"

Veiled Cup (Korean: 베일드 컵), formerly named Global Veiled Musician (Korean: 글로벌 베일드 뮤지션) was the third edition of the South Korean singing competition series Veiled Musician, and the first edition of the international version of the series that took place in South Korea, with the final held on February 1, 2026. Nine countries participated, with the preliminary round and semi-final results being decided by a professional judging panel, while the winner was decided by votes from both the professional judging panel and the viewing public. The show was hosted by Lee Da-hee.

Organized by the Seoul Broadcasting System (SBS) and produced by Prism Studios, the show was split into four episodes and broadcast on SBS TV from January 11 to February 1, 2026, with the preliminary and semi-final rounds being pre-recorded and the final being broadcast live.

The winner was Laguna Diva from the Philippines, whose identity was revealed to be Arabelle Dela Cruz.

== Background ==
The show was first launched in 2018, under the name Blind Musician, but was rebranded as Veiled Musician for its second season in 2023. It is a web series that was released on YouTube, as well as on V Live, Naver TV and Wavve.

On May 9, 2025, it was announced that the show would expand outside of South Korea, under the brand Global Veiled Musician (later retitled Veiled Cup), and would feature representatives from Asian countries. Several media outlets, including The Korea Herald and the Asia-Pacific Broadcasting Union (ABU), have described the project as the "Asian version of the Eurovision Song Contest", mainly due to its similar concept of nations competing in a music competition.

== Format and production ==
Veiled Cup was directed by Lee Hong-hee and produced by Prism Studios, SBS's in-house non-fiction production company. It was filmed at the SBS Prism Tower in Sangam-dong, Mapo District, Seoul, South Korea.

The show was set around the premise of stripping contestants of all their personal identifiers, apart from the voice, and finding the best singer, with more identifiers being revealed as the show progressed. Contestants would perform their songs behind a white circular veil, with their only known identifiers being their hometown and their nickname.

Apart from a trophy, the winner of Veiled Cup would also be given numerous opportunities, including participation in a pan-Asia tour, an appearance on SBS's music program Inkigayo and a contribution to the original soundtrack (OST) of a Korean drama.

=== Voting system ===
During the preliminary round, the judging panel was given a "fail" button, which the judges would press to determine a contestant's fate in the show. The criterion for the preliminary round was as follows:

- If none of the judges pressed the button during the contestant's performance, the silhouette light would remain white and the contestant would advance to the semi-finals.
- If one or two of the judges pressed the button, the light would turn yellow (if one judge pressed the button) and/or red (if two judges pressed the button), putting the contestant's advancement to the semi-finals on hold.
- If three or more judges pressed the button, the light would turn off and the contestant is eliminated from the round.

Participants who advanced in all pre-final rounds may only answer one question from behind the veil following their performance, while participants who were eliminated would be asked to go on stage outside of the veil to reveal their identities. Meanwhile, participants who were put on hold from advancing in the semi-finals would wait without their information being disclosed. Should the number of semi-finalists be less than fifteen, the judging panel would discuss and select additional semi-finalists among the participants put on hold. However, should the number of semi-finalists exceeded fifteen, an additional elimination round would be held, where the judging panel would discuss and make additional eliminations in order to reach the fifteen semi-finalists limit. Once fifteen semi-finalists are selected, the participants on hold are eliminated.

The format for the semi-finals was a "Veiled Triple Match", where five "mission songs" (specifically selected English-language songs) would be performed by the semi-finalists, who would be randomly placed in teams of three to perform the song together. Only one participant in each team would advance to the finals, which would be decided by the judging panel.

For the finals, the overall winner of Veiled Cup was decided by a combination of a vote from the judging panel and a public vote, wherein audiences would vote for their winner through the LiNC app or through the voting section of the show's official playlist on Spotify, which featured original songs recorded by the participants credited under their respective stage names in the show. The criterion for voting in the grand final is as follows:

- Professional judging panel (50%)
- Live broadcast votes (20%)
- Cumulative global online votes (20%)
- Music platform votes via Spotify (10%)

=== Host and judging panel ===
Veiled Cup panelists and host

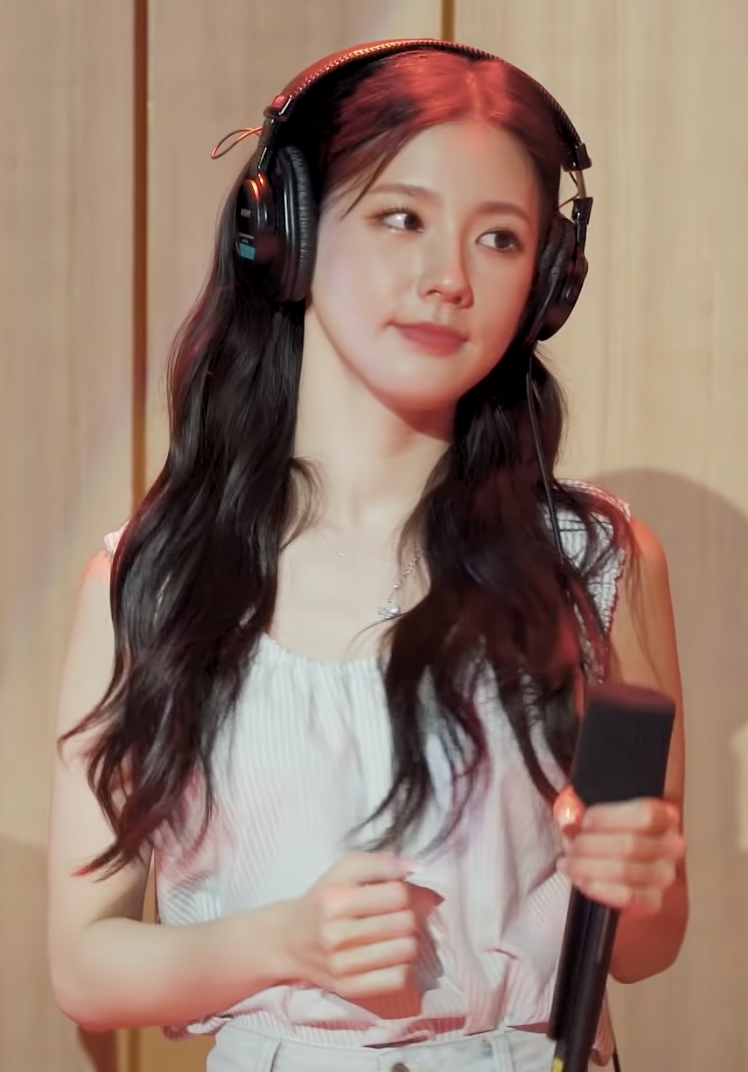
Miyeon

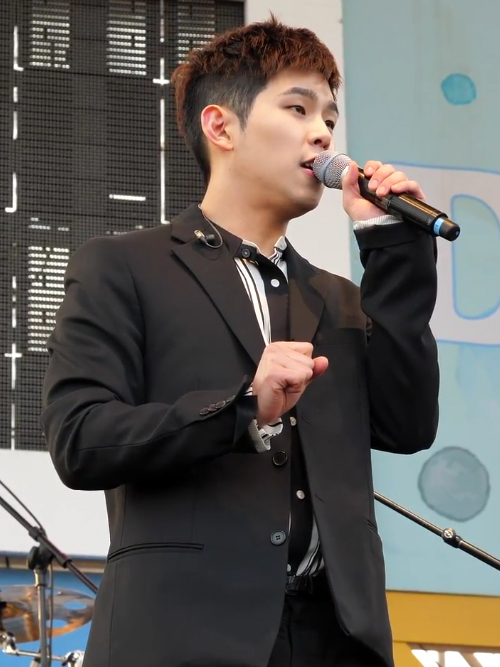
Paul Kim

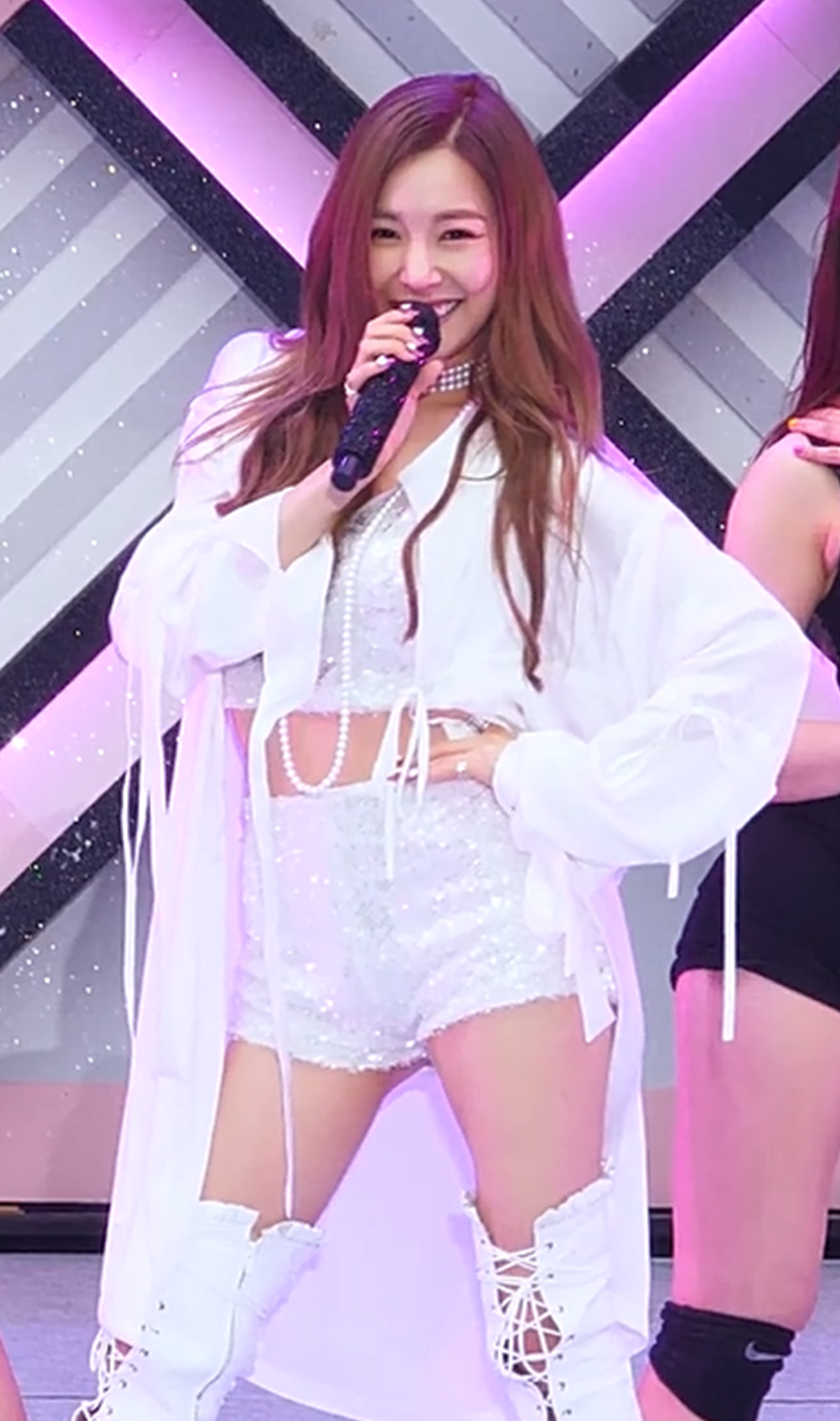
Tiffany Young

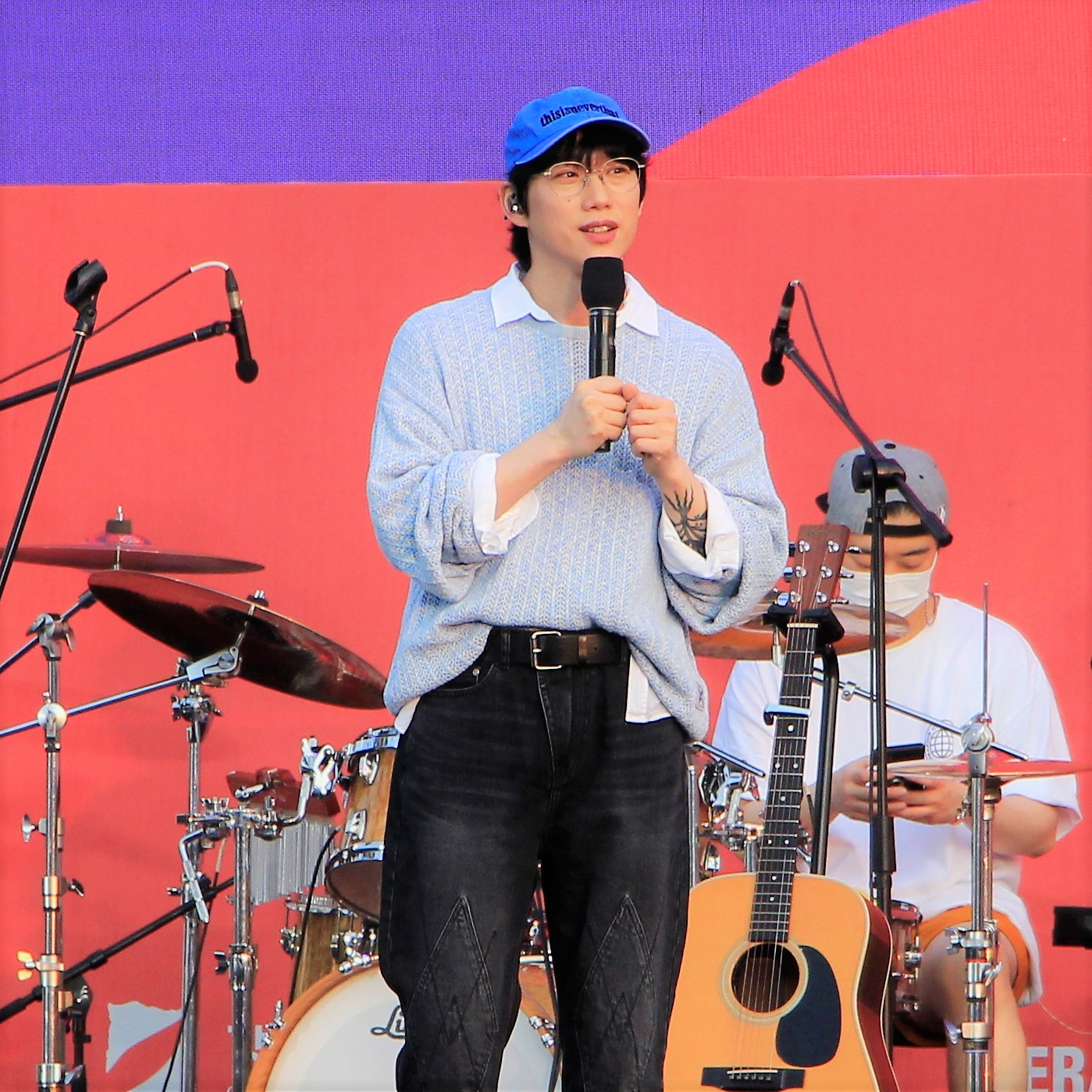
Kwon Jung-yeol (10cm)

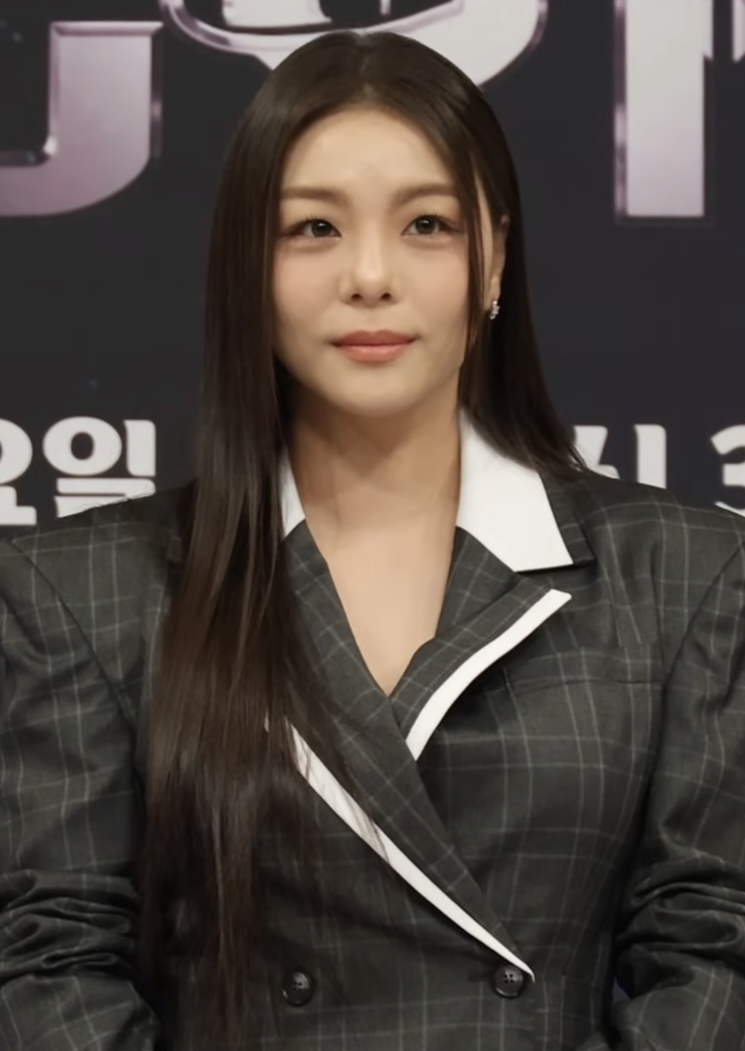
Ailee

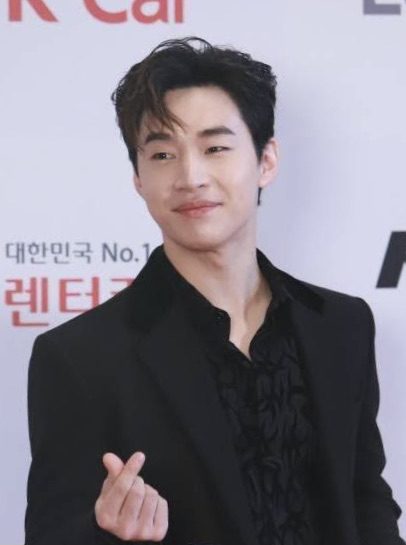
Henry

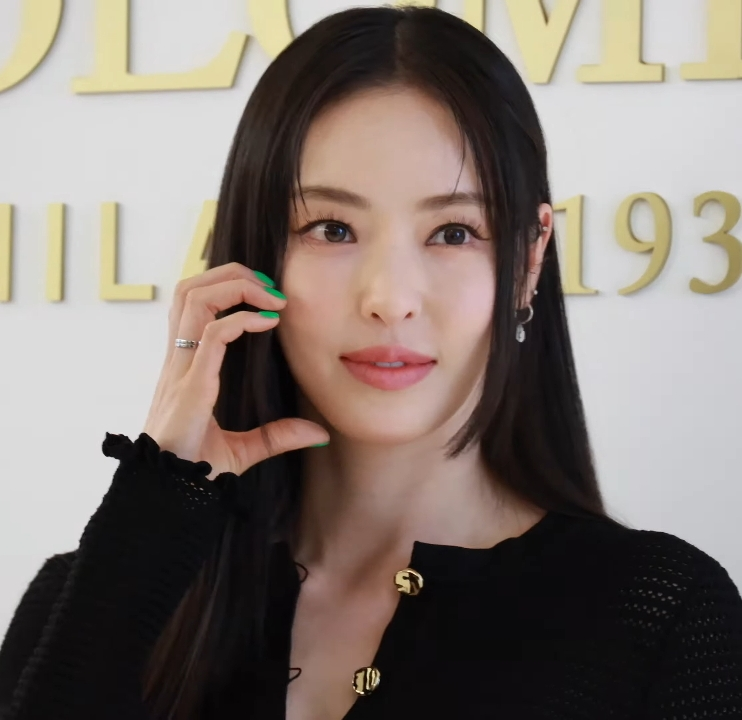
Lee Da-hee

South Korean actor and radio personality Choi Daniel was initially announced as the show's presenter on July 12, 2025. On January 5, 2026, it was announced that actress and model Lee Da-hee would be the new host of Veiled Cup. Choi would instead host Veiled Musician, the South Korean national selection show for Veiled Cup released on Netflix from November 12 to December 31, 2025.

The show also featured a judging panel composed of well-known performers. On July 12, 2025, the first round of members of the judging panel were announced, which included singers Paul Kim, Shin Yong-jae, Ahn Ji-young (the sole member of the South Korean musical act BOL4), and Belle of Kiss of Life. The second round of judges were announced on July 23, 2025, which included Kwon Jung-yeol (the sole member of the musical act 10cm), American singer-songwriters Tiffany Young and Ailee, and Canadian singer-songwriter Henry. On October 24, 2025, it was announced that singer Miyeon of I-dle would be added to the judging panel of Veiled Cup.

On January 5, 2026, the final judging panel for Veiled Cup was announced, with Miyeon, Paul Kim, Tiffany Young, 10 cm, Ailee and Henry completing the panel. Shin Yong-jae, Ahn Ji-young and Belle would instead become part of the judging panel for Veiled Musician, along with Paul Kim, Ailee, and Kihyun of Monsta X.

== List of participants ==
Nine countries participated in Veiled Cup. Audition rounds were held in each participating country from August to December 2025. Three contestants were selected from each country to proceed to the preliminary round of the contest in South Korea, with the exception of Indonesia, which only sent two contestants.

In June 2025, Cambodia, Malaysia, Myanmar, Singapore and Taiwan were initially announced as participating countries. However, on November 11, 2025, the aforementioned countries did not appear in promotional materials, while China was added to the list of participants.

Veiled Cup participants
Country	Contestants		Song (Note: The song which is used by the public in order to vote for the contestant via Spotify.)	Ref.
Country	Stage name	Identity	Song	Ref.
China	Haining Moonlight	Yang Linfeng	"Staggering" (蹒跚)	
China	Shanghai Twist	Dicey	"A Soliloquy in the Light" (火光里的独白)	
China	Beijing Deok	Liu Yixin	"Wake Up"	
Indonesia	Borneo Mamamia	Natalia	"My Love in This Life and the Next" (Pacar Dunia Akhirat)	
Indonesia	Jakarta Freedom	Saniya	"An Unexpected Encounter" (Pertemuan Tak Terduga)	
Japan	Osaka Sunny	Sora	"When I Grow Up" (大人になったら)	
Japan	Tokyo Trainee	Jung Young-uk	"Ballad of A Singer" (歌うたいのバラッド)	
Japan	Tokyo Honey Voice	Daisuke Utsumi	"I Believe"	
Laos	Vientiane Cupid	Napha	"We'll Never Be in Love" (ບໍ່ມີວັນຈະໄດ້ຮັກກັນ)	
Laos	Vientiane Red Hair	Jimmy	"In the End" (ສະຫຼຸບວ່າ)	
Laos	Vientiane Siren	Aoy	"800 Million" (800ລ້ານ)	
Mongolia	Ulaanbaatar Cherry Bomb	D. Ariunzaya	"Diva"	
Mongolia	Ulaanbaatar Gobi Bear	B. Bilguun	"Dream" (Zuud)	
Mongolia	Ulaanbaatar Korean	E. Tuguldur	"Nice to Meet You" (Taniltsay)	
Philippines	Zambales Beast	Garrett Bolden	"Our Love"	
Philippines	Manila Storyteller	Thea Astley	"Wishful Thinking"	
Philippines	Laguna Diva	Arabelle Dela Cruz	"Wake Up"	
South Korea	Gyeongsang-do Iron Voice	Kim Da-mi	"Unrequited Love" (짝사랑)	
South Korea	Gyeonggi-do Cotton Candy	Lee Ju-yeon	"All About You" (그대라는 시)	
South Korea	Seoul Thirty-One	Park Da-hyun	"On That Day" (그날에 나는 맘이 편했을까)	
Thailand	Bangkok Makdung	Tappicha Kitipanungkun	"Mercury" (ปรอท)	
Thailand	Bangkok Soul Man	Topsie Thanaphat	"Ain't It A Shame"	
Thailand	Phang Nga Bay Fighter	Naratcha Dokkating	"All or Nothing"	
Vietnam	Ho Chi Minh Moana	Unknown	"Believe it or Not" (Tin Hay Không Tin)	
Vietnam	Ho Chi Minh Entertainer	Unknown	"One Minute" (1 Phút)	
Vietnam	Ho Chi Minh Serenade	Rachel Fang	"Look Into Your Eyes" (Nhìn Vào Mắt Em)	

== Contest overview ==
=== Auditions ===
Auditions in each country took place from August to December 2025, held through nationally televised competitions. Three contestants from each country would advance to the preliminary round of Veiled Cup in South Korea.

On August 29, 2025, Cambodian public broadcaster National Television of Cambodia (TVK) announced that it would organize Veiled Musician Cambodia, which would select the Cambodian contestants for Veiled Cup. The program was not materialized and Cambodia was not included in the show's official list of participating countries.

Veiled Cup national selection shows
Country	National selection	Broadcaster	Judging panel		Host(s)	Date(s)	Ref.
Country	National selection	Broadcaster	Main judges	Guest judge(s)	Host(s)	Date(s)	Ref.
China	Unknown						
Indonesia	Veiled Musician Indonesia	RTV	Lullaboy; Novia Bachmid; Tiwi T2	Paul Kim	Jevier Justin	September 21 – November 2, 2025	
Japan	Veiled Musician Japan	Tokyo MX	Back Kooyoung; Chay; Kohmi Hirose; Oshira; Tsukasa Saito	Miyeon; Paul Kim	Ryo Fukawa	November 20 – December 18, 2025	
Laos	Veiled Musician Laos	YouTube	JoJo Miracle; Lala Soudthida; Sanonh Maniphonh; Taiy Akard; Tee Oudalay	Henry	Mitpasa Boudsavong	August 29 – November 24, 2025	
Mongolia	Veiled Musician Mongolia	MNB	B. Enkhsaikhan; Doid; E. Ganbolor; J. Ariunjargal; NMN; Tempo; Tsetse	Ailee	B. Gerelee	September 13 – October 14, 2025	
Philippines	Veiled Musician Philippines (part of All-Out Sundays)	GMA Network	Julie Anne San Jose; Mark Bautista; Rita Daniela	Tiffany Young	Gabbi Garcia; Rayver Cruz	November 9, 2025	
South Korea	Veiled Musician	Netflix	Ahn Ji-young; Ailee; Belle; Kihyun; Paul Kim; Shin Yong-jae	none	Choi Daniel	November 12 – December 31, 2025	
Thailand	Veiled Musician Thailand	WeTV	Perawat Sangpotirat; Rangsan Panyaruen; Sudkhate Jungcharoen; Wichayanee Pearklin	Chawarin Perdpiriyawong; Tiffany Young	Thanawat Prasitsomporn	January 9, 2026	
Vietnam	Veiled Musician Vietnam	HTV7	Unknown				

=== Preliminary round ===
The preliminary round was broadcast on January 11 and 18, 2026. All twenty-six selected participants participated, fifteen of whom would advance to the semi-final round. However, only eighteen performances were broadcast.

As the judging panel had selected seventeen contestants to advance to the semi-finals (exceeding the limit of fifteen semi-finalists), an additional elimination round was held where two contestants would be eliminated. The contestants were divided into three groups based on their ranking in their respective national selection shows, with one being eliminated from each group. Ultimately, two contestants under the Top 3 group were eliminated, while no contestant in the Top 1 and Top 2 groups were removed.

Thailand was named as the MVP Country after all three of its participants qualified for the semi-finals. Initially, Thailand tied with South Korea for the distinction as all three participants from the latter nation also qualified. However, Thailand was selected after considering the number of "fail" votes between the Thai participants and the South Korean participants, wherein Thailand received no "fail" votes.

Preliminary round
#	Country	Stage name	Song	Identity	Result
First half (January 11, 2026)
1	Thailand	Phang Nga Bay Fighter	"Fallin'" by Alicia Keys	undisclosed	Advanced to semi-finals
2	Philippines	Zambales Beast	"Nothing's Gonna Change My Love for You" by George Benson	undisclosed	Advanced to semi-finals
3	South Korea	Gyeonggi-do Cotton Candy	"I Feel Love" by Thama	undisclosed	Advanced to semi-finals
4	Mongolia	Ulaanbaatar Korean	"Love Always Runs Away" (사랑은 늘 도망가) by Lee Moon-sae	E. Tuguldur	Eliminated
5	Indonesia	Jakarta Freedom	"Love and Let Go" by Raisa	undisclosed	Advanced to semi-finals
6	China	Haining Moonlight	"The Moon Represents My Heart" (月亮代表我的心) by Teresa Teng	undisclosed	Advanced to semi-finals
7	Thailand	Bangkok Soul Man	"Mack the Knife" by Bobby Darin	undisclosed	Advanced to semi-finals
Second half (January 18, 2026)
8	South Korea	Gyeongsang-do Iron Voice	"If I Leave" (나 가거든) by Sumi Jo	undisclosed	Advanced to semi-finals
9	Philippines	Laguna Diva	"If I Ain't Got You" by Alicia Keys featuring Usher	undisclosed	Advanced to semi-finals
10	Laos	Vientiane Red Hair	"Love.. That Guy" (사랑..그 놈) by Bobby Kim	undisclosed	Advanced to semi-finals
11	Laos	Vientiane Siren	"Bloodsucker" by Cil	undisclosed	Advanced to semi-finals
12	South Korea	Seoul Thirty-One	"Once While Living" (살다가 한번쯤) by 4Men	undisclosed	Advanced to semi-finals
13	Indonesia	Borneo Mamamia	"My Destiny" by Lyn	undisclosed	Advanced to semi-finals
14	Japan	Tokyo Honey Voice	Unknown	undisclosed	Advanced to semi-finals
15	Japan	Tokyo Trainee	"Rush Hour" by Crush featuring J-Hope	undisclosed	Advanced to semi-finals
16	Japan	Osaka Sunny	"Wherever You Are" by One Ok Rock	undisclosed	Advanced to semi-finals
17	Vietnam	Ho Chi Minh Serenade	Unknown	undisclosed	Advanced to semi-finals
18	Thailand	Bangkok Makdung	"Rise Up" by Andra Day	undisclosed	Advanced to semi-finals

Preliminary elimination round (January 18, 2026)
Country	Stage name	Identity	Result
Top 1 Group
All participants under the Top 1 group advanced to the semi-finals
Top 2 Group
All participants under the Top 2 group advanced to the semi-finals
Top 3 Group
Thailand	Phang Nga Bay Fighter	undisclosed	Advanced to semi-finals
Philippines	Zambales Beast	undisclosed	Advanced to semi-finals
South Korea	Seoul Thirty-One	undisclosed	Advanced to semi-finals
Japan	Tokyo Honey Voice	Daisuke Utsumi	Eliminated
Laos	Vientiane Siren	undisclosed	Advanced to semi-finals
Vietnam	Ho Chi Minh Serenade	Rachel Fang	Eliminated

==== Other eliminated contestants ====
The performances of the following participants were not included in the main broadcast of Veiled Cup. It is assumed that they were either put on hold or eliminated from the show. The songs performed by some of the eliminated contestants were mentioned during the first half of the preliminary round broadcast on January 11, 2026.

As their performances were not broadcast, most of their identities remained unknown, except for some contestants whose identities were revealed by local media.

Other eliminated contestants of Veiled Cup
Country	Stage name	Song	Identity
China	Beijing Deok	"Some" by Soyou and Junggigo featuring Lil Boi of Geeks	Liu Yixin
China	Shanghai Twist	Unknown	Dicey
Laos	Vientiane Cupid	Unknown	Napha
Mongolia	Ulaanbaatar Cherry Bomb	"Batter Up" by Babymonster	D. Ariunzaya
Mongolia	Ulaanbaatar Gobi Bear	Unknown	B. Bilguun
Philippines	Manila Storyteller	Unknown	Thea Astley
Vietnam	Ho Chi Minh Moana	"Cheer Up" (산다는 건) by Hong Jin-young	Unknown
Vietnam	Ho Chi Minh Entertainer	Unknown	Unknown

=== Semi-finals ===
The semi-final round was broadcast on January 18 and 25, 2026. Fifteen contestants participated, five of whom would advance to the finals. South Korean singer-songwriter Jinyoung joined the judging panel as a guest judge.

The semi-finals consisted of a "Veiled Triple Match", where five "mission songs" would be performed by the participants, who were randomly placed in teams of three to perform the song together, with only one member of each team advancing to the finals. As Thailand was awarded the MVP Country at the preliminary round, the Thai participants were given the opportunity to select which of the five "mission songs" they want to perform.

After being eliminated, Zambales Beast (Garrett Bolden) and Jakarta Freedom (Saniya) performed an encore performance of their mission song "Alone" on stage along with their teammate and finalist Bangkok Soul Man, who performed from behind the veil.

Semi-final round
Team	Country	Stage name	Song	Identity	Result
A (January 18, 2026)	China	Haining Moonlight	"Love, Maybe" (사랑인가 봐) by MeloMance	Yang Linfeng	Eliminated
A (January 18, 2026)	Laos	Vientiane Red Hair	"Love, Maybe" (사랑인가 봐) by MeloMance	undisclosed	Advanced to finals
A (January 18, 2026)	Thailand	Bangkok Makdung	"Love, Maybe" (사랑인가 봐) by MeloMance	Tappicha Kitipanungkun	Eliminated
B (January 18 and 25, 2026)	South Korea	Gyeonggi-do Cotton Candy	"Happy Me" (행복한 나를) by ECO	Lee Ju-yeon	Eliminated
B (January 18 and 25, 2026)	Indonesia	Borneo Mamamia	"Happy Me" (행복한 나를) by ECO	Natalia	Eliminated
B (January 18 and 25, 2026)	Thailand	Phang Nga Bay Fighter	"Happy Me" (행복한 나를) by ECO	undisclosed	Advanced to finals
C (January 25, 2026)	Japan	Osaka Sunny	"Playing with Fire" by Blackpink	Sora	Eliminated
C (January 25, 2026)	South Korea	Gyeongsang-do Iron Voice	"Playing with Fire" by Blackpink	undisclosed	Advanced to finals
C (January 25, 2026)	Japan	Tokyo Trainee	"Playing with Fire" by Blackpink	Jung Young-uk	Eliminated
D (January 25, 2026)	Philippines	Laguna Diva	"Starting With You" by Maktub	undisclosed	Advanced to finals
D (January 25, 2026)	South Korea	Seoul Thirty-One	"Starting With You" by Maktub	Park Da-hyun	Eliminated
D (January 25, 2026)	Laos	Vientiane Siren	"Starting With You" by Maktub	Aoy	Eliminated
E (January 25, 2026)	Philippines	Zambales Beast	"Alone" (홀로) by Jung Key featuring Kim Na-young	Garrett Bolden	Eliminated
E (January 25, 2026)	Indonesia	Jakarta Freedom	"Alone" (홀로) by Jung Key featuring Kim Na-young	Saniya	Eliminated
E (January 25, 2026)	Thailand	Bangkok Soul Man	"Alone" (홀로) by Jung Key featuring Kim Na-young	undisclosed	Advanced to finals

=== Final ===
The final took place on February 1, 2026. Five contestants participated, and the winner was decided by a combination of votes from the judging panel and the audience. Unlike the preliminary and semi-final rounds, which were pre-recorded, the final was broadcast live. Henry did not appear in the judging panel for unknown reasons.

Instead of performing from behind the veil, the finalists performed their songs on stage with only their silhouettes visible. After performing, all of the finalists revealed their respective identities one by one on stage and performed "Mama" by Jung Key featuring Gu Yoon-hoe, Han Ye-seul, Shin Jong-wook and Kim Na-young.

Laguna Diva from the Philippines, whose identity was revealed as Arabelle Dela Cruz, won the competition with a total score of 7,137 points, also winning the judging panel vote, live broadcast vote and music vote. Phang Nga Bay Fighter from Thailand, whose identity was revealed as Naratcha Dokkating, came second with a total of 6,064 points and won the cumulative global online vote.

Final round (February 1, 2026)
#	Country	Stage name	Song	Identity	Result
1	Thailand	Phang Nga Bay Fighter	"Don't You Worry 'bout a Thing" by Stevie Wonder	Naratcha Dokkating	Runner-up
2	Philippines	Laguna Diva	"Feeling Good" by Michael Bublé	Arabelle Dela Cruz	Winner
3	Laos	Vientiane Red Hair	"Creep" by Radiohead	Jimmy	Fifth place
4	South Korea	Gyeongsang-do Iron Voice	"If We Ever Meet Again" (다시 만날 수 있을까) by Lim Young-woong	Kim Da-mi	Fourth place
5	Thailand	Bangkok Soul Man	"That's What Friends Are For" by Dionne & Friends (Note: Composed of Dionne Warwick, Elton John, Gladys Knight and Stevie Wonder.)	Topsie Thanaphat	Third place

== Detailed voting results ==
=== Semi-finals ===
Detailed judging panel votes of the semi-final of Veiled Cup
Team	Country	Stage name	Miyeon	Jinyoung	P. Kim	T. Young	10cm	Ailee	Henry	Total
A	China	Haining Moonlight	No	No	No	No	No	No	No	0
A	Laos	Vientiane Red Hair	Yes	Yes	Yes	Yes	Yes	No	No	5
A	Thailand	Bangkok Makdung	No	No	No	No	No	Yes	Yes	2
B	South Korea	Gyeonggi-do Cotton Candy	No	No	No	No	No	No	Yes	1
B	Indonesia	Borneo Mamamia	Yes	Yes	No	No	No	No	No	2
B	Thailand	Phang Nga Bay Fighter	No	No	Yes	Yes	Yes	Yes	No	4
C	Japan	Osaka Sunny	No	No	No	No	No	No	No	0
C	South Korea	Gyeongsang-do Iron Voice	Yes	Yes	Yes	Yes	Yes	Yes	Yes	7
C	Japan	Tokyo Trainee	No	No	No	No	No	No	No	0
D	Philippines	Laguna Diva	Yes	Yes	Yes	Yes	Yes	Yes	No	6
D	South Korea	Seoul Thirty-One	No	No	No	No	No	No	No	0
D	Laos	Vientiane Siren	No	No	No	No	No	No	Yes	1
E	Philippines	Zambales Beast	No	No	No	Yes	No	No	No	1
E	Indonesia	Jakarta Freedom	Yes	No	No	No	No	Yes	No	2
E	Thailand	Bangkok Soul Man	No	Yes	Yes	No	Yes	No	Yes	4

=== Final ===
Winner

Split results
Draw	Country	Stage name	Judging panel (Note: Converted score)	Public voting			Total	Place
Draw	Country	Stage name	Judging panel	Live broadcast	Global online cumulative	Music platform	Total	Place
1	Thailand	Phang Nga Bay Fighter	4,570	629	761	104	6,064	2
2	Philippines	Laguna Diva	4,850	1,034	544	709	7,137	1
3	Laos	Vientiane Red Hair	4,540	90	168	19	4,817	5
4	South Korea	Gyeongsang-do Iron Voice	4,690	108	201	47	5,046	4
5	Thailand	Bangkok Soul Man	4,510	136	323	119	5,088	3

Detailed judging panel votes of the final of Veiled Cup
Draw	Country	Stage name	Miyeon	P. Kim	T. Young	10cm	Ailee	Total
1	Thailand	Phang Nga Bay Fighter	95	90	97	90	85	457
2	Philippines	Laguna Diva	97	98	100	95	95	485
3	Laos	Vientiane Red Hair	92	82	96	90	94	454
4	South Korea	Gyeongsang-do Iron Voice	94	90	99	93	93	469
5	Thailand	Bangkok Soul Man	92	92	94	88	85	451

== Special awards ==
In addition to the main winner's trophy and prize opportunities, two awards were contested during the show, namely the MVP Country and Best Listeners' Choice.

The award for MVP Country is given to the country with the most participants who qualified to the semi-finals in the preliminary round. Participants from the MVP Country would receive a benefit that would grant them an advantage in the semi-finals, which is later revealed to being able to select amongst the five "mission songs" they want to perform in the semi-finals. In the event of a tie where more than one country have the most participants, the country whose qualified participants received the fewest "fail" buttons pushed by the judging panel would be selected for the award. Thailand was selected as the MVP Country after a tie-breaker with South Korea as all three participants from both nations qualified for the semi-finals.

The award for Best Listeners' Choice was decided by the audience through a vote conducted via the voting section of the show's official Spotify playlist from January 11 to 29, 2026. The winner for the award was never revealed.

MVP Country	Best Listeners' Choice
Thailand	Unknown

== Broadcast ==
The show was broadcast in South Korea on SBS TV from January 11 to February 1, 2026, where the show was split into four episodes. The first three episodes were pre-recorded and broadcast at 16:30 KST, with the first episode focusing entirely of the first half of the preliminary round and the second episode focusing on the second half of the preliminary round (including the preliminary elimination round) and the first half of the semi-finals. Meanwhile, the third episode focused entirely on the second half of the semi-finals. The final round, which served as the fourth and final episode, was broadcast live at 16:10 KST, twenty minutes earlier than its original scheduled time.

In the Philippines, GMA Network (which produced and aired the Philippine national selection show for Veiled Cup) broadcast the final on a delayed basis on March 7, 2026, at 16:45 PHT as part of a documentary television special titled The Veiled Cup: Galing ng Pinoy, wherein it was edited for time, broadcast with English subtitles and interspersed with clips of Arabelle Dela Cruz describing her experience before, during and after the show.
