= Miyeon =

South Korean singer and actress (born 1997)

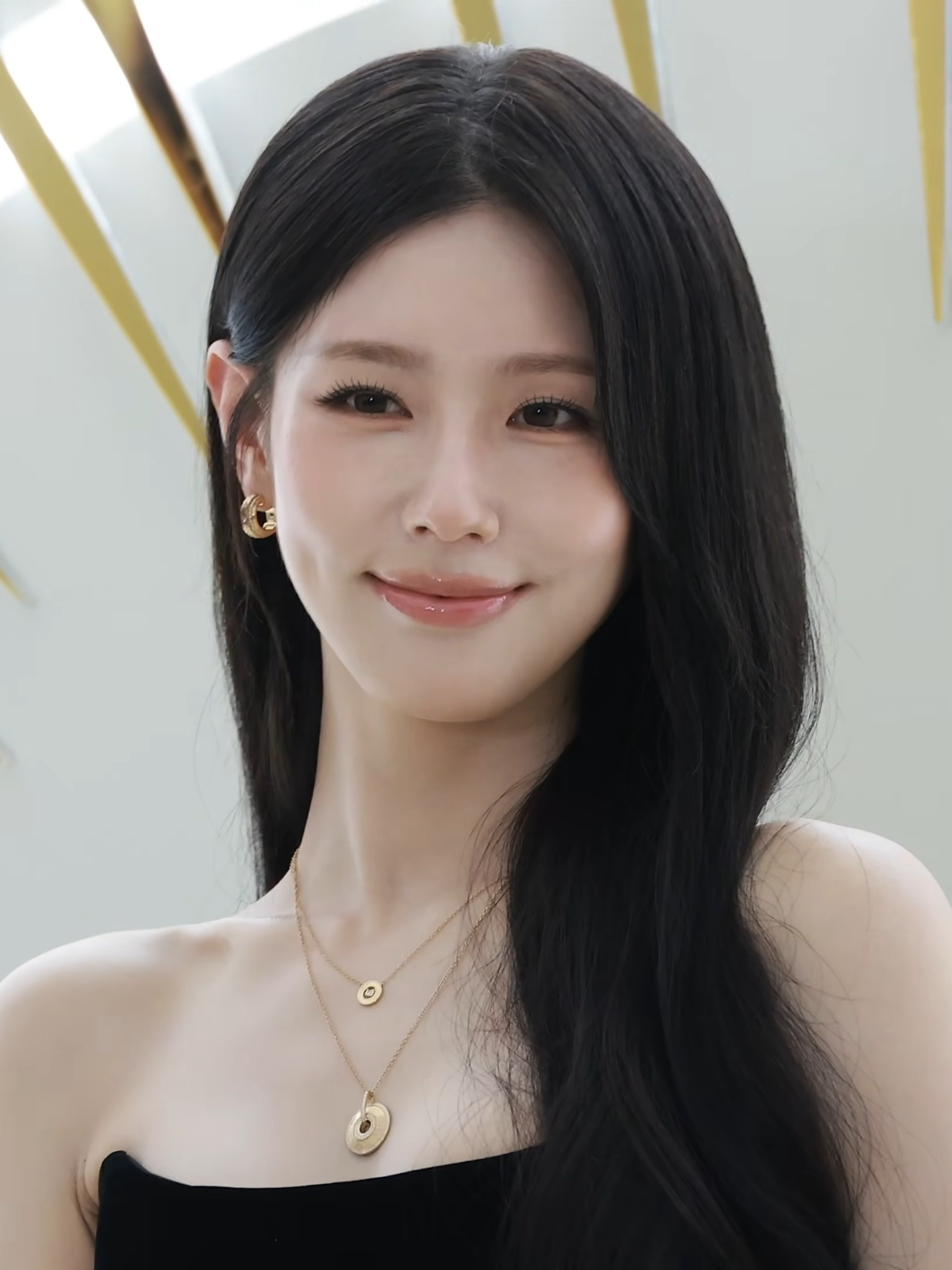
- Miyeon in August 2026
- Born: Cho Mi-yeon; January 31, 1997 (age 29); Incheon, South Korea
- Occupations: Singer; actress; TV host; model
- Musical career
- Genres: K-pop; dance-pop; R&B
- Instrument: Vocals
- Years active: 2018–present
- Label: Cube
- Member of: I-dle; K/DA; United Cube

Korean name
- Hangul: 조미연
- RR: Jo Miyeon
- MR: Cho Miyŏn

Cho Mi-yeon (Korean: 조미연; born January 31, 1997), better known mononymously as Miyeon, is a South Korean singer and actress. She is a vocalist of the South Korean girl group I-dle under Cube Entertainment, and voiced Ahri in the virtual K-pop girl group K/DA.

== Early life ==
Cho Mi-yeon was born on January 31, 1997. She is an only child. Miyeon showed a strong interest in singing since she was a child. Her love for music was inspired by her father. Miyeon's parents soon recognized her passion and sent her to music schools to learn various skills, such as violin, guitar, and piano. She eventually auditioned for YG Entertainment in middle school and went on to spend the next five years as a trainee. However, her debut was thwarted and she left the company.

Miyeon continued to pursue music as she signed up for a music academy to strengthen her vocal skills, as well as learning to compose and produce music. Miyeon spent about one year as a trainee before debuting with (G)I-dle.

== Career ==
=== 2016–2018: Pre-debut activities ===
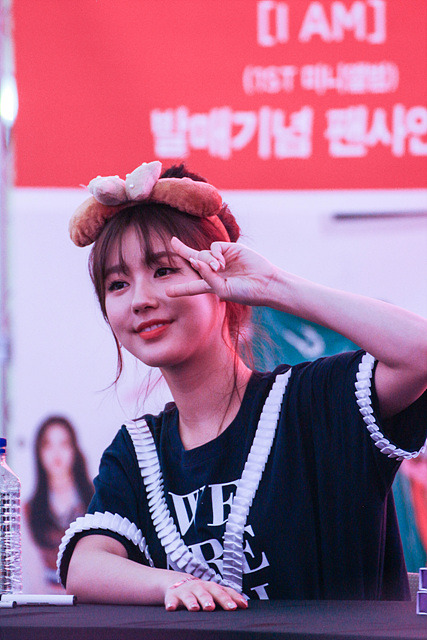
Miyeon during a fan signing event in 2018

In early 2017, Miyeon became a trainee at Cube Entertainment. Before joining Cube, she was a freelance singer and appeared as an associate singer with Lim Seul-ong in Urban Zakapa's Canada Tour in September 2016. In 2017, she appeared in a small part in Lim Seul-ong's "You" music video.

=== 2018–2020: Debut with (G)I-dle, collaborations and acting debut ===
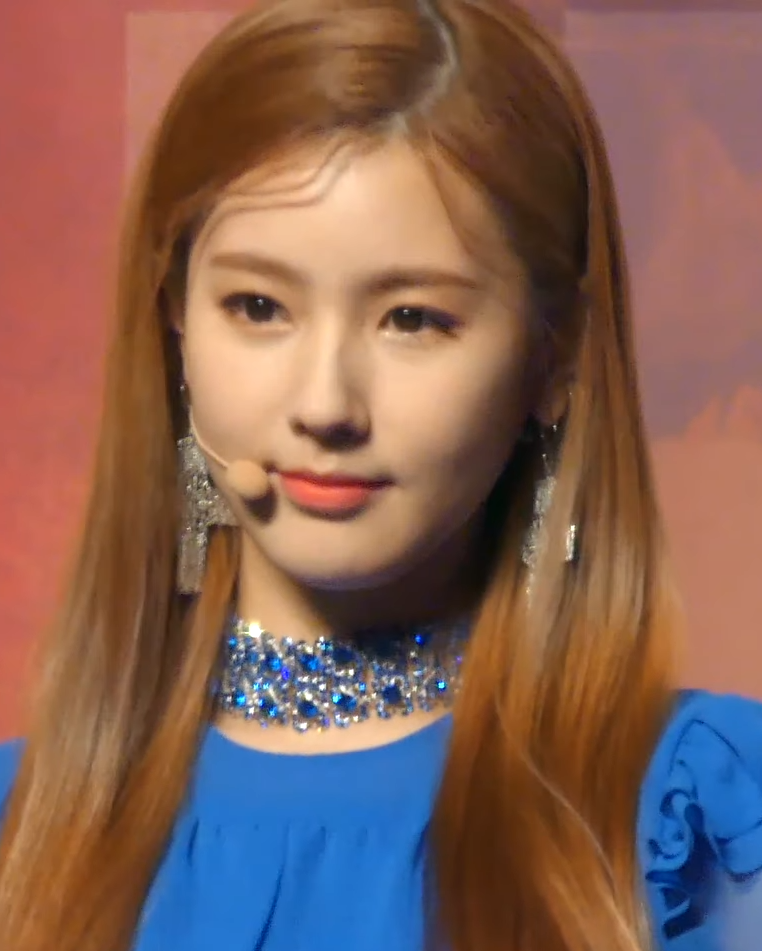
Miyeon at "I Made" Showcase in 2019

Miyeon debuted with (G)I-dle on May 2, 2018, with their first EP I Am and the lead single "Latata".

On October 26, 2018, it was confirmed that Miyeon would perform at the League of Legends World Finals Opening Ceremony 2018, along with Soyeon, Madison Beer and Jaira Burns. The four singers provided vocals for the virtual K-pop girl group K/DA, with Miyeon voicing Ahri, one of the most well known champions in the League of Legends. Together with Evelynn voiced by Beer, Ahri is the main vocalist of the group. Their song "Pop/Stars" went viral on YouTube and topped Billboard's World Digital Songs chart.

In 2019, Miyeon collaborated with Hangzoo with the song "Cart" as part of Amoeba Culture X Devine Channel Code Share Project.

In 2020, Miyeon appeared on MBC's music competition program King of Mask Singer. She went on to win the first round with 64 points. In the second round, she performed Yoon Mi-rae's "Goodbye Sadness and Hello Happiness" but lost to Im Kang-sung. Her vocal performance received a warm reception from both audience and panels. Miyeon's voice was described as smokey, but soulful. Also that year, Miyeon sang again as Ahri on two songs from K/DA's EP, All Out; lead single "The Baddest" with Bea Miller and Wolftyla replacing Beer and Burns, and the second single "More" with the original line-up and Lexie Liu.

In September 2020, it was revealed that Miyeon would make her acting debut as the female lead in web-drama Replay: The Moment as Yoo Hayoung, a popular YouTuber and band vocalist. With the drama's musical nature, Miyeon released several OSTs for it: "Dreaming About You" and "How To Love (with Neon Paprika)". The drama went on and recorded more than 6 million cumulative views.

In October 2020, Miyeon sung "We Already Fell In Love" together with Minnie as part of Do Do Sol Sol La La Sol soundtrack, and in November, Miyeon released her first solo OST "My Destiny" as part of Tale of the Nine Tailed soundtrack.

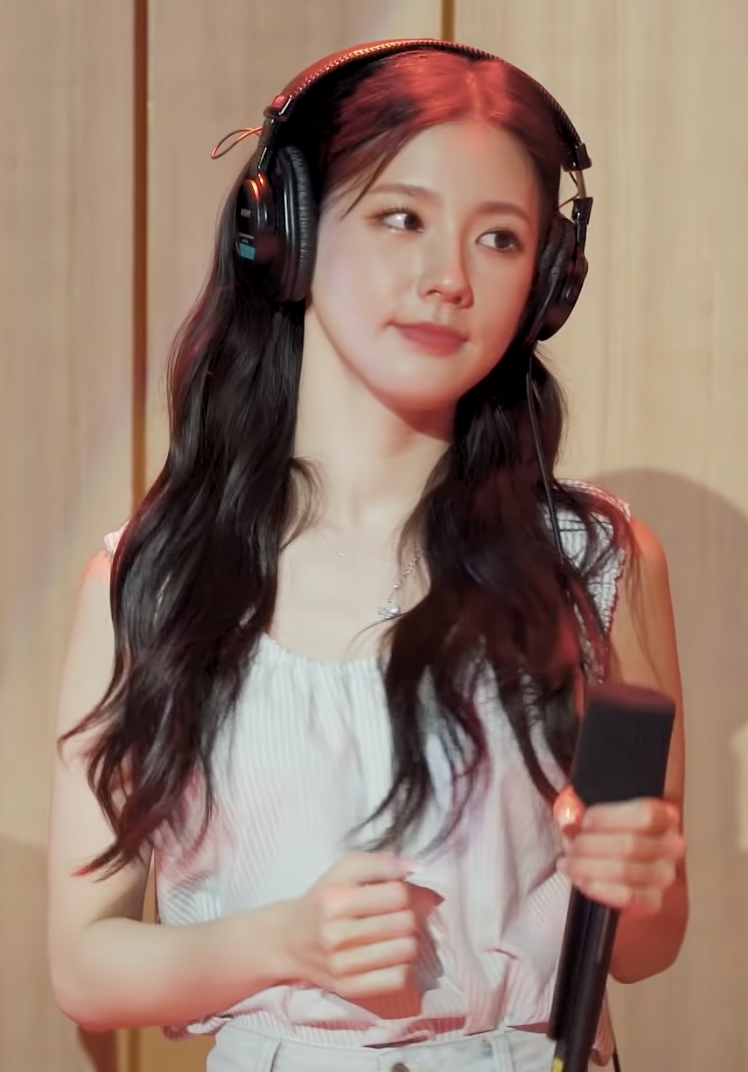
Miyeon at SBS Power FM's Cultwo Show on August 6, 2020

On November 30, 2020, Miyeon appeared in Seoul Connects U, a variety travel show jointly planned and produced by MBC and Seoul Tourism Foundation. The program shows a time slip trip in the same space and at different times to global fans by linking the past and present of Seoul through photos of stars and fans in real-time.

=== 2021–present: DJ host, M.C and solo endeavors ===
In February 2021, it was announced that Miyeon was chosen to be the main host of Naver Now radio program Gossip Idle (Korean: 소문의 아이들), hosting the radio weekly every Tuesday at 8 pm from February 9. The radio show was initially aired as a trilogy to commemorate the comeback of (G)I-dle's fourth EP I Burn in January, but due to the response from fans, it has returned to the official live show. In the same month, Miyeon was appointed as one of the new hosts of Mnet's music program M Countdown, a position which she held from February 18 with actor Nam Yoon-su. She became the first female MC on the program in 9 years. On the day of their first broadcast, the pair prepared a special stage as they sang a duet song "Dream" by Suzy and Baekhyun. At the end of the month, Miyeon succeeded in making the list of Korean Business Research Institute's monthly "Individual Girl Group Members Brand Power Ranking" at number 3 with an increase of 96.20% behind Blackpink's Jennie and Rosé.

In May 2021, Miyeon appeared on Kingdom: Legendary War as a hidden card to help BtoB's "Blue Moon (Cinema Ver)" No Limit stage. The stage was presented as a musical-like stage with the concept of the movie La La Land and Once Upon a Time in Hollywood with Miyeon's role caught in a love storyline between Minhyuk and Changsub.

On May 28, Korean media news shared that Miyeon participated in CS Happy Entertainment's cs numbers album with "You Were My Breath" (Korean: 너는 나의 숨이였다), a pop-ballad song played by a 60-member orchestra including Joseph K, who created Paul Kim's "Me After You" and guitarist Park Shin-won. The song is produced by Rocoberry who produce the 2017 hit song "I Will Go to You Like the First Snow". The album is produced by Jeon Chang-sik, the CEO of CS Happy Entertainment recognized Miyeon's potential and lived up to his expectations with her unrivalled singing skills that have not been revealed yet in (G)I-dle. With one day of tracking, it debuted at number 96 on Gaon Download Chart and number 20 on the component BGM Chart.

In August 2021, Maeil Business Newspaper reported that Miyeon would be acting alongside The Penthouse: War in Life actor Lee Tae-vin in the action comedy web series Delivery, which was released in November 2021. She is to play the role of Kwak Doo-sik, a delivery girl who is well versed in martial arts. The singer is said to appear in this web drama to help local small and medium-sized enterprises during difficult times due to COVID-19 in the Gyeonggi Province and the production staff stated, "to look forward to wire action from Cho Mi-yeon".

In October 2021, Miyeon released a collaboration with Raiden on his first EP, Love Right Back, with the lead single "Side Effect" released on October 11. It was described as a medium-tempo synth-pop song with witty lyrics that expresses the emotions felt by the person in love as a side effect. She also co-featured on Lee Donghae's B-side track, "Blue Moon", which was released on October 13. The same day, she was confirmed to star in the upcoming pink comedy web series Adult Trainee as Bang Ye-kyung alongside Ryu Ui-hyun. On November 17, 2021, Miyeon was featured in rapper Kid Milli's "Kitty".

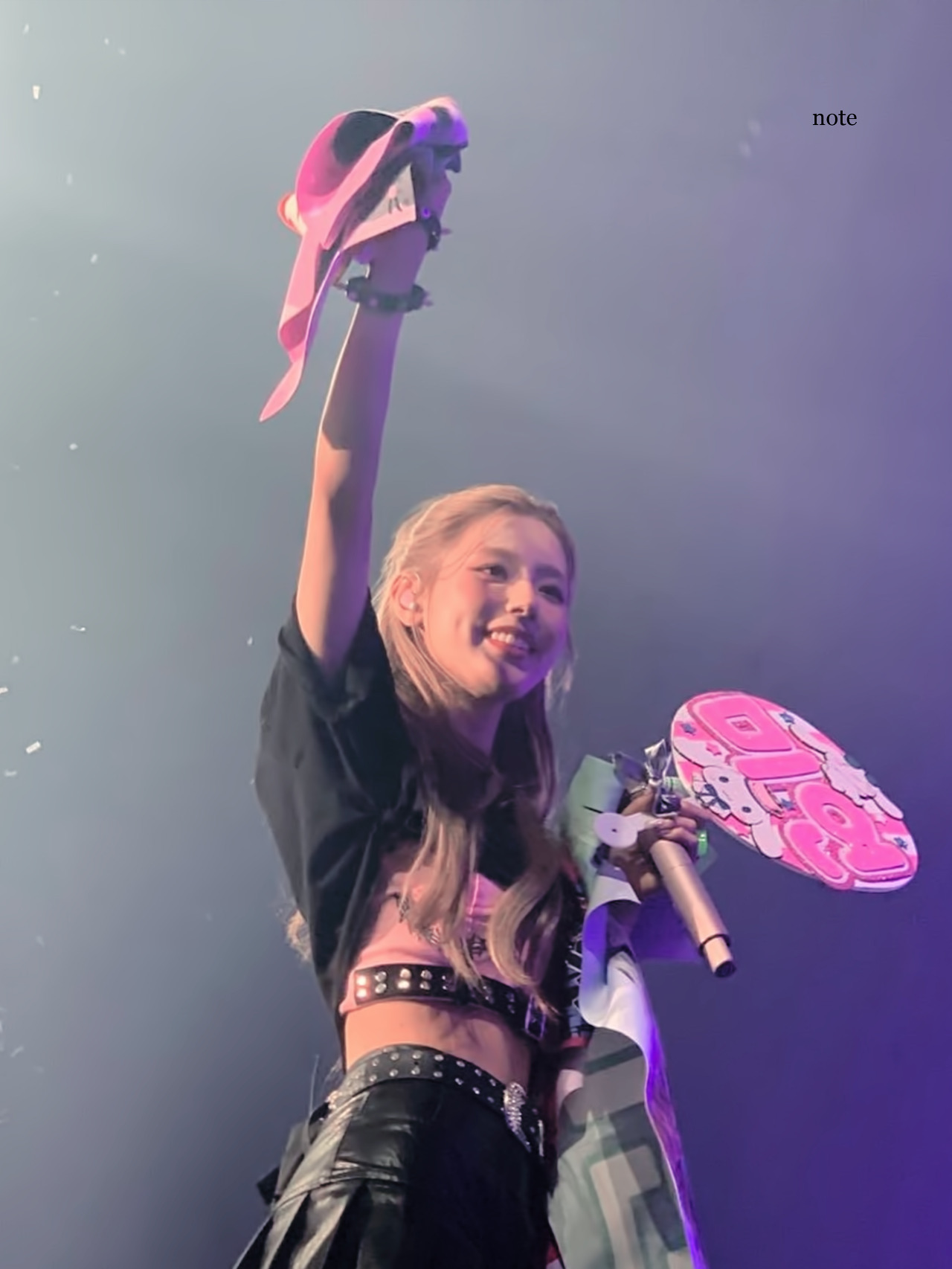
Miyeon at "Just Me ( )I-dle" World Tour in 2022

On April 6, 2022, it was announced that Miyeon would make her solo debut at the end of April. On April 8, 2022, Cube Entertainment announced that her first EP My, would be released on April 27, including the lead single "Drive". Miyeon won her first music program trophy at SBS MTV's The Show on May 3.

On September 5, 2023 Yuqi and Miyeon released the single "How to Twerk" as part of the soundtrack of the Mnet dance competition show Street Woman Fighter 2. On November 16, it was announced that Miyeon would step down as MC for M Countdown after serving for 1000 days, becoming the longest-serving MC on M Countdown.

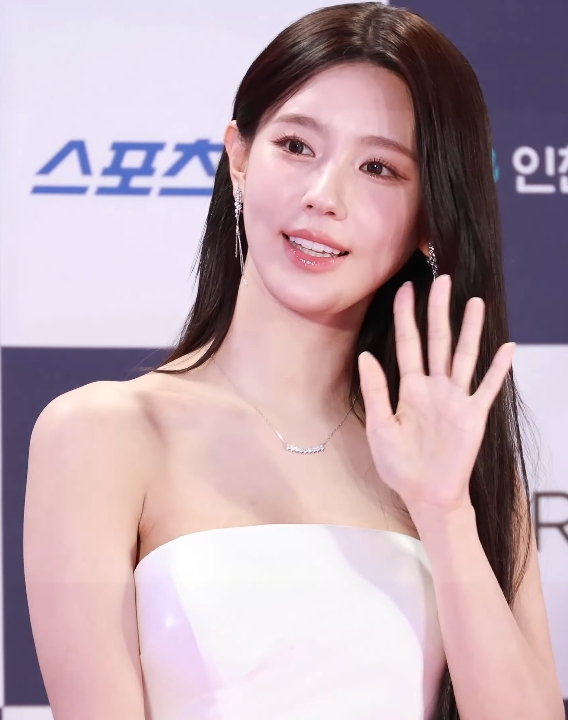
Miyeon attending the Blue Dragon Series Awards in 2024

On August 28, 2025, Miyeon released the digital single "Sky Walking", which was her first self-composed song and previously revealed in 2024 through her solo performance on (G)I-dle's I-dol world tour. On October 20, Cube Entertainment announced that Miyeon would be releasing her second EP, My, Lover, on November 3. The pre-release single "Reno", featuring singer-songwriter Colde, was released on October 28.

On August 10, 2026, Miyeon released her first Japanese single "Run Away". On October 6, Miyeon would making return to acting in the teen psychological thriller web series Bitch x Rich: Royal Camp, portraying as Cha Se-mi, which expected to air in 2027.

== Endorsements ==
In August 2022, Miyeon became a brand ambassador for South Korean beauty brand Espoir. In October, she became a muse for South Korean skincare brand Bewants. In February 2023, she became the muse for the South Korean brand J.Estina handbag alongside bandmate Minnie.

In March 2023, she was selected as a muse for fashion brand City Breeze. In May, she appeared as a muse for Jill Stuart Beauty. In August 2023, Miyeon was announced as a global brand ambassador for Jimmy Choo. The following month, she was appointed as a model for Shenyang soju. In March 2024, Miyeon became a brand muse for the CJ Olive Young beauty brand Wakemake.

== Discography ==
=== Extended plays ===
List of extended plays, showing selected details, selected chart positions, and sales figures
| Title | Details | Peak chart positions | Sales |
| Title | Details | KOR | Sales |
|---|---|---|---|
| My | Released: April 27, 2022; Label: Cube, Kakao; Formats: CD, digital download, streaming | 4 | KOR: 113,911 |
| My, Lover | Released: November 3, 2025; Label: Cube, Kakao; Formats: CD, LP, digital download, streaming; Track listing: 1. "Reno" (featuring Colde); 2. "Say My Name"; 3. "F.F.L.Y"; 4. "Space Invader"; 5. "You and No One Else"; 6. "Petal Shower"; 7. "Show" | 3 | KOR: 198,519 |

=== Singles ===
| Title | Year | Peak chart positions | Album |
| Title | Year | KOR Circle | Album |
As lead artist
Korean
| "You Were My Breath" (너는 나의 숨이였다) | 2021 | — (Note: "You Were My Breath" did not enter the Circle Digital Chart, but debuted and peaked at number 96 on the component Circle Download Chart.) | Non-album single |
| "Drive" | 2022 | 110 | My |
| "Sky Walking" | 2025 | — (Note: "Sky Walking" did not enter the Circle Digital Chart, but debuted and peaked at number 71 on the component Circle Download Chart.) | Non-album single |
| "Reno" (featuring Colde) | 2025 | — (Note: "Reno" did not enter the Circle Digital Chart, but debuted and peaked at number 22 on the component Circle Download Chart.) | My, Lover |
| "Say My Name" | 2025 | 149 | My, Lover |
| "Bloom Again" | 2026 | — (Note: "Bloom Again" did not enter the Circle Digital Chart, but debuted and peaked at number 72 on the component Circle Download Chart.) | Non-album single |
Japanese
| "Run Away" | 2026 | — | Non-album single |
As featured artist
| "Side Effect" (Raiden featuring Miyeon) | 2021 | — | Love Right Back - The 1st Mini Album |
| "Blue Moon" (Donghae featuring Miyeon) | 2021 | — (Note: "Blue Moon" did not enter the Circle Digital Chart, but peaked at position 79 on the component Circle Download Chart.) | California Love |
| "Kitty" (Kid Milli featuring Miyeon) | 2021 | — | Non-album singles |
| "Spring Song" (봄노래) (LAS featuring Miyeon) | 2023 | — | Non-album singles |
| "Ceremony" (Soran featuring Miyeon) | 2026 | — (Note: "Ceremony" did not enter the Circle Digital Chart, but debuted and peaked at number 117 on the component Circle Download Chart.) | Non-album singles |
| "Don't Ever Say Goodbye" (Nuton featuring Miyeon) | 2026 | — | Non-album singles |
| "Lips Together" (Tiffany of SNSD ft. Miyeon of I-DLE) | 2026 | — | Edge of Calm |
Collaborations
| "Cart" (with Hangzoo) | 2019 | — | Code Share Project |
| "Glow Up" (with Jike Junyi) | 2025 | — | Non-album single |
Soundtrack appearances
| "We Already Fell In Love" (with Minnie) | 2020 | — | Do Do Sol Sol La La Sol OST Part 4 |
| "My Destiny" | 2020 | — | Tale of the Nine Tailed OST Part 8 |
| "Dreaming About You" | 2021 | — (Note: "Dreaming About You" did not enter the Circle Digital Chart, but debuted and peaked at number 73 on the Circle BGM Chart.) | Replay: The Moment OST Part 6 |
| "How to Love" | 2021 | — | Replay: The Moment OST Special Track |
| "Imagine Love" | 2021 | — | Adult Trainee OST Part 2 |
| "Someday" | 2022 | — (Note: "Someday" did not enter the Circle Digital Chart, but debuted and peaked at number 118 on the component Circle Download Chart.) | Moonshine OST Part 8 |
| "Numb" (무덤덤) | 2023 | — | Eversoul OST |
| "Sweet Dream" (with Song Yuqi) | 2023 | — (Note: "Sweet Dream" did not enter the Circle Digital Chart, but debuted and peaked at number 97 on the component Circle Download Chart.) | Love to Hate You OST Part 1 |
| "The Painted on the Moonlight" (달빛에 그려지는) | 2023 | 79 | My Dearest OST Part 4 |
| "How to Twerk" (트윌ㅋ) (with Song Yuqi) | 2023 | 85 | Street Woman Fighter 2 OST Part 2 |
| "Milestone" | 2023 | — | Elsword OST |
| "You and I" | 2024 | — (Note: "You and I" did not enter the Circle Digital Chart, but debuted and peaked at number 85 on the component Circle Download Chart.) | My Sibling's Romance OST Part 1 |
| "Swan" | 2024 | — | Stage Fighter OST Part 3 |
| "Blazing Heart" (Korean version with HOYO-MiX) | 2024 | — | Genshin Impact - Blazing Heart (Mavuika's Character Trailer Song) |
| "Red Moon" (적월) | 2025 | — | Myst, Might, Mayhem OST Part 1 |
| "When We Meet Again" (우리 우연히 만나) | 2025 | — (Note: "When We Meet Again" did not enter the Circle Digital Chart, but debuted and peaked at number 46 on the component Circle Download Chart.) | Head over Heels OST Part 5 |
| "Spring Flowers" (봄꽃) | 2026 | — (Note: "Spring Flowers" did not enter the Circle Digital Chart, but debuted and peaked at number 63 on the component Circle Download Chart.) | Spring Fever OST Part 1 |
"—" denotes releases that did not chart or were not released in that region.

=== Other charted songs ===
| Title | Year | Peak chart positions | Album |
| Title | Year | KOR Down. | Album |
|---|---|---|---|
| "Rose" | 2022 | 73 | My |
| "Te Amo" | 2022 | 79 | My |
| "Rain" (소나기) | 2022 | 80 | My |
| "Softly" | 2022 | 93 | My |
| "Charging" (featuring Junny) | 2022 | 99 | My |
| "F.F.L.Y" | 2025 | 67 | My, Lover |
| "Space Invader" | 2025 | 76 | My, Lover |
| "You and No One Else" | 2025 | 70 | My, Lover |
| "Petal Shower" | 2025 | 74 | My, Lover |
| "Show" | 2025 | 77 | My, Lover |

=== Songwriting credits ===
All song credits are adapted from the Korea Music Copyright Association's database unless stated otherwise.

| Year | Album | Song | Lyrics | | Music | |
| Year | Album | Song | Credited | With | Credited | With |
|---|---|---|---|---|---|---|
| 2022 | My | "Rain" (소나기) | Yes | — | No | —N/a |
| 2024 | 2 | "Vision" | Yes | Minnie, Roydo | No | —N/a |
| 2024 | I Sway | "Neverland" | Yes | Yuqi | No | —N/a |
| 2025 | We Are | "Unstoppable" | Yes | — | Yes | Mingtion, Anne Judith Wik, Dana |
| 2025 | Non-album single | "Sky Walking" | Yes | Paprikaa, Ron, Jane, Livy | Yes | Paprikaa, Dress, Belle, Livy |
| 2025 | My, Lover | "F.F.L.Y" | Yes | Adora, Jin-sol, Ondine, Park So-jung | No | —N/a |
| 2025 | My, Lover | "You and No One Else" | Yes | Ryo-jeong | No | —N/a |
| 2026 | Non-album single | "Run Away" | Yes | KZ, Nthonius | No | —N/a |

== Videography ==
=== Music videos ===
| Title | Year | Director(s) | Ref. |
|---|---|---|---|
| "Drive" | 2022 | Visualsfrom. | |
| "Reno" (featuring Colde) | 2025 | Unknown | |
| "Say My Name" | 2025 | Unknown | |
| "Run Away" | 2026 | Unknown | |

== Filmography ==
=== Film ===
| Year | Title | Role | Notes | Ref. |
|---|---|---|---|---|
| 2021 | Her Bucket List | Lee Hye-in | KakaoTV film | |
| 2024 | Victory | Rookie student audition | Cameo | |

=== Web series ===
| Year | Title | Role | Notes | Ref. |
|---|---|---|---|---|
| 2021 | Replay: The Moment | Yoo Ha-young | | |
| 2021 | Delivery | Kwak Doo-shik | | |
| 2021 | Adult Trainee | Bang Ye-kyung | Episode 1–2 | |
| 2027 | Bitch x Rich: Royal Camp | Cha Se-mi | | |

=== Television shows ===
| Year | Title | Role | Notes | Ref. |
|---|---|---|---|---|
| 2020 | King of Mask Singer | Contestant | As "Boiled Egg" (Episodes 243–244) | |
| 2020 | Seoul Connects U | Tour guide | with (G)I-dle's Yuqi | |
| 2021 | Alphabet Together | Cast member | Chucheok Special | |
| 2023 | HMLYCP | Cast member | | |
| 2024 | My Sibling's Romance | Cast member | | |
| 2024 | Country Life of Gen-Z | Cast member | | |
| 2026 | Veiled Cup | Judge | | |

=== Web shows ===
| Year | Title | Role | Ref. |
|---|---|---|---|
| 2021 | Love Catcher in Seoul | Host | |
| 2021 | Get It Beauty Salon | Host | |
| 2022 | Good Advertisement 2 | Host | |

=== Hosting ===
| Year | Title | Notes | Ref. |
|---|---|---|---|
| 2020 | K-Culture Festival Concert in Andong | with Jo Jung-sik and The Boyz's Sunwoo | |
| 2021–2023 | M Countdown | with Nam Yoon-su (2021–2023), Monsta X's Joohoney (2023), and Zerobaseone's Sung Han-bin (2023) | |
| 2021 | Quiz from the Stars | with Nam Chang-hee, Jo Se-ho, and Kim Hwan | |
| 2021 | 2021 Together Again, Kpop Concert | with The Boyz's Kevin and Jacob | |
| 2022–2023 | 10-Minutes PlayTime : HuMung Being with Miyeon | Google Play Korea; February 18, 2022 – February 3, 2023 | |
| 2023 | 12th Circle Chart Music Awards | with NCT's Doyoung | |
| 2024 | KCON Germany 2024 | with Hwang In-youp | |
| 2025 | 32nd Hanteo Music Awards | with Jinyoung | |
| 2025 | Mnet 30th Chart Show | with Shuhua, Leeteuk, Joohoney, and Sung Han-bin | |
| 2025 | B:My Boyz | with Dex | |

=== Radio shows ===
| Year | Title | Role | Notes | Ref. |
|---|---|---|---|---|
| 2021–2023 | Gossip Idle | Official DJ | Season 1: February 9, 2021 – July 12, 2022; Season 2: October 11, 2022 – January 10, 2023 | |

=== Music video appearances ===
| Year | Song Title | Artist | Ref. |
|---|---|---|---|
| 2025 | "永遠前夜 / Forever Eve" | TENBLANK | |

== Awards and nominations ==
Name of the award ceremony, year presented, category, nominee of the award, and the result of the nomination
| Award ceremony | Year | Category | Nominee / Work | Result | Ref. |
|---|---|---|---|---|---|
| Asian Pop Music Awards | 2022 | Best Female Artist (Overseas) | My | Nominated | |
| Blue Dragon Series Awards | 2024 | TIRTIR Popular Star Award | Miyeon | Won | |
| Blue Dragon Series Awards | 2024 | Best New Female Entertainer | My Sibling's Romance | Nominated | |
| Melon Music Awards | 2023 | Best OST | "The Painted on the Moonlight" | Nominated | |
| Mnet Asian Music Awards | 2022 | Best Female Artist | "Drive" | Nominated | |
| Seoul International Drama Awards | 2021 | Outstanding Korean Drama OST | "Dreaming About You" | Nominated | |
| Seoul International Drama Awards | 2021 | Outstanding Korean Drama OST | "We Already Fell In Love" (with Minnie) | Nominated | |
| Seoul Music Awards | 2024 | Ballad Award | Miyeon | Nominated | |
| Seoul Music Awards | 2024 | OST Award | Miyeon | Nominated | |
