= Voyager (single album) =

Single album by Kihyun
- Released: March 15, 2022
- Genre: K-pop; Pop rock; R&B
- Length: 9:09
- Language: Korean
- Label: Starship; Kakao

Kihyun chronology
Voyager (2022)	Youth (2022)

Singles from Voyager
- 1. "Voyager" Released: March 15, 2022

Voyager is the debut single album by the South Korean vocalist Kihyun. It was released by Starship Entertainment and distributed by Kakao Entertainment on March 15, 2022. The single album contains three tracks, including the title track of the same name.

== Background and release ==
On February 18, Starship Entertainment released a logo video and image that were posted on the official SNS channel of Monsta X that were revealed to be a combination of K and H, the English initials of member Kihyun, confirming his solo debut through Daum Cafe. On March 15, Kihyun held a debut showcase on Naver Now's #OUTNOW to introduce Voyager along with its title track.

The single album was released in three standard versions; Voyager, Somewhere, and The 1st Journey, along with jewel case and KiT versions. It also contains three songs; the title track "Voyager", ", (Comma)", which Kihyun participated in writing the lyrics with British singer-songwriter Etham, and "Rain".

The music video for "Voyager" was released simultaneously with the album. Kihyun described the music video as a cross-section of a dream that escapes from the same daily life in search of his own pure love of music that was gradually being lost due to reality. On March 24, Kihyun released a special clip for the song ", (Comma)".

== Composition ==
Voyager literally means "traveler" in English. It is an album that tells the story of Kihyun, who went on a trip to a new world, from a "traveler's point of view".

"Voyager" is a pop number genre with strong addictive bass and guitar sounds, that emphasizes his cool vocals, along with the rocking band sound that soothes the weary mind. It is also an exciting, high-energy song, about adventuring into the paradise he has always dreamed of, where the lyrics are about going off the grid and seeing the world, but they also reflect his personal experiences venturing into solo music. ", (Comma)" takes a slightly softer tone, using the lyrics to drive home a more personal message about constantly trying to appear like he is okay, with the pressure to perform at high levels, regardless of the mental and emotional toll, is something we all experience in the modern world. "Rain" clings on a darker, more mysterious sound than the previous two songs, describing the emotional aftermath of a painful breakup.

== Critical reception ==
Taylor Glasby of Clash described the title track as "a natural fit for Kihyun's vocal dexterity, the ability to settle into scratchy huskiness as easily as the power notes he's famous for". For the three tracks, Kathleen Nolan of American Songwriter wrote "while 'Voyager' sets the tone of a thrilling new adventure for Kihyun, ', (Comma)' and 'Rain' highlight his emotional side and strong lyrical ability".

== Commercial performance ==
The single album debuted at number six on the monthly Gaon Album Chart and sold more than 190,000 copies in its first month of release in South Korea. Kihyun also received his first Hanteo Chart Bronze Certification Plaque for achieving 135,436 copies of Initial Chodong sales in its first week of release in South Korea.

"Voyager" debuted at number 73 on the weekly Gaon Digital Chart, and at number 183 on the monthly Gaon Digital Chart, making it Kihyun's first entry on the monthly chart for digitals. For the other tracks, ", (Comma)" debuted at number 197 on the weekly Gaon Digital Chart, although "Rain" did not enter the Gaon Digital Chart, it did appear on its component Gaon Download Chart, peaking at number 28. All the three tracks also appeared on the weekly Billboard World Digital Song Sales chart, with "Voyager" debuting at number 6, "Rain" at number 8, and ", (Comma)" at number 9.

== Track listing ==
Voyager track listing
No.	Title	Lyrics	Music	Arrangement	Length
1.	"Voyager"	Lee Seu-ran	Ryan S. Jhun; Parrish Warrington; Vaughn Elsas; Hudson Thames	Ryan S. Jhun; Trackside	3:11
2.	", (Comma)"	Kihyun; Brother Su	Antti Oikarinen; Tommy Park; Etham Basden; Hautboi Rich	Antti Oikarinen	2:58
3.	"Rain"	Vacation (Makeumine Works); Amelie (Makeumine Works); Han Song-i (Makeumine Works); Lee Ji-won (Makeumine Works)	SQVARE; A. Wright; Shark	A. Wright; Shark	3:00
Total length:					9:09

== Charts ==
=== Album ===
==== Weekly chart ====
Chart performance for Voyager
Chart (2022)	Peak position
South Korean Albums (Gaon)	3

==== Monthly chart ====
Chart performance for Voyager
Chart (2022)	Peak position
South Korean Albums (Gaon)	6

==== Year-end chart ====
Chart performance for Voyager
Chart (2022)	Position
South Korean Albums (Circle)	75

=== Songs ===
==== Weekly charts ====
Chart performance for "Voyager"
Chart (2022)	Peak position
South Korea (Gaon)	73
US World Digital Songs (Billboard)	6

Chart performance for ", (Comma)"
Chart (2022)	Peak position
South Korea (Gaon)	197
US World Digital Songs (Billboard)	9

Chart performance for "Rain"
Chart (2022)	Peak position
US World Digital Songs (Billboard)	8

==== Monthly chart ====
Chart performance for "Voyager"
Chart (2022)	Peak position
South Korea (Gaon)	183

== Certification and sales ==
Certification and sales for Voyager
Region	Certification	Certified units/Sales
South Korea	—	207,362

== Release history ==
Release history and formats for Voyager
Region	Date	Format	Label
South Korea	March 15, 2022	CD; digital download; streaming	Starship Entertainment; Kakao Entertainment
Various	March 15, 2022	Digital download; streaming	Starship Entertainment; Kakao Entertainment

== See also ==
- List of K-pop songs on the Billboard charts
