= Youth (Kihyun EP) =

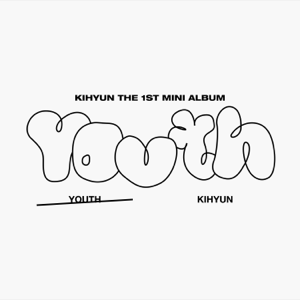
- Digital cover

EP by Kihyun
- Released: October 24, 2022
- Genre: K-pop
- Length: 17:02
- Language: Korean
- Labels: Starship; Kakao

Kihyun chronology
Voyager (2022)	Youth (2022)	Borderline (2026)

Singles from Youth
- 1. "Youth" Released: October 24, 2022

Youth is the first extended play by the South Korean vocalist Kihyun. It was released by Starship Entertainment and distributed by Kakao Entertainment on October 24, 2022. The EP contains five tracks, including the title track of the same name.

== Background and release ==
On September 30, Kihyun posted the coming image of his first EP Youth through Monsta X's official SNS, with release date announced to be on October 24, confirming his first comeback, seven months after his solo debut.

The album film was released on October 5, the tracklist on October 7, and concept films and photos between October 8 to 16. Kihyun had a comeback showcase on Naver Now's #OUTNOW to introduce Youth along with its title track.

The physical EP was released in three standard versions; Youth, Goodbye Youth, and The 2nd Journey, along with a jewel case version and a KiT version.

== Composition ==
Kim Eana wrote the lyrics for the title track "Youth" and group member Hyungwon participated in writing, composing, and arranging the tracks "Bad Liar" and "Where Is This Love", while Kihyun participated in writing the lyrics for the track "'Cause of You" alongside labelmate Brother Su.

Youth is an album that intends to revisit childhood based on the worldview of a "traveler" and started from an autobiographical story.

The title track "Youth" is an alternative rock track in which the present Kihyun tells the child Kihyun all the emotions of that time and the current promise. For the other tracks, "Bad Liar" was composed to complement Kihyun's vocals and is meant to capture that lies can coexist with the desire to get back together, "Stardust" is an up-tempo song with an energetic drum sound, "Where Is This Love" is a song that was inspired by the movie Closer, and "'Cause of You" is a song filled with sweet and refreshing feelings.

== Critical reception ==
Lai Frances of Uproxx wrote that the EP "brought nothing but nostalgia" and described the title track as "a feel-good rock pop song that invites listeners to take a trip down memory lane and remember the greatest times of our lives - our youth", with following four tracks can be interpreted as "moments in our youth where we experience feelings such as anger, heartbreak, loss, and love", while summed it all up as "a timeless masterpiece worth having on loop".

=== Listicles ===
Name of critic or publication, name of listicle, name of work, and rank
Critic/Publication	List	Work	Rank	Ref.
Album
Uproxx	The Best K-pop Albums of 2022	Youth	Placed (Note: All the albums and songs listed are either unranked or just alphabetically ranked.)	

== Commercial performance ==
Kihyun received his second Hanteo Chart Bronze Certification Plaque for achieving 114,950 copies of Initial Chodong sales in its first week of release in South Korea.

== Track listing ==
Youth track listing
No.	Title	Lyrics	Music	Arrangement	Length
1.	"Youth"	Kim Eana	Karl Morgan; Ryan S. Jhun	Karl Morgan; Ryan S. Jhun; AVIN; SLAY; CHASE	2:42
2.	"Bad Liar"	Hyungwon; Justin Oh; Jantine Annika Heij	Hyungwon; Justin Oh; Jantine Annika Heij	Hyungwon; Justin Oh	3:29
3.	"Stardust"	Jang Da-in (PNP)	Gusten Dahlqvist; Christian Fast; Noak Hellsing; Hautboi Rich	Gusten Dahlqvist	3:46
4.	"Where Is This Love"	Hyungwon; Justin Oh; Jantine Annika Heij	Hyungwon; Justin Oh; Jantine Annika Heij	Hyungwon; Justin Oh	3:25
5.	"'Cause of You"	Kihyun; Brother Su	Brother Su	Brother Su	3:40
Total length:					17:02

== Charts ==
=== Album ===
==== Weekly chart ====
Chart performance for Youth
Chart (2022)	Peak position
South Korean Albums (Circle)	3

==== Monthly chart ====
Chart performance for Youth
Chart (2022)	Peak position
South Korean Albums (Circle)	9

==== Year-end chart ====
Chart performance for Youth
Chart (2022)	Position
South Korean Albums (Circle)	90

=== Songs ===
==== Weekly chart ====
Chart performance for "Youth"
Chart (2022)	Peak position
South Korea (Circle)	90

== Certification and sales ==
Certification and sales for Youth
Region	Certification	Certified units/sales
South Korea	—	167,823

== Release history ==
Release history and formats for Youth
Region	Date	Format	Label
South Korea	October 24, 2022	CD; digital download; streaming	Starship Entertainment; Kakao Entertainment
Various	October 24, 2022	Digital download; streaming	Starship Entertainment; Kakao Entertainment
