= Drive (Miyeon song) =

2022 single by Cho Mi-yeon

Single by Miyeon

from the album My
- Released: April 27, 2022
- Genre: Rock; rock-pop
- Length: 3:21
- Label: Cube
- Composers: Lee Min-young (EastWest); Yeul (1by1)
- Lyricist: Yeul (1by1)

Miyeon singles chronology
"Kitty" (2021)	"Drive" (2022)

Music video
- "Drive" on YouTube

"Drive" is a song recorded by South Korean singer Miyeon, released on April 27, 2022, by Cube Entertainment as the lead single of her first extended play, My.

== Composition ==
The title track "Drive", is a rock and rock-pop song that supports those struggling in difficult situations or when facing problems that are hard to handle. Miyeon described it as a song that tells people to keep moving forward and to never lose themselves. The song is composed in the key of A major, 108 beats per minute with a running time of 3:21 minutes.

== Commercial performance ==
Within hours of its release, "Drive" immediately reached No. 1 on Bugs' realtime chart in Korea. The single also brought Miyeon her first music program trophy at SBS MTV's The Show on May 3.

== Promotion ==
Miyeon performed "Drive" on four music programs on the first week: Mnet's M Countdown on April 28, KBS2's Music Bank on April 29, MBC's Show! Music Core on April 30, and SBS's Inkigayo on May 1.

On the second week of the song release, Miyeon performed on SBS MTV's The Show on May 3 where she won first place. She also performed on MBC M's Show Champion on May 4, M Countdown on May 5, Music Bank on May 6, Show! Music Core on May 7, and Inkigayo on May 8.

== Music video ==
An accompanying music video for "Drive" was uploaded to (G)I-dle's official YouTube channel on April 27, 2022. It was preceded by two teasers released on the same platform on April 25 and 26. Miyeon was seen inside a lavish mansion, dressed in luxurious ballgowns as she wanders through its different rooms. She later makes her way through the city, feeling the breeze as she enjoys a night drive.

== Accolades ==
Year-end lists for "Drive"
Critic/Publication	List	Rank	Ref.
Billboard	The 25 Best K-Pop Songs of 2022	15	

Music program awards for "Drive"
Program	Date	Ref.
The Show (SBS MTV)	May 3, 2022	

== Charts ==
=== Weekly charts ===
Chart performance for "Drive"
Chart (2022)	Peak position
South Korea (Gaon)	110

=== Monthly charts ===
Monthly chart performance for "Drive"
Chart (2022)	Position
South Korea (Gaon)	116

== Release history ==
Release history for "Drive"
Region	Date	Format	Distributor
Various	April 27, 2022	Digital download; streaming	Cube; Kakao M; U-Cube
