= Kihyun =

South Korean singer

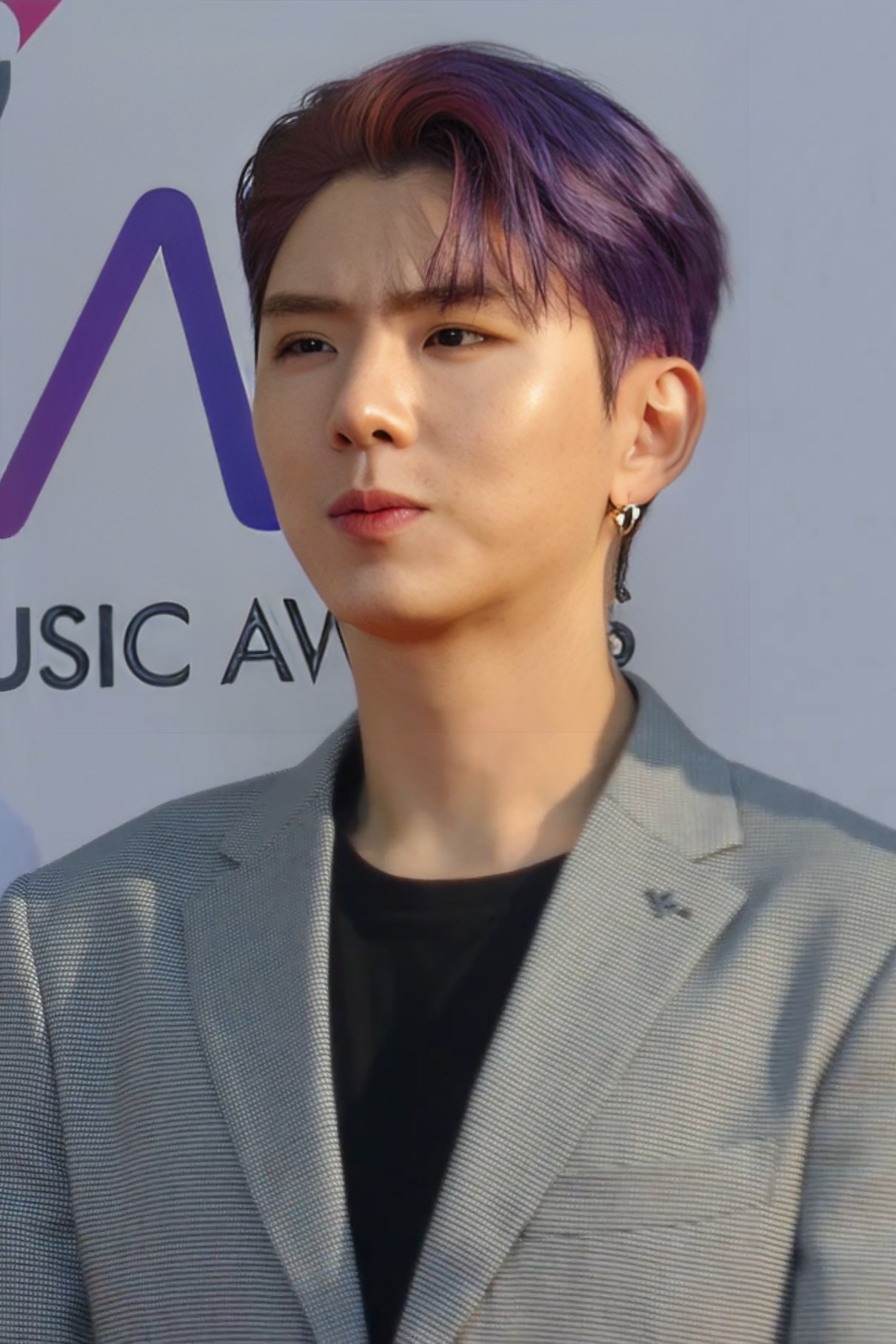
- Kihyun at The Fact Music Awards in April 2019
- Born: Yoo Ki-hyun; November 22, 1993 (age 32); Seoul, South Korea
- Occupations: Singer; songwriter
- Musical career
- Genres: K-pop; Pop rock; R&B
- Instrument: Vocals
- Years active: 2015–present
- Label: Starship
- Member of: Monsta X

Korean name
- Hangul: 유기현
- Hanja: 柳基賢
- RR: Yu Gihyeon
- MR: Yu Kihyŏn

Signature
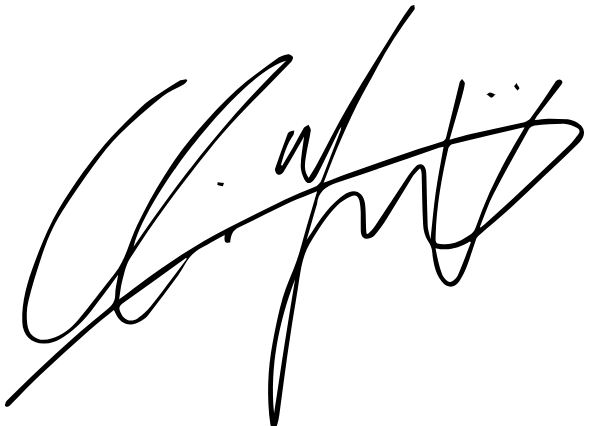

Yoo Ki-hyun (Korean: 유기현, born November 22, 1993), known mononymously as Kihyun, is a South Korean singer and songwriter. He is a member of the South Korean boy group Monsta X under Starship Entertainment. He made his solo debut with the single album Voyager in 2022, in addition to having recorded numerous original soundtracks for South Korean television dramas.

== Early life ==
Kihyun was born in Seoul, South Korea on November 22, 1993. He came from a family of four, which includes his father, mother, an older brother, and himself. Kihyun is also a graduate from Dong-ah Institute of Media and Arts.

== Career ==
=== 2014–2015: Debut and career beginnings ===
In December 2014, Kihyun competed in the Mnet's survival show No.Mercy. Along with six other trainees from the show, Monsta X was formed, a hip-hop idol group that debuted under Starship Entertainment, with the EP Trespass on May 14, 2015. In 2015, through the survival show, he had been featured in two of its soundtracks, for "Pillow" with Sistar's Soyou and Giriboy on January 14, and "0 (Young)" with Giriboy, Mad Clown, Jooyoung, and other remaining trainees in No.Mercy on February 4.

In May 2015, Kihyun and fellow Monsta X member Jooheon, released an original soundtrack "Attractive Woman" for KBS2's Orange Marmalade. In October, he released his first solo original soundtrack "One More Step" for the MBC's television drama She Was Pretty.

=== 2016–2020: Original soundtracks and solo activities ===
Kihyun appeared as a contestant on King of Mask Singer with the name "Tell Them I'm the Dragon King" on January 3, 2016. He won the first round against Apink's Namjoo, known as "Good Daughter Shim Cheong". On the second round of the competition, he lost to Lim Jeong-hee, known as "Rolled Good Fortune", with the difference of three votes.

In April, Kihyun became an MC for MBC Dramanet's Tasteful Beauty Plus. He participated with Son Tae-young and Kim Ji-min, as one of the beauty information and tips experts.

Kihyun sung the acoustic version of "The Tiger Moth" for the soundtrack for MBC's drama Shopping King Louie, which was released on October 27.

In June 2017, an original soundtrack titled "I've Got A Feeling" for SBS' drama Suspicious Partner was released.

In May 2018, Kihyun recorded "Can't Breathe" for MBC's Partners for Justice with fellow Monsta X member Jooheon, and in June, he also recorded "Love Virus" for tvN's drama What's Wrong with Secretary Kim together with WJSN's Seola.

For Monsta X's album All About Luv, Kihyun participated in writing and producing of three songs, including "Who Do U Love?" featuring French Montana (and its remix by will.i.am), "Middle of the Night", and "Beside U". He had previously co-written "I Do Love U" from Take.1 Are You There? with three other members, as well as co-written and produced the song "No Exit" for their debut EP Trespass.

In April 2020, Kihyun released a song for the soundtrack of KBS2's Welcome, titled "Again Spring", and then a song for KBS2's Do Do Sol Sol La La Sol, titled "To Be With You", on October 7. In October, Kihyun had a solo stage for M Studio on M Countdown, where he performed a cover of the song "Bad" by Christopher.

=== 2021–present: Solo debut with Voyager and other solo activities ===
In February, Kihyun released a song for the soundtrack of the drama Replay: The Moment, titled "O.M.O.M.". He was praised for his work in the drama, particularly his voice was able to express the "sweetness and softness" that complemented the drama.

In August, Kihyun appeared as a special guest on Naver Now's Night Studio, where he sang covers of several songs, including "Middle of the Night" by Monsta X and "Radioactive" by Imagine Dragons, with a live band. He also became a new DJ for Naver Now's Midnight Idol, alongside group member I.M.

In September, Kihyun appeared again as a contestant on King of Mask Singer's special duet episode for the 2021 Chuseok holiday. Kihyun also paired up with a co-label solo artist Jeong Se-woon as the "Cheongdam-dong Sworn Brothers". They lost in the first round against MeloMance's Kim Min-seok and actor Kim Woo-seok as the "Brave Brothers".

He made his solo debut with the single album Voyager, along with the lead single of the same name, contributing to the lyrics of the song ", (Comma)" on March 15, 2022. Kihyun tested positive for COVID-19 on March 30.

On August 4, Kihyun released a song for the soundtrack of the webcomic After School Lessons for Unripe Apples, titled "Is This Love".

On September 16, he appeared and performed in the music festival KPOP LAND 2022, to commemorate love, peace, and a better world, in Jakarta, Indonesia.

On October 14, Kihyun performed in the KCON 2022 Japan, held at Ariake Arena in Tokyo. On October 24, he released his first EP Youth, along with the lead single of the same name. On October 25, Kihyun was selected as the sole host for Naver Now's new live show PLAY!, starting on November 7.

On November 12, he released a song for the soundtrack of the new SBS' Friday-Saturday drama The First Responders, titled "Fire".

In January 2023, Kihyun had a pictorial and an interview for the fashion magazine Arena Homme + Korea.

In April, he became a fixed panelist for JTBC's current affairs and liberal arts program Han Moon-cheol's Black Box Review. On April 16, Kihyun and Joohoney participated in the soundtrack of TVING's original Our Game: LG Twins, titled "Awake". It is a song about overcoming difficulties by cheering each other on and raising hope, which combines rock and hip hop, and contains a moving theme of turning adversity upside down. They also participated in its pitch and theta for victory before the game series against Doosan Bears.

On May 7, he released a song for the soundtrack of the television series Tale of the Nine Tailed 1938, titled "Full Moon". On May 28, Kihyun performed at the Peak Festival 2023, held at Nanji Hangang Park in Seoul.

In June, he attended the 2023 Seen Festival in Hội An, Vietnam. On June 22, Kihyun attended the Korea-Vietnam Cultural Exchange Night, held at Vietnam National Convention Center, as "K-pop Representative Singer". It was a place to enjoy K-pop and V-pop together, to strengthen cultural consensus between the two countries and promote friendship for the future generations.

In March 2025, he held a free fan event after his military discharge.

On May 25, Kihyun performed at the Peak Festival 2025, held at Nanji Hangang Park in Seoul.

On June 28, he performed at the Someday Festival, in commemoration of its 10th anniversary, held at KINTEX in Ulsan.

In October, it was announced that Kihyun will be one of the judges for the vocal survival show Veiled Musician.

In April 2026, it was announced that he will perform for third consecutive year at the Peak Festival 2026 on May 24, to be held at Nanji Hangang Park in Seoul. On July 7, Kihyun released his second EP Borderline, along with the lead single "So Good". The lead single's English version was released on July 24. On November 12, he released a song for the soundtrack of the television series Happy Anding, titled "Now".

== Personal life ==
=== Military service ===
Kihyun enlisted for his mandatory military service as part of the military band, with 25th Infantry Division at Yangju army base in North Gyeonggi Province on August 22, 2023. In February 2024, he was featured in the Korean military magazine Kookbang Ilbo. Kihyun was officially discharged on February 21, 2025.

== Artistry ==
=== Musical style and influences ===
Kihyun has been described to possess a soulful pop rock voice that is "refreshing yet sexy". He is also noted for his high-pitched ad libs.

Kihyun had cited singer Harry Styles as his role model.

== Public image and impact ==
Kihyun has been known for his singing ability, recording numerous television dramas soundtracks and vocal cover videos of various genres. As the main vocalist of Monsta X, he has captivated the K-pop fans by showing off his live skills despite the group's strong performances, which also earned him the honorifics "K-pop God" and "Vocal God".

In October 2019, an official statement from Kakao M revealed that Monsta X, which Kihyun is assigned, received 7,906 shares (about ₩1,000,000,000) of it to resolve issue rights to strengthen solidarity with affiliates and entertainers. The group is one of many Kakao M-affiliated artists who received stocks from the company, of which according to reports, is also preparing to rejoin Korea Exchange through a re-IPO.

In July 2022, he was voted as "Emotional Vocal Tone King Idol", with a vote rate of 30.62% out of a total of 297,873 votes after fierce competition among many candidates, including Mamamoo's Wheein, Kim Jae-hwan, and BTS' Jimin. Kihyun was also consistently placed in Tumblr's "Most Popular K-pop Stars", ranking 41st in 2018, 43rd in 2019, 59th in 2020, 76th in 2021, and 75th in 2022. He was also consistently ranked in the "Individual Boy Group Members Brand Power Ranking" published by the Korean Corporate Reputation Research Institute, with the highest ranking at 24th in June 2020.

In September 2022, Architect Professor Yoo Hyun-jun expressed his gratitude to Kihyun for watching Sherlock Hyun-jun videos on YouTube during a delayed flight. Because of this, "Sherlock Hyun-jun" became a real-time trend on Twitter and the number of YouTube subscribers also increased, exceeding 470,000.

He had inspired the group Blitzers for his "cool expression" on stage.

== Other ventures ==
=== Arts and photography ===
In 2016, Kihyun alongside Minhyuk held a special exhibition "Moment in November" at the Space Art 1 in Jung-gu, Seoul from November 26 to 27. Under the theme of "moment", this exhibition consists of Kihyun's photos and Minhyuk's calligraphy and drawings. A space was also prepared for them to see the before and after Monsta X's debut photos, undisclosed polaroids, childhood photos, their cherished items, as well as events for fans, due to the warm response from domestic and foreign fans and to repay the support they showed during the group's activities.

In 2018, Kihyun held a special exhibition "Moment of November 2018 with Kihyun" at The Space Gallery in Gangnam, Seoul for three days from July 6 to 8. This exhibition is held for the first time in two years, which consisted of photos and works taken by him under the theme of "moment", with about 3,000 domestic and foreign visitors coming to the exhibition. It was unfolded with various photos, cherished items, and events including the appearances of the members and their childhood, plus a special space to share precious memories with his fans to commemorate the third anniversary of Monsta X's debut.

In 2023, Kihyun published his first solo photobook The Moment of November, which records the current him in fans' memories, before enlisting on August 22, as well as exhibition and pop-up store at Cafe OAOA in Seongdong-gu, Seoul from August 7 to 15.

=== Endorsements ===
In December 2021, Kihyun collaborated with the newly-established Filipino clothing brand RNDM, with him being its brand ambassador and co-creative director.

In May 2022, Kihyun became the new muse for the Korean unisex street brand AQOstudiospace's 2022 summer collection, which held various promotions, such as SNS participation and exclusive photocards events. In June, he became a model for the Korean cosmetics and skincare brand the SAEM through the Korean star and style magazine AtStyle. On August 22, Kihyun became a model for the Korean lifestyle beauty brand Lalafranc through the Korean fashion, beauty, and life magazine Singles.

In September 2025, he became a model for the Korean casual wear brand CGP. In November, Kihyun and Hyungwon became models for the Korean skincare brand Celimax.

=== Philanthropy ===
In November 2016, proceeds from the 2-days special exhibition "Moment in November" were donated in the names of Kihyun, Minhyuk, and fan club, Monbebe.

In January 2021, he donated ₩10,000,000 to the Good Neighbors, a charity organization that helps low-income families in South Korea, which will be used for support kits containing hygiene products for the girls.

In December 2022, Kihyun donated his cherished items to the Korean general news agency News 1's "Bazaar of Love" and all its proceeds will be donated to Severance Hospital for the treatment and care of children from low-income families and with severe, rare, and incurable diseases.

In June 2025, he introduced the Taegeukgi keyring, a product produced by the Korean company Infresh, which supports the Korean War Veterans.

== Discography ==
=== Extended plays ===
List of extended plays, with selected details, chart positions and sales
Title	Details	Peak chart positions	Sales
Title	Details	KOR	Sales
Youth	Released: October 24, 2022; Label: Starship Entertainment; Formats: CD, digital download, streaming audio	3	KOR: 167,823
Borderline	Released: July 7, 2026; Label: Starship Entertainment; Formats: CD, digital download, streaming audio	6	KOR: 80,165

=== Single albums ===
List of single albums, with selected details, chart positions and sales
Title	Details	Peak chart positions	Sales
Title	Details	KOR	Sales
Voyager	Released: March 15, 2022; Label: Starship Entertainment; Formats: CD, digital download, streaming audio	3	KOR: 207,566

=== Singles ===
==== As lead artist ====
List of singles, showing year released, chart positions, sales and album name
Title	Year	Peak chart positions		Album
Title	Year	KOR	US World	Album
"Voyager"	2022	73	6	Voyager
"Youth"	2022	90	—	Youth
"So Good" (Note: Also released in English version.)	2026	TBA		Borderline
"—" denotes releases that did not chart or were not released in that region.

==== As featured artist ====
List of singles as featured artist, showing year released, chart positions, sales and album name
Title	Year	Peak chart positions	Sales	Album
Title	Year	KOR	Sales	Album
"Pillow" (팔베개) (Soyou and Giriboy featuring Kihyun)	2015	5	KOR: 768,684+	No.Mercy OST Part 2
"0 (Young)" (Jooyoung, Mad Clown, and Giriboy featuring No.Mercy contestants)	2015	71	KOR: 43,760	No.Mercy OST Part 3

==== Collaborative singles ====
List of collaborative singles, showing year released, chart positions, sales and album name
Title	Year	Peak chart positions		Sales	Album
Title	Year	KOR	US World	Sales	Album
"Love Wishes" (누가 그래) (with Junggigo, Mad Clown, Brother Su, Hyunseong, and Yoo Seung-woo)	2016	77	—	KOR: 48,485	Starship Planet 2016
"Moon" (with Astro, Viviz, Minhyuk, I.M, Hoshi, Wonwoo, Mingyu, DK, Seungkwan, Hello Gloom, Rocky, Yoojung, Doyeon, Chani, Bang Chan, and Moon Sua)	2025	— (Note: "Moon" did not enter on the Circle Digital Chart but appeared at number 61 on the component Download Chart.)	4	Undisclosed	Non-album single
"—" denotes releases that did not chart or were not released in that region.

=== Other charted songs ===
List of other charted songs, showing year released, chart positions, sales and album name
Title	Year	Peak chart positions		Album
Title	Year	KOR	US World	Album
", (Comma)"	2022	197	9	Voyager
"Rain"	2022	— (Note: "Rain" did not enter on the Digital Chart but appeared at number 28 on the component Download Chart.)	8	Voyager
"Bad Liar"	2023	— (Note: "Bad Liar" did not enter on the Circle Digital Chart but appeared at number 19 on the component Download Chart.)	—	Youth
"Stardust"	2023	— (Note: "Stardust" did not enter on the Circle Digital Chart but appeared at number 22 on the component Download Chart.)	—	Youth
"Where Is This Love"	2023	— (Note: "Where Is This Love" did not enter on the Circle Digital Chart but appeared at number 20 on the component Download Chart.)	—	Youth
"'Cause of You"	2023	— (Note: "'Cause of You" did not enter on the Circle Digital Chart but appeared at number 25 on the component Download Chart.)	—	Youth
"—" denotes releases that did not chart or were not released in that region.

=== Soundtrack appearances ===
Title	Year	Album	Artist(s)	Ref.
"Attractive Woman"	2015	Orange Marmalade OST Part 2	Kihyun and Jooheon	
"One More Step"	2015	She Was Pretty OST Part 3	Kihyun	
"The Tiger Moth" (Acoustic ver.)	2016	Shopping King Louie OST Part 7	Kihyun	
"I've Got A Feeling"	2017	Suspicious Partner OST Part 7	Kihyun	
"Can't Breathe"	2018	Partners for Justice OST Part 1	Kihyun and Jooheon	
"Love Virus"	2018	What's Wrong with Secretary Kim OST Part 1	Kihyun and Seola	
"Again, Spring"	2020	Welcome OST Part 7	Kihyun	
"To Be With You"	2020	Do Do Sol Sol La La Sol OST Part 1	Kihyun	
"O.M.O.M"	2021	Replay: The Moment OST Part 2	Kihyun	
"Is This Love"	2022	After School Lessons for Unripe Apples OST Part 2	Kihyun	
"Fire"	2022	The First Responders OST Part 1	Kihyun	
"Awake"	2023	Our Game: LG Twins OST	Kihyun and Joohoney	
"Full Moon"	2023	Tale of the Nine Tailed 1938 OST Part 1	Kihyun	
"Surf"	2025	The Winning Try OST Part 1	Kihyun	
"Now"	2026	Happy Anding OST Part 1	Kihyun	

=== Music videos ===
Title	Year	Artist	Director	Ref.
"Voyager"	2022	Kihyun	Lee Jun-woo (Salt Film) / Keep Us Weird	
"Youth"	2022	Kihyun	Lee Rae-kyung (BTS Film)	
"So Good"	2026	Kihyun	Lee Rae-kyung (BTS Film)	

== Filmography ==
=== Television shows ===
Year	Show	Role	Note	Ref.
2014–2015	No.Mercy	Contestant	3rd member announced as part of Monsta X	
2016	King of Mask Singer	Contestant	as "Tell Them I'm the Dragon King" (Episode 40)	
2016	CEO Next Door	Cast	with Yang Se-chan and Kim Dong-hyun	
2016	Tasteful Beauty Plus	MC	with Son Tae-young and Kim Ji-min	
2016	Inkigayo	Special MC	with Minhyuk, Nayeon, and Tzuyu	
2016	M Countdown	Special MC	with Minhyuk and Chaeyeon	
2017	Singing Battle	"Hidden card" Singer	under Park Kyung-lim's team (Episode 23)	
2020	Weekly Idol	Special MC	with Minhyuk for Oneus (Episode 454)	
2020	Hidden Singer	Panelist	with Hyungwon for Season 6 (Episode 5)	
2021	King of Mask Singer	Contestant	with Jeong Se-woon as "Cheongdam-dong Sworn Brothers" (Episode 323)	
2023	Han Moon-cheol's Black Box Review	Panelist	April 6 – August 3 (Episode 25–42)	
2025	Foreign Student Ryu Nam-saeng	Cast	with Ryu Soo-young and Yoon Kyung-ho	
2025	B:My Boyz	Special Judge	with Shownu and Hyungwon (Episode 3)	
2025	Veiled Musician	Judge	with Paul Kim, Ailee, Shin Yong-jae, BOL4, and Belle	

=== Web shows ===
Year	Show	Role	Note	Ref.
2022–2023	PLAY!	MC	Season 1	

=== Radio shows ===
Year	Title	Role	Note	Ref.
2021–2022	Midnight Idol	DJ	with I.M	

=== Music video appearances ===
Year	Title	Artist	Note	Ref.
2015	"You're Beautiful"	Yoo Seung-woo	with Jeongmin	

== Bibliography ==
Year	Title	Category	Ref.
2023	The Moment of November	Photobook	

== Songwriting ==
All credits are adapted from the Korea Music Copyright Association, unless stated otherwise.

Year	Artist(s)	Song	Album	Lyrics		Music		Arrangement	
Year	Artist(s)	Song	Album	Credited	With	Credited	With	Credited	With
2015	Monsta X	"No Exit"	Trespass	Yes	Rhymer; I.M; Jooheon	Yes	Rishi; Rhymer; Jooheon	No	N/A
2018	Monsta X	"I Do Love U"	Take.1 Are You There?	Yes	Wonho; Minhyuk; Jooheon; I.M	No	N/A	No	N/A
2019	Monsta X feat. French Montana	"Who Do U Love?"	All About Luv	Yes	I.M; Wonho; Hyungwon; Shownu; Joohoney; Minhyuk; French Montana; Dan Henig; Jake Torrey; Noah Conrad; Rosanna Ener	Yes	I.M; Wonho; Hyungwon; Shownu; Joohoney; Minhyuk; French Montana; Dan Henig; Jake Torrey; Noah Conrad; Rosanna Ener	No	N/A
2020	Monsta X	"Middle of the Night"	All About Luv	No	N/A	Yes	I.M; Wonho; Hyungwon; Shownu; Joohoney; Minhyuk; Ali Payami; John Mitchell	No	N/A
2022	Kihyun	", (Comma)"	Voyager	Yes	Brother Su	No	N/A	No	N/A
2022	Kihyun	"'Cause of You"	Youth	Yes	Brother Su	No	N/A	No	N/A

== Awards and nominations ==
Name of the award ceremony, year presented, category, recipient of the award and the result of the nomination
Award ceremony	Year	Category	Recipient	Result	Ref.
Brand Customer Loyalty Award (Note: Co-organized by the Korean Customers Council and Brand Keys, this event recognizes the most influential brands in society and culture, as determined through consumer research.)	2022	Most Influential Live Streaming Show DJ	Midnight Idol (with I.M)	Nominated	
Hanteo Music Awards	2022	Artist of the Year (Bonsang)	Kihyun	Nominated	
Korea First Brand Awards (Note: Hosted by the Korea Consumer Brand Committee and the Korea Consumer Forum, the Korea First Brand Awards based its winners on a nationwide South Korean survey.)	2023	Most Anticipated Male Solo Artist	Kihyun	Nominated	

== See also ==
- List of K-pop on the Billboard charts
