= Replay: The Moment =

2021 South Korean web series

- Promotional poster
- Hangul: 리플레이: 다시 시작되는 순간
- RR: Ripeullei: dasi sijakdoeneun sungan
- MR: Rip'ŭllei: tasi sijaktoenŭn sun'gan
- Genre: Youth Drama; Teen drama; Romance
- Developed by: Heart People
- Screenplay by: Kang Min-chae
- Directed by: Go Hee-seop
- Starring: Kim Min-chul; Cho Mi-yeon; Kim Hwi-young; Choi Ji-su; Marco
- Opening theme: "O.M.O.M" by Kihyun (Monsta X)
- Ending theme: "Honey Drop" by Pentagon
- Country of origin: South Korea
- Original language: Korean
- No. of episodes: 10

Production
- Running time: 10 – 17 minutes
- Production company: Heart People

Original release
- Network: KakaoTV; Naver TV; YouTube
- Release: January 19 – February 26, 2021

Replay: The Moment (Korean: 리플레이: 다시 시작되는 순간; lit. 'Replay: The Moment It Starts Again') is a South Korean web series starring Kim Min-chul, Cho Mi-yeon, Kim Hwi-young, Choi Ji-su and Marco. The episodes aired on Replay's YouTube official channel and various OTT platforms (wavve, Seezn, U+mobile TV, etc.) every Tuesday and Friday at 19:00 (KST).

== Synopsis ==
The drama depicts an empathetic romance in a clumsy and anxious, but dreams and love of reliving past emotions in the present eighteen youth. It is unfolded in a way that reproduces the past from the present.

== Cast ==
=== Main ===
- Kim Min-chul as Gong Chan-young, Neon Paprika's keyboardist.
- Cho Mi-yeon as Yoo Ha-young, Neon Paprika's vocalist.
- Kim Hwi-young as Lee Ji-hoon, Neon Paprika's guitarist.
- Choi Ji-su as Im Seo-eun, Neon Paprika's leader and bassist.
- Marco as Shim Tae-young, Neon Paprika's drummer.

=== Special appearance ===
- Kwon Hyuk-soo as Lee In-ho
- Lee Do-yeon as the homeroom teacher (episode 1)
- Jeong Hyeon-hwan as the workshop owner (episodes 5 and 6)
- Lee Gyu-ho as Im Seo-eun's uncle (episode 4)
- Jiwon (episode 10)

== Production ==
=== Development ===
The drama is produced by Heart People who had produced web drama, Our Baseball.

=== Casting ===
On September 24, 2020, Heart People announced that they had confirmed the main casting of the web drama 'Replay' and has started shooting. It was reported that Cho Mi-yeon and Kim Hwi-young has been cast in the series. The following day, Cho Mi-yeon and Choi Ji-su confirmed joining the cast. The first script reading was held in September 2020.

=== Promotion ===
On October 19, 2020, the stills from filming of the series were released. A teaser poster with the phrase 'Neon Paprika' and tagline "The moment when everything starts again" was released on December 4, 2020. From December 18–25, 2020, introductions of the characters were released.

On January 4, 2021, a band version poster was released through the drama's social media accounts. In the released poster, the five protagonists pose with their own musical instruments. The production company Heart People stated, "The actors learned the instruments themselves and played them throughout the filming period for real acting."

== Release ==
A pre-release video of 'Replay Space Tour was released on January 8, 2021. On January 10, the main trailer for the web drama was released and announcing the series premiere date on January 19. Heart People held a live online fan showcase through Like That's official YouTube channel at 5 pm KST the same day of its released.

On July 22, 2021, South Korean media company NEW K.ID announced that Replay will aired on The Roku Channel, LG Channels, Samsung TV Plus, Xumo, Vizio, Plex, Whale Live, and THETA.tv in North America, South America, and Europe.

=== Broadcast ===
Country	Network
South Korea	Seezn, Wavve, TVing, SERIESon, KakaoPage, Olleh TV, B TV SkyLife, Cinefox, GomTv, Yes24.com, Home Choice, Naver TV, KakaoTV
Japan; Hong Kong; Macau; Taiwan	Hello LIVE
Worldwide (Note: Restricted access on some countries due to broadcasting rights.)	YouTube, Rakuten Viki, Hello LIVE

== Original soundtrack ==
Replay OST

Soundtrack album by Various artists
- Released: 2021
- Genre: Soundtrack
- Languages: Korean; English
- Label: Music&New

=== Part 1 ===
Released on January 28, 2021
No.	Title	Lyrics	Music	Artist	Length
1.	"Honey Drop"	Moon Kim; Wooseok (Pentagon)	Park Seul-gi (153/Joombas); Moon Kim (153/Joombas); Park Jae-hyung	Pentagon	3:28
2.	"Honey Drop" (Inst.)		Park Seul-gi (153/Joombas); Moon Kim(153/Joombas); Park Jae-hyung		3:28
Total length:					6:56

=== Part 2 ===
Released on February 4, 2021
No.	Title	Lyrics	Music	Artist	Length
1.	"O.M.O.M"	Park Seul-gi; Lee Jin-kyung; Keum Sung-sik	Park Seul-gi; Lee Jin-kyung	Kihyun (Monsta X)	3:42
2.	"O.M.O.M" (Inst.)		Park Seul-gi; Lee Jin-kyung		3:42
Total length:					7:24

=== Part 3 ===
Released on February 9, 2021
No.	Title	Lyrics	Music	Artist	Length
1.	"Hidden Star" (가려진 별)	Lee Joo-hyung (MonoTree)	Lee Joo-hyung (MonoTree); Chu Dae-kwan (MonoTree); YONGZOO	2F (Shin Yong-jae, Kim Won-joo)	4:15
2.	"Hidden Star" (Inst.)		Lee Joo-hyung (MonoTree); Chu Dae-kwan (MonoTree); YONGZOO		4:15
Total length:					8:30

=== Part 4 ===
Released on February 12, 2021
No.	Title	Lyrics	Music	Artist	Length
1.	"I Want"	Kim Hyun-ah, Park Tae-jin, Gwang Ok Ban, Jeon Yong-jun	Kim Hyun-ah, Park Tae-jin, Gwang Ok Ban, Jeon Yong-jun	Niel (Teen Top)	3:06
2.	"I Want" (Inst.)		Kim Hyun-ah, Park Tae-jin, Gwang Ok Ban, Jeon Yong-jun		3:06
Total length:					6:12

=== Part 5 ===
Released on February 16, 2021
No.	Title	Lyrics	Music	Artist	Length
1.	"Why'd You Leave Me" (왜, 너만)	Lee Joo-hyung (MonoTree); Kim Jae-hwan	Lee Joo-hyung (MonoTree); Kim Jae-hwan)	Seo Eun-kwang (BtoB)	4:15
2.	"Why'd You Leave Me" (Inst.)		Lee Joo-hyung (MonoTree); Kim Jae-hwan		4:15
Total length:					8:30

=== Part 6 ===
Released on February 19, 2021
No.	Title	Lyrics	Music	Artist	Length
1.	"Dreaming About You"	Aiming (Blue Mangtto)	Aiming (Kim Chang-rak, Kim Subin, Cho Sehee, Blue Mangtto)	Miyeon ((G)I-dle)	3:41
2.	"Dreaming About You" (Inst.)		Aiming (Kim Chang-rak, Kim Subin, Cho Sehee, Blue Mangtto)		3:41
Total length:					7:22

=== Part 7 ===
Released on February 23, 2021
No.	Title	Lyrics	Music	Artist	Length
1.	"Think About You"	Kim Hyun-ah, Park Tae-jin, Gwang Ok Ban	Kim Hyun-ah, Park Tae-jin, Gwang Ok Ban	PL	2:59
2.	"Think About You" (Inst.)		Kim Hyun-ah, Park Tae-jin, Gwang Ok Ban		2:59
Total length:					5:58

=== Special track ===
Released on February 26, 2021
No.	Title	Lyrics	Music	Artist	Length
1.	"How To Love" (with Neon Paprika)	Kim Yong	Kim Yong	Miyeon ((G)I-dle)	3:30
2.	"How To Love"		Kim Yong		3:30
Total length:					7:00

=== Replay: Original Television Soundtrack ===
The following is the official track list of Replay: Original Television Soundtrack album. The tracks with no indicated lyricists and composers are the drama's musical score; the artists indicated for these tracks are the tracks' composers themselves. Singles included on the album were released from January 28 to February 26, 2021.

Replay: Original Television Soundtrack

No.	Title	Lyrics	Music	Artist	Length
1.	"Honey Drop"	Moon Kim; Wooseok (Pentagon)	Park Seul-gi (153/Joombas); Moon Kim (153/Joombas); Park Jae-hyung	Pentagon	3:28
2.	"O.M.O.M"	Park Seul-gi; Lee Jin-kyung; Keum Sung-sik	Park Seul-gi; Lee Jin-kyung	Kihyun (Monsta X)	3:42
3.	"Hidden Star"	Lee Joo-hyung (MonoTree)	Lee Joo-hyung (MonoTree); Chu Dae-kwan (MonoTree); YONGZOO	2F (Shin Yong-jae, Kim Won-joo)	4:15
4.	"I Want"	Kim Hyun-ah, Park Tae-jin, Gwang Ok Ban, Jeon Yong-jun	Kim Hyun-ah, Park Tae-jin, Gwang Ok Ban, Jeon Yong-jun	Niel (Teen Top)	3:06
5.	"Why'd You Leave Me"	Lee Joo-hyung (MonoTree); Kim Jae-hwan	Lee Joo-hyung (MonoTree); Kim Jae-hwan)	Seo Eun-kwang (BtoB)	4:15
6.	"Dreaming About You"	Aiming (Blue Mangtto)	Aiming (Kim Chang-rak, Kim Subin, Cho Sehee, Blue Mangtto)	Miyeon ((G)I-dle)	3:41
7.	"Think About You"	Kim Hyun-ah, Park Tae-jin, Gwang Ok Ban	Kim Hyun-ah, Park Tae-jin, Gwang Ok Ban	PL	2:59
8.	"How To Love" (with Neon Paprika)	Kim Yong	Kim Yong	Miyeon ((G)I-dle)	3:30
9.	"Honey Drop" (Inst.)		Park Seul-gi (153/Joombas); Moon Kim (153/Joombas); Park Jae-hyung		3:28
10.	"O.M.O.M" (Inst.)		Park Seul-gi; Lee Jin-kyung		3:42
11.	"Hidden Star" (Inst.)		Lee Joo-hyung (MonoTree); Chu Dae-kwan (MonoTree); YONGZOO		4:15
12.	"I Want" (Inst.)		Kim Hyun-ah, Park Tae-jin, Gwang Ok Ban, Jeon Yong-jun		3:06
13.	"Why'd You leave Me" (Inst.)		Lee Joo-hyung (MonoTree); Kim Jae-hwan)		4:15
14.	"Dreaming About You" (Inst.)		Aiming (Kim Chang-rak, Kim Subin, Cho Sehee, Blue Mangtto)		3:41
15.	"Think About You" (Inst.)		Kim Hyun-ah, Park Tae-jin, Gwang Ok Ban		2:59
16.	"How to Love"			Miyeon ((G)I-dle)	3:30
17.	"Key ring"			Kim Yong	1:44
18.	"A sneaky guest"			Kim Yong	1:25
19.	"School office"			Kim Yong	1:04
20.	"Together"			Kim Yong	1:40
21.	"Are you a pervert?"			Kim Yong	1:59
22.	"Neon"			Kim Yong	0:59
23.	"Peaceful day"			Kim Yong	1:14
24.	"Pass"			Kim Yong	1:10
25.	"I want to be special"			Kim Yong	1:46
26.	"Paprika"			Kim Yong	1:35
27.	"Cruel dream"			Kim Yong	1:19
28.	"Discovery"			Kim Yong	1:57
29.	"I like you"			Kim Yong	3:27
Total length:					60:19

== Episodes ==
No.	Title	Original release date
1	"Your Name Is"; Transliteration: "Neoui Ireumeun" (Korean: 너의 이름은)	January 19, 2020
2	"A Little Closer"; Transliteration: "Jogeumman Deo Gakkai" (Korean: 조금만 더 가까이)	January 29, 2021
3	"Just Curious"; Transliteration: "Gunggeumhae" (Korean: 궁금해)	February 2, 2021
4	"Catching My Attention"; Transliteration: "Singyeongsseuyeo" (Korean: 신경쓰여)	February 5, 2021
5	"Because I Like You"; Transliteration: "Joahanikka" (Korean: 좋아하니까)	February 9, 2021
6	"Special"; Transliteration: "Teukbyeolhae" (Korean: 특별해)	February 12, 2021
7	"Misunderstanding"; Transliteration: "Ohae" (Korean: 오해)	February 16, 2021
8	"Unexpected"; Transliteration: "Yesangchi motan" (Korean: 예상치 못한)	February 19, 2021
9	"Lies"; Transliteration: "Geojinmal" (Korean: 거짓말)	February 23, 2021
10	"Friend to Couple"; Transliteration: "Chingueseo yeonin" (Korean: 친구에서 연인)	February 26, 2021

== Reception ==
=== Viewership ===
The web series accumulated two million views in 10 days after the released and entered the top ranking popular Korean YouTube videos and popular web dramas on various portal sites. At the end of February, the series recorded more than 6 million cumulative views and 380,000 hours of viewing time, also the buzzword "Hey! Gong Chan-young" was a hot topic from real-time comments from global fans.

== Awards and nominations ==
Award	Year	Category	Recipient(s)	Result	Ref.
Seoul International Drama Awards	2021	Outstanding Korean Drama OST	Seo Eun-kwang ("Why'd You Leave Me")	Nominated	
Seoul International Drama Awards	2021	Outstanding Korean Drama OST	Cho Mi-yeon ("Dreaming About You")	Nominated	
