= My (EP) =

- Digital cover

EP by Miyeon
- Released: April 27, 2022
- Recorded: 2022
- Genres: K-pop; R&B
- Length: 21:45
- Language: Korean
- Labels: Cube; Kakao

Singles from My
- 1. "Drive" Released: April 27, 2022

My is the debut extended play by South Korean singer Miyeon. It was released digitally on April 27, 2022, and physically on April 28, 2022, through Cube Entertainment. My consists of six tracks, including the lead single "Drive".

== Background ==
On April 6, 2022, Cube Entertainment announced that Miyeon would make her solo debut at the end of April. On April 8, 2022, the artwork teaser for My was released through the official SNS channels of (G)I-dle. The scheduler and mood film were released on April 11 and 13 respectively. The track list was then revealed on April 15. From April 18 to 22, Miyeon released five sets of concept photos.

On April 25, 2022, Cube Entertainment released the music video teaser for "Drive". The following day, Cube Entertainment released the second music video teaser for the single. The album was released on April 27, 2022.

== Composition ==
The EP's title My has a dual meaning, with it also referring to Miyeon's initials.

The first song on the album, "Rose", refers directly to Miyeon's name as the syllable "Mi" refers to roses. The lead single "Drive" is a rock song about people struggling in difficult situations or facing problems that are hard to handle. Miyeon described it as a song that tells people to keep moving forward. The third track, "Softly" is a R&B song; "Te Amo" follows, which focuses on falling in love. "Charging" is a ballad that features singer Junny. Miyeon stated that the last song, "Rain" (소나기), reminds her of her childhood when she spent hours watching drama shows. She also wrote the lyrics of the track, and bandmate Yuqi participated in its composition.

== Promotion ==
Following the release of the extended play, Miyeon performed "Drive" on four music programs on the first week: Mnet's M Countdown on April 28, KBS2's Music Bank on April 29, MBC's Show! Music Core on April 30, and SBS's Inkigayo on May 1.

Additionally, Miyeon performed "Te Amo" on two music programs on the first week: Mnet's M Countdown on April 28 and KBS2's Music Bank on April 29. In the second week of promotions, Miyeon performed "Te Amo" on SBS MTV's The Show on May 3 and MBC M's Show Champion on May 4.

== Accolades ==
Awards and nominations
Organization	Year	Category	Result	Ref.
Asian Pop Music Awards	2022	Best Female Artist (Overseas)	Nominated	

== Track listing ==
My track listing
No.	Title	Lyrics	Music	Arrangement	Length
1.	"Rose"	Honey Pot; BenAddict; Clef Crew	BenAddict (Clef); Choi Min-joon; Lee Jeong-woo; Clef Crew	Choi Min-joon; Lee Jeong-woo; BenAddict	3:20
2.	"Drive"	Yeul (1by1)	Lee Min-young (EastWest); Yeul (1by1)	Lee Min-young (EastWest); Yeul (1by1)	3:21
3.	"Softly"	Brother Su	Dress; Belle	Dress	3:56
4.	"Te Amo"	Lee Seu-ran	Julia Michaels; Ferras; David Embree (Optimist); Jarrad Kritzstein; Raiden	Optimist; Jarrad K.; Raiden	4:16
5.	"Charging" (featuring Junny)	Jina	Dress; Belle; Jonghan	Dress	3:42
6.	"Rain" (소나기)	Miyeon	Yuqi; Siixk Jun	Siixk Jun	3:07
Total length:					21:45

== Charts ==
=== Weekly charts ===
Chart performance for My
Chart (2022)	Peak position
South Korean Albums (Gaon)	4

=== Monthly charts ===
Monthly chart performance for My
Chart (2022)	Peak position
South Korean Albums (Gaon)	14

== Certifications and sales ==
Region	Certification	Certified units/sales
South Korea	—	109,994

== Release history ==
Release dates and formats for My
Region	Date	Format	Label
Various	April 27, 2022	Download; streaming	Cube; Kakao Entertainment; U-Cube
Various	April 28, 2022	CD	Cube; Kakao Entertainment; U-Cube
