= Kim Min-chul (actor) =

South Korean actor (born 2000)

- Born: South Korea
- Occupation: Actor
- Years active: 2018–present
- Agent: Zion

Korean name
- Hangul: 김민철
- RR: Gim Mincheol
- MR: Kim Minch'ŏl

Kim Min-chul (Korean: 김민철; born in 2000) is a South Korean actor under Zion Entertainment. He made his debut acting in the 2018 film Brothers in Heaven.

== Filmography ==
=== Film ===
Year	Title	Role	Ref.
2018	Brothers in Heaven	Unknown	
2021	Nobody's Lover	Kang Woo	
2022	Project Wolf Hunting	Unknown	

=== Television series ===
Year	Title	Role	Ref.
2020	Single & Ready to Mingle	Kang Jun-woo	
2022	Record of Youth	Chi Young	
2022	KBS Drama Special: "Prism"	Choi Nak-hyeon	
2023	Crash Course in Romance	Choi Chi-yeol	
2023–2024	Welcome to Samdal-ri	Gong Ji-chan	
2025	Crushology 101	Lee Dong-ha	
2025	KBS Drama Special – Love : Track: My Father’s Funeral	Kang In-ho	
2026	Spooky in Love	Kang Ji-hwan	

=== Web series ===
Year	Title	Role	Ref.
2019	The Guilty Secret	Lee Yoo-jae	
2019	Dating Class	Im Ha-jun	
2021	Replay: The Moment	Go Chan-young	
2023	Duty After School	Do Soo-cheol	
2024	Hierarchy	Kang In-han	
