= Shape of Love =

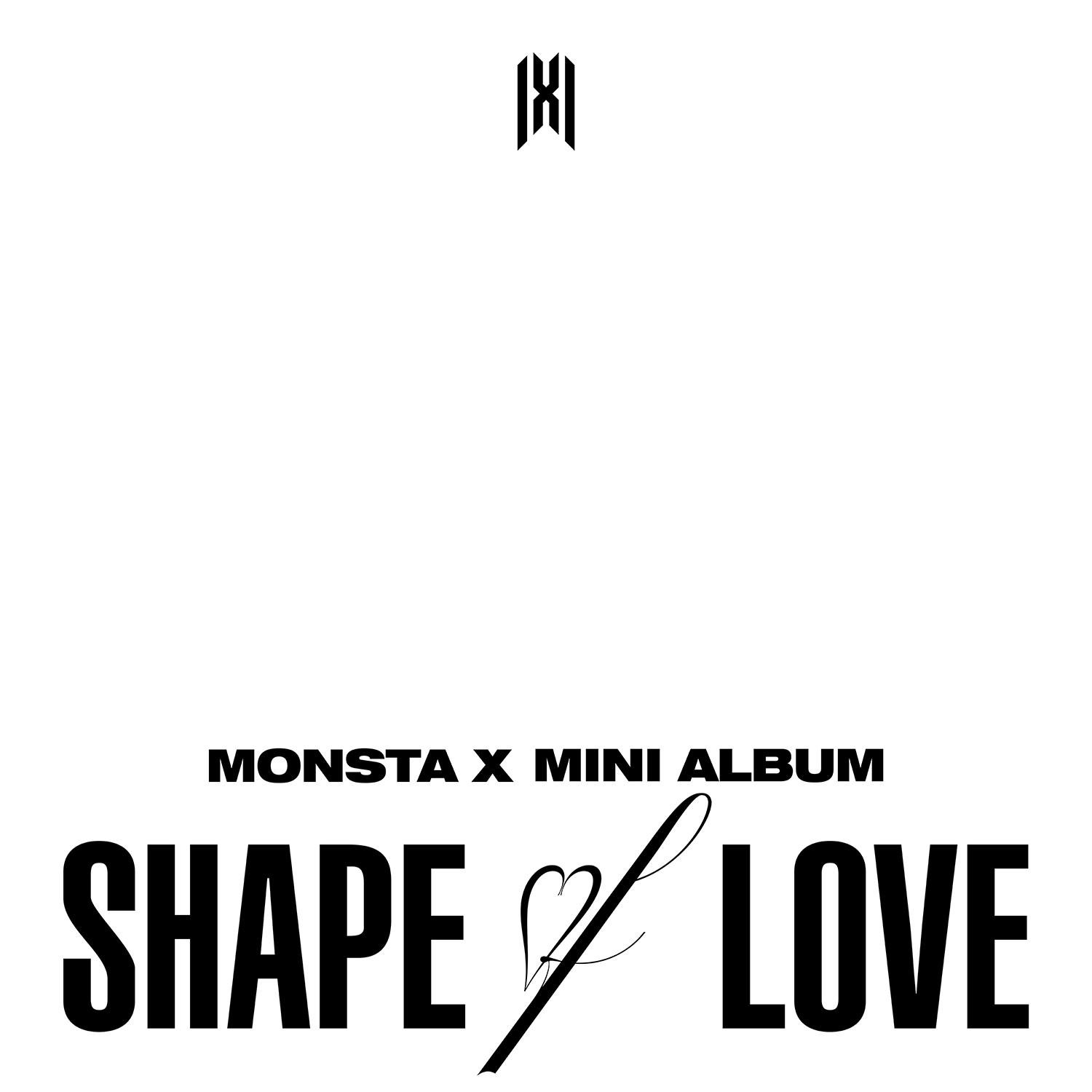

EP by Monsta X
- Released: April 26, 2022
- Genre: K-pop
- Length: 19:20
- Language: Korean
- Label: Starship; Kakao

Monsta X chronology
The Dreaming (2021)	Shape of Love (2022)	Reason (2023)

Singles from Shape of Love
- 1. "Love" Released: April 26, 2022

Shape of Love (stylized as SHAPE of LOVE) is the eleventh extended play by the South Korean boy group Monsta X. It was released by Starship Entertainment and distributed by Kakao Entertainment on April 26, 2022.

== Background and release ==
On March 24, Monsta X posted the coming soon image of the eleventh EP Shape of Love on the group's official SNS. In the released black image, only the easel with a colorful heart drawing is illuminated in the dark. The release date was also announced to be on April 11. However, starting from March 28, the group members tested positive for COVID-19, then as a result, their comeback was postponed until April 26.

Joohoney participated in writing, composing, and arranging the songs "Love" and "사랑한다" (Saranghanda), while Hyungwon and I.M, for songs "Burning Up" (featuring R3hab) and "And", respectively. The three members also worked together for the song "Wildfire".

The physical EP was released in four standard versions; Love, Originality, Vibe, and Everything, with the addition of jewel cases version, KiT version, and a special version designed by Minhyuk and photos taken by Kihyun.

== Composition ==
Shape of Love is an EP with the theme of love and attempts to capture the various forms of love that exist in the world.

"Love" combines a catchy R&B guitar sound with an old school feel and a crude, but groovy hip-hop bass. "Burning Up" is all about love and passion, which also compares the beginning and excitement of love to a fire, while "Wildfire" is a contrast to "Burning Up", expressing the pain of corrupted love. "Breathe" is a song that expresses the feeling of falling in love, while "사랑한다" (Saranghanda) is a song dedicated to their fan club, collectively referred to as "Monbebe". "And" is a song where the emotional consumption was enormous, since it was made in a slightly difficult condition.

== Promotion ==
On April 15, Monsta X officially began their comeback promotion by releasing the schedule poster for Shape of Love through their official SNS. Starting April 17, the group presented four versions of concept photos: Love, Originality, Vibe, and Everything, released the music video teaser on April 24, the album preview on April 25, and released the EP on April 26. Monsta X also held a comeback showcase on Universe to introduce Shape of Love alongside its lead single on April 26. Ahead of their comeback, they already appeared on the KBS2's The King of Jujeop alongside their fan club. Monsta X members and hosts of MBC Radio's Idol Radio 2 Hyungwon and Joohoney represented the group on the show. On the second week of the comeback, they subsequently appeared on several music programs including Mnet's M Countdown on May 5, KBS2's Music Bank on May 6, MBC's Show! Music Core on May 7, and SBS' Inkigayo on May 8.

== Critical reception ==
Professional ratings
Review scores
Source	Rating
Clash	7/10
NME	4/5 stars

Robin Murray, writing for Clash, said that the dynamic of "the group vs the individual, outside forces vs their own unique voice – is what drives Shape of Love, a project fuelled by a quiet sense of evolution". About the tracks, Murray feel that "Love" is buoyed by "red-hot 90s hip-hop vibes, filtering boom-bap elements through an R&B lens", "Burning Up" found "Monsta X lining up alongside R3hab, and it takes the project in a slightly more subtle, soulful, and explicitly emotional direction", "Wildfire" is "all layered vocals and potent lyricism, with I.M having contributed extensively", "Breathe" is "a snappy, quickfire offering", and closing track "And" is "led by stadium-level guitar lines, reminiscent of Coldplay but within a definitively K-pop context".

Reviewing the EP for NME, Rhian Daly described it as "a record which talks about the different types of love in the world and molds the concept in the band's own way". It does not only tries to "diversify its perspectives in its storytelling, but also offers up an eclectic mix of sounds along the way". About the tracks, Daly described the title track "Love" as a song with "unconditional energy" and "addictive verse". The old-school groove of "Breathe" portrays the "physical feelings of falling head over heels, from turning red-faced to your lungs struggling to keep up with your heart". "Wildfire" explores the moment where "love roars into pain, the excitement of before engulfed in scorching agony". The fan tribute "사랑한다" (Saranghanda), meanwhile, is "emotional but offers up lightly bubbling pop with flashes of sparkling synths deployed to evoke subtle euphoria". The ending song "And" is described as a "shadowy pop-rock, melancholy guitar melodies casting a grey light over the track". Daly also commended the group's "voracious appetite" of pushing their sound forward and manages to "stitch each sound together seamlessly and smoothly".

=== Listicles ===
Name of critic or publication, name of listicle, name of work and rank
Critic/Publication	List	Work	Rank	Ref.
Song
Dazed	The Best K-pop Tracks of 2022	"Love"	30	
Teen Vogue	The 79 Best K-pop Songs of 2022	"Love"	Placed (Note: All the albums and songs listed are either unranked or just alphabetically ranked.)	
Teen Vogue	21 Best K-pop Music Videos of 2022	"Love"	Placed	

== Commercial performance ==
The EP debuted at number three on the monthly Gaon Album Chart and sold more than 415,000 copies in its first month of release in South Korea. Monsta X also received their second Hanteo Chart Silver Certification Plaque for achieving more than 320,000 copies in Initial Chodong sales in its first week of release in South Korea.

"Love" debuted at number 60 on the weekly Gaon Digital Chart, while at number 185 on the monthly Gaon Digital Chart, making it the group's second entry on the monthly chart for digitals. All the other songs on the EP, "Burning Up", "Breathe", "Wildfire", "Saranghanda", and "And" did not appear on the main chart, but did appear on its component chart, the Gaon Download Chart, peaking at 32, 42, 38, 39, and 41, respectively. It won two music show awards on Show Champion and Music Bank, with a Hot Stage Award on Inkigayo. (Note: This award selects the first place with the most wonderful performance on stage for the artists who appeared on the day's broadcast with 100% of fan votes.)

== Track listing ==
Shape of Love track listing
No.	Title	Lyrics	Music	Arrangement	Length
1.	"Love"	Joohoney; Ye-Yo!; I.M; Laser; Roydo; Brother Su	Joohoney; Ye-Yo!; Laser; Roydo	Joohoney; Ye-Yo!	3:35
2.	"Burning Up" (featuring R3hab)	Hyungwon; Jantine Annika Heij; Justin Oh	Hyungwon; Jantine Annika Heij; Justin Oh; R3hab	Hyungwon; R3hab; Justin Oh	3:20
3.	"Breathe"	Liljune; Ryan S. Jhun; LordQuest; Kso Jaynes; P. Wright	Ryan S. Jhun; LordQuest; Kso Jaynes; P. Wright	Ryan S. Jhun; LordQuest	2:22
4.	"Wildfire"	Hyungwon; Jantine Annika Heij; Justin Oh; Joohoney; I.M	Hyungwon; Jantine Annika Heij; Justin Oh; Joohoney; I.M	Hyungwon; Justin Oh	3:38
5.	"Saranghanda" (사랑한다)	Joohoney; Ye-Yo!; I.M; Laser	Joohoney; Ye-Yo!; Bae Ki-hyun; Laser	Joohoney; Ye-Yo!; Bae Ki-hyun	3:26
6.	"And"	I.M; Yoonseok; Wooki	I.M; Yoonseok; Wooki	I.M; Yoonseok; Wooki	2:56
Total length:					19:20

Notes

- "Love" and "And" are stylized in all caps.

== Charts ==
=== Album ===
==== Weekly charts ====
Chart performance for Shape of Love
Chart (2022)	Peak position
Japanese Albums (Oricon)	8
South Korean Albums (Gaon)	1

==== Monthly chart ====
Chart performance for Shape of Love
Chart (2022)	Peak position
South Korean Albums (Gaon)	3

==== Year-end chart ====
Chart performance for Shape of Love
Chart (2022)	Position
South Korean Albums (Circle)	41

=== Song ===
==== Weekly charts ====
Chart performance for "Love"
Chart (2022)	Peak position
South Korea (Gaon)	60
US World Digital Song Sales (Billboard)	10

==== Monthly chart ====
Chart performance for "Love"
Chart (2022)	Peak position
South Korea (Gaon)	185

== Certification and sales ==
Certification and sales for Shape of Love
Region	Certification	Certified units/Sales
South Korea (KMCA)	Platinum	454,440
Japan	—	1,915

== Accolades ==
Hot Stage Award for "Love"
Program	Date	Ref.
Inkigayo	May 15, 2022	

Music program award for "Love"
Program	Date (2 total)	Ref.
Music Bank	May 6, 2022	
Show Champion	May 4, 2022	

== Release history ==
Release history and formats for Shape of Love
Region	Date	Format	Label
South Korea	April 26, 2022	CD; digital download; streaming	Starship Entertainment; Kakao Entertainment
Various	April 26, 2022	Digital download; streaming	Starship Entertainment; Kakao Entertainment

== See also ==
- Now Project
- List of certified albums in South Korea
- List of Gaon Album Chart number ones of 2022
- List of K-pop songs on the Billboard charts
- List of K-pop songs on the World Digital Song Sales chart
