= The X (EP) =

EP by Monsta X
- Released: September 1, 2025
- Genres: K-pop; hip-hop; R&B
- Length: 21:25
- Language: Korean
- Labels: Starship; Kakao
- Producers: 37; Michael Carmine Dato; Dem Jointz; Jantine Annika Heij; Hyungwon; I.M; Joohoney; Ido Nadjar; Justin Oh; Elie Jay Rizk; Tancrede Rouff; Imad Royal; Wooki; Ye-Yo!; Yoonseok

Monsta X chronology
Now Project (2025)	The X (2025)	Unfold (2026)

Singles from The X
- 1. "Do What I Want" Released: August 18, 2025; 2. "N the Front" Released: September 1, 2025

The X is the thirteenth extended play by the South Korean boy group Monsta X. It was released by Starship Entertainment and distributed by Kakao Entertainment on September 1, 2025.

== Background and release ==
The X is Monsta X's first EP since the release of Reason in 2023, as five of the members had served their mandatory military service between 2021 and 2025.

The "X" in the album title is a reference both to the group's name and the Roman numeral for the number ten, referring to the group's ten-year history. The EP also has six tracks to represent the group's six members.

On August 18, Monsta X released "Do What I Want" with a music video, as a pre-release single. The EP was released, with "N the Front" as the lead single alongside its music video, on September 1.

On September 5, Monsta X released a digital deluxe version of the EP, that included a remix version of the lead single by Hyungwon under his DJ name called "N the Front (H.ONE Remix)".

== Composition ==
Joohoney, I.M, and Hyungwon participated in the writing and production of the EP. In addition to writing for his rap in "Savior" and "Catch Me Now", Joohoney co-wrote and produced the hip-hop tracks "Do What I Want" and "Tuscan Leather". I.M wrote for his rap part in "Do What I Want" and "Catch Me Now", while he co-wrote and produced the track "Savior". Hyungwon co-wrote and produced "Fire & Ice", a track with an old school R&B vibe that would've fit into the New Jack Swing scene of the late 1980s and early 1990s.

== Critical reception ==
Professional ratings
Review scores
Source	Rating
Clash	8/10

Maria Mata from Melodic described it as "a nonstop celebration with an eclectic blend of styles." Mata also highlighted the track "Tuscan Leather" as one of the EP's most complex tracks for it is "lyrically enticing, its shape-shifting sound is what makes it so interesting, with an old school hip-hop vibe that seamlessly turns into melodic pop."

Chyenne Tatum from Clash said that it is "a celebratory fusion of old and new, combining some of Monsta X's most emblematic traits with fresh and uncharted territory that fits right into their wheelhouse" and praised the lyrics, saying "There's no doubt the lyrics throughout this album have not missed." Tatum also called "Tuscan Leather" one of the EP's highlights and described "Fire & Ice" as "an exhilarating blend of house, R&B, and a dash of synth-pop that easily makes this one of the most dynamic entries of The X."

== Commercial performance ==
The EP debuted at number 5 on the weekly Circle Album Chart upon release. The lead single "N the Front" entered the weekly Circle Digital Chart at number 65. The other tracks on the album did not appear on the Digital Chart, but they all entered its component chart, the Circle Download Chart. "Do What I Want", the pre-release single, peaked at number 12 of that chart, and "Tuscan Leather", "Savior", "Fire & Ice", and "Catch Me Now" debuted at 52, 53, 54, and 55, respectively. It sold 383,537 units in South Korea for its first week of release.

== Track listing ==
The X track listing
No.	Title	Lyrics	Music	Producer(s)	Length
1.	"Do What I Want"	Joohoney; I.M	Joohoney; Bekuh Boom; Blaise Railey; Elie Jay Rizk; Imad Royal	Rizk; Royal	2:40
2.	"N the Front"	Jang Da-in; Artiffect	Dem Jointz; Ido Nadjar; Kristine Bogan; Musikality	Dem Jointz; Nadjar	3:00
3.	"Savior"	I.M; Yoonseok; Wooki; Joohoney	I.M; Yoonseok; Wooki	I.M; Yoonseok; Wooki	3:10
4.	"Tuscan Leather"	Joohoney; Ye-Yo!; I.M; BK	Joohoney; Ye-Yo!; Laser	Joohoney; Ye-Yo!	3:02
5.	"Catch Me Now"	Moon Seol-li; I.M; Joohoney	Okhan Uenver; 37	37	3:05
6.	"Fire & Ice"	Hyungwon; Justin Oh; Jantine Annika Heij; Michele Carmine Dato; Tancrede Rouff	Hyungwon; Oh; Heij; Dato; Rouff	Hyungwon; Oh; Heij; Dato; Rouff	2:42
Total length:					17:39

Deluxe version bonus track
No.	Title	Lyrics	Music	Producer(s)	Length
7.	"N the Front" (H.ONE Remix)	Jang Da-in; Artiffect	Dem Jointz; Nadjar; Bogan; Musikality	DJ H.ONE; Oh	3:46
Total length:					21:25

== Personnel ==
Credits adapted from Tidal.

=== Monsta X ===
- Shownu – lead vocals
- Minhyuk – lead vocals
- Kihyun – lead vocals
- Hyungwon – lead vocals
- Joohoney – rap vocals (all tracks), background vocals (tracks 1, 4)
- I.M – rap vocals

=== Additional musicians ===
- Sam Carter – background vocals (1, 2, 5, 6)
- Elie Jay Rizk – drums (1)
- Imad Royal – drums (1)
- Dem Jointz – drums (2)
- Ido Poleg – drums (2)
- Wooki – drums (3)
- Yoonseok – background vocals (3)
- Ohk Jae-won – background vocals, bass guitar (4)
- Lee Jin-ho – drums (4)
- 37 – drums (5)
- DJ H.ONE – remixing (7)

=== Technical ===
- Jennifer Ortiz – mixing (1)
- UncleJoe – mixing (2, 5)
- Wooki – mixing (3)
- Gu Jong-pil – mixing (4)
- Justin Oh – mixing (6), mastering (7)
- Kwon Nam-woo – mastering (1–6)
- Grace Yang – engineering (1–6), digital editing (2, 3, 5, 6)
- Yeo Min-soo – engineering (1, 3), digital editing (1, 3)
- Kim Min-hee – engineering (4)
- Kwon Eugene – engineering (6)
- Kang Dong-ho – mixing assistance (2, 5)
- Rose Hong – mixing assistance (4)

== Charts ==
=== Album ===
==== Weekly charts ====
Chart performance for The X
Chart (2025)	Peak position
Japanese Albums (Oricon)	14
Japanese Combined Albums (Oricon)	18
Japanese Download Albums (Billboard Japan)	36
South Korean Albums (Circle)	5
US Billboard 200	31
US World Albums (Billboard)	3

==== Monthly charts ====
Chart performance for The X
Chart (2025)	Peak position
Japanese Albums (Oricon)	47
South Korean Albums (Circle)	10

==== Year-end chart ====
Chart performance for The X
Chart (2025)	Position
South Korean Albums (Circle)	53

=== Song ===
Chart performance for "N the Front"
Chart (2025)	Peak position
South Korea (Circle)	65

== Certification and sales ==
Certification for The X
Region	Certification	Certified units/sales
South Korea (KMCA)	Platinum	441,166

== Release history ==
Release history and formats for The X
Region	Date	Format	Label
South Korea	September 1, 2025	CD; digital download; streaming	Starship Entertainment; Kakao Entertainment
Various	September 1, 2025	Digital download; streaming	Starship Entertainment; Kakao Entertainment
