= The Phase (EP) =

- Digital cover

EP by Monsta X
- Released: September 4, 2026
- Genre: K-pop
- Length: 19:23
- Language: Korean
- Labels: Starship; Kakao
- Producers: Dem Jointz; Shift K3y; Joohoney; Ye-Yo!; Laser; HWKIM; Calle Lehmann; Justin Oh

Monsta X chronology
Unfold (2026)	The Phase (2026)

Singles from The Phase
- 1. "Magic" Released: September 4, 2026

The Phase is the fourteenth extended play by the South Korean boy group Monsta X. It was released by Starship Entertainment and distributed by Kakao Entertainment on September 4, 2026.

== Background and release ==
On August 7, Starship Entertainment announced the released of Monsta X's EP The Phase on September 4 through a "coming soon" video, in a year and ahead of the group's The X: Nexus World Tour in North America. It will also be their first album without I.M due to mandatory military enlistment. On August 9, a track list video was released, revealing the EP's lead single "Magic". The individual member trailers, concept photos, and a mood sampler video had been subsequently released.

On September 7, they released a digital deluxe version of the EP, including a remix version of the lead single by Hyungwon under his DJ name titled "Magic (H.ONE Remix)" with Justin Oh and voice messages from the members titled "Dear Monbebe".

== Composition ==
The EP represents Monsta X's new phase. The tracks consist of multiple genres, ranging from hip-hop to R&B and from dance-pop to ballad, with a side of funk.

Joohoney participated in the composition of the lead single "Magic" and B-side tracks "Survivor" and "Electric Heart", and Hyungwon for B-side track "Sweet Night, Sweet Morning".

== Critical reception ==
The Phase received a favorable review from Forbes, highlighting the group's "experimental and new musical direction" while "maintaining their existing style".

== Commercial performance ==
The EP topped the weekly Circle Album Chart, dated August 30 – September 5, with 151,564 sales.

== Track listing ==
The Phase track listing
No.	Title	Lyrics	Music	Producer(s)	Length
1.	"Magic"	Bang Hye-hyun; Kim Anna (ARTiffect); Joohoney	Dem Jointz; Daniel Church; Shakka; Young Chance; MLite	Dem Jointz	2:37
2.	"Type X"	Black Nine; Joohoney	Shift K3y; Conor Blake; Jordan Shaw; Shakka; MLite	Shift K3y	3:00
3.	"Survivor"	Joohoney; Ye-Yo!; Laser	Joohoney; Ye-Yo!; Laser	Joohoney; Ye-Yo!; Laser	2:29
4.	"Electric Heart"	Joohoney; HWKIM	Joohoney; HWKIM	Joohoney; HWKIM	2:52
5.	"That's My Girl"	Moon Seol-li	Calle Lehmann; Arineh Karimi; Noak Hellsing; MLite	Lehmann	3:00
6.	"Sweet Night, Sweet Morning"	Hyungwon; Jantine Annika Heij; Justin Oh; Khema	Hyungwon; Heij; Oh	Oh	2:54
Total length:					16:52

Deluxe version bonus track
No.	Title	Lyrics	Music	Producer(s)	Length
7.	"Magic" (H.ONE Remix)	Bang Hye-hyun; Kim Anna (ARTiffect); Joohoney	Dem Jointz; Daniel Church; Shakka; Young Chance; MLite	Dem Jointz	2:31
Total length:					19:23

== Personnel ==
Credits adapted from Tidal.

=== Monsta X ===
- Shownu – lead vocals
- Minhyuk – lead vocals
- Kihyun – lead vocals
- Hyungwon – lead vocals
- Joohoney – rap vocals (all tracks), vocals (all tracks)

=== Additional musicians ===
- Sam Carter – background vocals (1, 2, 4, 5, 6)
- Kwon Han-eol – acoustic guitar (3)
- Lee Jin-ho – acoustic guitar, piano (3)
- Ohk Jae-won – background vocals, bass guitar, drums (3)
- DJ H.ONE – remixing (7)

=== Technical ===
- Jeong Eun-kyung – digital editing (1, 4), engineering (4)
- Kwon Nam-woo – mastering (1–6)
- Emiliano Olocco – mixing assistance, engineering (1)
- Patrizio "Teezio" Pigliapoco – mixing (1)
- Yeo Min-soo – engineering (1, 2, 5)
- Yang Yu-ngeun – engineering (1, 2, 4, 5, 6)
- Stay Tuned – mixing (2)
- Kim Dong-il – mixing assistance, engineering (3, 4)
- Gu Jong-pil – mixing (3, 4)
- Jeon Bu-yeon – digital editing (5, 6)
- Kang Dong-ho – mixing assistance, engineering (5)
- UncleJoe – mixing (5)
- Jantine Annika Heij – mixing (6)
- Justin Oh – mixing (6), remixing, mastering (7)

== Charts ==
=== Weekly charts ===
Chart performance for The Phase
Chart (2026)	Peak position
Japanese Albums (Oricon)	50
Japanese Download Albums (Billboard Japan)	42
South Korean Albums (Circle)	1
US Billboard 200	118
US Independent Albums (Billboard)	14
US World Albums (Billboard)	3

=== Monthly charts ===
Chart performance for The Phase
Chart (2026)	Peak position
South Korean Albums (Circle)	9

== Release history ==
Release history and formats for The Phase
Region	Date	Format	Label
South Korea	September 4, 2026	CD; digital download; streaming	Starship Entertainment; Kakao Entertainment
Various	September 4, 2026	Digital download; streaming	Starship Entertainment; Kakao Entertainment

== See also ==
- List of Circle Album Chart number ones of 2026
- List of K-pop albums on the Billboard charts
