= Now Project =

Compilation album by Monsta X
- Released: May 14, 2025; September 26, 2026
- Genre: K-pop
- Language: Korean
- Labels: Starship, Kakao

Monsta X chronology
Reason (2023)	Now Project (2025)	The X (2025)

Now Project is the first compilation album by the South Korean boy group Monsta X. It was digitally released by Starship Entertainment on May 14, 2025 for Vol.1 and on September 26, 2026 for Vol.2.

== Name ==
The title "Now" means "present" and also a word that is a reversed version of "Mon", which makes up the group's name. It symbolizes the identity and point in time that make up the current Monsta X.

== Background ==
=== Vol.1 ===
It contains ten re-recorded tracks from different albums released from 2021 to 2023, including the voice of Shownu, who was not able to participate in those albums due to military service, in commemoration of the group's 10th debut anniversary. The selected tracks also consisted of ones that the group members wrote, composed, and produced.

=== Vol.2 ===
It contains eight re-recorded title tracks from different albums released from debut to 2019, in commemoration of their fan club's anniversary. This connects Monsta X's beginnings and growth journey with the members current voices.

== Composition ==
=== Vol.1 ===
The tracks range from disco to songs with piano. It is often quoted as very diverse, but having quality.

== Track listing ==
Now Project Vol.1 track listing
No.	Title	Lyrics	Music	Arrangement	Length
1.	"Beautiful Liar"	Hyungwon; Joohoney; I.M; Brother Su; Kim Eung-ju	Ryan S. Jhun; Marc Sibley; Nathan Cunningham; Josh Cumbee; SLAY; AVIN; Lauren Aquilina; Marcus Andersson	Ryan S. Jhun; Space Primates	3:03
2.	"Love"	Joohoney; Ye-Yo!; I.M; Laser; Roydo; Brother Su	Joohoney; Ye-Yo!; Laser; Roydo	Joohoney; Ye-Yo!	3:35
3.	"Rush Hour"	Joohoney; Ye-Yo!; I.M; Laser; Sam Carter; Brother Su	Joohoney; Ye-Yo!; Sam Carter; Billy Carvin; th!nk; Brother Su; Bae Ki-hyun	Joohoney; Ye-Yo!	3:22
4.	"Autobahn"	I.M; Yoonseok; Wooki; Joohoney	I.M; Yoonseok; Wooki	I.M; Yoonseok; Wooki	3:17
5.	"Ride with U"	Flying Lab; Joohoney; I.M	Hong Kim; Jimmy Claeson	Hong Kim	3:24
6.	"Mercy"	Hyungwon; Jantine Annika Heij; Joohoney; I.M; Justin Oh	Hyungwon; Justin Oh; Jantine Annika Heij	Hyungwon; Justin Oh; Jantine Annika Heij	3:10
7.	"Saranghanda" (사랑한다)	Joohoney; Ye-Yo!; I.M; Laser	Joohoney; Ye-Yo!; Bae Ki-hyun; Laser	Joohoney; Ye-Yo!; Bae Ki-hyun	3:26
8.	"Lone Ranger"	Hyungwon; Joohoney; I.M; Justin Oh; Jantine Annika Heij	Hyungwon; Justin Oh; Jantine Annika Heij; Britt Pols	Hyungwon; Justin Oh	3:23
9.	"Deny"	I.M; Joohoney; Yoonseok; Wooki	I.M; Yoonseok; Wooki	I.M; Yoonseok; Wooki	2:53
10.	"It's Okay" (괜찮아)	Joohoney; I.M; Laser; Ye-Yo!	Joohoney; Laser; Ye-Yo!	Joohoney; Ye-Yo!	2:55
Total length:					32:28

Now Project Vol.2 track listing
No.	Title	Lyrics	Music	Arrangement	Length
1.	"Trespass" (무단침입)	Mad Clown; Kim Yi-na	Lissie; Assbrass; Lee Ji-hoon	Lissie; Assbrass	3:25
2.	"Hero (Broadcasting ver.)"	Punch Sound; Rhymer; Jooheon; I.M	Punch Sound	Punch Sound	3:38
3.	"Beautiful" (아름다워)	Galactika (별들의전쟁); Joohoney; I.M	Galactika (별들의전쟁)	Galactika (별들의전쟁); Athena	3:24
4.	"Dramarama"	Seo Ji-eum; Seo Jung-a; Joohoney; I.M	Andreas Öberg; Drew Ryan Scott	A-Dee; Stereo 14	3:06
5.	"Jealousy"	Seo Ji-eum; Joohoney; I.M	Harry Somerdahl; Shane Simmons; Hayden Bell	Harry Somerdahl; Shane Simmons; Hayden Bell; Stereo 14	3:27
6.	"Shoot Out"	Seo Ji-eum; Joohoney; I.M	Daniel Kim; Stereo14; Ti	Stereo14; Ti	3:27
7.	"Alligator"	Seo Ji-eum; Joohoney; I.M	Kevin Charge; Andreas Öberg; Drew Ryan Scott; Stereo14; Daniel Kim	Kevin Charge; Stereo14	3:12
8.	"Follow"	Seo Ji-eum; Brother Su; Joohoney; I.M	Daniel Kim; Willie Weeks; Andreas Öberg; Skylar Mones	Willie Weeks	3:33
Total length:					27:12

== Release history ==
Release history and formats for Now Project
Region	Date	Format	Label
South Korea	May 14, 2025	Digital download; streaming	Starship Entertainment; Kakao Entertainment
Various	May 14, 2025	Digital download; streaming	Starship Entertainment; Kakao Entertainment
South Korea	September 26, 2026	Digital download; streaming	Starship Entertainment; Kakao Entertainment
Various	September 26, 2026	Digital download; streaming	Starship Entertainment; Kakao Entertainment
