= Reason (Monsta X EP) =

EP by Monsta X
- Released: January 9, 2023
- Recorded: 2022
- Studios: Ingrid Studio; Klang Studio
- Genre: K-pop
- Length: 17:47
- Language: Korean
- Labels: Starship; Kakao

Monsta X chronology
Shape of Love (2022)	Reason (2023)	Now Project (2025)

Singles from Reason
- 1. "Beautiful Liar" Released: January 9, 2023

Reason (stylized as REASOИ) is the twelfth extended play by the South Korean boy group Monsta X. It was released by Starship Entertainment and distributed by Kakao Entertainment on January 9, 2023.

== Background and release ==
In December 2022, Monsta X announced their comeback by releasing the coming soon image of their twelfth EP Reason through their official SNS, in an intense black image, with the release date announced on January 9, 2023. It was the group's first comeback after contract renewal.

Joohoney participated in writing, composing, and arranging the tracks "Crescendo" and "It's Okay", while Hyungwon and I.M for tracks "Lone Ranger" and "Deny", respectively, as well as in writing the Korean lyrics for the title track "Beautiful Liar".

The physical EP was released in four standard versions, with the addition of the jewel cases version, KiT version, and cassette tape version.

== Composition ==
Reason depicts the story of their "reason" for building a presence through perfect teamwork. It contains the process of finding a clear reason for existence in various relationships and discovering the meaning of each other. It is also a means of finding the reason for their existence, which melted the ontological reflection of group members, that with efforts to face fear and compassion during fierce times, they were able to discover the reasons behind all their emotions and find value in their relationship with fans. This conveys the message that one does not need to find reason in relationships with underlying trust.

"Beautiful Liar" is a rhythmical and powerful punk rock-style song that sings the reason for love found in the most extreme and dangerous relationship. It has highly addictive beat and high-quality vocals and performance, providing a more intense sense of immersion. "Daydream" is a song that showed the group's soft and alluring side, while "Crescendo" creates a strange charm with the sound of a mixture of the Korean traditional musical instrument geomungo and taepyeongso. "Lone Ranger", a track that has an impressive unique Western sound, "Deny" is an irresistible R&B track, and "It's Okay" is a song which describes the heart of a coward who is still haunted by a breakup, but acts like everything is alright.

== Promotion ==
Starting in December 2022, the group sequentially released their track list, image teasers, concept films, and four versions of concept photos. Afterwards, the music video teasers for the title song on January 5 and 6, 2023. The album preview opened on January 8, with the release of the album and full-fledged comeback activity began on January 9. Monsta X showed contents related to their twelfth EP Reason, through Melon's online and offline new lighting service Melon Spotlight and original audio content service Melon Station. Their comeback showcase was held to commemorate the release of their album, as well as to showcase the stage of its b-side songs, through Naver Now on January 10, as well as the global K-pop rhythm game SuperStar Starship's commemorative mini-album Reason new song update release, which contains a special design with a deadly concept. Starting on January 12, they opened an exhibition and pop-up store to commemorate the release of their album, which consists of an exhibition that conveys the meaning and complex emotions contained in the album, and a store where one can purchase albums and official goods, each section tailored to the four concepts of Monsta X's new album, along with special event benefits such as lucky draws.

== Critical reception ==
Professional ratings
Review scores
Source	Rating
Clash	8/10

It was one of "The Most Anticipated Albums of 2023" by the entertainment and popular culture news website Uproxx. Certain prominent foreign media outlets from the United States and United Kingdom also praised and gave it favorable reviews.

Abbie Aitken of Clash described it as "an accumulation of Monsta X's past eight years", with six contrasting and neatly polished tracks, each showcasing "a different genre highlighting the group's versatility". They had "never felt limited to a singular genre", instead they "evolved their presence in the worlds of R&B, pop and rock".

=== Listicles ===
Name of critic or publication, name of listicle and rank
Critic/Publication	List	Rank	Ref.
Paste	The 20 Best K-pop Albums of 2023	18	
Uproxx	The Most Anticipated Albums of 2023	Placed (Note: All the albums and songs listed are either unranked or just alphabetically ranked.)	

== Commercial performance ==
Reason topped the Circle Chart's Retail Album Chart, for the week of January 8 to 14, with 156,265 copies sold, as well as the Circle Album Chart, with 389,972 copies sold. It also topped the Hanteo Chart's Weekly Physical Record Chart, which recorded 372,257.28 index points (album sales of 326,503 copies), as well as its Weekly World Chart, then its Weekly Global Authentication Chart on the following week.

In addition to its record, it entered the Melon's "Hall of Fame", which displays honorable records of domestic and foreign artists, with domestically released albums, joining the "Million Album", an album category which celebrates albums that have achieved more than one million streams within 24 hours of release, with a record of 3,869,100 total streams, being the highest of all the albums released in 2023, and had been commemorated in the "Million Album of All Time".

It debuted at number 26 on Oricon's Japanese Digital Albums, for the week of January 9 to 15, with 157 downloads, as well as at number 73 on Billboard Japan Hot Albums.

For the other tracks, they all entered the Billboard's Hot Trending Songs Chart, for the week of January 6 to 12, with "Deny" at number 1, "Crescendo" at number 5, "Lone Ranger" at number 6, "Daydream" at number 7, and "It's Okay" at number 9. The tracks also entered the Circle Digital Chart, for the week of January 8 to 14, with "Daydream" at number 117, "Lone Ranger" at number 122, "Crescendo" at number 124, "Deny" at number 126, and "It's Okay" at number 131.

== Track listing ==
Reason track listing
No.	Title	Lyrics	Music	Arrangement	Length
1.	"Beautiful Liar"	Hyungwon; Joohoney; I.M; Brother Su; Kim Eung-ju	Ryan S. Jhun; Marc Sibley; Nathan Cunningham; Josh Cumbee; SLAY; AVIN; Lauren Aquilina; Marcus Andersson	Ryan S. Jhun; Space Primates	3:03
2.	"Daydream"	Na Yeon-seo; Jung Joon-ho; Oh Yu-won; Lee Seung-min	Ryan S. Jhun; Terence Lam; Andrew Pedersen; Zev William Troxler; Cody Saintgnue	Ryan S. Jhun; TEE	2:26
3.	"Crescendo" (춤사위)	Joohoney; I.M; Ye-Yo!	Joohoney; Ye-Yo!	Joohoney; Ye-Yo!	3:05
4.	"Lone Ranger"	Hyungwon; Joohoney; I.M; Justin Oh; Jantine Annika Heij	Hyungwon; Justin Oh; Jantine Annika Heij; Britt Pols	Hyungwon; Justin Oh	3:23
5.	"Deny"	I.M; Joohoney; Yoonseok; Wooki	I.M; Yoonseok; Wooki	I.M; Yoonseok; Wooki	2:53
6.	"It's Okay" (괜찮아)	Joohoney; I.M; Laser; Ye-Yo!	Joohoney; Laser; Ye-Yo!	Joohoney; Ye-Yo!	2:55
Total length:					17:47

== Charts ==
=== Weekly charts ===
Chart performance for Reason
Chart (2023)	Peak position
Japanese Digital Albums (Oricon)	26
Japanese Hot Albums (Billboard Japan)	73
South Korean Albums (Circle)	1

=== Monthly chart ===
Chart performance for Reason
Chart (2023)	Peak position
South Korean Albums (Circle)	4

=== Year-end chart ===
Chart performance for Reason
Chart (2023)	Position
South Korean Albums (Circle)	58

== Certification and sales ==
Certification and sales for Reason
Region	Certification	Certified units/Sales
South Korea (KMCA)	Platinum	438,274

== Awards and nominations ==
Name of the award ceremony, year presented, award category and the result of the nomination
Award ceremony	Year	Category	Result	Ref.
Melon Music Awards	2023	Millions Top 10 Album	Nominated	

== Release history ==
Release history and formats for Reason
Region	Date	Format	Label
South Korea	January 9, 2023	CD; cassette; digital download; streaming	Starship Entertainment; Kakao Entertainment
Various	January 9, 2023	Digital download; streaming	Starship Entertainment; Kakao Entertainment

== See also ==
- List of certified albums in South Korea
- List of Circle Album Chart number ones of 2023
- List of K-pop songs on the Billboard charts
