= Lights (Joohoney EP) =

- Digital cover

EP by Joohoney
- Released: May 22, 2023
- Genre: K-pop
- Length: 16:12
- Language: Korean
- Label: Starship; Kakao

Joohoney chronology
Lights (2023)	Insanity (2026)

Singles from Lights
- 1. "Freedom" Released: May 22, 2023

Lights is the debut extended play by the South Korean rapper Joohoney. It was released by Starship Entertainment and distributed by Kakao Entertainment on May 22, 2023. The EP contains six tracks, including the title track "Freedom".

== Background and release ==
On April 28, several South Korean news outlets reported that Joohoney will be releasing his first solo album for next month, which was later been confirmed by Starship Entertainment. On April 30, Starship Entertainment released a logo video and an image which were posted on the official SNS channel of Monsta X and were revealed to be the initials J and H for Joohoney. In this video, released along with the image, the two windows rotate with a cool sound and finally find a point of contact in the middle and intersect. On May 1, he released a coming soon image, with the album title Lights and the release date being on May 22. On May 17, Joohoney revealed his documentary film titled Turn on the Lights, which will show behind-the-scene footages of the album's overall production process. On May 22, he held a Release Talk Live to commemorate the release of Lights through Monsta X's official YouTube channel.

The physical EP was released in three standard versions, along with a jewel case version and a KiT version.

== Composition ==
Lights contains Joohoney's troubles and growth process, from the fierce past to the present, to find the true self, and the future he draws together with his fans. This also shows his intensity, sorrow, and boyish beauty, which yearned for freedom, and gave a deep lingering effect.

For its tracks, "Freedom" is an impressive song with a reversal composition that harmonizes the lyrical feeling of piano and strings with the strong atmosphere of hip-hop, then "Hype Energy" is a hip-hop genre, composed entirely of rap, "Voice" is a song that expresses our own voice, "Evolution" melted down the message that true evolution can be achieved only when we look back on ourselves, "Monologue" is a song which contains reminiscences of the past, when he only pursued vague dreams before his dark debut, and "Don't Worry, Be Happy" is a tribute song for fans, appreciating the promises of the past, present, and future.

== Critical reception ==
Professional ratings
Review scores
Source	Rating
Clash	7/10

Abbie Aitken of Clash described Lights as an album that "represents Joohoney as an artist" and "conveys a sense of intimacy and personality that has not been seen before", while also adding that the entire album feels like he has hidden his "musicality", opting to showcase a "greater range both in terms of vocals and genre".

Name of critic or publication, name of listicle and rank
Critic/Publication	List	Rank	Ref.
Billboard	The 25 Best K-pop Albums of 2023	11	

== Commercial performance ==
Lights placed at numbers six and twenty-nine on the Circle Album Chart, for the week of May 21 to 27, with 73,720 copies sold. It also placed at number three and number one on the Hanteo Chart's Weekly Physical Record Chart, which recorded 78,134.66 index points (album sales of 69,056 copies) and Weekly Global Authentication Chart, respectively.

"Freedom" charted at number 105 on the Circle Digital Chart, for the week of May 21 to 27, with 3,697,614 digital points. This also became a hot topic or viral on TikTok, gathering a total of more than 20 million views.

== Track listing ==
Lights track listing
No.	Title	Lyrics	Music	Arrangement	Length
1.	"Freedom"	Joohoney; Ye-Yo!; BK	Joohoney; Ye-Yo!; Laser	Joohoney; Ye-Yo!	3:31
2.	"Hype Energy"	Joohoney; Ye-Yo!	Joohoney; Ye-Yo!	Joohoney; Ye-Yo!	2:25
3.	"Voice"	Joohoney; Ye-Yo!	Joohoney; Ye-Yo!	Joohoney; Ye-Yo!	1:56
4.	"Evolution"	Joohoney; Ye-Yo!; Laser; BK	Joohoney; Ye-Yo!; Laser	Joohoney; Ye-Yo!	2:16
5.	"Monologue" (feat. G.Soul)	Joohoney; Ye-Yo!; G.Soul	Joohoney; Ye-Yo!; G.Soul	Joohoney; Ye-Yo!	3:06
6.	"Don't Worry, Be Happy"	Joohoney; Ye-Yo!	Joohoney; Ye-Yo!	Joohoney; Ye-Yo!	2:55
Total length:					16:12

== Charts ==
=== Album ===
==== Weekly chart ====
Chart performance for Lights
Chart (2023)	Peak position
South Korean Albums (Circle)	6

==== Monthly chart ====
Chart performance for Lights
Chart (2023)	Peak position
South Korean Albums (Circle)	19

=== Songs ===
==== Weekly chart ====
Chart performance for "Freedom"
Chart (2023)	Peak position
South Korea (Circle)	105

== Certification and sales ==
Certification and sales for Lights
Region	Certification	Certified units/sales
South Korea	—	80,131

== Release history ==
Release history and formats for Lights
Region	Date	Format	Label
South Korea	May 22, 2023	CD; digital download; streaming	Starship Entertainment; Kakao Entertainment
Various	May 22, 2023	Digital download; streaming	Starship Entertainment; Kakao Entertainment
