= List of Circle Album Chart number ones of 2026 =

The Circle Album Chart is a South Korean record chart that ranks the best-selling albums and EPs in South Korea. It is part of the Circle Chart, which launched in February 2010 as the Gaon Chart. The data is compiled by the Ministry of Culture, Sports and Tourism and the Korea Music Content Industry Association based upon weekly/monthly physical album sales by major South Korean distributors such as Kakao Entertainment, YG Plus, Sony Music Korea, Warner Music Korea, Universal Music and Dreamus.

== Weekly charts ==
List of number-one albums on the weekly Circle Album Chart in 2026
Week ending date	Album	Artist	Weekly sales	Ref.
January 3	&Our Vibe	Say My Name	154,182	
January 10	Yesweare	Idntt	368,139	
January 17	The Sin: Vanish	Enhypen	1,803,105	
January 24	Reverxe	Exo	678,262	
January 31	Color Outside the Lines	Cortis	200,150	
February 7	Golden Hour: Part.4	Ateez	614,106	
February 14	Golden Hour: Part.4	Ateez	193,265	
February 21	The Sin: Vanish	Enhypen	23,710	
February 28	Deadline	Blackpink	1,750,692	
March 7	Deadline	Blackpink	132,421	
March 14	Unique	P1Harmony	385,753	
March 21	Arirang	BTS	3,803,910	
March 28	Arirang	BTS	367,639	
April 4	Biggest Fan	Irene	214,744	
April 11	My First Kick	KickFlip	239,345	
April 18	7th Year: A Moment of Stillness in the Thorns	Tomorrow X Together	1,645,127	
April 25	Ode to Love	NCT Wish	1,397,219	
May 2	No Tragedy	TWS	916,775	
May 9	GreenGreen	Cortis	1,468,919	
May 16	Heavy Serenade	Nmixx	279,657	
May 23	Pureflow Pt. 1	Le Sserafim	570,408	
May 30	Lemonade	Aespa	926,543	
June 6	New Wav	Treasure	1,001,974	
June 13	Home	BoyNextDoor	899,442	
June 20	II	Riize	984,175	
June 27	Golden Hour: Part.5	Ateez	741,923	
July 4	V8	V8	558,725	
July 11	No Labels: Part 02	Yeonjun	581,091	
July 18	Itsnotover	Idntt	230,950	
July 25	GreenGreen	Cortis	114,968	
August 1	.exe	Nouera	216,003	
August 8	This & That	Stray Kids	3,124,490	
August 15	Vision Wings	WayV	163,377	
August 22	The Sin: Bliss	Enhypen	1,704,166	
August 29	Unbreakable: 少年Beast	Alpha Drive One	962,142	
September 5	The Phase	Monsta X	151,564	
September 12	Mark on Me	&Team	1,295,214	
September 19	Gogo	Young Tak	295,713	
September 26	GreenGreen	Cortis	119,781	
October 3	256th Note	Close Your Eyes	616,176	
October 10	Kick Off the Wall Pt. 1	KickFlip	328,631	
October 17	I Spy	NCT Wish	1,266,263	
October 24	Dreamscape	JxJ	802,030	
October 31	Looks Can Kill	Ive	588,958	
November 7	To Us	TWS	768,577	
November 14	Golden Hour: Part.6	Ateez	998,218	

== Monthly charts ==
List of number-one albums on the monthly Circle Album Chart in 2026
Month	Album	Artist	Sales	Ref.
January	The Sin: Vanish	Enhypen	2,030,651	
February	Deadline	Blackpink	1,750,692	
March	Arirang	BTS	4,175,303	
April	7th Year: A Moment of Stillness in the Thorns	Tomorrow X Together	1,668,464	
May	GreenGreen	Cortis	1,695,155	
June	II	Riize	1,018,651	
July	No Labels: Part 02	Yeonjun	687,454	
August	This & That	Stray Kids	3,279,730	
September	Mark on Me	&Team	1,391,324	
October	I Spy	NCT Wish	1,271,489	
