= Beautiful Liar (Monsta X song) =

Single by Monsta X

from the album Reason
- Language: Korean
- Released: January 9, 2023
- Recorded: 2022
- Studio: Ingrid Studio; Klang Studio
- Genre: K-pop; hip hop; punk-rock; glam metal; dance-pop
- Length: 3:03
- Label: Starship; Kakao
- Composers: Ryan S. Jhun; Marc Sibley; Nathan Cunningham; Josh Cumbee; SLAY; AVIN; Lauren Aquilina; Marcus Andersson
- Lyricists: Joohoney; Hyungwon; I.M; Brother Su; Kim Eung-ju
- Producers: Ryan S. Jhun; Space Primates

Monsta X singles chronology
"Love" (2022)	"Beautiful Liar" (2023)

Music video
- "Beautiful Liar" on YouTube

"Beautiful Liar" is a song recorded by the South Korean boy group Monsta X for their twelfth extended play Reason. It was released as the EP's lead single by Starship Entertainment and Kakao Entertainment on January 9, 2023.

== Background and release ==
In December 2022, Monsta X announced their comeback by releasing the coming soon image of their twelfth EP Reason through their official SNS, in an intense black image and the release date announced on January 9, 2023.

On December 20, the track listing was released, with "Beautiful Liar" confirmed as the lead single.

Joohoney, Hyungwon, and I.M participated in writing its Korean lyrics, alongside Brother Su and Kim Eung-ju.

The choreography's killing point expresses the feeling of a "snake" ruling the whole body, through the movement that seems to control the mouth from the arm, accompanied by a choreography of covering the entire face with one hand, and in which everyone leans their heads and bodies back.

== Composition ==
"Beautiful Liar" is a rhythmical and powerful punk rock-style song which sings the reason for love found in the most extreme and dangerous relationship, with a highly addictive beat and high-quality vocals and performance, providing a more intense sense of immersion. It is also known as a hip-hop and dance-based track with irresistible punk-rock influences, which give the song its earworm quality, a gorgeous blend of sonic intensity and sauciness.

== Music video ==
On January 5, Monsta X released the first teaser of the music video through their official SNS. It started with a tense scene, in which unknown people run in droves with a rhythmic beat. Led by I.M, who appears exuding a strong presence in a red leather outfit, the members walk towards somewhere creating a sandstorm. It ends with the two members, being put in a confrontation situation and running or charging towards each other. On January 6, they released the second teaser of the music video, which begins with an intense beat and sound. In the concert hall lit up with colorful lights, Monsta X is on the main stage and receiving cheers from many people, and performance made by the members is revealed little by little in the scene passing by with a sense of speed. At the end of the video, few of I.M's unique and attractive bass notes are revealed.

The music video, directed by Highqualityfish, was released alongside the song, through Starship Entertainment and 1theK's YouTube channels on January 9, 2023. It portrays their powerful performance from an abandoned warehouse as it catches on fire. Elsewhere in the video, it can be seen that, they stumble through a faceless crowd, as they reckon with their conflicting emotions. Tapping into the dangerous nature of love, the music video features the members performing in arena set ablaze, clad in leather ensembles, which capture the track's sonic potency in sleek choreographed moves and rebellious expressions. The music video shows the members of Monsta X take the stage in front of a crowd full of mysterious people dressed in all black, features imagery of chains and a horse in a red tent.

== Promotion ==
On January 10, their comeback showcase was held to commemorate the release of their twelfth EP Reason, including "Beautiful Liar", through Naver Now, along the release of the global K-pop rhythm game SuperStar Starship's limited-themed digital card for "Beautiful Liar". Monsta X also subsequently appeared on several music programs, including Mnet's M Countdown on January 12, KBS2's Music Bank on January 13, MBC's Show! Music Core on January 14, and SBS' Inkigayo on January 15.

== Critical reception ==
Professional ratings
Review scores
Source	Rating
IZM	3/5 stars

Jang Jun-hwan of IZM described "Beautiful Liar" as an "elegant pop grammar with various colors". Jang also added that "the sharp electric guitar and heavy drums, which seem to have been inspired by Kanye West's "Black Skinhead", have produced the existing wild beauty, but they did not miss the sense of creating the "killing part" which they learned from All About Luv and The Dreaming". Jang emphasized "I.M and Jooheon's raps, which alternately use power, draw tension over and over again, and Hyungwon's hook injects sweetness in the right place, that despite its light composition, the song still penetrates the ears excellently and announces its presence".

Taylor Glasby, writing for Dazed, said that as a curveball, it "dissects and reassembles its structure with steely precision", giving "heady and hypnotic, a teasing, persistent spiral of sound", which makes it a "slithery banger".

=== Listicles ===
Name of critic or publication, name of listicle and rank
Critic/Publication	List	Rank	Ref.
Dazed	The 50 Best K-pop Tracks of 2023	17	

== Commercial performance ==
"Beautiful Liar" charted at number 15 on the Circle Digital Chart for the week of January 8 to 14, while at number 8 on Billboard World Digital Song Sales chart, for the week of January 6 to 12. The track also charted at number 75 on the monthly Circle Digital Chart for the month of January.

Its music video ranked on YouTube's Rapidly Rising Video and topped the Music videos trending worldwide, while at number 5 on YouTube Korea popular music video, for the week of January 6 to 12, with 505,341 views.

== Credits and personnel ==
Credits adapted from Melon.

- Monsta X – vocals
- Joohoney – lyrics
- Hyungwon – lyrics
- I.M – lyrics
- Brother Su – lyrics
- Kim Eung-ju – lyrics
- Ryan S. Jhun – composition, arrangement
- Marc Sibley – composition
- Nathan Cunningham – composition
- Josh Cumbee – composition
- SLAY – composition
- AVIN – composition
- Lauren Aquilina – composition
- Marcus Andersson – composition
- Space Primates – arrangement

== Charts ==
=== Weekly charts ===
Chart performance for "Beautiful Liar"
Chart (2023)	Peak position
South Korea (Circle)	15
US World Digital Song Sales (Billboard)	8

=== Monthly chart ===
Chart performance for "Beautiful Liar"
Chart (2023)	Peak position
South Korea (Circle)	75

== Accolades ==
Music program award for "Beautiful Liar"
Program	Date	Ref.
Music Bank	January 20, 2023	

== Release history ==
Release history and formats for "Beautiful Liar"
Region	Date	Format	Label
South Korea	January 9, 2023	Digital download; streaming	Starship Entertainment; Kakao Entertainment
Various	January 9, 2023	Digital download; streaming	Starship Entertainment; Kakao Entertainment

== See also ==
- List of K-pop songs on the Billboard charts
- List of K-pop songs on the World Digital Song Sales chart
- List of Music Bank Chart winners (2023)
