= The Pinkfong Company =

South Korean entertainment company

- Type: Public
- Traded as: KRX: 403850
- Industry: Animation production
- Founded: June 2010; 16 years ago
- Headquarters: 5th Floor, 94 Myeongdal-ro, Seocho-dong, Seoul, South Korea
- Area served: Worldwide
- Key people: Kim Min-seok (CEO); Lee Seung-kyu (CFO); Park Hyun-woo (VP)
- Revenue: 93,861,865,441 won (2025)
- Number of employees: 200
- Website: thepinkfongcompany.com/en

The Pinkfong Company (Korean: 더핑크퐁컴퍼니) previously known as SmartStudy and Smart Books Media, is a South Korean entertainment company. Their brands and intellectual property include Pinkfong and Baby Shark, and they have produced original animated shows, world live tours, and interactive video games. On January 6, 2022, they changed their corporate name to The Pinkfong Company.

== History ==
=== Company formation ===
==== Parent company and founders ====
The Pinkfong Company was founded in June 2010 as Smart Study and Smart Books Media by three former game developers, CEO Kim Min-seok, CFO Lee Ryan Seung-kyu and VP Park Hyun-woo.

Kim, who was around thirty-years-old at the time, was a publisher and the oldest son of his family's business, Samsung Publishing Company Ltd., The Pinkfong Company's parent company, with his father, CEO Kim Jin-yong, and his grandfather, the company's founder, Kim Bong-kyu. The parent company, mainly publishes books for children and magazines for computer users, with another division operating food courts in highway service areas and a subsidiary operation that marketed stationery products. Kim joined the company, in preparation as a successor, in 2008, and, while there, he helped launch a self-directed program "Samsung English", and worked on content digitization and app development. He studied to be an information specialist at Yonsei University and worked at the game company Nexon while in college. After graduation, he was a developer and project manager at Hangame and also, worked at NHN.

The Pinkfong Company was formed by Kim, his close friend Park, who also worked at NHN, and Lee, who he met at Nexon. Lee had begun his career as an online community developer at Freechal.

==== Startup develops a strategy ====
While brainstorming ideas for the company, the thought of making video games was quickly dropped, because, as Lee said, “At that point, we were all tired of making games". The final choices were education and medicine, but as they had no expertise in medicine, they focused on education. With more ideas from Samsung Publishing, they decided to focus on the children's education market by making and uploading four music videos for Samsung Publishing's children's songs on their apps. The international response was good. “It was then that we realized that instead of making what we want, we should create content based on what the market wants,” Lee said.

Discussing what market they would focus on, Kim said reaching out to global customers was more viable, as potential customers were limited in South Korea, where the birthrate per year was around 400,000. They further planned to target pre-kindergarten or 2-year-old to kindergarten, looking to open offices in China and the U.S. to make local content geared for each of those markets. According to Lee, the U.S. users favored "interactive, actionable content such as writing letters on the tablet or taking pictures with the character", while Asian users preferred "one-way streaming video content". Based on results in South Korea and China, they focused on creating content in English and Spanish for the U.S. market, and started producing videos with its characters in several languages, including English, Chinese, Spanish and Russian; and operating their own mobile app providing content directly to viewers. Many of the creators at the company were from children's book publishing and many of the apps were based on chant melodies to attract children's attention.

They also added mobile VOD, comics, and finally, games. As the company grew, they continued their debate on games and entertainment versus education. "Education combined with entertainment, edutainment, is hard to achieve. If it's too much focused on games, it has less educational value, and if it's too much focused on education, it will need sugar-coating with game features", Lee said. Consequently, they returned to their forte in September, 2016, when they released a mobile game called “Monster Super League”. Kim said he understood the importance of child education, but thought about the expertise of team members who were prior game developers at Nexon or NCSoft, and who were also fathers.

They realized their market with international growth through Google and Apple app stores and expanded to IPTV in late 2013. They felt their willingness to understand subtle cultural differences instead of just enhancing language aspects benefited them. In particular, for Chinese marketing, they created new work using old Chinese fables and texts that Chinese children would know from kindergarten, and uploading them on native platforms like Youku, iQiyi and Tencent Video in China, where YouTube is banned.

=== Success with Pinkfong and "Baby Shark" ===
In August 2015, their big breakthrough occurred on YouTube with their popular character and brand Pinkfong, a magenta-colored animated fox, which was used in a "Baby Shark" song and dance video. It was launched in late 2015, and started going viral on YouTube in 2016, becoming the company's most popular series with 800 million views by September 2018. By 2018, the company reported 150 million people in 112 countries had downloaded its app. Baby Shark Boy also known as Park Geon-roung, made his debut on August 19, 2026, with "Wave" featuring Joohoney from Monsta X. Parts of the original music video of "Baby Shark" were used for his debut as he was the boy who starred in it.

== Finance and sales ==
By 2014, the parent company, Samsung Publishing, was seeing an increased net profit from its new subsidiary The Pinkfong Company, and in 2017, Samsung Publishing sales were approximately $160 million. In 2015, SmartStudy's sales were 9.5 billion won (about US$8.5 million). In 2016, The Pinkfong Company's sales increased by 80 percent, due to revenue from YouTube and apps sales, to 17.5 billion won (about US$15.5 million), with overseas sales accounting for 65 percent. In 2017, The Pinkfong Company's sales were 27.2 billion won (about US$24,127,000) with an operating profit of 1.9 billion won (about US$1,685,000).

In September 2018, Samsung Publishing's stocks "soared" by more than 76 percent after Pinkfong's Baby Shark song charted on the UK Top 40 at number 37. In November 2018, industry sources were predicting that The Pinkfong Company was preparing to go public in 2020, with CEO Kim the biggest shareholder with 23.1 percent stake and Samsung Publishing which owns 20.8 percent.
