= Deadline (EP) =

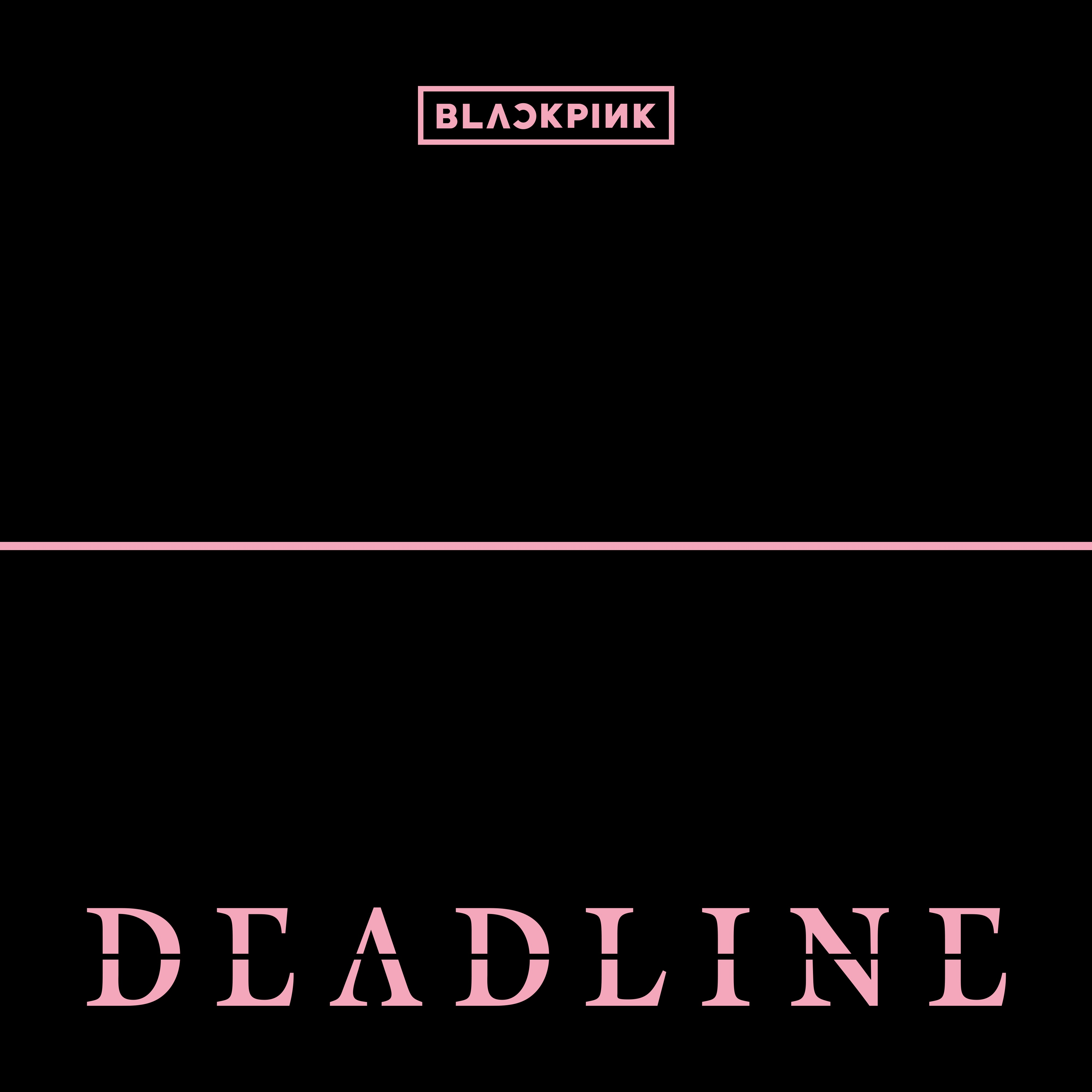
- Digital cover (Note: On the clean version of the album cover, the color palette is inverted: the background is pink, while the group's logo, typography, and central line graphic are rendered in black.)

EP by Blackpink
- Released: February 27, 2026
- Recorded: 2025–2026
- Studio: The Black Label (Seoul)
- Length: 14:53
- Languages: English; Korean
- Label: YG
- Producers: 24; Boaz van de Beatz; Cirkut; Diplo; Dr. Luke; Ido; Kush; Vaughn Oliver; Teddy; Tobias Wincorn

Blackpink chronology
Born Pink (2022)	Deadline (2026)

Singles from Deadline
- 1. "Jump" Released: July 11, 2025; 2. "Go" Released: February 27, 2026

Deadline is the third Korean extended play (fourth overall) by South Korean girl group Blackpink. It was released on February 27, 2026, by YG Entertainment. Consisting of five tracks, the EP marks the group's first project since their second studio album, Born Pink, in 2022, and their first to be distributed by The Orchard instead of Interscope Records.

Deadline was preceded by the lead single, "Jump", which debuted at number one on the Billboard Global 200 and topped the national charts in several countries. It also peaked at number two on South Korea's Circle Digital Chart and number 28 on the US Billboard Hot 100. The second single, "Go", was released alongside the album. Ahead of the EP's release, Blackpink embarked on the Deadline World Tour in July 2025, their first all-stadium tour.

Deadline received positive reviews from critics, who praised the group's musical evolution. Upon release, it broke the record for the highest first-day and first-week sales for a K-pop girl group in history, selling 1.46 million copies in one day and 1.77 million copies in one week. The EP debuted at number one on the Circle Album Chart with 1.75 million copies sold in less than two days. In the United States, it became Blackpink's third top-ten album on the Billboard 200 at number eight. The album has since been certified million by the Korea Music Content Association (KMCA) for selling one million copies.

== Background ==
In December 2023, YG Entertainment announced that Blackpink renewed their contracts for group activities and promised a new album and world tour to come. Yang Hyun-suk confirmed a 2025 comeback and world tour from the group in a July 2024 video detailing the label's upcoming plans. In May 2025, Lisa shared in an interview with Variety that they "were in the studio a few days ago" and that a new album was in development.

In August 2025, South Korean news outlet My Daily Korea reported that Blackpink was preparing an EP for release in November and had already completed a photoshoot for the album's jacket cover, to which YG Entertainment responded, saying they will announce it later through official promotions. In a YG Announcement video posted on YouTube on August 17, Yang Hyun-suk revealed that the group was currently in the process of working on a new EP with the hopes of releasing the project in November "at the latest".

In October, South Korean news outlet Xsports News reported that Blackpink was aiming to release their album in December; YG Entertainment responded that the date was yet to be confirmed. On October 20, the label confirmed that Blackpink would begin filming the music video for their new song that week and that the album was in its "final stages" of preparations to ensure the highest musical quality. In December, industry insiders indicated that the anticipated comeback had been postponed to January 2026. On January 14, Blackpink officially announced their third Korean extended play, Deadline, due for release on February 27 via YG Entertainment. Pre-orders for the extended play were made available later that day.

== Promotion ==
=== Marketing ===
Following the announcement of Deadline on January 14, 2026, Blackpink released the first set of concept photos for the EP on January 29, featuring grayscale close-ups of each member in all-white outfits with their full faces hidden. On February 5, Blackpink revealed the EP's tracklist of five songs, including the album's second single and lead track "Go". On February 9, the group unveiled visual posters for each member labelled the "Statue" and "Red Light" versions, marking the first reveal of their complete portraits. On February 20, Blackpink released the "Deadline" version poster, featuring a full-group photo of the group in all-black outfits.

To celebrate the release of Deadline, Blackpink launched a collaborative project with the National Museum of Korea in partnership with Spotify, marking the first time a K-pop act participated in a large-scale collaboration with the museum. The museum's exterior and outdoor plaza was illuminated in pink lighting every night during the event period from February 27 to March 8, while inside a listening zone for the EP was set up at the museum's "Path to History" section. A reserved pre-listening session took place a day before the EP's release on February 26. Additionally, an audio guide recorded by Blackpink on eight select artifacts was made available, with Jisoo and Jennie providing Korean narration, Rosé in English, and Lisa in Thai. Pop-up stores ran from February 29 to March 8 in Seoul selling merchandise and a limited "Seoul Edition" of Deadline with an exclusive album cover mixing Blackpink's style with traditional Korean aesthetics. Further pop-up stores opened in a number of cities including Hong Kong and Macau.

=== Singles ===
Deadline's lead single "Jump" was released through YG Entertainment in a new distribution partnership with the Orchard on July 11, 2025. In an interview with Vogue Korea, Lisa announced that "Jump" was a pre-release single from the group's upcoming album. "Jump" debuted at number one on the Billboard Global 200, becoming the group's third number-one song. The song peaked at number one in Malaysia, Singapore, Taiwan, Thailand, and Vietnam, and number two on South Korea's Circle Digital Chart. It also debuted at number 28 on the US Billboard Hot 100, earning the group their milestone tenth entry on the chart. "Go" was released alongside the album on February 27, 2026, as the album's lead track and second single.

=== Tour ===
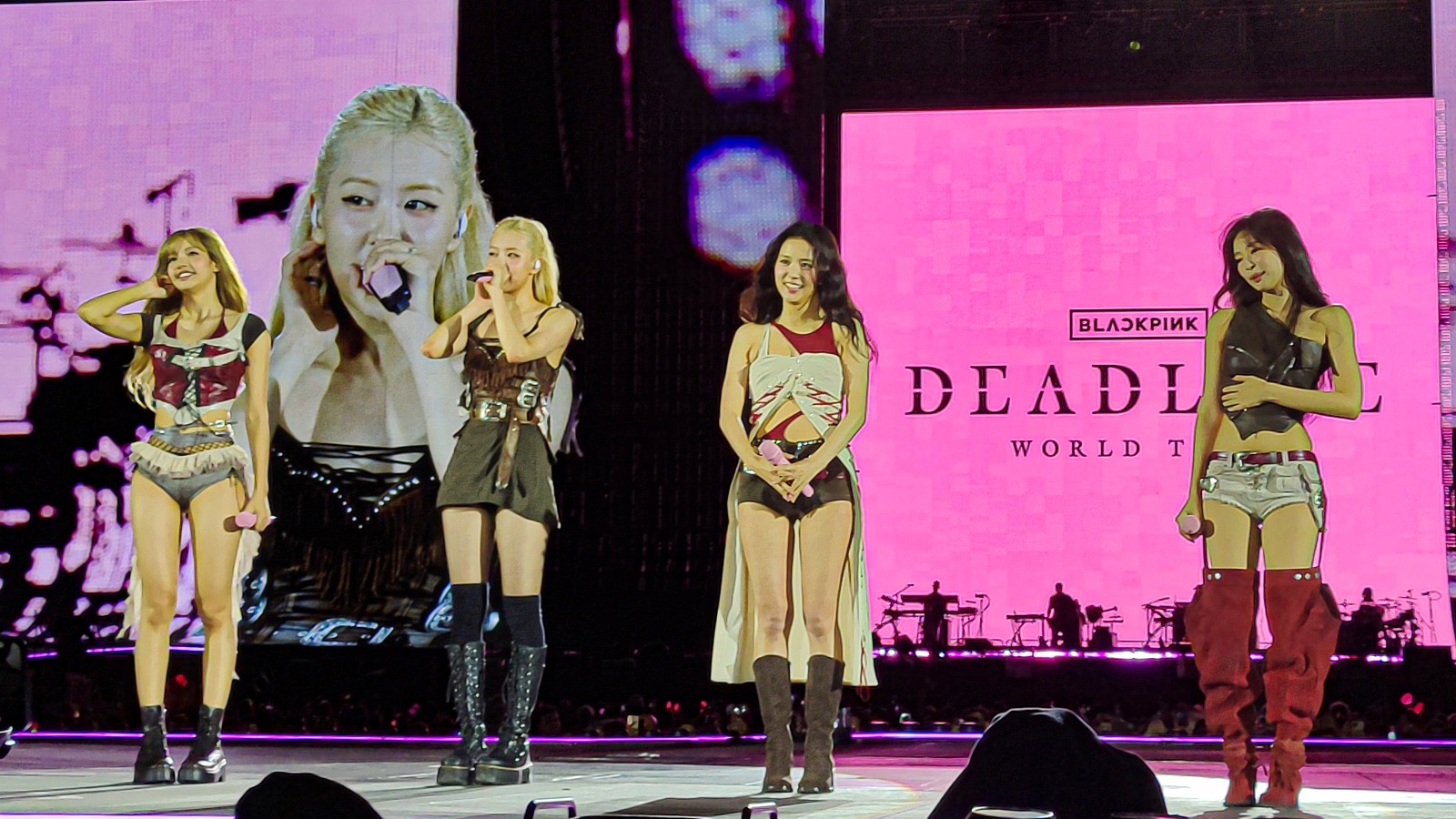
Blackpink performing on the Deadline World Tour in Milan

On February 19, 2025, YG Entertainment unveiled dates for a stadium tour with shows in South Korea, North America, and Europe, including London's Wembley Stadium, making them the first K-pop girl group to perform at the venue. On May 16, Blackpink announced Deadline World Tour as the tour's official title. Due to demand, additional shows were announced for Europe at Wembley Stadium and Paris' Stade de France. Shows were also added at Citi Field in New York City, Rogers Stadium in Toronto, and SoFi Stadium in Los Angeles due to North American tickets selling out. On May 27, YG Entertainment announced dates for the Asia leg of the tour. The tour commenced on July 5, 2025, at Goyang Stadium in Goyang, South Korea, and concluded on January 26, 2026, at the Kai Tak Stadium in Hong Kong. At the first show in Goyang, Blackpink debuted the EP's pre-release single, "Jump", for the first time.

== Music and lyrics ==
The first track, "Jump", is a hardstyle, and dance pop song that incorporates elements of club music, synth-pop, techno, and EDM, and opens with a "striking guitar riff that evokes the feel of a Western film." Its lyrics describe the joy of a night out with the girls, discussing how sisterhood leads to liberation, and encourage everyone to get on the dance floor and jump.

== Critical reception ==
Professional ratings
Aggregate scores
Source	Rating
Metacritic	74/100
Review scores
Source	Rating
AllMusic	4/5 stars
Associated Press	4/5 stars
Clash	8/10
IZM	2.5/5 stars
Pitchfork	5.7/10
Rolling Stone	4/5 stars
Slant	2.5/5 stars

According to the review aggregator Metacritic, Deadline received "generally favorable reviews" based on a weighted average score of 74 out of 100 from five critic scores.

In a review for the Associated Press, Cristina Jaleru rated Deadline four out of five stars, describing it as a "satisfying chapter in the band's discography". Robert Sheffield of Rolling Stone noted the group's evolution, observing that the members successfully integrated their individual artistic growth into their signature style. In a review for AllMusic, Neil Z. Yeung awarded the album four out of five stars, calling it "short and sweet" while noting that it highlights the "different styles and moods the quartet is capable of" while hinting at "exciting directions for a future full-length". Clash's Robin Murray positively described the EP as a "perfectly judged return" for the group. He further highlighted the synergy of each member following each of their solo projects.

Jeong Harim of IZM praised the "strong charisma" of "Go" but criticized other songs for lack of individuality. Pitchfork's Alex Ramos characterized Deadline as a formulaic, "bare minimum" effort that deviated from what he described as their signature K-pop style. Writing for Slant, Paul Attard was critical, giving the EP two-and-a-half stars out of five. While praising the first track "Jump", he argued that the rest of the project "steadily slumps in quality after its opening salvo".

== Awards and nominations ==
Awards and nominations
Year	Organization	Award	Result	Ref.
2026	K-World Dream Awards	Best Album Award	Won	
2026	MAMA Awards	Album of the Year	Pending	
2026	SEC Awards	International Album/EP of the Year	Nominated	

== Commercial performance ==
Upon release, Deadline sold 1,461,785 copies in its first day and broke the record for the highest first-day sales for a K-pop girl group in Hanteo Chart history, surpassing Aespa's My World (2023). With this, Blackpink also became the first girl group in Hanteo Chart history to have two or more albums sell over 1 million copies on the first day of release, following their previous album Born Pink, which sold 1.01 million copies in 2022. Deadline sold 1,774,577 copies on the Hanteo Chart in its first week following its release, setting a new record for a K-pop girl group and surpassing Born Pink by 230,000 copies. On the Circle Album Chart, Deadline debuted at number one with 1,756,992 copies sold in one and a half days of tracking. It also debuted at number one on the Circle Retail Album Chart, while Blackpink topped the Circle Social Chart. In response to the sales, YG Entertainment stated that "Global demand for the album has far exceeded our initial expectations, and we are currently in the process of additional production." In the United States, Deadline became Blackpink's third top-ten album on the Billboard 200, debuting at number eight with 52,000 album-equivalent units. The sum included 41,000 pure album sales, resulting in a number two debut on the Billboard Top Album Sales chart, and 11,000 stream-equivalent sales from 11.46 million on-demand streams.

== Track listing ==
Deadline track listing
No.	Title	Writer(s)	Producer(s)	Length
1.	"Jump" (뛰어)	Teddy; Thomas Wesley Pentz; 24; Zikai; Claudia Valentina; Jumpa; Malachiii; Jesse Bluu; Boaz de Jong; Zecca; Ape Drums	24; Teddy; Diplo; Boaz van de Beatz	2:45
2.	"Go"	Chris Martin; Henry Walter; Rosé; Danny Chung; Jisoo; Jennie; Lisa	Cirkut; Teddy	3:15
3.	"Me and My"	Lukasz Gottwald; Theron Thomas; Vaughn Oliver; Tobias Wincorn; Rocco Valdes; Jelli Dorman	Dr. Luke; Oliver; Wincorn	2:53
4.	"Champion"	Gottwald; Thomas; Ejae	Dr. Luke	2:53
5.	"Fxxxboy"	Kush; Ido; Zikai; Courtlin Jabrae Edwards; Tommy Brown; Vince	Teddy; Kush; Ido	3:08
Total length:				14:53

=== Notes ===
- "Jump" and "Go" are stylized in all uppercase.
- "Me and My" is stylized in sentence case.

== Personnel ==
Credits adapted from Apple Music.

- Blackpink – vocals (all tracks)
- Cirkut – keyboards (track 2)
- Chris Martin – piano, keyboards, acoustic guitar, background vocals (track 2)
- Bella Corich – background vocals, additional engineering (track 2)
- Denise Carite – background vocals (track 2)
- Shaneka Hamilton – background vocals (track 2)
- Stevie Mackey – background vocals (track 2)
- Dr. Luke – programming, keyboards, percussion (tracks 3–4); background vocals (track 3); guitar, bass (track 4)
- Vaughn Oliver – programming, keyboards, percussion (track 3)
- Tobias Wincorn – programming, keyboards, percussion (track 3)
- Theron Thomas – background vocals (track 3)
- Shelailai – background vocals (tracks 3–4)
- Steven Wolf – drums (track 4)
- Joey Farrell – recorder, assistant engineering (track 4)
- Ejae – background vocals (track 4)
- Ava James – background vocals (track 4)
- Teddy – vocal production (tracks 2–5)
- Serban Ghenea – mixing (track 2)
- Clint Gibbs – mixing (tracks 3–4)
- Josh Gudwin – mixing (track 5)
- Chris Gehringer – mastering (tracks 2–5)
- Tate McDowell – engineering, additional production (track 2)
- Bill Rahko – engineering, additional production (track 2)
- Gun Yin – engineering (tracks 2–5)
- Carl Bang – engineering (tracks 2–5)
- Robert Palma – engineering (track 2)
- Kalani Thompson – engineering, vocal production (tracks 3–4)
- Tyler Sheppard – assistant engineering (tracks 3–4)
- Grant Horton – assistant engineering (tracks 3–4)

== Charts ==
=== Weekly charts ===
Weekly chart performance
Chart (2026)	Peak position
Australia (ARIA) (Note: Per Australian chart rules, albums of five tracks or fewer chart on the singles chart.)	30
Austrian Albums (Ö3 Austria)	1
Belgian Albums (Ultratop Flanders)	6
Belgian Albums (Ultratop Wallonia)	4
Canadian Albums (Billboard)	25
Croatian International Albums (HDU)	10
Czech Albums (ČNS IFPI)	30
Dutch Albums (Album Top 100)	21
French Albums (SNEP)	2
German Albums (Offizielle Top 100)	4
German Pop Albums (Offizielle Top 100)	3
Greek Albums (IFPI)	52
Hungarian Albums (MAHASZ)	9
Irish Albums (Official Charts)	19
Irish Independent Albums (IRMA)	2
Japanese Albums (Oricon)	9
Japanese Combined Albums (Oricon)	9
Japanese Hot Albums (Billboard Japan)	11
New Zealand Albums (RMNZ)	12
Portuguese Albums (AFP)	9
Scottish Albums (Official Charts)	5
South Korean Albums (Circle)	1
Slovak Albums (ČNS IFPI)	34
Spanish Albums (Promusicae)	5
Swedish Albums (Sverigetopplistan)	31
Swiss Albums (Schweizer Hitparade)	6
UK Albums (Official Charts)	11
UK Independent Albums (Official Charts)	3
US Billboard 200	8
US Independent Albums (Billboard)	3

=== Monthly charts ===
Monthly chart performance
Chart (2026)	Peak position
Japanese Albums (Oricon)	33
South Korean Albums (Circle)	1

== Certifications and sales ==
Certifications and sales for Deadline
Region	Certification	Certified units/sales
France (SNEP)	Gold	50,000^{‡}
Japan	—	14,784
South Korea (KMCA)	Million	1,988,245
United States	—	41,000
^{‡} Sales+streaming figures based on certification alone.

== Release history ==
Release history
Region	Date	Format(s)	Label(s)	Ref.
Various	February 27, 2026	CD; digital download; streaming	YG	

== See also ==
- List of best-selling albums in South Korea
- List of certified albums in South Korea
- List of best-selling girl group albums
- List of Circle Album Chart number ones of 2026
- List of K-pop albums on the Billboard charts
