= Unfold (Monsta X album) =

- Digital cover

Studio album by Monsta X
- Released: April 3, 2026
- Genre: Pop
- Length: 30:15
- Language: English
- Label: Intertwine

Monsta X chronology
The X (2025)	Unfold (2026)	The Phase (2026)

Singles from Unfold
- 1. "Baby Blue" Released: November 14, 2025; 2. "Growing Pains" Released: February 5, 2026; 3. "Heal" Released: April 3, 2026

Unfold is the tenth and the third English-language studio album by the South Korean boy group Monsta X. It was released by Intertwine on April 3, 2026.

== Background ==
On March 2, Starship Entertainment announced that Monsta X will release an album, titled Unfold, on April 3. It was accompanied by a "coming soon" image, with a composition that resembled a glimpse of a document, papers with stamps and clips added to the meaning of "records". The album featured the singles "Baby Blue", which was pre-released in November 2025, and "Growing Pains", which was pre-released in February. The single "Heal" was released alongside the album in April.

== Composition ==
Unfold reveals the stories that Monsta X has kept folded over the past ten years, bringing out everything, from wounds, growing pains, fading love, to inner voices they themselves were unaware of. It depicts an "emotional journey" that eventually returns to oneself and a work that captures a "deeply human story".

== Promotion ==
In April, Monsta X appeared on several US news and entertainment programs such as Good Morning America, Good Day L.A., The Kelly Clarkson Show, and iHeartRadio. They also garnered attention from major media outlets such as Billboard, Forbes, and Access Hollywood for their performance on the said programs. Several pop-up stores were opened in US cities including New York City.

== Commercial performance ==
The album debuted at number seventeen on the weekly Circle Album Chart, dated March 29 – April 4, with 20,396 sales. It also debuted at number forty-one on the US Billboard 200 and number two on its Top Album Sales.

The single "Heal" entered the US Mainstream Top 40 of Billboard, placing at number thirty-three as its highest, for four consecutive weeks.

== Track listing ==
Unfold track listing
No.	Title	Lyrics	Music	Producer(s)	Length
1.	"Heal"	Jeoff Harris; Lindy Robbins; Alma Goodman	Harris; Robbins; Goodman	Harris	3:59
2.	"Growing Pains"	Alexander Stewart; Rollo; Whakaio Taahi	Stewart; Rollo; Taahi	Stewart	3:06
3.	"Baby Blue"	Lionel Crasta; Lita Caputo; Nate Cyphert	Crasta; Caputo; Cyphert	Crasta	3:16
4.	"This!"	Chelsea Lena; Mozella; Alejandro Fernández; Joey Barrios	Lena; Mozella; Fernández; Barrios	CASHAE	2:39
5.	"Before You Met Me"	Jake Davis; Emily Haber; Ethan C. Davis	Jake Davis; Haber; Ethan C. Davis	Jake Davis	3:26
6.	"Glass Half Empty"	Sam Sumser; Sean Small; Daniel Breland; Vwillz	Sumser; Small; Breland; Vwillz	Sumser; Small	2:42
7.	"Main Attraction"	Marty Maro; Oliver Frid; Darius Coleman; Lita	Maro; Frid; Coleman; Lita	Maro; Frid	3:08
8.	"Enemies with Benefits"	Pat Morrissey; Kill Dave; Rollo	Morrissey; Dave; Rollo	Morrissey; Dave	2:48
9.	"On Our Way"	Dave Stewart; Freddy Wexler; Yash	Stewart; Wexler; Yash	Stewart	3:00
10.	"Sorry to Myself"	Ryan "Rykeyz" Williamson; David Charles Fischer	Williamson; Fischer	Williamson	2:11
Total length:					30:15

== Charts ==
Chart performance for Unfold
Chart (2026)	Peak position
South Korean Albums (Circle)	17
US Billboard 200	41

Chart performance for "Heal"
Chart (2026)	Peak position
US Mainstream Top 40 (Billboard)	33

== Awards and nominations ==
Name of the award ceremony, year presented, award category and the result of the nomination
Award ceremony	Year	Category	Result	Ref.
SEC Awards	2026	International Album/EP of the Year	Pending	

== See also ==
- List of K-pop albums on the Billboard charts
- List of K-pop songs on the Billboard charts
