= Jantine Annika Heij =

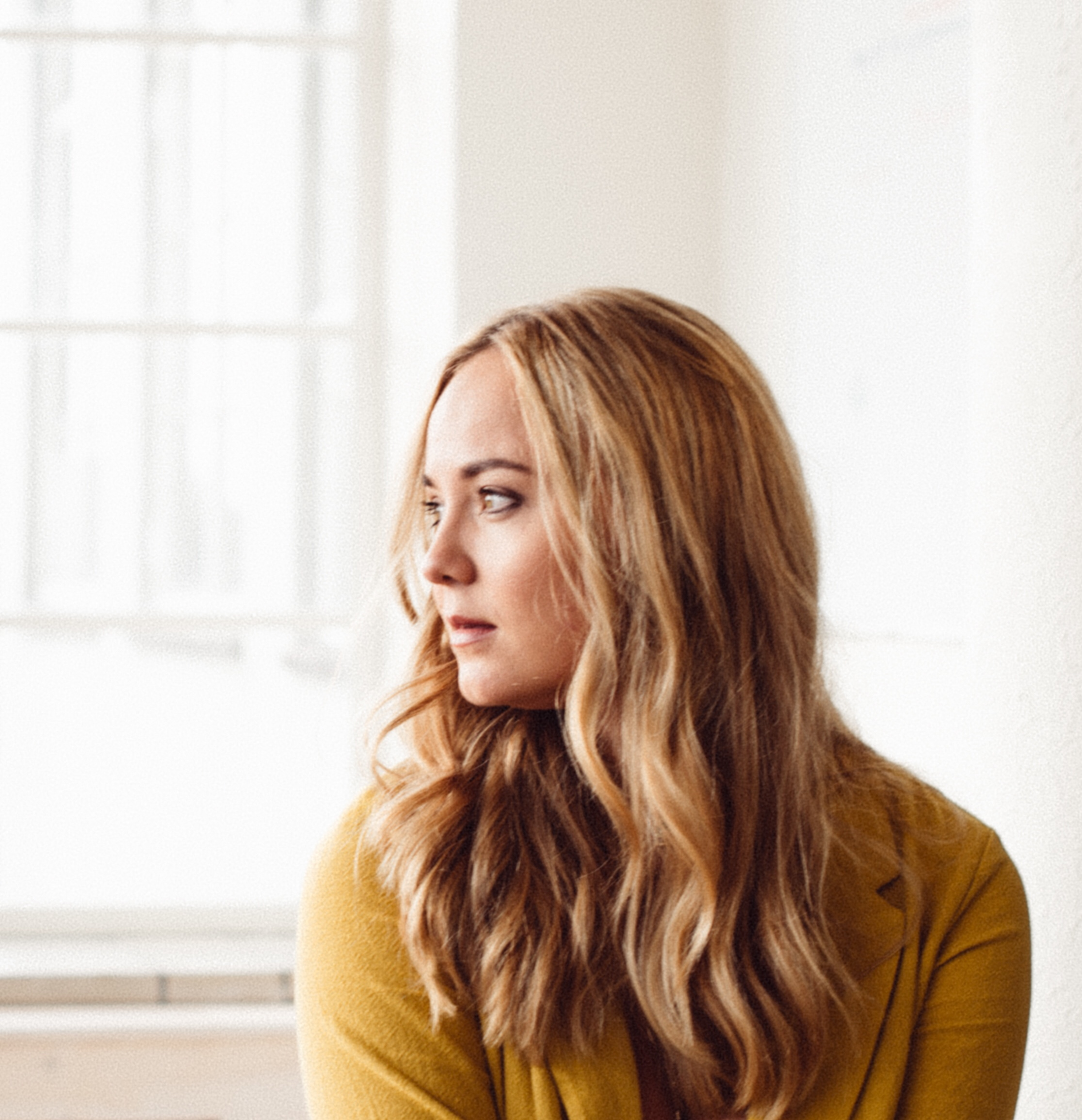
- Jantine Heij

Background information
- Born: September 21, 1990 (age 34)
- Origin: The Netherlands
- Occupation(s): Songwriter, vocalist, keyboardist and producer
- Labels: Spinnin' Records

Jantine Annika Heij (born September 21, 1990) is a songwriter, vocalist, keyboardist and producer from the Netherlands.

== Early life ==
She graduated with honours from Codarts University of the Arts in 2012.

== Career ==
She has worked with Skrillex, Hardwell, Exo, NCT 127, Monsta X, Rock Mafia and released songs on Spinnin' Records, Universal Music Group, SM Entertainment and more.

== Recognition ==
Jantine received a platinum award and a 2017 Buma Award for co-writing All Night Long, performed by Dutch artist Rochelle.

She reached a Billboard Album Chart no. 1 position with NCT 127's second mini album Limitless, which debuted at a no.1 position in the South-Korean Gaon Album Chart. Limitless exceeded 120,000 physical sales.

More Billboard Album Chart success was obtained with Luna's debut album, Free Somebody.

== Discography ==
Year	Artist	Title	Credit
2019	Swanky Tunes featuring Jantine	I'll Live On	Vocalist
2018	Paul Mayson	Ain't Got Love	Writer, vocalist
2018	Catali featuring iAm	Cheating On Me	Writer
2018	Key	Chemicals	Writer
2018	Dante Klein and Jantine	What I Like About U	Writer, vocalist, producer
2018	Rochelle	Make It Better, No God, Man On The Run	Writer
2018	Rochelle and Maydien	Come & Get It	Writer, producer
2018	Hardwell and Dr Phunk featuring Jantine	Take Us Down (Feeding Our Hunger)	Writer, vocalist, producer
2018	Paul Elstak featuring Jantine	Demons	Writer, vocalist, producer
2018	Frontliner featuring Jantine	Follow You	Writer, vocalist, producer
2018	Lowriderz	Hold On Me	Writer
2017	LNY TNZ featuring Jantine	Set You Free	Writer, vocalist, producer
2017	NCT 127	Heartbreaker (롤러코스터)	Writer
2017	Dirtcaps featuring Jantine	Need A Friend	Writer, vocalist, producer
2017	Vicky-T	Turn It Low, Ghost, Touch	Writer
2017	Gold/Shade featuring Jantine	Empty	Writer, vocalist, producer
2017	Maya Payne	Something We Once Knew	Writer
2017	Jebroer, Paul Elstak, Dr Phunk	Engeltje	Vocalist
2017	Manse featuring Jantine	Time Of Our Lives	Writer, vocalist
2016	Rochelle	All Night Long	Writer
2016	Luna	Breathe	Writer
2016	LNY TNZ	Burn It Down	Writer, vocalist, producer
2016	Julian Jordan featuring Ruby Prophet	A Thousand Miles	Writer, producer
2016	Yves V and Sem Thomasson featuring Ruby Prophet	On Top Of The World	Writer, producer
2016	The Him featuring Gia Koka	Don't Leave Without Me	Writer
2016	Parov Stelar and AronChupa	Grandpa's Groove	Writer
2015	Lush and Simon	The Universe	Writer
2015	Dirtcaps featuring Rochelle	Fools Paradise	Writer, producer
2015	Firebeatz and DubVision featuring Ruby Prophet	Invincible	Writer, producer
2015	DubVision	Vertigo	Writer, producer
2015	Dash Berlin and Syzz	This Is Who We Are	Writer
2020	No mana	Strangers	Writer, vocalist
