= Joohoney =

South Korean rapper (born 1994)

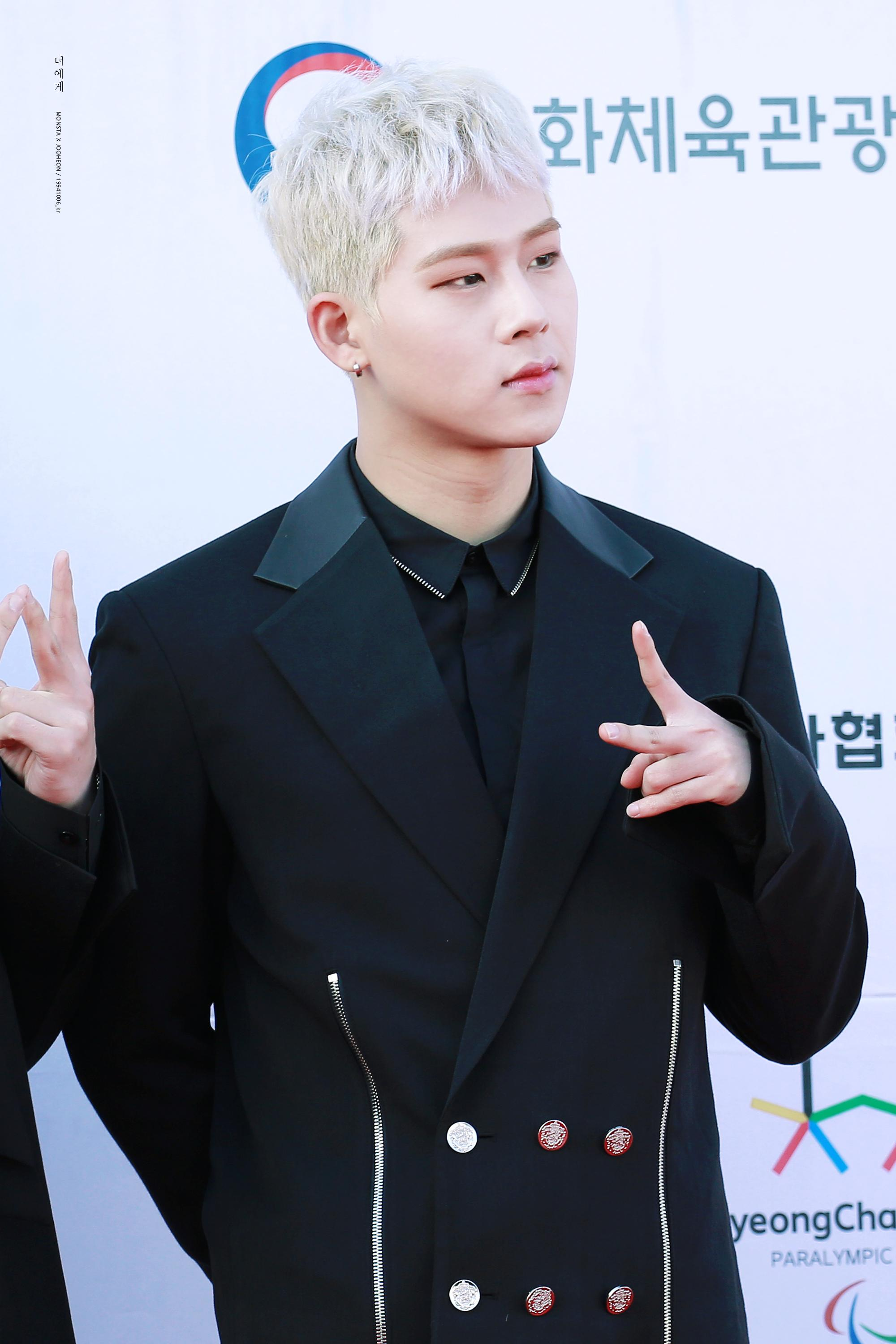
- Joohoney in November 2017
- Born: Lee Ji-hwan; October 6, 1994 (age 32); Seoul, South Korea
- Occupations: Rapper; singer; songwriter; producer
- Musical career
- Genres: K-pop; hip hop
- Instruments: Vocals; drums; piano; synthesizer
- Years active: 2015–present
- Label: Starship
- Member of: Monsta X; NoArk Crew

Korean name
- Hangul: 이주헌
- RR: I Juheon
- MR: I Chuhŏn

Former name
- Hangul: 이지환
- RR: I Jihwan
- MR: I Chihwan

Signature
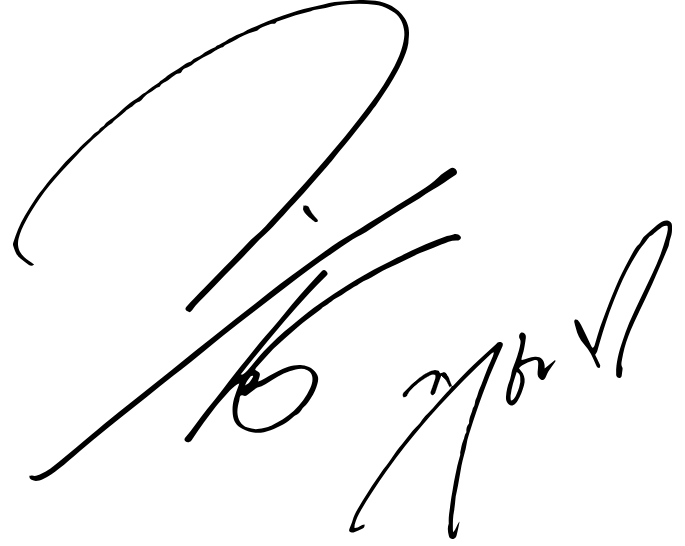

Lee Joo-heon (Korean: 이주헌; born October 6, 1994), better known by the stage name Joohoney and formerly mononymously known as Jooheon, is a South Korean rapper, singer, songwriter, and producer. He is a member of the South Korean boy group Monsta X under Starship Entertainment. He made his solo debut with the EP Lights in 2023.

== Career ==
=== 2014: Debut and career beginnings ===
Prior to his debut with Monsta X, Joohoney was part of a project group called Nu Boyz, with #Gun, Shownu, and Wonho, formed under Starship Entertainment in August 2014. The quartet uploaded multiple mixtapes on their company's YouTube channel and performed at the opening show of Starship X concert in December 2014.

In December 2014, Starship Entertainment and Mnet launched a survival program named No.Mercy and Joohoney was selected, along with six other participants (including Shownu and Wonho), as part of the new boy group Monsta X on the last episode of the show.

=== 2015–2016: Show Me the Money 4 and Tribe of Hip Hop ===
In January 2015, Joohoney was featured in the collaboration track "Coach Me", with San E and Sistar's Hyolyn. Joohoney alongside group member Kihyun, participated in the soundtrack of the South Korean drama Orange Marmalade titled "Attractable Woman", which was released in May 2015, and produced by Crazy Park and his team.

In June, Joohoney auditioned for the fourth season of Mnet's rap competition show Show Me the Money. He was eliminated in the third round in a 1-on-1 battle against rapper Lee Hyun-joon, but was later brought back for a second chance where he lost to One.

In April 2016, Joohoney was one of the producers for JTBC's hip-hop competition show Tribe of Hip Hop, appearing as the youngest producer on the show.

=== 2017–present: Mixtape releases and other solo activities ===
In January 2017, Joohoney released a solo music video for the song "Rhythm".

In August 2018, Joohoney released his mixtape DWTD. For the release, he released a music video for the track "Red Carpet", then a few months later, in October, he released a second MV, this time for the track "Should I Do". It charted in several countries, including ranking at number eight and twenty-two on the weekly Billboard's World Album and Top Heatseekers Album charts, respectively.

In February 2019, he changed to the stage name Joohoney, from using his given name Jooheon, for English-language activities.

In June, Joohoney appeared on Produce X 101 as a battle rap trainer for the contestants' first elimination battle.

In January 2020, Joohoney took a temporary break from Monsta X in order to focus on his mental health. He continued promotions again in late March, prior to the release of their Korean EP Fantasia X.

On October 9, Joohoney released his mixtape Psyche. He also pre-released the music video for the track "Intro: Ambition" on October 7, and then released the music video for "Smoky" simultaneous to the release of the mixtape. "Smoky" was described by Daniel Waters of MTV as an "emo-k-pop crossover", with Teen Vogue describing the chorus as "a sort of angsty rock 'n roll anthem" that both described as "cathartic". On October 21, Joohoney released a music video for the title track "Psyche".

In December 2020, Joohoney collaborated with Lovelyz's Kei on the OST "Ride or Die" for the drama Run On. The song was released on December 23.

In May 2021, Joohoney featured on the remake of the song "If You Love Me" by NS Yoon-G, originally released in 2012 with a feature by Jay Park.

On August 5, MBC's Idol Radio announced its second season, with Joohoney as a DJ for the show, alongside group member Hyungwon. The first episode aired on August 9, with the show streaming weekly through Universe and airing on MBC Radio.

In September, Joohoney appeared on the MU:PLY's Muziekwang Company as Kikwang's manager. It was a mockumentary web program that follows their journey as they open their own music agency. Muzie plays the company's CEO and top producer, while Kikwang plays a solo artist signed to the label.

In December, Joohoney appeared as one of the special judges in the Mnet's dance survival program Street Dance Girls Fighter's fourth mission, with group members Hyungwon and I.M, for Monsta X's B-side song "Autobahn".

In April 2022, Joohoney tested positive for COVID-19.

On October 14, Joohoney attended the 2023 S/S Seoul Fashion Week's Beyond Closet show, organized by fashion designer Ko Tae-yong, held at Dongdaemun Design Plaza (DDP) in Seoul. On October 20, he also performed for MBC's Idol Radio's first overseas concert Idol Radio Live in Tokyo, alongside group member Hyungwon and Got7's Youngjae, with several other artists, held at Tokyo Garden Theater in Tokyo.

On November 21, Starship Entertainment confirmed that Joohoney will make his acting debut through the Netflix original film K-pop: Lost in America, which revolves around the story of a Korean boy group that heads in New York for debut but ends up stranded in Texas with no money and mobile phones, and to be helmed by the famous Korean film director Yoon Je-kyoon who directed Haeundae and The Negotiation, with filming in the U.S. starting from March to June 2023.

In January 2023, Joohoney was featured in a pictorial and an interview for the February issue of Cosmopolitan Korea. On January 20, he was selected to be a member of channel DdeunDdeun's new web entertainment show Bbam Bbam Social Club at YouTube, a program where each person drinks, talks, and interacts with each other, alongside Joo Woo-jae, The Boyz's Sunwoo, Aiki, Lee Yong-joo, and Park Se-mi.

Starting in late February, Joohoney will be a permanent MC of Mnet's M Countdown, alongside (G)I-dle's Miyeon, as a replacement to Nam Yoon-su. The same month, he and I.M had a pictorial and an interview with the fashion and lifestyle magazine Vogue Korea.

In March, Joohoney will be part of JTBC's new variety show Korean Food Tray, a program that flies with Korean food trays anywhere in the world and makes Korean meal, alongside Chef Lee Yeon-bok and Hong Jin-kyung.

On April 16, he participated in the OST of TVING's original Our Game: LG Twins, titled "Awake", with Kihyun. It is a song about overcoming difficulties by cheering each other on and raising hope, which combines rock and hip hop, and contains a moving theme of turning adversity upside down. They also participated in the pitch and theta for victory before the game series against Doosan Bears.

On May 22, Joohoney released his solo debut extended play Lights, with the lead single "Freedom".

On June 5, he released the promotional single "Mountain Over the Mountain", alongside Dynamic Duo's Gaeko and Big Naughty, as part of the "2023 Mountain Dew Campaign". On June 28, Joohoney attended the Chanel's "Codes Couleur" pop-up store opening, held in Seongdong District, Seoul.

In August, he was announced as part of the OST lineup for JTBC's new Saturday and Sunday drama Behind Your Touch, titled "Hip Hop", which was released on August 13.

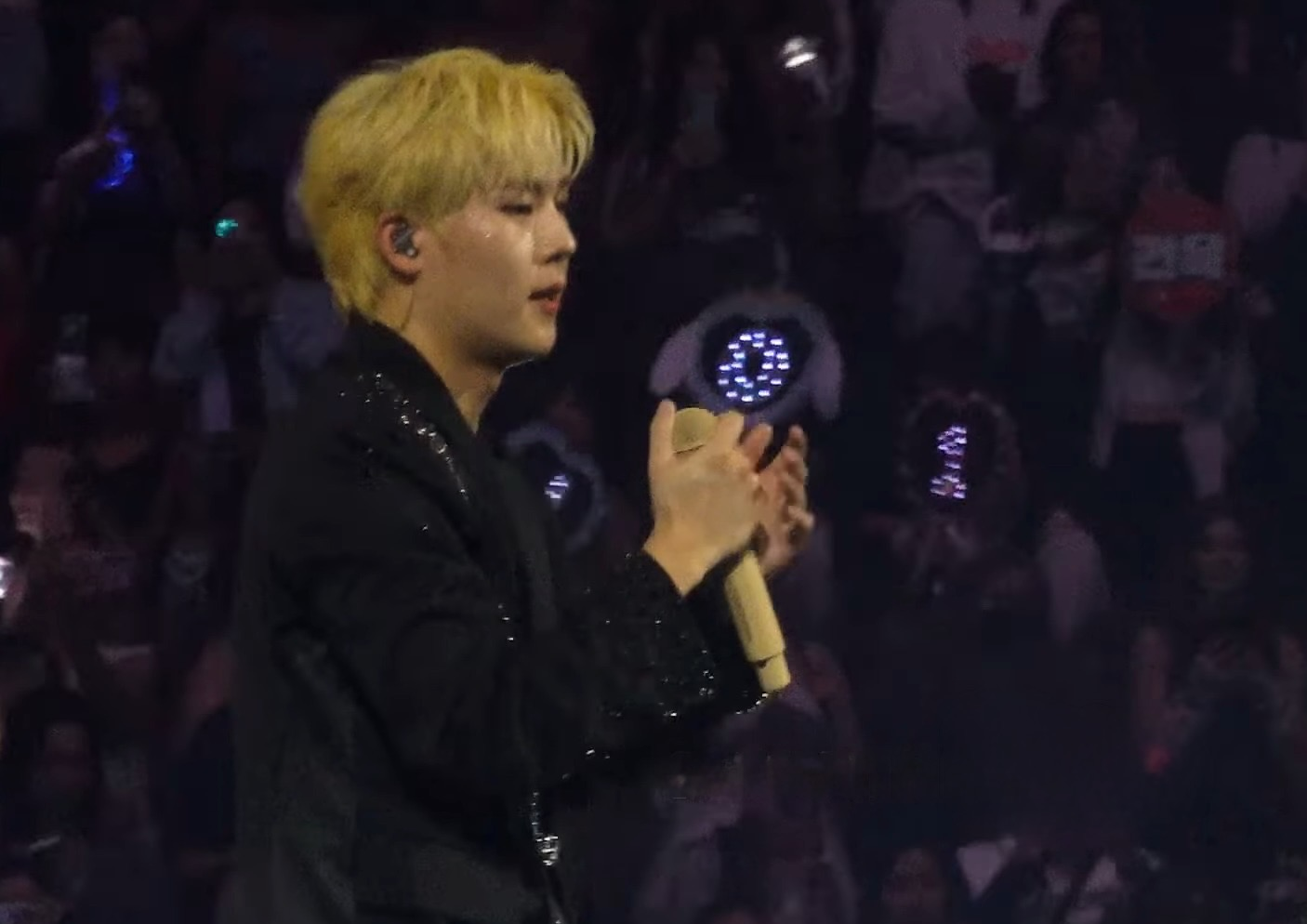
Joohoney at KCON LA in 2025

In February 2025, Joohoney held a free fan event after his military discharge.

On May 18, he performed at the music festival SuperPop Korea 2025, held at KINTEX in Gyeonggi Province, Seoul.

On December 17, Starship Entertainment announced that Joohoney will release a solo album in early January 2026. On December 18, it was revealed to be his second extended play 光 (Insanity), with the lead single "Sting", featuring Muhammad Ali, which will be released on January 5, 2026. On December 22, his single "Push", featuring Ive's Rei, was pre-released.

In April, he opened his own YouTube channel. On June 20, Joohoney performed at the music festival Rapbeat 2026, held at Culture Depot in Mapo-gu, Seoul. He was also announced as one of the panelists for the Netflix reality show Dating Lab. Joohoney was featured in Baby Shark Boy's debut lead single "Wave", from the digital single album of the same name, which was released on August 20. In September, it was announced that he will be part of tvN's television program Just a Friend, directed by Na Yeong-seok.

== Personal life ==
=== Military service ===
Joohoney enlisted for his mandatory military service as an active duty soldier, with 15th Infantry Division at Hwacheon army base in North Gangwon Province on July 24, 2023. During his basic military training, he took the role of a company commander in the 2nd company. Joohoney served as an assistant drill instructor and military chaplain, while he was promoted to corporal early in March 2024, for his exemplary military career. Joohoney was officially discharged on January 23, 2025. It was also revealed during his fan event that he became a disciplinary squad leader and received the "Elite 300" commendation due to his exemplary military performance.

== Public image and impact ==
Joohoney is known as an "all-rounder artist" with talents in vocals, rap, and music producing. He has produced songs for Monsta X since their debut and also had been nominated in one of the leading U.S. music awards ceremonies. Joohoney is also known for his "aegyo" and "anti-war charm", and has expanded his activities in various fields, from being a DJ to a model for clothing brands.

According to SPAO's official, its flagship product sold 500,000 pieces in 2021, increasing from 170,000 pieces of the previous year since he started modelling for the said product. According to Born Champs' CEO Bae Sang-in, there is a significant increase in sales thanks to strengthening marketing including the selection of Monsta X's Joohoney as the brand model. Beginning with 2022 S/S season, the brand, which he had presented, is expected to increase its performance by 30-40% compared to the previous year. Its winter collection, a new collection released on his birthday, became number one in Musinsa.

Joohoney was consistently placed in Tumblr's "Most Popular K-pop Stars", ranking 37th in 2018, 38th in 2019, 54th in 2020, 79th in 2021, and 92nd in 2022. He was also consistently ranked in the "Individual Boy Group Members Brand Power Ranking" published by the Korean Corporate Reputation Research Institute, with the highest ranking at 17th in June 2020.

Joohoney started producing and working on external songs, for then labelmate Boyfriend's lead single "Star", from the group's fifth EP Never End, and several songs for Mad Clown. He featured and produced the single "Ongsimi", for fellow group member Minhyuk. Joohoney composed, wrote, and arranged the song "Jumper", for his labelmate Cravity, from the group's debut EP Season 1. Hideout: Remember Who We Are, and the song "Underdog", from the group's third studio album Dare to Crave. He produced the single "Turning Point", for JTBC's reality competition show Peak Time's final round, with DKB performing the song, which accelerated the group's popularity. The song "Beastmode" which Joohoney produced, from Monsta X's third studio album Fatal Love, became the ending theme song of the South Korean animated film Exorcism Chronicles: The Beginning.

== Other ventures ==
=== Endorsements ===
In July 2021, Joohoney had been selected as an exclusive model of the Korean fashion brand SPAO's F/W season, in collaboration with the Korean brands and customers' lifestyle platform Musinsa.

In February 2022, he became one of the faces of the Korean cosmetics and skincare brand Olive Young's Vegan Beauty campaign, with his group member Minhyuk and labelmate Ive's Liz. In March, Joohoney became the new face of the Korean street casual brand Born Champs, unveiling its 2022 spring collection through SNS.

In January 2023, he participated in the carbonated soft drink brand Mountain Dew's campaign, as part of its collaboration with Starship Entertainment, together with Dynamic Duo's Gaeko and Big Naughty.

In February 2026, Joohoney had been selected as a brand model of the Korean skincare brand Silcus, under the theme of "The Veil of Silk on the Skin".

=== Philanthropy ===
In October 2021, Joohoney donated ₩500,000 through the idol fandom community service My Favorite Idol, on the occasion of his birthday on October 6. It will be delivered to the Miral Welfare Foundation and used as a fund for the disabled who are isolated due to COVID-19. He appeared on the cover of the Korean Beauty Magazine's November issue, published by Public News that also spreads Hallyu culture to the world and introduces fashion, beauty, and life that Koreans love, with all the proceeds from its sales be donated to the Korea Social Contribution Association and 100% will be used for the development of Hallyu culture and the underprivileged.

== Discography ==
=== Extended plays ===
List of extended plays, with selected details, chart positions and sales
Title	Details	Peak chart positions	Sales
Title	Details	KOR	Sales
Lights	Released: May 22, 2023; Label: Starship Entertainment; Formats: CD, digital download, streaming audio	6	KOR: 80,131
光 (Insanity)	Released: January 5, 2026; Label: Starship Entertainment; Formats: CD, digital download, streaming audio	6	KOR: 31,920

=== Mixtapes ===
List of mixtapes, with selected details, chart positions and tracklists
Title	Details	Peak chart positions		Tracklist
Title	Details	US Heat.	US World	Tracklist
SUPEXX	Released: July 10, 2015; Label: Starship Entertainment; Formats: Digital download, streaming audio	—	—	1. "Get Low" feat. Mad Clown; 2. "Stay Strong" feat. Flowsik
Flower Cafe	Released: November 11, 2015; Label: Starship Entertainment; Formats: Digital download, streaming audio	—	—	1. "Flower Cafe" feat. I.M & Sam Ock
Out of Control	Released: January 17, 2017; Label: Starship Entertainment; Formats: Digital download, streaming audio	—	—	1. "Rhythm"; 2. "OMG (Yellow Lambo)"
DWTD	Released: August 31, 2018; Label: Starship Entertainment; Formats: Digital download, streaming audio	22	8	1. "Red Carpet" (Prod. 9F); 2. "Should I do" (Prod. Boycold); 3. "Kang Baek-ho" (Prod. Ye-Yo!); 4. "Runway" feat. Killagramz (Prod. Dakshood); 5. "Manito" (Prod. Ye-Yo!)
Psyche	Released: October 9, 2020; Label: Starship Entertainment; Formats: Digital download, streaming audio	—	—	1. "Intro: Ambition"; 2. "Psyche"; 3. "DIA"; 4. "Smoky"; 5. "Dark & Cloudy" feat. Kim Boa; 6. "King"; 7. "Wingsuit" feat. Tem
"—" denotes releases that did not chart or were not released in that region.

=== Singles ===
==== As lead artist ====
List of singles, showing year released, chart positions and album name
Title	Year	Peak chart positions	Album
Title	Year	KOR	Album
"Interstellar" (with Hyungwon and I.M feat. Yella Diamond)	2015	—	Trespass
"Freedom"	2023	105	Lights
"Push" (featuring Rei)	2025	— (Note: "Push" did not enter on the Circle Digital Chart but appeared at number 42 on the component Download Chart.)	光 (Insanity)
"Sting" (featuring Muhammad Ali)	2026	— (Note: "Sting" did not enter on the Circle Digital Chart but appeared at number 18 on the component Download Chart.)	光 (Insanity)
"—" denotes releases that did not chart or were not released in that region.

==== As featured artist ====
List of singles as featured artist, showing year released, chart positions, sales and album name
Title	Year	Peak chart positions	Sales	Album
Title	Year	KOR	Sales	Album
"Ganggab" (깽값) (Mad Clown feat. Jooheon)	2014	67	KOR: 66,904	Ferocity (표독)
"Coach Me" (Hyolyn and San E feat. Jooheon)	2015	16	KOR: 172,850	No.Mercy OST Part 1
"0 (Young)" (Jooyoung, Mad Clown, and Giriboy feat. No.Mercy contestants)	2015	71	KOR: 43,760	No.Mercy OST Part 3
"Bad X" (J'Kyun and Konsoul feat. Jooheon)	2015	—	Undisclosed	Non-album single
"H.ear Your Colors" (Mad Clown feat. Jooheon)	2016	57	KOR: 42,946	Non-album single
"Slow" (Hyolyn feat. Jooheon)	2016	—	Undisclosed	It's Me
"BAM!BAM!BAM!" (DJ H.ONE and Justin Oh feat. Jooheon)	2017	—	Undisclosed	Non-album single
"1(One)" (DJ H.ONE feat. Jooheon and Kriz)	2017	—	Undisclosed	Mix and the City OST Part 2
"Ongsimi" (옹심이) (Minhyuk feat. Joohoney)	2019	—	Undisclosed	Non-album single
"If You Love Me" (NS Yoon-G feat. Joohoney)	2021	64	Undisclosed	Non-album single
"Wave" (Baby Shark Boy feat. Joohoney)	2026	TBA	Undisclosed	Wave
"—" denotes releases that did not chart or were not released in that region.

==== Collaborative singles ====
List of collaborative singles, showing year released, chart positions, sales and album name
Title	Year	Peak chart positions	Sales	Album
Title	Year	KOR	Sales	Album
"Get Low" (털어) (with Mad Clown)	2015	65	KOR: 74,428	Non-album single

==== Promotional singles ====
List of promotional singles, showing year released, chart positions and album name
Title	Year	Peak chart positions	Album
Title	Year	KOR	Album
"Mountain Over the Mountain" (Prod. dress) (Note: "Mountain Over the Mountain" will be released as a promotional single in collaboration with Mountain Dew.) (with Gaeko and Big Naughty)	2023	— (Note: "Mountain Over the Mountain" did not enter on the Circle Digital Chart but appeared at number 141 on the component Download Chart.)	Non-album single
"—" denotes releases that did not chart or were not released in that region.

=== Soundtrack appearances ===
Title	Year	Album	Artist(s)	Ref.
"Attracted Woman"	2015	Orange Marmalade OST Part 2	Jooheon and Kihyun	
"Similar"	2015	Mask OST Part 7	Jooheon and Junggigo	
"Can't Breathe"	2018	Investigation Couple OST Part 1	Jooheon and Kihyun	
"Ride or Die"	2020	Run On OST Part 2	Joohoney and Kei	
"Awake"	2023	Our Game: LG Twins OST	Joohoney and Kihyun	
"Hip Hop"	2023	Behind Your Touch OST Part 1	Joohoney	

=== Other appearances ===
Title	Year	Album	Artist(s)	Ref.
"Shall We Dance"	2016	Tribe of Hip Hop OST	Jooheon, Kim Boa, and DinDin	
"Fire Moth" (이미쉘)	2016	Tribe of Hip Hop OST	Jooheon and Michelle Lee	
"Game of Thrones - 12 Producers"	2016	Tribe of Hip Hop OST	Jooheon, SeSeSe House, Hot Chicks House, Brand New House, and HI-Lite House	
"Be My Friend"	2017	Non-album single	Jooheon and I.M	

=== Music videos ===
Title	Year	Artist	Director	Ref.
"Red Carpet"	2018	Jooheon	Choi Young-ji (PinkLabel Visual)	
"Should I do"	2018	Jooheon	Ink	
"Intro: Ambition"	2020	Joohoney	Vishop (Vikings League)	
"Smoky"	2020	Joohoney	Highqualityfish	
"Psyche"	2020	Joohoney	Vishop (Vikings League)	
"Freedom"	2023	Joohoney	Jinooya Makes	
"Push"	2025	Joohoney (feat. Rei)	Yuk Heon-ryoung (KiNDa)	
"Sting"	2026	Joohoney (feat. Muhammad Ali)	Jun Gi-seong (ES4X)	

== Filmography ==
=== Film ===
Year	Title	Role	Note	Ref.
TBA	K-pop: Lost in America	TBA	Netflix film	

=== Television shows ===
Year	Show	Role	Note	Ref.
2014–2015	No.Mercy	Contestant	1st member announced as part of Monsta X	
2015	Show Me the Money 4	Contestant	until Rap Battle and Revival Round	
2016	Celebrity Bromance	Cast	with Jackson	
2016	Tribe of Hip Hop	Producer	as part of the SeSeSe House	
2016	Weekly Idol	MC	with Jackson, SinB, and Dahyun	
2019	Produce X 101	Battle Rap Trainer	appeared on Group X Battle (Episode 4)	
2020	King of Mask Singer	Contestant	as "It's the Best!" (Episode 257)	
2021	Street Dance Girls Fighter	Special Judge	with Hyungwon and I.M	
2022	Fantastic Family	Judge	with Minhyuk, YooA, and Seunghee	
2023	Show! Music Core	Special MC	with Minhyuk	
2023	M Countdown	MC	with Miyeon	
2023	Korean Food Tray	Cast	with Lee Yeon-bok, Hong Jin-kyung, Heo Kyung-hwan, and Nam Chang-hee	
2023	Peak Time	Producer	for DKB performing "Turning Point"	
2023	Stars' Top Recipe at Fun-Staurant	Special MC	with Lee Chae-min and Hyojung	
2023	Neighborhood Cool House	Special MC	Yoo Jeong-soo Cafe (Episode 1–2)	
2025	Mnet 30th Chart Show	MC	with Miyeon, Shuhua, Leeteuk, and Sung Han-bin (MAMA Awards BTS)	
2025	Stars' Top Recipe at Fun-Staurant	Competing Chef	with Shownu (Episode 271–273)	
2026	Just a Friend	Cast	with Jeongyeon, Lee Seo-jin, and Han Ji-min	

=== Radio shows ===
Year	Title	Role	Note	Ref.
2021–2022	Idol Radio	DJ	with Hyungwon for Season 2	
2022	Idol Radio	DJ	Season 2 (Special Edition)	

=== Web shows ===
Year	Title	Role	Note	Ref.
2021	Muziekwang Company	Cast	with Muzie, Gikwang, Jung Yeon-joo, Chuu, and Hyeongjun	
2022	X: New World	Cast	Season 2	
2022	Daejjok Counseling Center	MC	with Park Myung-soo	
2023	Bbam Bbam Social Club	Cast	with Joo Woo-jae, Sunwoo, Aiki, Lee Yong-joo, and Park Se-mi	
2025	Club Dinner	MC	Season 1	
2025	Debut's Plan	Special Trainer and MC	Episode 7–9	
2025–2026	Shimchungy: Good Errand Service	MC	Season 1	
2026	Dating Lab	Panelist	with Charles Enter	

=== Music video appearances ===
Year	Title	Artist	Note	Ref.
2012	"Joma Joma"	C-REAL	as Lee Joo-heon	

== Awards and nominations ==
Name of the award ceremony, year presented, category, recipient of the award and the result of the nomination
Award ceremony	Year	Category	Recipient	Result	Ref.
KBS Entertainment Awards	2025	Digital Content Award (Note: Shared with the whole cast.)	Idol 1N2D	Won	

== See also ==
- List of K-pop on the Billboard charts
