= List of sketches in Gag Concert =

This list contains previous sketches in the South Korean television show Gag Concert (Korean: 개그콘서트).

== Previous skits ==
※ Alphabetical order. The dates are according to the airing time on the original channel "KBS 2TV".

- "ㆍㆍㆍㆍㆍㆍ" (26 May 2013 – 13 October 2013)

(Korean: "... ...", pronounced 점점점 점점점 (jeomjeomjeom jeomjeomjeom); Starring: Namgung Kyeong-ho, Kim Hui-won, Song Pil-geun, Yoo Min-sang)

Featuring the awkwardness between a father and his daughter's boyfriend (future son-in-law).

- 1 vs. 1 (7 February 2016 – 7 May 2017)

(Korean: 1대1; Starring: Yoo Min-sang, Jeong Yoon-ho, Jeong Hae-cheol, Lee Se-jin, Kim Tae-won, Seo Tae-hun → Lee Chang-ho | Previous Appearances: Kim Seong-won, Kim Won-hun, Lee Sang-hun)

Parody of KBS quiz show 1 vs 100. The unique contestants frustrate the show host Yoo Min-sang.

- 10 Second Theatre (22 August 2004 – 29 August 2004)

(Korean: 10초 극장; Starring: Hwang Hyeon-hui, Kim Dae-beom)

- 10 Years Later (5 October 2014 – 22 March 2015)

(Korean: 10년 후; Starring: Heo An-na, Jeong Yoon-ho, Oh Gi-hwan, Kim Hyeon-gi, Kwon Jae-kwan | Semi-fixed cast: Jo Seung-hui, Kim Ji-ho | Previous Appearances: Im Woo-il)

A loan shark tries to bully the proprietress of a small business into paying back a loan, after turning up at her store every day for ten years, he becomes part of her and her son's lives. On 21 December 2014, Lee Ain appeared as a guest for Christmas special. On 22 February 2015, Kim Minseok and Kim Gun-mo appeared as guests. On 8 March 2015, Im Woo-il, the security guard from Stubborn skit, who used to work under Kwon Jae-kwan appeared in the corner.

- 301 302 (1 November 2015 – 20 March 2016)

(Korean: 301 302; Starring: Kim Minkyeong, Jeong Seunghwan, Jeong Jimin)

Two neighbours who think about each other and are pushed together by their landlord.

- A Bitter Life (22 March 2009 – 21 March 2010)

(Korean: 씁쓸한 인생; Starring: Kim Junho → Kim Daehui, Yu Sangmoo → Kim Junhyeon, Lee Sangho, Lee Sangmin, Lee Seungyun)

The title is based on the Korean film A Bittersweet Life; the skit is about a boss who suffers from his subordinates. This skit tied in with Kim Junho's 2009 gambling scandal, which cost him his television appearances and he had to lie low for a year. In Gag Concert's 700th episode special, Lee Munjae took over Yu Sangmu's role, and Kim Yeongcheol appeared as a special guest along with The Yellow Sea's scammers. On 28 May 2017, the skit returned for the Gag Concert 900th Episode Special (Part 1).

- Attractive Comedy (9 March 2003 – 29 September 2003)

(Korean: 유치개그; Starring: Jeong Hyeongdon, Kim Jihye, Kim Kisu, Kim Daehui)

- A Fairy Tale for Adults (30 March 2014 – 25 May 2014)

(Korean: 어른들을 위한 동화; Starring: Kim Kyeong-ah, Lee Dongyun, Heo Min, Jeong Beomgyun, Lee Sangho)

Retelling of Korean fairy tales to a modern adult audience.

List of Fairy Tales
1. 30 March 2014 – The Sun and the Moon | Kim Jimin
2. 6 April 2014 – Seoul Mouse and Country Mouse | Kim Kiri
3. 13 April 2014 – Heungbu and Nolbu | Kim Junhyun, Lee Sanghun
4. 25 May 2014 – Kongjwi and Patjwi | Kim Daeseong, Bok Hyeonkyu
- Abnormal Prison (28 September 2014 – 12 October 2014)

(Korean: 비정상 교도소; Starring: Im Jaebaek, Song Wangho, Kim Jeonghun, Seo Taehun, Kim Jiho, Lee Wongu, Kim Seongwon)

ِA portrayal of what convicts do in their hour of free time.

- Acting Idols (8 January 2017 – 12 November 2017)

(Korean: 연기돌; Starring: Oh Nami, Kim Daeseong → Seo Taehun, Lee Suji, Im Seonguk, Kim Hoekyeong, Lee Sejin)

An audition for a drama takes place and it attracts unique actors and actresses. On 21 May 2017, actor Kim Eung-soo appeared as a guest for the Gag Concert 900th Episode Special (Part 2).

- Affectionate Man's Rights Committee (13 September 2009 – 5 September 2010)

(Korean: 남성인권보장위원회; Starring: Hwang Hyeonhui, Choi Hyojong, Park Seongho)

- Amen to That (9 March 2002 – 30 March 2003)

(Korean: 그렇습니다; Starring: Park Junhyeong, Im Hyeokpil)

- Angels (8 September 2013 – 27 October 2013)

(Korean: 엔젤스; Starring: Jang Yuhwan, Kim Jincheol, Lee Hyeseok, Eom Taegyeong, Kim Jongeun, Kim Minkyeong, Ahn Somi, Hong Yeseul)

Funny portrayal of South Korea's idol fan culture.

- Angry Bosses (4 December 2016 – 2 July 2017)

(Korean: 불상사; Starring: Park Yeongjin, Jeong Seunghwan → Park Soyeong, Kim Taewon, Song Wangho → Shin Yunseung, Im Jaebaek, Im Seonguk)

About the newbie's first day at work where he meets his dysfunctional bosses. On 21 May 2017, actor Namgoong Min appeared as a guest for the Gag Concert 900th Episode Special (Part 2), acting as his character in KBS drama Good Manager.

- Animal Kingdom (3 August 2003 – 10 August 2003)

(Korean: 동물의 왕국; Starring: Park Junhyeong, Oh Jiheon, Jeong Jongcheol, Jo Suwon)

- Appendix of the Joseon Dynasty (2 December 2007 – 7 September 2008)

(Korean: 조선왕조부록; Starring: Park Jiseon, Kim Junhyeon, Yang Seonil, Jo Yunho)

- Are You Afraid? (13 May 2012 – 21 October 2012)

(Korean: 무섭지 아니한가(家); Starring: Oh Nami, Heo Anna, Song Yeonggil, Seo Namyong, Kim Huiwon)

- Are You Human? (22 July 2018 -9 September)

(Korean: 니가 인간이니? Starring: Jo Jin-sae, Hong Hyeon-ho, Park Jin-ho)

- Atomic Pride (23 November 2014 – 11 October 2015)

(Korean: 핵존심; Starring: Kim Ki-yeol, Lee Sang-hun, Kim Hui-won, Jeong Hae-cheol, Ahn So-mi, Seo Tae-hun, Jeong Myeong-hun | Previous Appearances: Yang Seon-il, Jang Ki-yeong, Hong Hwon, Choi Jae-won)

About men's pride which women hate. On 15 March 2015, models Oh Min-gi and Jo Seong-yeon appeared on the skit. On 24 May 2015, cheerleaders Geum Bo-a and Kim Yeon-jeong appeared in the skit. On 31 May 2015, Super Junior's Choi Siwon appeared in the skit. On 20 September 2015, CNBLUE along with the magician and actor Choi Hyeon-woo appeared as guests for Chuseok special.

- A-YO (9 May 2004 – 17 October 2004)

(Korean: A-YO; Starring: Oh Jiheon, Chae Gyeongseon, Kim Jincheol)

- Back in the Day (20 February 2011 – 2 October 2011)

(Korean: 그땐 그랬지; Starring: Lee Sangho, Lee Sangmin, Kim Jaewook, Jo Yunho, Kim Minkyeong, Ahn Somi)

About grandparents who tell their granddaughter stories to explain how life was different back in their days.

List of Stories
1. 20 February 2011 – Boyfriend ♥ Girlfriend.
2. 27 February 2011 – Couple picnic.
3. 20 March 2011 – New theme | Road trip | Coffee shop.
4. 27 March 2011 – Football | Sneaking out of school | Chinese restaurant | Street fighter.
5. 3 April 2011 – Shooting game | Car race.
6. 10 April 2011 – Magic | Mission impossible.
7. 17 April 2011 – Basketball | Amusement park | Super Mario.
8. 24 April 2011 – Chef | Tetromino.
9. 1 May 2011 – Daring Raccoon.
10. 8 May 2011 – Bubble Bobble | Terminator.
11. 15 May 2011 – Spy | Superman.
12. 22 May 2011 – Zoo | Kungfu panda | Talking twin babies | Find differences game.
13. 29 May 2011 – Food matching | Dodge Danpei.
14. 5 June 2011 – Beach | Antarctica | Dragon Ball.
15. 12 June 2011 – Army | Train | Shooting game | Superman.
16. 19 June 2011 – Arcade | Adventure Island.
17. 26 June 2011 – Amusement park | Cherry blossom festival | Star wars.
18. 10 July 2011 – Olympics | Canoe race | Angry birds | Iron man | Shrek.
19. 17 July 2011 – Haunted house | Arkanoid | Magic trick.
20. 24 July 2011 – Training to be a hero | Pinball | Flashman.
21. 31 July 2011 – Cleaning | Bubble game | Spiderman.
22. 7 August 2011 – Hospital | Circus Charlie | Escalator.
23. 14 August 2011 – Scientist | Copying machine | Tanks | Ninja | Cyborg.
24. 21 August 2011 – Movies | Hong Kong | Galaga.
25. 28 August 2011 – Volleyball | Washing machine | Computer.
26. 4 September 2011 – Jobs | Inspector Gadget.
27. 11 September 2011 – Baseball | Mission impossible.
28. 18 September 2011 – Beach | Martial arts training.
29. 25 September 2011 – Environment | Garden | Robocop.
30. 2 October 2011 – Music instruments | Subway | Bumblebee | Optimus | END.
- Bad Guys (15 May 2016 – 12 June 2016)

(Korean: 나쁜녀석들; Starring: Yoo Min-sang, Song Yeong-gil, Jeong Seung-hwan, Park Hwi-sun, Ahn So-mi | Previous appearances: Yang Sang-guk, Kim Na-hui)

Gangsters trying to show off how bad they are. On 12 June 2016, Yang Jeong-won appeared on the skit as a guest.

- Bad Mothers (22 March 2015 – 26 July 2015)

(Korean: 불량엄마; Starring: Jeong Jaehyeong → Kim Kiyeol, Heo Anna, Yu Inseok, Kim Yeonghui, Lee Hyeonjeong, Lee Sejin)

About three crazy mothers who are summoned to school because of their sons. Kim Kiyeol is the school counselor. Heo Anna, Yungi's mother, is a web broadcast host, BJ Heovely Mom, on 12 April 2015 the character was changed to be Kim Kiyeol's crazy crush from the past. Kim Yeonghui, Sangeun's mother, is an actress with Yu Inseok as her manager. Lee Hyeonjeong, Hyeoncheol's mother, is an inmate who is taking this opportunity to run away. On 26 July 2015, the actress Ye Ji-won appeared to promote her play.

- Badump Badump (16 June 2013 – 20 July 2014)

(Korean: 두근두근; Starring: Lee Munjae, Jang Hyoin, Park Soyeong)

Romantic corner about friends who are secretly in love, with the signature song The Cranberries's Ode to My Family whenever either one of them slips up regarding his/her feelings toward the other, before playing/shrugging it off in an attempt to appear nonchalant. The corner starts with SECRET's YooHoo.

- BalleriNO (16 January 2011 – 7 August 2011)

(Korean: 발레리NO; Starring: Jeong Taeho, Park Seongkwang, Lee Seungyun, Yang Seonil)

- Bayside Shakedown (19 September 2004 – 13 March 2005)

(Korean: 춤추는 대수사선; Starring: Park Seongho, Kim Daebeom, Ahn Sangtae, Hwang Hyeonhui)

Based on the Japanese police drama/comedy series of the same name.

- BB Channel (8 November 2009)

(Korean: BB 채널; Starring: Ahn Sangtae, Park Yeongjin, Park Seongkwang, Jang Doyeon)

- BBOOM Entertainment (7 July 2013 – 25 May 2014)

(Korean: 뿜 엔터테인먼트; Starring: Kim Wonhyo, Kim Jimin, Kim Minkyeong, Shin Bora, Yu Inseok → Jang Yunseok, Park Eunyeong, Kim Hyeseon, Kim Junho)

Portraying in a sarcastic manner, the daily life of an entertainment company, its stressed and annoyed CEO, and their troublesome talents afflicted by the so-called "celebrity disease".

- Be Mine (9 April 2017)

(Korean: 내꺼하자; Starring: Kim Kiyeol, Park Sora, Yang Seonil, Kwak Beom)

An investigation officer couple arrives at the victim's home to inspect for clues, but in reality they were checking out the house when they heard it is for sale.

- Beastly Idols (25 July 2010 – 21 November 2010)

(Korean: 짐승들; Starring: Lee Seungyun, Lee Sangmin, Lee Sangho, Heo Kyung-hwan)

Musical comedy; singing popular songs and showing physical strength as dance moves. A play on the term Beastly Idols (짐승돌) that is usually associated with 2PM.

List of Songs
1. 25 July 2010 – 2PM's Heartbeat
2. 1 August 2010 – 2PM's I Hate You
3. 8 August 20100 – U-KISS's Man Man Ha Ni
4. 15 August 2010 – B2ST's Shock
5. 22 August 2010 – SHINee's Ring Ding Dong
6. 29 August 2010 – 2PM's Again & Again
7. 5 September 2010 – BigBang's Last Farewell
8. 12 September 2010 – PSY's You in Vague Memory
9. 19 September 2010 – Buck's Barefooted Youth
10. 26 September 2010 – DJ DOC's I'm A Guy Like This
11. 3 October 2010 – Norazo's Superman
12. 10 October 2010 – DJ DOC's Run To You
13. 24 October 2010 – PSY's Champion
14. 31 October 2010 – JYP's Honey
15. 7 November 2010 – DJ DOC's Dance with DOC
16. 21 November 2010 – Sechs Kies's The Way This Guy Lives (PomSaeng PomSa)
- Beatbox (19 January 2003 – 30 March 2003)

(Korean: 비트박스; Starring: Park Junhyeong, Jeong Jongcheol, Kim Sideok, Kim Kisu)

- Beautiful Flowers (19 September 2004 – 13 February 2005)

(Korean: 꽃보다 아름다워; Starring: Jeong Jongcheol, Jeong Hyeongdon, Oh Jiheon, Kim Sideok)

- Beautiful Imprisonment (21 June 2015 – 6 September 2015)

(Korean: 아름다운 구속; Starring: Seo Taehun, Kim Daeseong, Kim Hoekyeong, Ryu Geunji, Song Jungeun)

About a detective who've trying to capture a criminal since a long time but they give off a romantic vibe as if it is a love story included "love triangle". On 26 July 2015, Song Jungeun joined the skit as the chief and has been acting like "in-laws".

- Beaver Brothers (2 September 2001 – 13 July 2003)

(Korean: 갈갈이 삼형제; Starring: Park Junhyeong, Jeong Jongcheol, Lee Seunghwan)

- Belly Button Stealer (2 March 2014 – 16 March 2014)

(Korean: 배꼽도둑; Starring: Kim Kiri, Lee Munjae, Lee Chan, Kwak Beom, Yun Hanmin, Park Yeongjin)

About a comedian who does not want to come back on "Gag Concert" being persuaded by his former colleagues, and even though he claims he has forgotten how to do comedy, he still has the comedic touch.

- Best Friends (29 July 2012 – 14 October 2012)

(Korean: 친한친구; Starring: Park Seongkwang, Kim Daeseong, Lee Dongyun, Jeong Haecheol)

- Big Dipper God Fist or Hokuto Shin Ken (2 April 2006 – 9 July 2006)

(Korean: 북두신권; Starring: Kim Daebeom, Kim Kiyeol, Shin Bongsun, Park Narae, Park Seongho)

- Black and White (16 November 2003 – 18 January 2004)

(Korean: 흑과백; Starring: Jeong Myeonghun, Seo Jiyeong, Choi Huiseon, Jang Ung)

- Black Snake (18 October 2015 – 29 November 2015)

(Korean: 블랙 스네이크; Starring: Song Byeongcheol, Seo Namyong, Lee Sanghun, Lee Sangeun)

On stage and in front of their fans, Black Snake is a devil worshipping death metal band. However, when backstage and in private the band members are quiet and unassuming, being deeply conflicted about the act they have to put on.

- Blaming Battle (4 June 2017 – 25 June 2017)

(Korean: 배틀 트집; Starring: Kim Kiyeol, Yang Seonil, Song Jungeun, Lee Sanghun, Ryu Geunil, Song Wangho, Jeong Haecheol, Park Sora)

Innocent Kim Kiyeol becomes the accused victim when during a press conference.

- Block and Kick (28 June 2015 – 2 August 2015)

(Korean: 막고 차고; Starring: Jeong Beomgyun, Kim Jiho, Jeong Taeho)

Lessons about defense by Block (Jeong Taeho) and Kick (Kim Jiho).

- Blushing Old Age (11 June 2017 – 8 October 2017)

(Korean: 볼빨간 회춘기; Starring: Yu Minsang, Song Yeonggil, Yang Seonil, Kim Hoekyeong, Shim Mungyu, Hong Seonghyeon)

Yang Seonil visits the new senior citizen center where he gets an induction by the older senior citizens around.

- Boys Over Flowers (15 February 2009 – 12 April 2009)

(Korean: 꽃보다남자; Starring: Noh Ujin, Park Hwi-sun, Heo Kyung-hwan, Park Jisun, Han Mingwan, Oh Nami)

Parody of the famous Korean drama of the same name. Guest-stars some of the actual actors from the drama.

- Bongsunga School (6 April 2008– 19 May 2019)

(Korean: 봉숭아 학당; Starring: See 봉숭아 학당)

A skit about a school full of unique and vibrant characters. On 21 May 2017, the skit returned for the Gag Concert 900th Episode Special (Part 2). The skit was revived on 2 July 2017 with a number of comedians returning to the Gag Concert stage.

- Brave Guys (12 February 2012 – 10 February 2013)

(Korean: 용감한 녀석들; Starring: Yang Seonil, Jeong Taeho, Shin Bora, Park Seongkwang, Park Eunyeong)

Musical comedy. Brave Guys became famous and well known in 2012; they recorded many songs and the skit took 2012's Top Excellence Award for ideas.

- Busking Again (17 December 2017 – 11 March 2018)

(Korean: 버스킹 어게인; Starring: Jang Giyeong, Kim Taewon, Im Seongwook, Lee Seunghwan, Jo Jinsae)

- Can't Take It Back (10 July 2016 – 12 February 2017)

(Korean: 빼박캔트; Starring: Kim Janggun, Park Sora, Kim Seunghye)

A man who has to stay extremely focused because of his girlfriend's trap questions and unforeseeable reactions.

- Can We Become Strangers? (3 September 2017 – 22 October 2017)

(Korean: 남이 될 수 있을까; Starring: Jang Yunseok, Park Sora, Im Jonghyeok, Kim Seunghye, Ryu Geunji)

- Captain Hwang (16 October 2005)

(Korean: 황대장; Starring: Hwang Hyeonhui, Yu Minsang, Yun Hyeongbin)

- Castle Gamsu (3 April 2011 – 16 September 2012)

(Korean: 감수성; Starring: Kim Junho, Kim Daehui, Kwon Jae-kwan, Lee Dongyun, Kim Yeongmin, Kim Jeonghun, Kim Jiho)

In the fortress of this kingdom, there consists generals who accidentally hurt the feelings of each other's sensitive hearts. On 8 April 2012, Jeong Yong-hwa made a solo guest appearance. On 28 May 2017, the skit returned for the Gag Concert 900th Episode Special (Part 1).

- Child Romance (12 November 2017 – 11 March 2018)

(Korean: 꼬맨스; Starring: Lee Suji, Shim Mungyu, Park Jinho, Lee Sangeun)

- Catchphrase Makers (1 November 2015 – 24 April 2016)

(Korean: 유행어를 전파하는 자 or 유전자; Starring: Park Seongkwang, Ryu Geunji, Jang Yuhwan, Park Bomi, Yang Seonil | Previous Appearances: Lee Sanghun, Kim Huiwon)

A group of comedians who apologise for not making good catchphrases and blatantly pull out catchphrases from their head.

List of Catchphrases

Park Seongkwang:

1. "OK OK, Okinawa" (1 November 2015 – 24 April 2016)
  (Korean: 오키오키 오키나와)
2. "Sorry sorry, Myanmar" (15 November 2015 – 24 April 2016)
  (Korean: 미안 미안 미얀마)
3. "Bye-bye, Dubai" (21 February 2016 – 24 April 2016)
  (Korean: 바이 바이 두바이야)

Ryu Geunji:

1. "Did eating celery make you crazy? Did eating bellflower make you batty? Eat some ginger and get your head straight" (1 November 2015 – 14 February 2016, 6 March 2016, 24 April 2016)
  (Korean: 미나리먹고 미쳤냐? 도라지먹고 돌았냐? 생강먹고 생각 좀 해)
2. "What a basketball-joke. Want to soccer-die? I will keep my bowling-eyes on you." (28 February 2016 – 20 March 2016)
  (Korean: 농구있네, 축구싶냐? 내가 너를 두고~~ 볼링)
3. "Hey, shut it! Shut your hands up! Shut your hands up!" (3 April 2016 – 24 April 2016)
  (Korean: 야 닥쳐! 닥쳐핸접! 닥쳐핸접!)

Yang Sunil:

1. "With the energy from the earth and the energy from the sky..." (1 November 2015 – 14 February 2016)
  (Korean: 대지의 기운과 하늘의 기운을 모아...)
2. "Among the vast life forms that live in the vast plains, with the energy from the earth and the energy from the sky..." (21 February 2016 – 24 April 2016)
  (Korean: 광활한 초원을 누비는 숭고한 생명체들 속에 대지의 기운과 하늘의 기운을 모아...)

Jang Yuhwan:

1. "KIII-YAAK!" (1 November 2015 – 22 November 2015)
  (Korean: 끼이이 --- 약)
2. "It's cold/ah-choo!" (29 November 2015 – 20 December 2015)
  (Korean: 앗 – 추우)
3. "Oops!" (3 January 2016 – 14 February 2016)
  (Korean: 아차차차차차)
4. "Ignored and rejected" (21 February 2016 – 13 March 2016)
  (Korean: 씹혔다 뽀레)
5. "I get it, leave me be..." (20 March 2016 – 24 April 2016)
  (Korean: 아알겠떠엉, 네비동)

Park Bomi:

1. "It hurts, it hurts, it hurts to the apartment" (1 November 2015 – 29 November 2015, 24 January 2016 – 31 January 2016, 6 March 2016)
  (Korean: 아파 아파 아파트로 가자)
2. "Why, why? Wi-fi" (6 December 2015 – 24 April 2016)
  (Korean: 와이 와이 와이파이)
3. "Please, please, my foot" (21 February 2016 – 24 April 2016)
  (Korean: 제발 제발 제 발요)

Kim Huiwon:

1. "Can't!" (3 January 2016)
  (Korean: 못~해!)

Lee Sanghun:

1. "Whatcha doin'? Whatcha sayin'? Americano!" (21 February 2016)
  (Korean: 뭐라카노? 와이카노? 아메리카노!)

Guests:

1. Park Bo-young: "You're talking nonsense, nonsense, nonsense" (22 November 2015)
  (Korean: 헛소리~ 헛소리 헛소리 헛소리 헛소리 헛소리 헛소리 하고있네)
2. Heo Kyung-hwan: "Forget it" (20 December 2015)
  (Korean: 이자 – 뿌스요!)
3. Heo Kyung-hwan: "I'm a cool guy" (20 December 2015)
  (Korean: 믓쟁이-!)

Catchphrases sent in from viewers:

1. "Oh, my gas stove" (10 January 2016)
  (Korean: 오 마이 가스레인지)
2. "Let's go, go, flounder" (17 January 2016)
  (Korean: 가자 가자 가자미)
3. "Get away, or go to a temple... 'Or a church'" (24 January 2016)
  (Korean: 절로 가, 절로 가, 교회 가든지)
4. "What do you mean? 'I'm Kim Gun Mo!'" (31 January 2016)
  (Korean: 뭐긴 뭐야 김건모)
5. "Have some cucumber and come here! I'll eat eggplant and come!" (7 February 2016)
  (Korean: 오이 먹고 오이소, 가지먹고 가지요)
6. "Don't fight! Don't fight! Sawadeekap!" (14 February 2016)
  (Korean: 싸우지마 싸우지마 사와디캅)
- Cheering Squad (10 December 2017 – 14 January 2018)

(Korean: 으샤빠샤!; Starring: Song Yeonggil, Kim Jeonghoon, Kim Hyeseon)

- Crazy Idols (4 March 2018 – 18 March 2018)

(Korean: I 돌 I; Starring: Hong Hyeon-ho, Park Jin-ho, Yoo Min-sang, Shin Yoon-seung, Song Jun-geun)

- Chicken High School (29 June 2014 – 19 July 2015)

(Korean: 닭치高; Starring: Song Jun-geun, Lee Sang-ho, Lee Sang-min, Im Woo-il, Kim Jun-ho, Kim Jae-wook | Previous appearances: Ahn Somi, Kim Min-kyeong)

Playful comedy corner about forgetful chickens who attend the Half marinated, half fried class in Chicken High School. On 7 September 2014, actor Cha Tae-hyun appeared as a guest for the Chuseok special. On 28 December 2014, Defconn and Kim Jong-min appeared as guests for the new year special. On 18 January 2015, actor Yeo Jin-goo appeared as a guest.

- Chungmuro (13 July 2003 – 11 April 2004)

(Korean: 충무로; Starring: Lee Jeongsu, Kim Byungman, Jo Suwon, Eom Taegyeong)

- Comedians' World (7 December 2014 – 21 June 2015)

(Korean: 이.개.세 (이 개그맨들이 사는 세상); Starring: Jeong Beomgyun, Ryu Geunji, Park Sora, Song Yeonggil, Kim Minkyeong, Kim Jaewook, Heo Min, Kim Hoekyeong)

Three skits within a skit, with the same material performed first by attractive comedians, then by ambiguous comedians who try very hard to be funny, and finally by big comedians. On 17 May 2015, Kim Junho appeared in the skit.

- Comedy Idols (2 August 2015 – 7 February 2016)

(Korean: 호불호; Starring: Lee Wongu, Choi Hyojong, Hong Hwon)

Gagmen try to persuade very specific types of people to join their fan club. On 20 September 2015, singer Kang Min-kyeong of Davichi, actor Choi Phillip and restaurateur Hong Seok-cheon appeared as guests for Chuseok special.

- Composers of Sinsa-dong (17 March 2013 – 2 June 2013)

(Korean: 신사동 노랭이; Starring: Lee Sanghun, Kim Seongwon, Song Jungeun, Lee Jonghun, Song Pilgeun)

Musical comedy with three song composers who wear yellow. The skit's title is transliterated as "Yellow Songwriters of Shinsa-dong" which is a parody of producer and songwriter Lee Hoyang (Shinsadong Tiger 신사동호랭이).

- Comfortable Drama (6 May 2018 – 24 June 2018)

(Korean: 편안한 드라마; Starring: Song Jun-geun, Hong Hyeonho, Yoo Min-sang, Jeong Haecheol)

On June 1, 2018, Jimin (AOA) made a special appearance.

- Come Back, Yumi (16 July 2017 – 8 October 2017)

(Korean: 돌아와윰; Starring: Kang Yumi, Son Byeoli, Lee Seunghwan)

Junior comedians attempt to convince Kang Yumi to return to the Gag Concert stage.

- Couple's Court (29 October 2017 – 3 December 2017)

(Korean 고발부부; Starring: Jo Chunghyeon, Lee Changho, Lee Hyeonjeong, Yu Minsang)

- Countryside Love (12 October 2017 – 4 February 2018)

(Korean: 촌's Love; Starring: Song Yeonggil, Kwak Beom, Hong Hyeonho, Hwang Jeonghye)

- Concubines; The War of the Roses (8 December 2013 – 22 June 2014)

(Korean: 후궁뎐; 꽃들의 전쟁; Starring: Lee Sanghun, Jang Hyoin, Kim Kyeong-ah, Kim Nahee, Oh Nami, Jeong Jimin, Lee Yerim, Jo Seunghui)

Stories of concubines and their way of getting the king's attention. The skit is a loose parody of JTBC's Cruel Palace - War of Flowers.

- Conditions of a Gangster (17 February 2013 – 24 March 2013)

(Korean: 건달의 조건; Starring: Kim Jaewook, Yang Seonil, Jeong Chanmin, Kwak Beom, Hong Sunmok)

- Confusing News (20 November 2016 – 7 May 2017)

(Korean: 핵갈린 늬우스; Starring: Jang Kiyeong, Son Byeoli, Lee Changho, Shim Mungyu, Lee Sangeun, Lee Hyeonjeong)

A satirical skit about how the news is reported in North Korea as opposed to the South Korean side.

- Cooking Goya (17 January 2016 – 6 March 2016)

(Korean: 요리하는 고야; Starring: Ahn Sangtae, Jung Seunghwan) Ahn Sangtae's comeback after five years of not appearing on Gag Concert.

- Crazy Love (9 November 2014 – 31 May 2015)

(Korean: 크레이지 러브; Starring: Seo Taehun, Park Seongkwang, Park Jisun, Kim Nahee | Previous Appearance: Kim Wonhyo)

About a crazy couple with Paul Anka's Crazy Love as the signature song.

- Crying Fist (20 February 2005 – 13 November 2005)

(Korean: 주먹이 운다; Starring: Kim Byungman, Jeong Myeonghun)

- Daddy's Little Girl (14 July 2013 – 8 December 2013)

(Korean: 딸바보; Starring: Lee Seungyun, Kim Daeseong, Kim Hyeseon, Lee Jonghun)

A father who is too over-protective and lavishing upon his "beautiful angelic" daughter.

- Daehak-ro Romance (26 January 2014 – 29 June 2014)

(Korean: 대학로 로맨스; Starring: Seo Taehun, Heo Anna, Yu Inseok → Jeong Seunghwan)

A story of a performer in a Daehak-ro theater who broke up with her boyfriend and he is trying to get back to her.

- Dallas (6 July 2014 – 20 July 2014)

(Korean: 달라스; Starring KBS 29th Class Comedians (2014): Park Bomi, Kim Nina, Kim Seunghye, Choi Jaewon, Jeong Seungbin, Song Junseok, Lee Hyeonjeong, Im Jonghyeok, Hong Hyeonho, Lee Sangeun, Yun Seunghyeon, Jeong Jaehyeong)

Remake of 'Differently' from 'The Gag Concert You've Never Seen Before' 2013's Chuseok Special. The skit is about inner thoughts at different situations.

- Dance Chatter (16 June 2013 – 16 March 2014)

(Korean: 댄수다; Starring: Im Woo-il, Kim Jaewook, Heo Min, Song Jungeun, Lee Sangho, Hwang Shinyeong, Ahn Somi)

A tango couple and a modern dance couple have conversations during their performance and demonstrates it through their dance.

- Dating Skills Test (1 June 2014 – 23 November 2014)

(Korean: 연애능력평가; Starring: Jang Yuhwan, Jeong Beomgyun, Shin Jongryeong, Park Seongho)

Lessons about dating; Cheongdam Monkey Teacher (Jeong Beomgyun) solves dating problems, Tweezer Teacher (Shin Jongnyeong) plucks out funny facts, and Daechi Cleoparktra Teacher (Park Seongho) solves numerical problems.

- Decline (8 April 2018 – 10 June 2018)

(Korean: 기울어가; Starring: Kim Minkyeong, Seo Taehun, Yang Seonil, Kim Hoe-kyeong etc.)

On 20 May 2018, Fabien made a guest appearance.

- Deaf Police (20 October 2013 – 1 December 2013)

(Korean: 귀막힌 경찰서; Starring: Song Wangho, Byeon Seungyun, Song Jungeun, Kim Jiho, Yang Sangguk, Park Yeongjin, Park Seongkwang)

About incompetent policemen who do not do their work properly.

- Deep in The Jungle (24 June 2012 – 1 July 2012)

(Korean: 징글 정글; Starring: Yu Minsang, Lee Dongyun, Kim Hyeseon, Ryu Geunji, Song Byeongcheol, Kim Daehui, Ahn Ilgwon)

- Delicious Korean (4 August 2013 – 1 September 2013)

(Korean: 맛있는 한국어; Starring: Jeong Beomgyun, Song Jungeun, Sam Okyere, John, Saldor)

- Descendants of Pyongyang (19 June 2016 – 14 August 2016)

(Korean: 평양의 후예, Starring: Kwon Jae-kwan, Lee Changyun, Im Jonghyuk, Song Jungeun, Lee Changho)

North Korean spies start to get too cozy pretending to be South Korean citizens. On 17 July 2016, KBS announcer Jeong Jiwon appeared on the skit as a guest.

- Despicable Train (21 August 2016 – 4 December 2016)

(Korean: 비호행, Starring: Song Yeonggil, Choi Jaewon, Park Sora, Jang Hana, Kim Hyeongi, Jang Yunseok, Lee Sangeun, Jeong Jaehyeong)

Parody of the Korean zombie apocalypse thriller movie Train to Busan. Similar to the movie, the survivors need to head to the front carriage of the train, but the only way to get past the zombies is to say things to make the zombies feel mad inside.

- Details Kim (10 April 2011)

(Korean: 디테일 김; Starring: Kim Inseok, Lee Jaehun, Seo Taehun, Hong Gyeongjun)

- Detective Song (17 July 2016 – 14 August 2016)

(Korean: 명탐정 송길동, Starring: Song Yeonggil, Jeong Seunghwan, Jeong Jinyeong, Lee Seongdong, Im Jaebaek | Previous Appearances: Park Eunyeong, Kim Nina, Song Jaein, Kwak Beom)

Song Yeonggil plays "Song-lock" Sherlock and Jeong Seunghwan plays "Wat-seung" Watson to solve a murder, but are the two truly the famous detective duo?

- Devils (29 April 2018 – 27 May 2018)

(Korean: 데빌스; Starring: Jeong Yoonho, Song Jeungeun, Song Wangho)

- Did You See That Last Night? (8 November 2015 – 27 December 2015)

(Korean: 어.그.봤 or 어제 그거 봤어?; Starring: Choi Hyojong, Kim Jeonghun)

- Dignity of a Beggar (2 September 2012 – 2 June 2013)

(Korean: 거지의 품격; Starring: Kim Jimin, Heo Kyung-hwan, Kim Yeonghui)

A lady who is always being bothered by a handsome "flowery" beggar wherever she goes and is always ripping her off of ₩500 (the price of "curiosity"), and doing unsanitary things in front of her, and another beggar enamored towards the handsome "flowery" beggar while accusing the lady of being a gold-digger (original context: flower snake 꽃뱀).

- Discoveries in Life (17 April 2011 – 2 June 2013)

(Korean: 생활의 발견; Starring: Song Jungeun, Shin Bora, Kim Kiri, Kim Junhyeon)

About a couple who break up in a serious but funny way.

Venue & Guest List
1. 17 April 2011 – Pork BBQ place
2. 24 April 2011 – Chaotic place (Song Jungeun's place)
3. 1 May 2011 – Potato Soup place
4. 8 May 2011 – Beauty Salon
5. 15 May 2011 – Arcade
6. 22 May 2011 – Restaurant
7. 29 May 2011 – Karaoke
8. 5 June 2011 – Dentist
9. 12 June 2011 – Chicken Feet restaurant
10. 19 June 2011 – Sauna
11. 26 June 2011 – Clothing store
12. 3 July 2011 – Seafood restaurant | Kim Sang-gyeong
13. 17 July 2011 – Funeral
14. 24 July 2011 – Convenient store
15. 31 July 2011 – Vacation in a valley
16. 7 August 2017 – Beach
17. 14 August 20114 – Family Restaurant
18. 28 August 2011 – Restaurant
19. 4 September 2011 – Tent bar
20. 11 September 2011 – Train
21. 25 September 2011 – Hospital
22. 2 October 2011 – Restaurant
23. 9 October 2011 – Wedding ceremony
24. 16 October 2011 – Baseball game
25. 23 October 2011 – Army base
26. 6 November 2011 – Korean fast food place | Song Joong-ki
27. 20 November 2011 – Checkup
28. 27 November 2011 – Subway
29. 4 December 2011 – Street food shop
30. 11 December 2011 – Checking a house
31. 18 December 2011 – Pub
32. 25 December 2011 – Christmas date | Choi Myung-kil
33. 1 January 2012 – Sunrise in Jeongdongjin
34. 8 January 2012 – Skate restaurant | Kim Jong-min
35. 15 January 2012 – Cafe | Kim Do-gyun
36. 22 January 2012 – Chinese restaurant | Lee Young-ja
37. 29 January 2012 – Pizza place | Lee Geum-hui (announcer)
38. 5 February 2012 – Sausage Soup place | Ham Eun-jung (T-ara)
39. 12 February 2012 – Seafood place | Kim Chang-ryeol
40. 19 February 2012 – Italian restaurant | Kim Gook-jin
41. 26 February 2012 – Company Workshop BBQ place | Ji Hyun-woo
42. 4 March 2012 – Food place | Jo Seong-ha
43. 11 March 2012 – Bar | Kim Yeong-cheol
44. 18 March 2012 – Restaurant | Son Sook
45. 25 March 2012 – Rice cake place | Sung Si-kyung
46. 1 April 2012 – Food place | John Park
47. 8 April 2012 – Restaurant | Park Hae-mi
48. 15 April 2012 – Gym | Jeong Seok-won
49. 22 April 2012 – Homemade hamburger shop | Eric (Shinhwa)
50. 29 April 2012 – Cabbage wrap restaurant | Nam Bo-ra
51. 6 May 2012 – Barbecue restaurant | Park Jin-young (JYP)
52. 13 May 2012 – Outdoor restaurant | Tiffany with Taeyeon and Seohyun (Girls' Generation-TTS)
53. 20 May 2012 – Popular restaurant | Gong Hyeong-jin
54. 27 May 2012 – Mud-fish Soup restaurant | Park Bo-young
55. 3 June 2012 – Restaurant | Baek Ji-young
56. 10 June 2012 – Seafood Noodles restaurant | Sohee (Wonder Girls)
57. 17 June 2012 – Japanese Ramen restaurant | Lee Seongwoo (No Brain)
58. 24 June 2012 – Cheap Pork Belly restaurant | Kim Seong-ryeong
59. 1 July 2012 – Spaghetti restaurant | Park Han-byul
60. 8 July 2012 – Spicy Octopus restaurant | Jang Yoon-ju
61. 15 July 2012 – Ice-cream shop | Jo Kwon (2AM)
62. 22 July 2012 – High-priced Beef restaurant | Lee Hui-jun
63. 29 July 2012 – Samgyetang restaurant | Jang Wooyoung (2PM)
64. 5 August 2012 – Bean-soup Noodles restaurant | Min Hyo-rin
65. 12 August 2012 – Campground | HaHa & Skull
66. 19 August 2012 – Buckwheat Noodles restaurant | Yang Hui-gyeong
67. 26 August 2012 – Seafood Pancakes restaurant| Bae Suzy (Miss A)
68. 2 September 2012 – Budaejjigae restaurant | Hyolyn (SISTAR)
69. 9 September 2012 – Eels restaurant | Lee Gi-kwang (B2ST)
70. 16 September 2012 – Fried Shrimp restaurant | Goo Hara (Kara)
71. 23 September 2012 – Juice restaurant | Han Sunhwa (SECRET)
72. 30 September 2012 – Dakgalbi restaurant during Chuseok | Kim Nam-joo and Yoo Jun-sang from My Husband Got a Family
73. 7 October 2012 – Bibimbap restaurant | Kim Won-jun
74. 14 October 2012 – Thai restaurant | TVXQ
75. 21 October 2012 – Conch shell restaurant | Lee Byeong-jun
76. 28 October 2012 – Chicken restaurant | Min (Miss A)
77. 4 November 2012 – Launderette | Kim Jong-kook
78. 11 November 2012 – Barley dish restaurant | Song Ji-hyo and Han Sang-jin
79. 18 November 2012 – Bibimbap restaurant | UEE (After School)
80. 25 November 2012 – Pancake restaurant | Lee Seung-gi
81. 2 December 2012 – Thai restaurant | Hong Ji-min and Kim Jung-min
82. 9 December 2012 – Pizza Parlor | Yang Yoseob (B2ST)
83. 16 December 2012 – 24 hours restaurant | Kim Min-jung
84. 23 December 2012 – Beef soup restaurant | Kim In-kwon
85. 30 December 2012 – Cafe at Misari | Park Shin-yang
86. 6 January 2013 – "Hello Chicken" restaurant | Kim Tae-gyun and Jeong Chan-woo (Cultwo)
87. 13 January 2013 – Cocktail bar | Lee Kwang-soo and Ji Dae-han
88. 20 January 2013 – Pig Trotter restaurant | Ha Chun-hwa
89. 27 January 2013 – Folk pub | Jeong Yong-hwa with CNBLUE
90. 3 February 2013 – Party restaurant | Hwang Shin-hye
91. 10 February 2013 – Concert Hotel Dinner show | Nam Jin
92. 17 February 2013 – New York Style hot dog shop | Yoon Shi-yoon
93. 24 February 2013 – Raw Fish restaurant | Kim Tae-woo (g.o.d.)
94. 10 March 2013 – Beef restaurant | SHINee
95. 17 March 2013 – Steamed Chicken shop | Lee Hoon
96. 24 March 2013 – Steamed Clam shop | Brave Brothers
97. 31 March 2013 – Squid and Bulgogi restaurant | G.NA
98. 7 April 2013 – Waffle shop | Hwang Kwanghee with ZE:A FIVE
99. 14 April 2013 – Bibimbap restaurant | Davichi
100. 28 April 2013 – Jjamppong restaurant| HyunA and Heo Ga-yoon (4Minute)
101. 5 May 2013 – Seafood stew restaurant| Yoon Je-moon
102. 12 May 2013 – Homemade Burger shop | Hyomin and Jiyeon (T-ara N4)
103. 19 May 2013 – Thai restaurant | 2PM
104. 26 May 2013 – Beef Soup place | Im Won-hee
105. 2 June 2013 – Fishing area | Choo Sung-hoon
- Disgrace of a Family (3 November 2002 – 24 November 2002)

(Korean: 가문의 망신; Starring: Kang Seong-beom, Kim Sook, Lee Tae-sik, Lee Byeong-jin, Moon Se-yoon, Heo Seung-jae)

- DJ Byeon (1 March 2009 – 2 May 2010)

(Korean: DJ변; Starring: Byeon Kisu, Jeong Beomgyun → Lee Gwangseop, Kim Junhyeon | Previous Appearances: Kwak Hangu)

- Do Re Mi Trio (20 October 2002 – 4 April 2004)

(Korean: 도레미 트리오 1; Starring: Jeong Hyeongdon, Kim Inseok, Lee Jaehun)

Musical comedy.

- Do Re Mi Trio 2 (4 July 2004 – 26 September 2004)

(Korean: 도레미 트리오 2; Starring: Jeong Hyeongdon, Kim Inseok, Yu Sangmoo)

Musical comedy.

- Do Your Job! (21 December 2014)

(Korean: 일당뛰어; Starring: Kwak Beom, Oh Gihwan, Namgung Gyeongho, Shin Yunseung, Lee Changho)

- Doctor Fish (2 March 2008 – 21 September 2008)

(Korean: 닥터피쉬; Starring: Yu Seyun, Lee Jonghun, Yang Sangguk, Song Byeongcheol)

A skit about a rock band and their number 1 fan. On 21 May 2017, the skit returned for the Gag Concert 900th Episode Special (Part 2).

- Don't Cross that River (4 June 2017 – 25 June 2017)

(Korean: 님아 그 강을 건너지 마오, Starring: Kim Janggun, Lee Seongdong, Jeong Jaehyeong, Kim Nina)

Lee Seongdong is finally released from prison, and he meets of a gullible elderly couple and a policeman who do things to tempt him.

- Don't Give In (10 March 2013 – 25 August 2013)

(Korean: 버티고; Starring: Kim Jiho, Heo Anna, Lee Seongdong, Ryu Jeongnam, Kim Janggun, Kwon Jae-kwan, Kim Hyeongi, Kim Junho)

Remake of 'Don't Give In' from 'The Gag Concert You've Never Seen Before' 2013's Seollal (Korean New Year) Special. Three hopefuls wanting to land a role in a movie who have to endure being subjected to actress Heo Anna's physical hits.

- Double Debate (20 June 2010 – 16 October 2011)

(Korean: 두분토론; Starring: Kim Kiyeol, Park Yeongjin, Kim Yeonghui)

- Drunken (16 March 2014 – 2 November 2014)

(Korean: 취해서 온 그대; Starring: Seo Taehun, Shin Yunseung, Kim Daeseong, Lee Huigyeong, Lee Jonghun, Lee Seungyun | Previous Appearances: Hong Yeseul, Kim Hyeseon)

About a bartender who goes through a lot of trouble when crazy customers start showing up at his bar. A play on You Who Came from the Stars, as evidenced by Kim Hyeseon's character who acts like Cheon Songyi. On 7 September 2014, actress Kim Su-mi appeared as a guest for Chuseok special. On 14 September 2014, Let It Be members were customers at the bar.

- Dry Cleaning (20 December 2009 – 27 June 2010)

(Korean: 드라이 클리닝; Starring: Hong Ingyu, Yun Hyeongbin, Lee Jonghun, Kim Jiho, Jeong Gyungmi → Ahn Somi)

Musical Comedy.

- Dumb & Dumber Show (22 June 2014 – 14 September 2014)

(Korean: 덤앤더머 쇼 or 덤 앤 더머 Show; Starring: Kim Seongwon, Song Byeongcheol, Lee Sangho, Lee Sangmin)

Unique and unparalleled mime show featuring the twins working in unison to put on a slapstick performance; Kim Seongwon does the sounds and voices while the twins act them out. Song Byeongcheol is the translator. The corner starts with Willy Wonka's Welcome Song from the movie Charlie and the Chocolate Factory.

List of Stories
1. 22 June 2014 – Police and Thief
2. 29 June 2014 – Police and Escaped Prisoner
3. 6 July 2014 – Tarzan and Poacher
4. 13 July 2014 – Kevin and the Robber from the movie Home Alone
5. 20 July 2014 – Martial Arts Battle between Bruce Lee and Jackie Chan
6. 27 July 2014 – Bartender and Wanted Criminal, parody of western movies
7. 3 August 2014 – Bank Teller and Bank Robber
8. 10 August 2014 – Parody of the movie Men in Black with Kenny Muhammad (American beatboxer) as a special guest
9. 24 August 2014 – Female Ghost and Exorcist
10. 31 August 2014 – Batman and Joker
11. 7 September 2014 – Terminator and T-1000, parody of the movie The Terminator with the twins' father (Lee Unu) as a guest for Chuseok special
12. 14 September 2014 – James Bond and villain, parody of James Bond series
- Eagle Five (21 November 2004 – 23 January 2005)

(Korean: 이글파이브; Starring: Park Junhyeong, Hong Gyeongjun, Yu Sangmu, Byeon Kisu, Heo Donghwan)

- Emergency Meeting (14 August 2011 – 17 June 2012)

(Korean: 비상대책위원회; Starring: Kim Wonhyo, Song Byeongcheol, Kim Junhyeon, Kim Junho, Kim Daeseong) A bomb is about to go off but none of the officials seem cooperative.

- Emergency Meeting (3 April 2016)

(Korean: 회의자들, Starring: Ahn Sangtae, Kim Kiyeol, Kim Nahui, Jang Kiyeong, Lee Wongu, Lee Changho)

A quirky meeting between the boss and his employees as their company goes bankrupt. Not to be confused with skit of the same English title that aired in 2011–2012.

- Eunuchs (22 April 2018 – 13 May 2018)

(Korean: 내시천하; Starring: Jang Yoonseok, Kim Junho, Ryu Geunji, Song Yeonggil)

- Expert Housewife (25 November 2012)

(Korean: 주부 9단; Starring: Choi Hyojong, Hong Sunmok, Seong Hyeonju)

- Explosive Situation (31 January 2016 – 20 March 2016)

(Korean: 일촉즉발; Starring: Yang Sangguk, Jang Kiyeong, Kim Kiyeol, Jeong Haecheol, Yang Seonil)

About the sensitive interactions between soldiers from North Korea, South Korea, and the United Nations at the Korean Demilitarized Zone. Yang Sangguk's comeback after one and a half years of not appearing on Gag Concert.

- Extreme Theater Troupe (20 August 2017 – 8 October 2017)

(Korean: 극단적 극단, Starring: Jo Chunghyeon, Bang Juho, Kim Seunghye, Ahn Sangtae, Lee Sangeun, Choi Heeryeong, Jeong Yunho, Jo Jinse, Jang Hana, Im Seongwook, Bae Jeonggeun)

- Fairy Tale Beats (25 December 2016 – 15 January 2017)

(Korean: 비트는 동화, Starring: Lee Sangeun, Lee Sanghun, Kwak Beom, Kim Hyeongi, Lee Sejin, Choi Huiryeong)

Fairy tales told in a rap mixtape. The skit involves musical and lyrical parody of various Korean hip-hop songs by Korean rappers like Bobby, iKON and BewhY.

- Family's Love (7 August 2005 – 5 March 2006)

(Korean: 사랑의 가족; Starring: Park Junhyeong, Jeong Jongcheol, Oh Jiheon)

- Fashion 7080 (4 June 2006 – 4 March 2007)

(Korean: 패션 7080; Starring: Park Junhyeong, Oh Jiheon, Park Hwisoon, Hong Gyeongjun, Yun Hyeongbin, Song Byeongcheol)

- Fashion No. 5 (16 October 2011 – 8 January 2012)

(Korean: 패션 NO.5; Starring: Jang Doyeon, Heo Anna, Park Narae, Jeong Eunseon, Park Sora)

- Father and Son (29 April 2012 – 7 April 2013)

(Korean: 아빠와 아들; Starring: Yoo Min-sang, Kim Soo-yeong)

About an overweight father and son who think alike when it comes to food.

- Fools in Space (19 April 2015 – 20 December 2015)

(Korean: 우주 라이크; Starring: Park Yeongjin, Song Byeongcheol, Jeong Seunghwan, Song Yeonggil, Jeong Jaehyeong | Previous Appearances: Kim Nahee, Park Jisun)

About stupid astronauts in space and their dreams of eating food like normal people. On 17 May 2015, Kim Nahee joined the skit. On 7 June 2015, Park Jisun joined the skit.

- Forever Alone (15 September 2013 – 25 May 2014)

(Korean: 안 생겨요; Starring: Song Yeong-gil, Yoo Min-sang)

About two still single and alone guys who failed to get a girlfriend in their past 15 → 16 years. Song Yeong-gil was married on 8 June 2014, two weeks after the broadcast of the final episode of the skit.

- Final Weapon Her (18 September 2011 – 29 January 2012)

(Korean: 최종병기 그녀; Starring: Lee Seongdong, Kim Huiwon, Kim Hyeseon, Kim Taewon)

- First Timers (18 January 2015 – 5 April 2015)

(Korean: 서툰 사람들; Starring: Yu Inseok, Kim Wonhyo, Song Jungeun, Hong Sunmok, Jang Hyoin)

About nervous employees running a business for the first time who keep mixing up the customer's orders. Yu Inseok plays a first-time waiter, Kim Wonhyo, a first-time chef. Song Jungeun, a first-time restaurant-owner, Hong Sunmok, a first-time manager, and Jang Hyoin, the customer.

- Flash Shopping (26 September 2004 – 8 May 2005)

(Korean: 깜빡 홈쇼핑; Starring: Kim Jincheol, Ahn Sangtae, Kang Juhui)

- Flower Band (25 March 2018 – 15 April 2018)

(Korean: 꽃길밴드; Starring: Lee Sangmin, Lee Sangho, Park Hwisun, Ahn Somi, Park Soyeong, Kim Min-kyeong, Yang Seonil, Park Jinho, Son Byeoli)

- Four Great Emperors (27 June 2004 – 31 October 2004)

(Korean: 사대천왕; Starring: Hwang Seunghwan, Kim Byungman, Ryu Dam, Jo Suwon, Lee Sugeun, Lee Kyungu)

- Four Men (15 January 2012 – 30 June 2013)

(Korean: 네가지; Starring: Kim Kiyeol, Yang Sangguk, Heo Kyung-hwan, Kim Junhyeon, Lee Wongu)

Problems faced by four → five (types of) men that the world (women in general) looks down upon, and their counter-arguments: unpopular men, country bumpkins, short men, fat men, and bald men.

- Four People, Four Colours (9 November 2003 – 27 June 2004)

(Korean: 4인4색; Starring: Eom Taegyeong, Kim Kisu, Kim Sangtae, Oh Jiheon, Choi Huiseon)

- Full House (4 December 2011 – 10 June 2012)

(Korean: 풀하우스; Starring: Jeong Gyeongmi, Yu Minsang, Heo Min, Kim Kyeong-ah, Kim Minkyeong, Kim Soo-yeong, Lee Sangho, Lee Sangmin, Lee Seungyun, Jeong Seunghwan)

About a family living in a house which is barely smaller than an average room, ergo, "Full House".

- Fussy Mr. Byeon (2007.03.18 ~ 2007.12.30)

(Korean: 까다로운 변선생; Starring: Byeon Kisu, Song Byeongcheol, Kim Kiyeol, Lee Jonghun, Kwon Jae-kwan, Park Junhyeong, Byeon Seungyun)

- GagConcert Star KBS (13 June 2010 – 27 November 2011)

(Korean: 슈퍼스타 KBS; Starring: Lee Gwangseop, Shin Bora, Heo Anna, Ahn Yoon-sang, Kim Jaewook, Lee Sangho, Lee Sangmin)

Musical comedy.

Starring List
- A Ballerina who loved a Singer: Seo Taehun, Jang Doyeon
- Ahn Yoon-sang (A group of stars all together)
- Angelic voice Shin Bo-ra
- Army: Ryu Geunji, Im Woo-il, Lee Sanghun, Jo Yunho
- Blood-type Brothers: Jeong Seunghwan, Kim Jeonghun, Lee Sanghun, Jeong Jinyeong
- Don't Tell Mama (R&B Sisters): Shin Goeun, Park Jisun
- Hwang Hyeonhui Dance Troupe: Jo Yunho, Ahn Somi, Hwang Hyeonhui, Kim Huiwon, Nam Yeonghwan
- Miss Korea: Kim Jimin, Jeong Gyungmi, Shin Goeun, Kim Kiri → Jo Yunho
- Overwhelming Boys: Hong Hwon, Jeong Taeho, Jang Kiyeong
- Ppong Brothers (Trot version songs): Lee Sangho, Kim Jaewook, Lee Sangmin
- Serena Heo: Heo Anna
- Techno couple: Kim Jin, Park Narae
- The Unbalanced: Ahn Somi, Jeong Eunseon, Lee Huigyeong
- The Vibrations: Yoon Hyungbin → Lee Dongyun, Heo Kyung-hwan, Ahn Ilgwon
- The Incredible Girls: Heo Min, Hong Nayeong, Park Soyeong
- Vocal Music Group: Park Soyeong, Heo Anna, Heo Min
- We Love K-POP: Byeon Seungyun, Park Jisun → Song Jungeun, Kim Seongwon
- Gag Jockey Commandos (1 February 2004 – 6 June 2004)

(Korean: 개그J특공대; Starring: Park Junhyeong, Jo Seho, Lee Sugeun, Kang Juhui)

A parody of KBS's VJs on the Scene.

- Gag Power (25 January 2004 – 7 November 2004)

(Korean: 개그 대국; Starring: Park Seongho, Yun Seokju, Heo Donghwan, Jang Donghyeok)

- Gag Warrior 300 (8 April 2007. – 1 July 2007)

(Korean: 개그전사 300; Starring: Yun Seongho, 22nd Class | Previous Appearances: Jung Myunghun, Kim Daehui, Kim Junho, Lee Sugeun, Kim Byungman)

Showcase of the 22nd class comedians, also a parody of the movie 300.

- Gatecrashers (21 December 2003 – 21 March 2004)

(Korean: 불청객; Starring: Lee Sugeun, Kim Byungman, Jo Suwon, Ryu Dam)

- General (23 October 2005 – 25 December 2005)

(Korean: 장군, Starring: Kim Sideok, Kim Byeongman, Lee Sugeun)

A kingdom loves to celebrate their great general, Kim Byeongman. On 28 May 2017, the skit returned for the Gag Concert 900th Episode Special (Part 3).

- Genome Project (19 June 2016 – 31 July 2016)

(Korean: 게놈 프로젝트, Starring: Park Sora, Jo Suyeon, Park Eunyeong, Jang Hana, Kim Min-hee | Previous Appearances: Ahn Somi, Oh Nami)

It has been 100 years since the extinction of men, and Park Sora leads a team of researchers to find out more about men and their habits.

- Geojedo (3 February 2013 – 16 June 2013)

(Korean: 거제도; Starring: Shin Bora, Jeong Taeho, Kim Minkyeong, Kim Hoekyeong)

- Get Up (29 November 2015 – 31 January 2016)

(Korean: 일어나; Starring: Lee Chan, Lee Sejin, Kim Byeong-seon, Ryu Geunil, Lee Changho, Lee Hyeonjeong, Kim Kiri, Kim Huiwon, Kim Seongwon, Kim Nahui)

- Girls in the Army (29 September 2013 – 20 October 2013)

(Korean: 군대온 걸; Starring: Kim Kyeong-ah, Jeong Myeonghun, Heo Anna, Hong Nayeong, Park Seongho)

Remake of 'Girls in the Army' from 'The Gag Concert You've Never Seen Before' 2013's Chuseok Special. In the year 2157, women are now mandated by law to serve in the Korean military, and the skit portrays the funny side of female conscription.

- Go Home (8 January 2017 – 26 March 2017)

(Korean: 돌아가, Starring: Lee Sanghun, Jeong Yunho, Jeong Seungbin, Yun Seunghyeon)

Lee Sanghun acts like a big boss alongside two of his lackeys and beat people up outside, but invites them home for them to find out their boss is complete opposite from a charismatic boss.

- Go Jo Show (19 January 2014 – 16 March 2014)

(Korean: 고조쇼; Starring: Park Seongho, Jeong Beomgyun, Jeong Haecheol, Park Jisun)

A skit interviewing Grandpa Go Jo (parody of the old-style sentence ender 고조), a very old yet still fit man who has lived way back since the 1894 Donghak Peasant Revolution. His friend entrance is followed by the signature song You Are My Destiny. Grandma Nae Rae (내래), parody of the old-style self-reference, is in some relationship with Grandpa Go Jo (an ambiguous relationship where one is not a couple "officially" yet acts like a couple).

- Go Stop (23 December 2012)

(Korean: 고! 스톱?; Starring: Kim Kiyeol, Jo Yunho, Hong Hwon, Kim Jeonghun, Im Woo-il)

- God of Hip Hop (24 August 2014 – 18 January 2015)

(Korean: 힙합의 신 (쇼 미더 뭐니?!); Starring: Kim Soo-yeong, Kim Nina, Ahn Somi, Lee Sangeun, Kim Hoekyeong, Kim Kiri, Park Bomi, Lee Sejin, Kim Huiwon, Kim Seongwon | Previous Appearances: Seo Namyong (Yang Grimy), Yun Seunghyeon (Missed Swings), Lee Changho (Buddhistablo), Park Eunyeong, Ryu Geunil, Jeong Jaehyeong, Kwak Beom, Hong Yeseul)

Musical parody of Mnet's reality program Show Me the Money in a show named Show Me the What? (Show Me The 뭐니?) hosted by Hamburger Patty (Kim Soo-yeong).

List of Participants
1. Teddy Kim (Kim Seongwon) is a rapper from Los Angeles, U.S., he must rap in Korean without using English words. On 26 October 2014, he emerged as 'Kim Seongwon' who must rap with something appropriate for public television.
2. Lee Sangeun the teenage rapper who wants to devote his life to hip-hop, his father (Kim Hoegyeong) raps against his son's ambitions; parody of NooMA & TAX's True Lies. On 19 October Kim Huiwon joined the group.
3. Kiri Clown (Kim Kiri) and Park Bomi express the pain of breaking up through music; parody of Soyu and Mad Clown's Stupid in Love.
4. Lee Sejin the businessman rapper, he must rap without promoting his business.
5. Old Friends (Jeong Jaehyeong & Kwak Beom) the uncooperative hip-hop duo.
6. Ryu Geunil rapper from Chungcheong-do, despite being portrayed as a country bumpkin, he is the fastest talker in the neighborhood who can rap.
- Good Morning Korean (30 January 2011 – 4 September 2011)

(Korean: 굿모닝 한글; Starring: Lee Huigyeong, Lee Jonghun, Kim Seongwon, Song Jungeun, Matthew Sleight)

- Goose Bumps (28 July 2013 – 29 September 2013)

(Korean: 소름; Starring: Lee Chan, Seo Taehun, Song Jungeun, Jang Yuhwan, Kim Junhyeon)

Horror stories that will give you chills in the middle of summer.

- Grandma's Angry Horns (28 September 2008 – 6 September 2009)

(Korean: 할매가 뿔났다; Starring: Yu Seyun, Yu Sangmoo, Jang Dongmin)

Yu Seyun is a playful kid who makes the elders around him work. On 21 May 2017, the skit returned for the Gag Concert 900th Episode Special (Part 2) with Song Yeonggil instead of Yu Sangmu.

- Great Legacy (20 November 2011 – 22 April 2012)

(Korean: 위대한 유산; Starring: Hwang Hyeonhui, Kim Daeseong, Kim Huiwon, Ahn Somi)

- Group Assignment (19 November 2017 – 8 April 2018)

(Korean: 조별과제; Starring : Park Sora, Shin Yoonseung, Ryu Geunji, Choi Huiryeong, Jang Yoonseok)

- Guardian Angel (2 April 2017 – 7 May 2017)

(Korean: 수호천사, Starring: Hong Hyeonho, Jung Seungbin)

Reading from a comic book, Hong Hyeonho wished for a guardian angel. But his guardian angel is not what he expected to be.

- Gym Girl (10 July 2011 – 27 November 2011)

(Korean: 헬스걸; Starring: Lee Seungyun, Lee Huigyeong, Kwon Mijin, Lee Jonghun)

- Handsome CSI (20 March 2011 – 7 August 2011)

(Korean: 꽃미남 수사대; Starring: Lee Gwangseop, Kim Daeseong, Ryu Geunji, Kim Wonhyo, Park Seongho)

Fashionista policemen are on their way to catch a criminal.

- Health Boy (22 July 2007 – 14 October 2007)

(Korean: 헬스보이; Starring: Lee Sangmin, Lee Seungyun, Lee Sangho)

A fitness project done between the 3 comedians.

- Help Me! (13 April 2014 – 4 January 2015)

(Korean: 선배, 선배!; Starring: Lee Suji, Jo Suyeon, Jeong Myeonghun, Ryu Geunji, Kim Janggun, Park Seongho, Lee Wongu)

About a student from Gag Concert University who has a crush on her senior and try to seek advice from an unconcerned friend. On 28 December 2014, EXID appeared as guests for the New Year's special.

- HER (8 November 2015 – 1 May 2016)

(Korean: 허ㄹ or 헐; Starring: Seo Taehun, Park Sora, Oh Nami, Kim Nahui, Lee Suji | Previous appearances: Kim Nina)

Seo Taehun's peculiar stories about his past loves.

- Here Comes the Groom (18 December 2016 – 22 January 2016)

(Korean: 신랑입장, Starring: Song Byeongcheol, Kwon Jae-kwan, Song Jungeun, Yang Seonil)

Some married men meet up to relate to each other's troubles in marriage.

- Hidden Masters (5 January 2014 – 9 November 2014)

(Korean: 깐죽거리 잔혹사; Starring: Lee Dongyun, Heo Min, Ryu Jeongnam, Ahn Ilgwon, Jo Yunho, Lee Seongdong, Lee Changho)

About a father and daughter who refuse to pay business protection money and use martial arts to evict the bad guys. A play on the movie Once Upon a Time in High School, whose original transliterated title is Maljukgeori Street's Cruel History. On 7 September 2014, DJ DOC's Kim Changryeol appeared as a guest for Chuseok special. On 2 November 2014, Taekwondo Demonstration Team appeared as special guests. On 9 November 2014, four vocalists (Kim Gyeonghun, Jo Wonil, Kim Yeongjae, Jeon Yeongju) appeared as special guests.

- Hidden Plagiarism (9 March 2014 – 13 April 2014)

(Korean: 숨은 표절찾기; Starring: Jeong Jimin, Park Eunyeong, Lee Sanghun → Song Jungeun, Kwon Jae-kwan, Lee Chan, Kim Byeong-seon)

Meeting between drama production staff (Drama department) and Gag Concert staff (Variety Show department) to discuss phrases and actions plagiarized from Gag Concert and used in drama.

Plagiarism List
1. 9 March 2014 – Good Morning Doctor (parody of KBS's Good Doctor): BBOOM Entertainment's Geumsun (Park Eunyeong) | The King Of Ratings' Mr. Park (Park Sungkwang) and Kim Hoe Gyeong | Just Relax's Kim Yeonghee | Hidden Masters Jo Yunho.
2. 16 March 2014 – The Unheirs (parody of SBS's The Heirs): Concubines' Jeong Jimin | The Yellow Sea's Hong Sunmok | BBOOM Entertainment's Shin Bora, Aengdu (Jang Yunseok) and Mingki (Kim Hyeseon) | Rookie News Kim Daehui and Kim Wonhyo.
3. 23 March 2014 – Crazy Iris (parody of KBS's IRIS): BBOOM Entertainment's Kim Jimin | Dance Chatters' Maximus (Kim Jaewook) and Monica (Heo Min) | BBOOM Entertainment's Gija (Kim Junho) | Forever Alone's Song Yeong Gil and Yu Minsang.
4. 30 March 2014 – You Who Rolled In Like a Vine (parody of SBS's You Who Came From the Stars): Concubines' Oh Nami | The grandfather (Lee Jonghun) from Just Relax | Madam Jeong's Madam Jeong (Jeong Taeho) and Sophie (Kim Daeseong) who acted as also as Na Ae-ri from Legends of Legends | Lobbyist's Park Jisun.
5. 6 April 2014 – Dream Hire (parody of KBS's Dream High): The Yellow Sea's Lee Suji | The Three Friends' Bok Hyunkyu, Kim Kiri and Yu Inseok | Just Relax's Kim Junhyun | Emergency Meeting's Kim Wonhyo and Kim Junhyun.
6. 13 April 2014 – The Final Stages of Aurora's Princess Disease (parody of MBC's notorious Princess Aurora): In Your Dreams' Yu Inseok and Kim Hyeongi | Seoul Mate's Yang Sangguk | Badump Badump's Lee Munjae and Jang Hyoin.
- High Pitch Impossible (29 January 2006 – 9 July 2006)

(Korean: 고음 불가; Starring: Ryu Dam, Lee Sugeun, Byeon Kisu)

Musical comedy.

- High Speed Camera (13 September 2009 – 17 January 2010)

(Korean: 초고속 카메라; Starring: Yu Sangmoo → Lee Gwangseop, Yu Minsang, Byeon Seungyun)

Portrays scenarios that shows more than meets the eye in slow motion.

- Honest Home Shopping (1 May 2016)

(Korean: 솔까홈쇼핑, Starring: Heo Min, Yu Minsang, Kwak Beom, Kim Nahui, Jo Chunghyeon)

A home shopping channel that sells their products with utmost honesty.

- Horror Special (8 May 2016 – 7 August 2016)

(Korean: 남량특집, Starring: Kim Seunghye, Hong Hyeonho, Lee Hyeonjeong, Seo Taehun)

A man and his reluctant girlfriend seek shelter for the night. However, "scary" matters start to unfold, scaring the man in various ways.

- Hot Issue (19 April 2015 – 10 May 2015)

(Korean: 핫이슈; Starring: Jeong Beomgyun, Kim Jaewook, Yang Seonil, Song Jungeun)

Reporters from Ctrl + c, Ctrl + v agency fishing for some breaking news that could be the headline even if they had to make up the news themselves.

- I Bet My Life (10 February 2008 – 30 March 2008)

(Korean: 내 인생에 작업걸었네; Starring: Kim Wonhyo, Lee Gwangseop → Jeong Myeonghun, Kwak Hangu → Yang Sangguk)

- Idiotic Robot (5 March 2017 – 29 October 2017)

(Korean: 봇말려, Starring: Park Jinho, Hong Hyeonho, Ahn Somi, Seo Taehun → Kim Hyeseon)

When your mail-order robots go wrong. On 21 May 2017, idols Momo and Dahyun from Twice appeared on the skit as guests for the Gag Concert 900th Episode Special (Part 2). On 28 May 2017, rapper Jang Woo-hyuk appeared on the skit as guests for the Gag Concert 900th Episode Special (Part 3).

- I'd Like to Ask a Favor (17 June 2018 – 8 July 2018)

(Korean: 부탁 좀 드리겠습니다; Starring: Kim Won-hyo)

- I Respect You (25 May 2014 – 22 June 2014)

(Korean: 존경합니다; Starring: Seo Taehun, Kim Junhyeon, Song Byeongcheol, Park Jisun)

About a congressman who decided to join the presidential election and has to deal with ignorant assistants who do not respect him, and a crazy wife, Yu Hyera (Park Jisun), who is a drama maniac.

- I'm a Father (7 April 2013 – 16 June 2013)

(Korean: 나는 아빠다; Starring: Park Seongho, Hong Ingyu, Song Jungeun, Kim Daehui)

The difficulties a modern father faces being the family's breadwinner with young children.

- I'm a Killer (15 February 2015 – 1 November 2015)

(Korean: 나는 킬러다; Starring: Yu Minsang, Song Byeongcheol, Kim Jimin, Song Wangho, Namgung Gyeongho, Kwak Beom, Shin Yunseung | Previous Appearance: Bok Hyeongyu)

About 7 killers who always fail in their mission. On 12 April 2015, EXID's Hani appeared as the 7th killer. On 19 April 2015, Jin Se-yeon appeared as a policewoman. On 26 April 2015, AOA (Jimin, Choa, Mina) appeared as the 7th killer. On 20 September 2015, actor Park Sung-woong appeared as a guest for Chuseok special.

- I'm So Sad (2 November 2014 – 8 March 2015)

(Korean: 속상해; Starring: Kim Jiho, Kim Minkyeong, Song Byeongcheol, Jeong Taeho)

Jeong Taeho, who plays Sukja, Kim Jiho's aunt, tries to seduce her nephew's tutor, Song Byeongcheol.

- I'm the King (11 January 2015 – 29 March 2015)

(Korean: 왕입니다요; Starring: Lee Munjae, Lee Sanghun, Jeong Seunghwan, Kim Seunghye, Park Sora | Previous Appearances: Bok Hyeonkyu, Song Junseok)

A corner featuring scenes from Joseon dynasty, a king and his people.

- I'm the Only Guy (17 August 2014 – 28 December 2014)

(Korean: 나 혼자 남자다; Starring: Park Seongkwang, Heo Anna, Seong Hyeonju, Kim Nina, Ahn Ilgwon, Jeong Seunghwan)

About a new employee, the only straight male, in a company whose workforce is predominantly women, and who finds the company culture bizarre. A satire on male dominated workplaces in which women have to put up with macho, blokish "just be one of the lads" work cultures. On 28 December 2014, actress Cho Yeo-jeong appeared as a guest for the New Year's special.

- If I Was Tall or I Wish I Were Taller (24 June 2007 – 24 February 2008)

(Korean: 키컸으면; Starring: Lee Sugeun, Jeong Myeonghun, Jang Doyeon)

The two short comedians talk about their struggles with a catchy song. On 28 May 2017, the skit returned for the Gag Concert 900th Episode Special (Part 3) and EXID's Hani, Junghwa, LE, and Hyelin appeared as guests for the skit.

- Interview (8 January 2006 – 20 August 2006)

(Korean: 인터뷰; Starring: Park Junhyeong, Jeong Jongcheol, Park Seongho, Sam Hammington | Previous Appearance: Oh Jiheon, Byeon Seungyun)

- In Pursuit (22 January 2017 – 19 February 2017)

(Korean: 땀복근무, Starring: Song Yeonggil, Lee Seongdong, Jang Kiyeong, Song Junseok, Heo Min, Park Sora, Kim Jeonghun)

Song Yeonggil is a criminal being chased by policemen for his wrongdoings, literally on treadmills.

- In Your Dreams (15 December 2013 – 30 March 2014)

(Korean: 놀고있네; Starring: Yu Inseok, Kim Hyeongi)

Unemployed friends who use their imagination to portray their dreams.

- Investigative Report 60 Minutes (30 June 2013 – 21 July 2013)

(Korean: KBS 스페셜 그것이 알고싶은 추적 60분 수첩; Starring: Kim Daehui, Hwang Hyeonhui, Im Jaehun, Jeong Yunho, Jeong Jimin, Namgung Gyeongho, Song Pilgeun)

- Inner Voices (19 November 2017 – 21 January 2018)

(Korean: 속보이스; Starring: Kim Junho, Yang Seonil, Jeong Jinyeong, Song Jeungeun, Jeong Seunghwan, Jeong Haecheol, Kim Hwaegyeong)

On 21 January 2018, Kim Dong-hyun made a special appearance.

- Is This For Real? (29 January 2017 – 12 March 2017)

(Korean: 이거 실화냐?, Starring: Kim Kiyeol, Park Soyeong, Park Sora, Yang Seonil, Lee Wongu)

Kim Kiyeol discusses about stuff people do that he simply cannot understand.

- Jaebaek (30 August 2015 – 13 September 2015)

(Korean: 재백아; Starring: Im Jaebaek, Lee Sejin, Lee Changho)

About gangsters who want to make a living through honest labor.

- Jang Star Entertainment (14 August 2016 – 6 November 2016)

(Korean: 장스타 ent., Starring: Jang Kiyeong, Song Jaein, Kwak Beom, Namgung Gyeongho, Lee Sejin, Kim Taewon)

"Jang Star" Jang Kiyeong runs an entertainment agency with his quirky idols and trainers.

- Jinx (28 August 2016 – 18 September 2016)

(Korean: 징크스, Starring: Lee Sanghun, Oh Gihwan, Lee Munjae, Lee Changho | Previous Appearances: Song Junseok)

About some extremely passionate national athletes who attempt to eliminate the chance of a jinxed game later on.

- Jjanjjan Theatre (1 June 2003 – 30 May 2004)

(Korean: 짠짠극장; Starring: Heo Seungjae, Jeong Myeonghun, Kim Yeongsam, Choi Huiseon)

- Just a Movie (29 May 2016 – 5 June 2016)

(Korean: 영화는 영화다, Starring: Kim Seongwon, Im Woo-il, Kim Taewon, Lee Sangeun, Kim Min-hee, Song Jaein, Jo Chunghyeon)

Actors have several problems settling into their role during the filming of a movie.

- Just Relax (4 August 2013 – 25 May 2014)

(Korean: 편하게 있어; Starring: Kim Junhyeon, Song Byeongcheol, Lee Jonghun, Lee Suji)

Portraying the relationship between the boss and his employee outside of work.

- Just the Two of Us (25 December 2016)

(Korean: 둘이서도 잘해요, Starring: Jang Yunseok, Kim Byeong-seon, Lee Suji)

Two guy friends end up drinking by themselves after their other friends did not turn up, so they play drinking games by themselves, bitterly.

- K-JOB Star (12 February 2012 – 19 February 2012)

(Korean: K-JOB 스타; Starring: Ahn Ilgwon, Park Seongho, Park Jisun, Im Woo-il, Kim Kiyeol, Lee Seongdong, Lee Jonghun, Song Jungeun)

- Kim Sideok's Voice Talk Show (26 October 2003 – 18 January 2004)

(Korean: 김시덕의 보이스 토크; Starring: Kim Sideok, Choi Guk)

Kim Sideok appears as the host of the show interviews many celebrities, portrayed by Choi Guk. Choi Guk dresses as celebrities and instead of his actual voice, it would be voice recordings of the actual celebrity he was acting as.

- Kind Souls (1 October 2006 – 3 June 2007)

(Korean: 착한녀석들; Starring: Yoo Se-yoon, Oh Jiheon, Lee Jonghun)

Introduces a trio who deliver their dialogue in a glib sly manner, before ending with an innocent twist.

- King of Inventions (20 November 2005 – 1 January 2006)

(Korean: 발명왕; Starring: Kim Byungman, Hwang Hyeonhui)

- Knew This Would Happen (8 May 2016 – 25 December 2016)

(Korean: 이럴줄알고, Starring: Park Yeongjin, Song Jungeun, Yang Seonil, Song Byeongcheol, Jang Kiyeong)

Two rivals know each other inside out, creating hilarious twists and turns in the skit because they "knew it would happen". On 5 June 2016, Lee Sang-min of Roo'ra appeared on the skit as a guest. On 12 June 2016, UFC fighter Kim Dong-hyeon and UFC octagon girl Kim Ha-na appeared on the skit as guests. On 19 June 2016, couple Im Yo-hwan and Kim Ga-yeon appeared on the skit as guests. On 26 June 2016, Lee Su-geun returned to the show as a special guest on the skit. On 3 July 2016, girl group DIA's Chaeyeon and Huihyeon appeared on the skit as guests. On 10 July 2016, national marathoner Lee Bong-ju appeared on the skit as a guest. On 17 July 2016, cheerleader Park Ki-ryang appeared on the skit as a guest.

- Korea, Be Happy! (10 March 2013 – 12 May 2013)

(Korean: 우행쇼; Starring: Im Jaehun, Hong Hwon, Park Yeongjin)

- Korea's Most Proud in History and Legendary Handsome Comedian Jeong Myeonghun is Coming so Stand Aside, Bow, Chant Hurray, Start the Music, Bob Your Shoulders, Start Humming, Start Dancing, Offer Up Your Entire Fortune and Do a Big Bow, But Not Twice, Raise Your Hand if You Heard All That, Keep Them Up and Wave Good-bye (18 December 2016 – 4 June 2017)

(Korean: 건국 이래 최고로 자랑스런 대한민국 전설의 미남 개그맨 정명훈 나가신다 길을 비키고 머리를 조아리고 만세를 외치고 풍악을 울려 어깨춤을 추고 콧노래를 부르며 스텝을 밟고 전 재산을 바치고 큰 절을 하여라 하지만 두번은 안 된다~ 들은 사람 손! 내리지 말고 흔드세요~안녕~, Starring: Jeong Myeonghun, Jeong Seunghwan, Song Yeonggil, Kim Jeonghun)

16-year comedian Jeong Myeonghun is expected to outshine the two other less-experienced comedians for a funny reaction to a situation, since he is so experienced. The skit title changes every episode to add on a few words each time. On 2 April 2017, Cosmic Girls appeared on the skit as guests.

List of Skit Title Changes
1. 18 December 2016 – Jeong Myeonghun | 정명훈 (Original title)
2. 25 December 2016 – Comedian Jeong Myeonghun | 개그맨 정명훈
3. 1 January 2017 – Legendary Comedian Jeong Myeonghun | 전설의 개그맨 정명훈
4. 8 January 2017 – Korea's Legendary Comedian Jeong Myeonghun | 대한민국 전설의 개그맨 정명훈
5. 15 January 2017 – Korea's Legendary Comedian Jeong Myeonghun is Coming | 대한민국 전설의 개그맨 정명훈 나가신다
6. 22 January 2017 – Korea's Legendary Comedian Jeong Myeonghun is Coming so Stand Aside | 대한민국 전설의 개그맨 정명훈 나가신다 길을 비켜라
7. 29 January 2017 – Korea's Legendary Handsome Comedian Jeong Myeonghun is Coming so Stand Aside | 대한민국 전설의 미남 개그맨 정명훈 나가신다 길을 비켜라
8. 5 February 2017 – Korea's Legendary Handsome Comedian Jeong Myeonghun is Coming so Stand Aside and Bow | 대한민국 전설의 미남 개그맨 정명훈 나가신다 길을 비키고 머리를 조아려라
9. 12 February 2017 – Korea's Proud Legendary Handsome Comedian Jeong Myeonghun is Coming so Stand Aside and Bow | 자랑스런 대한민국 전설의 미남 개그맨 정명훈 나가신다 길을 비키고 머리를 조아려라
10. 19 February 2017 – Korea's Proud Legendary Handsome Comedian Jeong Myeonghun is Coming so Stand Aside, Bow and Chant Hurray | 자랑스런 대한민국 전설의 미남 개그맨 정명훈 나가신다 길을 비키고 머리를 조아리고 만세를 외쳐라
11. 26 February 2017 – Korea's Proud Legendary Handsome Comedian Jeong Myeonghun is Coming so Stand Aside, Bow, Chant Hurray and Start the Music | 자랑스런 대한민국 전설의 미남 개그맨 정명훈 나가신다 길을 비키고 머리를 조아리고 만세를 외치고 풍악을 울려라
12. 5 March 2017 – Korea's Proud Legendary Handsome Comedian Jeong Myeonghun is Coming so Stand Aside, Bow, Chant Hurray, Start the Music and Bob Your Shoulders | 자랑스런 대한민국 전설의 미남 개그맨 정명훈 나가신다 길을 비키고 머리를 조아리고 만세를 외치고 풍악을 울려 어깨춤을 추어라
13. 12 March 2017 – Korea's Proud Legendary Handsome Comedian Jeong Myeonghun is Coming so Stand Aside, Bow, Chant Hurray, Start the Music, Bob Your Shoulders and Start Humming | 자랑스런 대한민국 전설의 미남 개그맨 정명훈 나가신다 길을 비키고 머리를 조아리고 만세를 외치고 풍악을 울려 어깨춤을 추고 콧노래를 불러라
14. 19 March 2017 – Korea's Most Proud Legendary Handsome Comedian Jeong Myeonghun is Coming so Stand Aside, Bow, Chant Hurray, Start the Music, Bob Your Shoulders and Start Humming | 최고로 자랑스런 대한민국 전설의 미남 개그맨 정명훈 나가신다 길을 비키고 머리를 조아리고 만세를 외치고 풍악을 울려 어깨춤을 추고 콧노래를 불러라
15. 26 March 2017 – Korea's Most Proud in History and Legendary Handsome Comedian Jeong Myeonghun is Coming so Stand Aside, Bow, Chant Hurray, Start the Music, Bob Your Shoulders and Start Humming | 건국 이래 최고로 자랑스런 대한민국 전설의 미남 개그맨 정명훈 나가신다 길을 비키고 머리를 조아리고 만세를 외치고 풍악을 울려 어깨춤을 추고 콧노래를 불러라
16. 2 April 2017 – Korea's Most Proud in History and Legendary Handsome Comedian Jeong Myeonghun is Coming so Stand Aside, Bow, Chant Hurray, Start the Music, Bob Your Shoulders and Start Humming and Start Dancing | 건국 이래 최고로 자랑스런 대한민국 전설의 미남 개그맨 정명훈 나가신다 길을 비키고 머리를 조아리고 만세를 외치고 풍악을 울려 어깨춤을 추고 콧노래를 부르며 스텝을 밟아라
17. 9 April 2017 – Korea's Most Proud in History and Legendary Handsome Comedian Jeong Myeonghun is Coming so Stand Aside, Bow, Chant Hurray, Start the Music, Bob Your Shoulders, Start Humming, Start Dancing and Offer Up Your Entire Fortune | 건국 이래 최고로 자랑스런 대한민국 전설의 미남 개그맨 정명훈 나가신다 길을 비키고 머리를 조아리고 만세를 외치고 풍악을 울려 어깨춤을 추고 콧노래를 부르며 스텝을 밟고 전 재산을 바쳐라
18. 16 April 2017 – Korea's Most Proud in History and Legendary Handsome Comedian Jeong Myeonghun is Coming so Stand Aside, Bow, Chant Hurray, Start the Music, Bob Your Shoulders, Start Humming, Start Dancing, Offer Up Your Entire Fortune and Do a Big Bow | 건국 이래 최고로 자랑스런 대한민국 전설의 미남 개그맨 정명훈 나가신다 길을 비키고 머리를 조아리고 만세를 외치고 풍악을 울려 어깨춤을 추고 콧노래를 부르며 스텝을 밟고 전 재산을 바치고 큰 절을 하여라
19. 23 April 2017 – Korea's Most Proud in History and Legendary Handsome Comedian Jeong Myeonghun is Coming so Stand Aside, Bow, Chant Hurray, Start the Music, Bob Your Shoulders, Start Humming, Start Dancing, Offer Up Your Entire Fortune and Do a Big Bow, But Not Twice | 건국 이래 최고로 자랑스런 대한민국 전설의 미남 개그맨 정명훈 나가신다 길을 비키고 머리를 조아리고 만세를 외치고 풍악을 울려 어깨춤을 추고 콧노래를 부르며 스텝을 밟고 전 재산을 바치고 큰 절을 하여라 하지만 두번은 안 된다
20. 30 April 2017 – Korea's Most Proud in History and Legendary Handsome Comedian Jeong Myeonghun is Coming so Stand Aside, Bow, Chant Hurray, Start the Music, Bob Your Shoulders, Start Humming, Start Dancing, Offer Up Your Entire Fortune and Do a Big Bow, But Not Twice, Raise Your Hand if You Heard All That | 건국 이래 최고로 자랑스런 대한민국 전설의 미남 개그맨 정명훈 나가신다 길을 비키고 머리를 조아리고 만세를 외치고 풍악을 울려 어깨춤을 추고 콧노래를 부르며 스텝을 밟고 전 재산을 바치고 큰 절을 하여라 하지만 두번은 안 된다~ 들은 사람 손
21. 7 May 2017 – Korea's Most Proud in History and Legendary Handsome Comedian Jeong Myeonghun is Coming so Stand Aside, Bow, Chant Hurray, Start the Music, Bob Your Shoulders, Start Humming, Start Dancing, Offer Up Your Entire Fortune and Do a Big Bow, But Not Twice, Raise Your Hand if You Heard All That... Now Put Them Down | 건국 이래 최고로 자랑스런 대한민국 전설의 미남 개그맨 정명훈 나가신다 길을 비키고 머리를 조아리고 만세를 외치고 풍악을 울려 어깨춤을 추고 콧노래를 부르며 스텝을 밟고 전 재산을 바치고 큰 절을 하여라 하지만 두번은 안 된다~ 들은 사람 손! 내리세요
22. 4 June 2017 – Korea's Most Proud in History and Legendary Handsome Comedian Jeong Myeonghun is Coming so Stand Aside, Bow, Chant Hurray, Start the Music, Bob Your Shoulders, Start Humming, Start Dancing, Offer Up Your Entire Fortune and Do a Big Bow, But Not Twice, Raise Your Hand if You Heard All That, Keep Them Up and Wave Good-bye | 건국 이래 최고로 자랑스런 대한민국 전설의 미남 개그맨 정명훈 나가신다 길을 비키고 머리를 조아리고 만세를 외치고 풍악을 울려 어깨춤을 추고 콧노래를 부르며 스텝을 밟고 전 재산을 바치고 큰 절을 하여라 하지만 두번은 안 된다~ 들은 사람 손! 내리지 말고 흔드세요~안녕~
- Large Love (19 June 2016 – 14 May 2017)

(Korean: 사랑이 LARGE, Starring: Kim Minkyeong, Yu Minsang, Im Woo-il, Song Byeongcheol → Kim Hoekyeong)

To this couple, what could be more important than food, even when they are facing a break-up? On 7 August 2016, actor Shim Hyeong-tak appeared on the skit as a guest.

- Last Health Boy (1 February 2015 – 24 May 2015)

(Korean: 라스트 헬스보이; Starring: Lee Seungyun, Bok Hyeongyu, Kim Soo-yeong, Lee Jonghun, Lee Changho)

The goal of this skit "project" is to help Kim Soo-yeong lose weight and reach a two digit weight by losing 70 kg, and to help Lee Changho gain weight and bulk up to 70 kg. If this project fails, Lee Seungyun will quit Gag Concert for a month. On 29 Mar 2015, model Lee Yeon appeared at the end of the skit. On 5 April 2015, trainer Jeong Ah-reum appeared. On 26 April 2015, Kwon Mijin who was in Health Girl skit appeared. On 3 May 2015, Lee Jonghun brought his friend to the skit.

Weight & Weight Change
1. 1 February 2015 – Lee Changho (51.5 kg) | Kim Soo-yeong (168.25 kg)
2. 9 February 2015 – Lee Changho (52 kg) gained 500g | Kim Soo-yeong (156.5 kg) lost 12 kg
3. 15 February 2015 – Lee Changho (52.65 kg) gained 650g | Kim Soo-yeong (149.2 kg) lost 7.3 kg
4. 22 February 2015 – Lee Changho (53 kg) gained 350g | Kim Soo-yeong (143.75 kg) lost 5.5 kg
5. 1 March 2015 – Lee Changho (53.9 kg) gained 900g | Kim Soo-yeong (136.4 kg) lost 7.2 kg
6. 8 March 2015 – Lee Changho (54.8 kg) gained 900g | Kim Soo-yeong (132.2 kg) lost 4.2 kg
7. 15 March 2015 – Lee Changho (55.6 kg) gained 800g | Kim Soo-yeong (128.4 kg) lost 3.8 kg
8. 22 March 2015 – Lee Changho (56.7 kg) gained 1.1 kg | Kim Soo-yeong (125.3 kg) lost 3.1 kg
9. 29 March 2015 – Lee Changho (57.3 kg) gained 600g | Kim Soo-yeong (121.2 kg) lost 4.1 kg
10. 5 April 2015 – Lee Changho (58.1 kg) gained 800g | Kim Soo-yeong (118 kg) lost 3.2 kg
11. 12 April 2015 – Lee Changho (59.6 kg) gained 1.5 kg | Kim Soo-yeong (114.8 kg) lost 3.2 kg
12. 19 April 2015 – Lee Changho (60.9 kg) gained 1.3 kg | Kim Soo-yeong (112.3 kg) lost 2.5 kg
13. 26 April 2015 – Lee Changho (62 kg) gained 1.1 kg | Kim Soo-yeong (108.85 kg) lost 3.5 kg
14. 3 May 2015 – Lee Changho normal weight with broad shoulders | Kim Soo-yeong (106.3 kg) lost 2.5 kg
15. 10 May 2015 – Lee Changho normal weight with chest muscles | Kim Soo-yeong (103 kg) lost 3.3 kg
16. 17 May 2015 – Lee Changho normal weight with big back muscles | Kim Soo-yeong (100.85 kg) lost 2 kg
17. 24 May 2015 – Lee Changho normal weight with hot body | Kim Soo-yeong (98.3 kg) lost 2.5 kg
- In 16 weeks Lee Changho gained 11 kg while Kim Soo-yeong lost 70 kg
- Late Love (22 December 2013 – 28 September 2014)

(Korean: 끝사랑; Starring: Kwon Jae-kwan, Park Sora, Jeong Taeho, Kim Yeonghui)

Romance of middle-aged couple. Their signature song is Tae Jin-ah's 태진아#대표 앨범. On 7 September 2014, Tae Jin-ah appeared as a guest for Chuseok special.

- Leave Her Alone (10 May 2009 – 30 May 2010)

(Korean: 그냥 내비둬; Starring: Lee Sugeun, Jang Donghyeok, Song Byeongcheol, Kim Minkyeong)

About two men watching a lovey-dovey couple from afar, making comments about them. On 28 May 2017, the skit returned for the Gag Concert 900th Episode Special (Part 3).

- Legends of Legends (14 July 2013 – 12 January 2014)

(Korean: 전설의 레전드; Starring: Seo Taehun, Lee Dongyun, Shin Bora → Kim Nahee, Lee Sangho, Lee Sangmin, Kim Daeseong, Yu Minsang | Previous Appearance: Kim Taewon)

Musical comedy about school life filled with various colourful characters. The skit starts with A Pink's No No No.

List of Episodes
1. 14 July 2013 – Introductions.
2. 21 July 2013 – Songs.
3. 28 July 2013 – Talent quest | Female twins, their catchphrases are: 풀잎아~ 풀잎아~ 신풀잎~ (Pulip~ Pulip~ Shin Pulip~) and 어머~ 대박대박 대박사건 (Omo~ Daebak daebak daebak sageon → Oh, my! That's just unbelievable)
4. 4 August 2013 – Na Ae-ri the school bully, her catchphrase is 확그냥 막그냥 여기저기 막그냥 막그냥 (Hwag keunyang mak keunyang yeogi jeogi mak keunyang mak keunyang → Why I oughta! Well I oughta!)
5. 11 August 2013 – Stolen MP3 player | Next week teaser about Pulip being sick.
6. 18 August 2013 – Love letter | Next week teaser about Pulip's family graduation photos.
7. 25 August 2013 – Debt collector | Next week teaser about their residence.
8. 8 September 2013 – Nurse's office | Next week teaser about The Golden Bell Challenge.
9. 15 September 2013 – Sports day | Secret Garden drama parody | Ailee's I will show you| Next week teaser about Usain Nut "Usain Bolt parody".
10. 22 September 2013 – Cinema in Chuseok's holiday | Special appearance of Madam Jeong’s Jeong Taeho, Hong Ingyu's son & BBOOM Entertainment’s Kim Junho.
11. 29 September 2013 – Transfer student Kim Byeol (Kim Nahee) | Next week teaser about handsome as sculpture transfer student.
12. 6 October 2013 – Cooking class | Next week teaser about cooking competition.
13. 13 October 2013 – Film festival | MV making with IVY's Sonata of Temptation | Next week teaser about acting teacher who is the idol (Ryu Geunji) from The King of Ratings skit.
14. 20 October 20130 – Train station | Musical highlights instead of teaser with Song Gol Mae's A Chance Encounter.
15. 27 October 2013 – Talent show | Thanks notebook | Musical replay with Psy's You in Vague Memory.
16. 3 November 2013 – New uniforms | Pervert "flasher" | Musical replay with JYP's Honey.
17. 10 November 2013 – Charity bazaar | Musical replay with Lee Junghyun's Wa.
18. 17 November 2013 – PR model students | BBOOM Entertainment's Kim Jimin parody | Miss Korea parody | Musical reply with JYP's Swing Baby.
19. 24 November 2013 – Band for music contest | Musical reply with Sechs Kies's The Way This Guy Lives.
20. 1 December 2013 – Final exams | Musical reply with Psy's Gentleman.
21. 8 December 2013 – Camping.
22. 22 December 2013 – Charismas performance | BBOOM Entertainment’s Shin Bora Parody.
23. 29 December 2013 – Shin Pulip moves to US | Han Iseul as new student.
24. 5 January 2014 – Surprise confession.
25. 12 January 2014 – Gag Concert World.
- Let It Be (1 June 2014 – 28 June 2015)

(Korean: 렛잇비; Starring: Song Pilgeun, Park Eunyeong, Lee Dongyun, Noh Ujin)

Musical comedy; office workers sing about work and their concerns to the tune of The Beatles' Let It Be. On 7 September 2014, real workers who have to work hard throughout the national holidays appeared as guests for the Chuseok special; Yu Changseon (a fireman who talked about poor drives and prank calls), Kang Hyejin (nurse), Lee Hyeonu (unemployed guy who hunts for jobs), and Jeon Jeongok (housewife, Park Eunyeong's mother).

- Let's Study (9 March 2003 – 7 September 2003)

(Korean: 공부합시다; Starring: Kim Inseok, Kim Youngsam)

- Life Symphony (27 May 2007)

(Korean: 생활교향곡; Starring: Lee Sugeun, Jeong Myeonghun, Kim Byungman, Hong Sunmok, Han Mingwan)

- Like a Family (7 February 2016 – 13 November 2016)

(Korean: 가족같은; Starring: Kim Junho, Park Jiseon, Park Hwisun, Kim Daeseong, Lee Hyeonjeong, Lee Suji, Park Soyeong | Previous Appearances: Song Jungeun)

A noisy family and their noisy daily life. On 24 April 2016, fitness model Ray Yang appeared on the skit as a guest. On 1 May 2016, idols Tzuyu, Nayeon, and Jeongyeon from Twice appeared on the skit as guests.

- Lobbyist (25 August 2013.08.25 – 5 January 2014)

(Korean: 로비스트; Starring: Ryu Geunil, Jeong Seunghwan, Park Jisun, Kim Minkyeong, Kwon Jae-kwan, Kim Seongwon)

When all else fails in negotiations, the world's greatest lobbyists are in the unlikely forms of two middle-aged ahjummas who are good in persuasion at all costs.

- Look Again (30 October 2016 – 1 January 2016)

(Korean: 다시보기, Starring: Jeong Haecheol, Kwak Beom, Song Wangho, Im Jaebaek, Kim Nina, Lee Sangeun, Park Soyeong, Lee Wongu, Jeong Yunho, Lee Hyeonjeong, Lee Changho)

Same subject, different perspectives. A skit about hearing what different people think or say about the same thing.

- Loud Singing (26 February 2017 – 28 May 2017)

(Korean: 고성방가, Starring: Jang Donghyeok, Lee Hyeonjeong, Im Jonghyeok)

A skit about a noisy family with a father who is brusque, mother who always feels deceived, and son who has no interest in studying. Comedian Jang Donghyeok's return to comedy after 6 years. On 28 May 2017, singers Noh Sa-yeon and Lee Moo-song appeared on the skit as guests for the Gag Concert 900th Episode Special (Part 3).

- Love Counselor (7 May 2006 – 10 June 2007)

(Korean: 사랑의 카운셀러; Starring: Kang Yu-mi, Yoo Se-yoon)

About a duo that demonstrates everything about being with your significant other. On 21 May 2017, the skit returned for the Gag Concert 900th Episode Special (Part 2).

- Love is Everywhere (28 October 2007 – 6 April 2008)

(Korean: 사랑이 팍팍; Starring: Lee Seungyun, Lee Sangho, Lee Sangmin, Han Mingwan, Jang Doyeon)

- Love is So Hard (26 February 2017 – 30 April 2017)

(Korean: 사랑 참 어렵다, Starring: Park Eunyeong, Kwak Beom)

The boyfriend who made his girlfriend angry begs outside her front door for forgiveness, but he unluckily misses every single opportunity to prove that he is sincere.

- Lover (14 May 2006 – 3 December 2006)

(Korean: 연인; Starring: Kim Ji-min, Yoo Sang-moo)

The skit that first spread the rumours of Kim Ji-min and Yoo Sang-moo dating, later proving to be true. On the last airing of the skit, actress Han Ji-min made an appearance.

- Lovers (20 January 2002 – 15 September 2002)

(Korean: 연인들; Starring: Lee Taesik, Kim Jihye, Kim Daehui, Choi Huiseon)

- Low Life (14 November 2004 – 5 February 2006)

(Korean: 하류인생 (下類人生); Starring: Kim Junho, Kim Dae-hui, Yun Seongho)

Parody of the movie of the same name.

- Managers (15 October 2017 – 26 November 2017)

(Korean:관리자들; Starring: Jeong Seungbin, Im Seongewook, Jang Hana)

- Madam Jeong (8 July 2012 – 16 June 2013)

(Korean: 정여사; Starring: Song Byeongcheol, Kim Daeseong, Jeong Taeho)

A salesman's woes regarding rich people, in particular Madam Jeong (Jeong Taeho), her daughter Sophie (Kim Daeseong), and their "pet" Brownie which is a stuffed toy husky.

- Magic Performance (18 February 2007 – 4 March 2007)

(Korean 매직 퍼포먼스; Starring: Kim Jaewook, Han Mingwan, Hong Sunmok, Lee Sangho, Park Narae)

- Malicious Virus (2 November 2008 – 8 March 2009)

(Korean: 악성(樂聖) 바이러스; Starring: Kim Junho, Kim Junhyeon, Song Jungeun, Shin Goeun)

Parody of the drama Beethoven Virus.

- Mandeuk (27 January 2013)

(Korean: 만득이; Starring: Heo Min, Lee Munjae, Lee Seungyun)

- Manga Teacher (14 August 2016 – 13 November 2016)

(Korean: 꽃샘주의, Starring: Lee Suji, Im Jonghyuk, Park Soyeong, Kim Nina)

Park Soyeong and Kim Nina are determined to bully the new trainee teacher Im Jonghyuk, but he charmingly steers clear of them, even making the judo girl Lee Suji fall in love with him and save him from the duo.

- Manly Men (7 February 2016 – 16 October 2016)

(Korean: 상남자들; Starring: Jeong Myeonghun, Kim Kiyeol, Jeong Seunghwan, Seo Taehun)

Sore losers who cannot forget their past love.

- Mantis Kindergarten (25 September 2011 – 24 June 2012)

(Korean: 사마귀 유치원; Starring: Jeong Beomgyun, Park Soyeong, Hong Nayeong, Jo Jihun, Park Seongho, Choi Hyojong)

- Man from the Future (2 July 2017 – 6 August 2017)

(Korean: 미래에서 온 남자, Starring: Park Seongkwang, Park Yeongjin, Yang Seonil, Hong Hyeonho)

Park Seongkwang's talk show about a man coming from the year 2087, but he comes with peculiar traits.

- Mappagi (27 August 2006 – 25 March 2007)

(Korean: 마빡이; Starring: Park Junhyeong, Jeong Jongcheol, Kim Sideok, Kim Daebeom)

- Marry Yoo Min-sang Off or MYMO (12 October 2014 – 1 February 2015)

(Korean: 유민상 장가보내기 프로젝트 or 유장프; Starring: Yoo Minsang, Song Yeonggil, Hong Hyeonho, Jeong Seungbin)

A skit to marry off Yoo Minsang. Coffee Boy's Will I Get Married as signature song. The skit was abolished without saying goodbye to viewers and the project ended as a failure.

- Master Show (9 December 2007 – 13 November 2011)

(Korean: 달인; Starring: Ryu Dam, Kim Byungman, Noh Ujin)

A master of anything whose claims are put to the test in a funny manner. Gag Concert's longest skit. On 28 May 2017, the skit returned for the Gag Concert 900th Episode Special (Part 3).

- Me Against the World (19 October 2014 – 23 November 2014)

(Korean: 세상아 덤벼라; Starring: Lee Wongu, Jeong Beomgyun, Kim Junhyeon, Lee Changho, Shin Jongryeong, Park Yeongjin)

About police trying to negotiate with a crazy desperado.

- Meditation (5 July 2015 – 20 September 2015)

(Korean: 과대명상; Starring: Shin Yunseung, Kwak Beom, Noh Woo-jin, Park Eunyeong, Kim Junho)

Four people meditating to heal their mind and body from stress, but they seem to misunderstand the concept.

- Memories of a Beggar (8 June 2003 – 16 November 2003)

(Korean: 걸인의 추억; Starring: Jeong Hyeongdon, Kim Sideok, Lee Gyeongwu)

- Men's News (3 November 2013)

(Korean: 남자뉴스; Starring: Jeong Beomgyun, Hwang Hyeonhui, Lee Wongu, Park Seongho)

- Minsang Debate (5 April 2015 – 8 November 2015)

(Korean: 민상토론 1; Starring: Yu Minsang, Kim Daeseong, Park Yeongjin | Previous Appearances: Lee Sanghun → Song Jungeun, Kim Seunghye)

A debate that should be about politics. On 20 September 2015, Ilya Belyakov joined the debate as one of the audience. On 1 November 2015, Park Yeongjin announced his marriage to his girlfriend, which took place on 23 January 2016.

- Minsang Debate 2 (13 November 2016 – 27 November 2016)

(Korean: 민상토론 2, Starring: Yu Minsang, Kim Daeseong, Song Jungeun)

Part 2 of the original skit, but this time Song Jungeun pesters the two comedians for their political views. The skit ended due to the departure of director Jo Jun-hui, and the skit moved on as Young President.

- Mission Impossible (9 March 2003 – 13 July 2003)

(Korean: 미션 임파서블; Starring: Choi Guk, Yun Seongho)

- Morning of Savana (4 September 1999 – 24 June 2000)

(Korean: 사바나의 아침; Starring: Shim Hyeonseop, Kim Yeongcheol, Baek Jaehyeon, Kim Kyunghee, Kim Daehui, Kim Jihye, Kim Mihwa, Kim Junho)

Notable as this was one of the first skits to appear in Gag Concert.

- Movie Little Television (21 August 2016 – 11 December 2016)

(Korean: 무비 리틀 텔레비전 or 무.리.텔, Starring: Lee Sanghun, Song Yeonggil, Song Wangho)

Three actors from Chungmuro start their own live internet broadcast and act based on the comments.

- Musical (3 September 2006 – 2 September 2007)

(Korean: 뮤지컬; Starring: Kim Jaewook, Yu Minsang, Shin Bongseon, Noh Ujin, Lee Dongyun)

Musical comedy/tragedy. The main theme is The Foundations' Build Me Up Buttercup.

- My Boss (10 June 2012 – 17 June 2012)

(Korean: 박부장; Starring: Park Yeongjin, Park Sora, Kim Taewon, Ryu Jeongnam)

- My Name is Ahn Sang Soon or My Lovely Sang Soon (18 March 2007 – 13 January 2008)

(Korean: 내 이름은 안상순; Starring: Ahn Sangtae, Yun Hyeongbin, Jeong Gyeongmi)

A parody of MBC's drama My Lovely Sam Soon.

- Mystery Theater (22 October 2006 – 11 February 2007)

(Korean: 미스테리 극장; Starring: Lee Sangho, Lee Sangmin, Kang Juhui, Kang Seunghui)

- My Mother-in-law is Strange (9 July 2017 – 24 September 2017)

(Korean: 시엄마가 이상해, Starring: Lee Munjae, Park Eunyeong, Kim Jiho, Kim Kyeong-ah)

Parody of KBS weekend drama My Father is Strange. Park Eun-yeong has a hard time due to her irritating mother-in-law, Kim Kyeong-ah, but then comes Kim Kyeong-ah's mother-in-law, Kim Ji-ho, who gives her a difficult time.

- Myeonghun, Myeonghun, Myeonghun (4 June 2017 – 18 March 2018)

(Korean: 명훈아 명훈아 명훈아; Starring: Jeong Myeonghun, Kim Minkyeong, Oh Nami, Lee Hyeonjeong)

Three glamorous ladies try to entice Jeong Myeonghun with their charms.

- Nami and Bungbung (22 March 2015 – 19 July 2015)

(Korean: 나미와 붕붕; Starring: Oh Nami, Lee Sangho, Lee Sangmin, | Semi-fixed casts: Kim Nahee, Ahn Somi)

Parody of 1990 hit song Like an Indian Doll by Nami & Boom Boom. In this skit, Oh Nami tries to hit on guys from the audience.

- Navigation (2 May 2004 – 25 July 2004)

(Korean: 네비게이션; Starring: Yu Sangmu, Yu Seyun, Jang Dongmin)

- Neighborhood Personnel Hearing (15 June 2014 – 20 July 2014)

(Korean: 우리 동네 청문회; Starring: Kim Hoekyeong, Lee Seungyun, Park Jisun, Kim Daeseong, Park Yeongjin)

Kim Hoekyeong is the host of the personnel hearing, Lee Seungyun is questioned about his suitability to run a business. Park Jisun works with the truth, Kim Daeseong talks about the facts, and Park Yeongjin pinpoints things that have nothing to do with the purpose of the hearing.

- Never Let You Go (12 June 2016 – 21 August 2016)

(Korean: 죽어도 못 보내, Starring: Yu Minsang, Song Wangho, Park Sora, Oh Gihwan, Kim Hyeongi, Song Yeonggil, Lee Seongdong, Shim Mungyu, Kim Taewon | Previous Appearances: Song Byeongcheol)

Drama happens when you have to pick an animal to slaughter for your restaurant.

- News Nine-Ish (26 December 2010 – 4 September 2011)

(Korean: 9시쯤 뉴스; Starring: Jeong Gyeongmi, Jang Donghyeok, Heo Min, Kim Junhyeon, Kim Jimin | Previous Appearances: Lee Sugeun, Song Jungeun, Shin Bora, Kim Wonhyo, Lee Gwangseop, Lee Sanghun)

- Nobody Listens (4 October 2015 – 25 October 2015)

(Korean: 갑툭튀; Starring: Song Jungeun, Kim Nahui, Jang Yunseok, Kim Soo-yeong, Kim Byeong-seon)

- No Big Difference (30 November 2014 – 21 June 2015)

(Korean: 도찐개찐; Starring: Park Seongho (13), Lee Jonghun, Ryu Geunil, Kwak Beom, Kim Byeong-seon)

Musical comedy where two things are compared, to which the conclusion is that there is no big difference between them. They also compared some styles from celebrity which is worse than before on 'one step back'.

- Ohseong and Haneum (12 May 2013 – 24 November 2013)

(Korean: 오성과 한음; Starring: Lee Hyeseok, Kim Jincheol, Kwak Beom)

Two friends who spend their days tossing a baseball back-and-forth while talking about daily life.

- Old Affair (1 June 2014 – 4 January 2015)

(Korean: 쉰 밀회; Starring: Kim Jimin, Kim Daehui | Previous Appearance: Kim Daeseong, Yu Minsang)

Parody of JTBC's Secret Love Affair: Yu Ain (Kim Daehui) is piano genius kid, and Kim Huiae (Kim Jimin) is his piano teacher. On 28 September 2014, pianist Shin Jiho appeared as a special guest. On 28 December 2014, actor Kim Sang-Joong appeared as a guest for the New Year's special. On 28 May 2017, the skit returned for the Gag Concert 900th Episode Special (Part 1).

- Ongals (27 May 2007 – 28 October 2007)

(Korean: 옹알스; Starring: Chae Gyeongseon, Jo Junwu, Jo Suwon)

- Owls (11 January 2015 – 15 March 2015)

(Korean: 부엉이; Starring: Lee Sanggu, Lee Hyeseok, Jang Yunseok, Song Junseok, Kim Nahee | Previous Appearances: Park Seongho (13), Ryu Geunil)

Stories from the forest.

- Park Seongho's Music Talk (21 October 2000 – 27 October 2002)

(Korean: 박성호의 뮤직토크; Starring: Park Seongho)

- PD Hwang Hyeonhui's Consumer Report (2008.07.06 ~ 2009.08.30)

(Korean: 황현희PD의소비자고발; Starring: Hwang Hyeonhui, Yu Minsang, Ahn Yeongmi)

- Pick Me Up (1 May 2016 – 8 May 2016)

(Korean: 픽미업, Starring: Kim Seunghye, Kim Kiyeol, Jeong Haecheol, Yang Seonil | Previous Appearance: Jang Kiyeong)

When 2 robbers happen to commit robbery in the same place at the same time.

- Pink Lady (28 October 2012 – 9 December 2012)

(Korean: 핑크 레이디; Starring: Kim Janggun, Jo Seunghui, Ryu Geunji, Kwon Jae-kwan, Lee Dongyun, Ahn Somi, Kim Huiwon, Kim Hyeseon, Kim Yeonghui, Hong Nayeong | Voice acting: Ahn Somi, Heo Min)

- Please Go Away (19 June 2016 – 8 January 2017)

(Korean: 님은 딴 곳에, Starring: Lee Hyeonjeong, Ryu Jeongnam, Kim Daeseong, Hong Hyeonho | Previous Appearances: Lee Seongdong, Kim Hoekyeong)

Feeling flirtatious in the bar, Lee Hyeonjeong tries to chat up different kinds of men, who are totally unfazed.

- Poisonous Things (29 June 2008 – 14 June 2009)

(Korean: 독한것들; Starring: Choi Hyojong, Jeong Beomgyun, Kwak Hangu, Oh Nami → Heo Anna)

- Poor Yeonggil (13 November 2016 – 8 January 2017)

(Korean: 억울한 영길씨, Starring: Song Yeonggil, Seo Taehun)

A series of scenarios where Song Yeonggil becomes the target of unfairness.

- Pressured Deal (15 January 2017 – 2 April 2017)

(Korean: 부담거래, Starring: Lee Suji, Seo Taehun, Park Eunyeong, Jo Jinse, Jo Raehun)

Jo Raehun's plight during investigation does not get any better when his lawyer can not get his facts straight, his mother is too nervous to help him escape, and the interrogator is his ex-girlfriend.

- Pretty! Pretty? (17 August 2014 – 14 September 2014)

(Korean: 예뻐! 예뻐?; Starring: Hong Sunmok, Kim Jaewook, Kim Seunghye)

About a guy trying to break up with his pretty but awful girlfriend. The corner starts with Carly Rae Jepsen's Call Me Maybe and includes Ladies' Code's Pretty Pretty, and Lee Kyeonghyeon & Lee Yejun's Curious About You.

Due to Ladies' Code's tragic accident that happened on September 3 (and then EunB's death), the corner was excluded from the recording (within the same day) for the Chuseok special broadcast on September 7; RiSe died hours before the actual broadcast. The skit resumed a week later (September 14) with a significant change: Ladies' Code's Pretty Pretty (which was one of the last songs performed by the girls during their shoot in Daegu for KBS's "Open Concert", a few hours before their accident) was replaced by South Korean rock band SuperKidd's SECO.

- Professional Stand-ins (18 March 2018 – 22 April 2018)

(Korean: 대행알바; Starring: Hong Hyeonho, Jeong Myeonghun, Kang Yumi, Kim Janggun, Kim Jeonghoon, Lee Sejin)

- Quadruplets and Daddy (30 November 2014 – 1 February 2015)

(Korean: 사둥이는 아빠 딸; Starring: Jeong Taeho, Heo Min, Kim Seunghye, Park Soyeong, Oh Nami)

About a father (Jeong Taeho) and his "Four Seasons" lovely quadruplets; cute Spring (Hoe Min), adorable Summer (Kim Seunghye), fresh Fall (Park Soyeong), and pretty Winter (Oh Nami). Strawberry Milk's OK as signature song.

- Quiet! (16 April 2017 – 25 June 2017)

(Korean: 조용!필, Starring: Im Jonghyeok, Jang Yunseok, Choi Jaewon, Shim Mungyu, Song Jaein)

Two university freshmen find it difficult to celebrate their settling in while sharing the room with a senior studying for his exams.

Quiz Cafe (4 June 2017 – 29 October 2017) (Korean: 퀴즈카페, Starring: Yu Minsang, Seo Taehun, Park Sora)

Yu Minsang tries to win prize money by answering impossible questions.

- R-Point (18 January 2015 – 12 July 2015)

(Korean: 알포인트 (R-Point); Starring: Lee Dongyun, Lee Sejin, Jeong Myeonghun, Lee Suji, Yun Hanmin | Previous Appearances: Kim Janggun, Kim Jimin)

Parody of the famous Korean horror movie R-Point. About a platoon which is starting to go crazy after 134 days of isolation. Lee Dongyun and Lee Sejin as the only normal soldiers. Kim Janggun as a soldier who is going crazy. Jeong Myeonghun as an elite medical crew who can not remember things. Kim Jimin as a crazy ghost. Yun Hanmin as a colonel who easily gives up. Lee Suji as a seller.

- Rambling Man (7 April 2001 – 29 September 2002)

(Korean: 수다맨; Starring: Kang Seongbeom, Kim Jihye, Park Eunbin)

- Rankings Outside the Rankings (19 November 2017 – 18 March 2018)

(Korean: 순위 밖 순위; Starring: Yang Seon-il, Park So-ra, Seo Tae-hun, Park So-yeong, Yoon Seung-hyeon)

- Reaction League Baseball (9 August 2015 – 1 November 2015)

(Korean: 리액션 야구단; Starring: Kwon Jae-kwan, Jeong Jaehyeong, Kim Kiri, Kim Seongwon, Seo Namyong, Oh Nami, Lee Hyeonjeong, Byeon Seungyun, Lee Gwangseop, Yun Seunghyeon, Song Pilgeun, Im Woo-il, Lee Chan, Kwak Beom, Kim Jaewook, Yu Inseok, Kim Hyeongi, Kim Jiho | Previous Appearances: Shim Mungyu, Bok Hyeonkyu, Jo Suyeon, Lee Yerim, Park Bomi, Song Junseok)

Gagmen score points with the audience by succeeding at various impressions. On 20 September 2015, actress Park Junkeum appeared as a guest for Chuseok special as 'Drama Mother'.

- Real Modern Dictionary (16 December 2012 – 1 September 2013)

(Korean: 현대 레알 사전; Starring: Lee Huigyeong, Park Yeongjin, Jeong Beomgyun, Song Wangho)

An interactive dictionary which defines words in multiple perspectives.

- Real Sound (30 August 2015 – 12 June 2016)

(Korean: 리얼 사운드; Starring: Kim Daeseong, Yu Minsang | Previous Appearance: Im Jaebaek)

Frequently used onomatopoeia to be changed to become more detailed and real. On 20 September 2015, announcer Kim Beomsu appeared as a guest for Chuseok special.

- Real Talk Show (24 March 2013 – 19 May 2013)

(Korean: 리얼토크쇼; Starring: Hwang Hyeonhui, Lee Suji, Jeong Jimin, Shin Jongryeong, Ryu Geunil, Jeong Chanmin, Namgung Gyeongho, Oh Gihwan, Jeong Yunho, Shin Yunseung)

Guest List
1. 24 March 2013 – Comedian Kim Jun-hyun
2. 31 March 2013 – Actor Oh Ji-ho
3. 7 April 2013 – Singer K.Will
4. 14 April 2013 – Actor Lee Jong-won
5. 21 April 2013 – Rapper Simon Dominic
6. 28 April 2013 – Actor Kim Yeongho
7. 5 May 2013 – Singer and Actor Seo In-guk
8. 12 May 2013 – Actress Jeon Sukyeong
9. 19 May 2013 – Shinhwa
- Real Soap Opera (10 April 2016 – 22 May 2016)

(Korean: 클라이막장, Starring: Kim Daeseong, Kim Nahui, Kwon Jae-kwan, Lee Changyun, Yang Sangguk, Song Yeonggil, Jo Suyeon, Lee Suji | Previous Appearances: Kim Jeonghun, Kim Minkyeong, Park Jiseon)

Things that happen during a regular script reading of a soon-to-be makjang (soap opera) drama, mocking broadcast stations' use of product placement that make no sense, problems with drama writers, and more. This is a parody of the production of Korean drama Princess Aurora and writer Im Seong-han.

- Reali-T (4 December 2011 – 5 February 2012)

(Korean: 리얼리T; Starring: Kim Kiri, Seo Taehun)

Comparing drama scenes with reality.

- Reality in Action (13 June 2004 – 4 July 2004)

(Korean: 액션리얼리티; Starring: Hwang Hyeonhui, Ahn Sangtae, Kim Daebeom)

- Released (16 August 2015 – 13 September 2015)

(Korean: 출소; Starring: Kim Jeonghun, Kim Kiyeol, Song Jaein, Yang Seonil, Jang Kiyeong, Kim Jiho, Jeong Haecheol, Hong Seonghyeon)

Convict 8826 Kim Kiyeol is released on a special pardon after being imprisoned unjustly for 10 years; but he violates the law as soon as he is released in front of the security and is taken back to prison.

- Reveal the Story (23 March 2014. – 24 August 2014)

(Korean: 사건의 전말; Starring: Park Yeongjin, Kim Huiwon, Jang Yuhwan, Jang Kiyeong, Kim Jaewook, Kim Jimin)

About detectives who are investigating a crime scene, and they have to deal with crazy people who claims to be witnesses of the crime. Bonggu and Janggu (Jang Yuhwan and Jang Kiyeong) are kids who gets distracted when giving claims. Mr. K (Kim Jaewook) possesses psychometry, the extra-sensoral ability to get information and see things from the past when touching an object. Jimin always seems to say something that makes sense, but it turns out she is slurring words, and in later episodes she appears shockingly in and out of random places.

- Revenge (13 October 2002 – 12 January 2003)

(Korean: 복수; Starring: Park Seongho, Lee Byeongjin, Choi Huiseon)

- Rich Diary (4 May 2003 – 12 October 2003)

(Korean: 부자일기; Starring: Jang Ung, Lee Deokjae)

- Romantic Assassin (26 August 2007 – 23 September 2007)

(Korean: 낭만자객; Starring: Hong Sunmok, Kim Byungman, Kim Sideok)

- Rookie News (15 December 2013 – 9 March 2014)

(Korean: 초보뉴스; Starring: Kim Daehui, Kim Hoekyeong, Jeong Yunho, Yang Sangguk, Kim Wonhyo)

Rookie announcers who mess up their first time news broadcasts to the embarrassment of a veteran senior.

- Rules of the Workplace (11 November 2012 – 10 March 2013)

(Korean: 갑을컴퍼니; Starring: Yu Inseok, Hong Ingyu, Kim Jincheol, Kim Jiho, Choi Hyojong, Kim Junho, Lee Wongu)

- Say it! Yes or No (5 April 2015 – 27 December 2015)

(Korean: 말해 Yes or No; Starring: Kim Kiri, Seo Taehun, Song Pilgeun, Kim Seongwon)

A skit to prove that we are all one through memories and experiences.

- Say Anything Festival (26 March 2017 – 11 February 2018)

(Korean: 아무말 대잔치; Starring: Jang Kiyeong, Park Yeongjin, Hong Hwon, Shin Jongryeong, Song Junseok, etc.)

The contest that allows you to say anything. Contestants usually say the opposite of what one would expect them to say based on the context.

- School Meeting (1 April 2012 – 10 June 2012)

(Korean: 교무회의; Starring: Kim Daeseong, Kim Kiyeol, Lee Jonghun, Song Jungeun, Yang Sangguk, Park Yeongjin)

- School Of Mental Breakdown (24 June 2012 – 24 February 2013)

(Korean: 멘붕스쿨; Starring: Hwang Hyeonhui → Song Jungeun, Hong Nayeong, Park Soyeong, Seo Taehun, Byeon Seungyun, Jeong Seunghwan, Kim Jaewook, Kim Seongwon, Park Seongho)

- Secretly Dating (21 September 2014 – 12 April 2015)

(Korean: 은밀하게 연애하게; Starring: Yang Seonil, Kim Kiyeol, Park Bomi, Im Jonghyeok, Seo Taehun, Jang Kiyeong | Previous Appearances: Jeong Seunghwan, Kim Jimin, Kim Daeseong)

The title of the skit is a parody of 2013 action comedy movie Secretly, Greatly. The corner is about two detectives in violent crimes division who are secretly dating.

- Selfish Patent Office (29 January 2012 – 22 July 2012)

(Korean: 이기적인 특허소 (이특); Starring: Park Yeongjin, Park Seongkwang, Lee Gwangseop, Kim Seongwon, Kim Taewon, Ahn Somi, Lee Munjae)

- Senile Chairman Hwang (13 April 2008 – 28 December 2008)

(Korean: 많이컸네 황회장; Starring: Hwang Hyeonhui, Kim Junhyeon, Lee Gwangseop, Kim Kiyeol)

- Seoul Mate (10 July 2011 – 5 February 2012)

(Korean: 서울메이트; Starring: Yang Sangguk, Heo Kyung-hwan, Ryu Jeongnam, Park Sora)

- Serious Kingdom (19 July 2015 – 20 November 2016)

(Korean: 진지록; Starring: Lee Dongyun, Lee Sejin, Jeong Myeonghun, Kim Junho, Kim Janggun, Kim Taewon)

King Serious tries to discover the man who has been making people laugh despite the kingdom's ban on laughter. His interrogation process tests the humor of suspected subjects by making them come up with acrostic poems.

- Sha Wujing and Friends (27 June 2004 – 31 October 2004)

(Korean: 사대천왕; Starring: Kwon Jinyeong, Kim Jincheol, Hong Ingyu)

- She Was Pretty (15 November 2015 –12 June 2016)

(Korean: 그녀는 예뻤다; Starring: Ahn Ilgwon, Oh Nami, Heo Min)

A story about tsundere Ahn Ilgwon's love for Oh Nami.

- Sheer Force (15 September 2002 – 31 August 2003)

(Korean: 우격다짐; Starring: Lee Jeongsu)

- Silly Interview (1 October 2017 – 5 November 2017)

(Korean: 잉? 터뷰, Starring: Kim Taewon, Song Jeungeun, Kang Yumi, Park Soyoung, Song Byeongcheol, Im Wooil, Kim Jeonghoon)

- SISTAR29 (16 June 2013 – 29 September 2013)

(Korean: 씨스타29; Starring: Park Jisun, Oh Nami, Song Byeongcheol)

A parody of unit sub-group SISTAR19, composed of 29-year-old women lounging at a bar and imitating the intro choreography of Gone Not Around Any Longer. They blame everything, from being passed over CF deals, to celebrities "less beautiful than them", to their single status, on the "curse of the nines".

- Small Time Crooks (21 October 2012 – 25 November 2012)

(Korean: 좀도둑들; Starring: Kim Daehui, Park Sora, Kim Jonghun, Lee Sanghun, Park Yeongjin, Kwak Beom, Shin Yunseung)

- Snap Martial Arts (5 February 2012 – 2 December 2012)

(Korean: 꺾기도; Starring: Kim Junho, Hong Ingyu, Jang Kiyeong, Jo Yunho, Lee Sangho, Lee Sangmin, Yu Minsang)

A martial arts school that teaches the art of "snapping" words – by continuing a sentence by giving the last word of the sentence a new meaning. On 28 May 2017, the skit returned for the Gag Concert 900th Episode Special (Part 1) and members of 2 Days & 1 Night Defconn, Kim Jong-min, and Jung Joon-young appeared as guests.

- Solutions to Iffy Issues (21 August 2011 – 13 May 2012)

(Korean: 애매한 것을 정해주는 남자 (애정남); Starring: Ryu Geunji, Choi Hyojong, Lee Wongu, Shin Jongryeong)

- Sorry, Bro (1 June 2014 – 24 August 2014)

(Korean: 미안해요 형; Starring: Hong Sunmok, Lee Sanggu, Kwak Beom, Jeong Yunho)

About a boss and his new part-timers who keep driving him crazy.

- Sound of Drama (27 March 2011 – 31 July 2011)

(Korean: 사운드 오브 드라마; Starring: Yu Minsang, Byeon Seungyun, Heo Anna)

- Spear and Shield (12 February 2017 – 25 June 2017)

(Korean: 창과 방패, Starring: Lee Sanghun, Jang Yunseok, Kim Byeong-seon)

Two salespersons compete to sell their conflicting products, making the passengers on the metro react to them. But when it is down to the last person – who has both products on – his reaction is a peculiar one. On 21 May 2017, rhythmic gymnast Shin Soo-ji appeared as a guest for the Gag Concert 900th Episode Special (Part 2). On 28 May 2017, idol Jeon So-mi appeared on the skit as guests for the Gag Concert 900th Episode Special (Part 3).

- Steal the Spotlight (27 July 2014 – 10 August 2014)

(Korean: 날 보러 와요; Starring: Im Jaebaek, Park Eunyeong, Lee Seongdong, Kwon Jae-kwan, Im Woo-il, Jeong Haecheol)

About an acting crew who spoil the script to attract attention with their exaggerated acting skills, just for the taste of the spotlight.

- Still Alive (19 May 2013 – 14 July 2013)

(Korean: 살아있네; Starring: Choi Hyojong, Hong Sunmok, Yun Hyeongbin, Song Wangho)

A parody of the movie Nameless Gangster: Rules of the Time in terms of the mafia family and attempts of finding solutions to problems through connections.

- Stockholm Syndrome (10 May 2015 – 1 November 201)

(Korean: 스톡홀름 신드롬; Starring: Jeong Yunho, Lee Suji, Park Seongkwang, Lee Sanghun)

A thief attacking bank employees, and asks them to act out to cover for him when he gets a phone call from his mother or girlfriend. Read more: Stockholm syndrome.

- Strongest Mentality (20 July 2014 – 28 September 2014)

(Korean: 멘탈 갑 (甲); Starring: Park Seongkwang, Lee Sanghun, Yang Seonil, Ryu Geunil, Hong Yeseul, Kim Byeong-seon, Park Seongho (Class 28), Jo Seunghui)

A corner to save weak-minded people from mental breakdown.

- Stubborn (25 January 2015 – 2015.11.15)

(Korean: 고집불통; Starring: Song Pilgeun, Im Woo-il, Kim Kiri, Kim Taewon, Park Seongho (28), Lee Seongdong | Previous Appearance: Park Yeongjin)

About a tenant struggling from a stubborn building's security guard and the old men living around. On 31 May 2015, Big Tide cheering group appeared in the skit.

- Sudden Appearances (27 November 2016 – 5 March 2017)

(Korean: 나타나, Starring: Hwang Jeonghye, Lee Sejin, Kim Seunghye, Kim Hoekyeong, Bang Juho, Jang Hana, Bae Jeonggeun, Park Jinho, Song Yeonggil, Jeong Jinyeong)

About situations that appear as a surprise in a setting. Skit title was previously 'Surprise Appearances' on KBS World.

- Sunny Days of Youth (30 November 2014 – 11 January 2015)

(Korean: 젊은이의 양지; Starring: Lee Chan, Kim Wonhyo, Lee Munjae)

About three friends, one rich, one poor and one getting by who are struggling from the same thing in a different way.

- Supernatural (25 October 2015 – 7 February 2016)

(Korean: 초능력자; Starring: Kim Janggun, Kwak Beom, Park Sora, Song Yeonggil, Lee Changho, Jeong Taeho | Previous Appearances: Kim Min-hee)

- Suppress It (6 October 2013 – 13 October 2013)

(Korean: 견뎌; Starring: Park Yeongjin, Kim Kiyeol, Kwon Jae-kwan, Jo Suyeon, Hong Hwon, Kim Jeonghun)

- Survival Dialect (13 October 2002 – 15 February 2004)

(Korean: 박준형의 생활사투리; Starring: Park Junhyeong, Jeong Jongcheol, Kim Sideok, Lee Jaehun)

- Super Fatty-man (4 June 2017 – 30 July 2017)

(Korean: 힘을 내요! 슈퍼 뚱맨, Starring: Yu Minsang, Song Jungeun, Jo Jinse)

Super Fatty-man Yu Minsang is the protagonist who will take out the villain Song Jungeun (Zero-X). But Yu Minsang becomes the villain instead when the villain looks like the victim instead.

- Sweet Potato (24 June 2018– 9 September)

(Korean: 고구마 Starring: Jang Yoon-seok, Im Jong-hyeok, Choi Jae-won)

- Take Advantage (10 November 2013 – 2 February 2014)

(Korean: 누려; Starring: Park Jisun, Lee Huigyeong, Kim Huiwon, Jang Yuhwan, Yu Minsang)

About a nouveau riches couple and daughter-in-law trying to take advantage of their new-found wealth in every situation while still unconsciously acting like their old way of life.

- Take Martial Arts (21 January 2007 – 12 August 2007)

(Korean: 같기道 or 같기도; Starring: Kim Junho, Lee Sangu, Hong Ingyu, Park Seongho, Lee Sangmin, Lee Sangho)

Kim Junho is a Take martial artist who's teaching the art of doing something that's neither this nor that.

- Talaktubbies (21 March 2004 – 18 July 2004)

(Korean: 타락토비; Starring: Im Hyeokpil, Kim Inseok, Jeong Myeonghun, Heo Seungjae)

- Teacher Kang's Dressing Room (22 February 2009 – 13 September 2009)

(Korean: 분장실의 강 선생님; Starring: Kim Kyeong-ah, Jeong Gyungmi, Kang Yumi, Ahn Yeongmi)

Kang Yumi teaches her fellow junior comedians about dress up. On 21 May 2017, the skit returned for the Gag Concert 900th Episode Special (Part 2).

- Team Name: Jinx (8 January 2012 – 15 January 2012)

(Korean: 팀을 위한 길; Starring: Lee Jonghun, Kim Kiyeol, Kim Jincheol, Jeong Myeonghun, Yang Seonil)

- Tell Them (9 February 2014 – 22 June 2014)

(Korean: 그래 그래; Starring: Noh Ujin, Song Pilgeun, Kim Jeonghun, Song Wangho, Lee Sanggu)

About a stubborn gang leader and his subordinate and how they deal with the police when their crimes are discovered using mindless excuses.

- Thank You (14 August 2011 – 10 June 2012)

(Korean: 감사합니다; Starring: Jeong Taeho, Song Byeongcheol, Lee Sanghun)

Musical comedy.

- That's Okay, That's Okay (30 July 2017 – 20 August 2017)

(Korean: 괜찮아 괜찮아, Starring: Lee Sangho, Lee Sangmin, Lee Sejin, Kim Jeonghun)

- The Animals (6 January 2013 – 19 May 2013)

(Korean: 애니뭘; Starring: Jeong Beomgyun, Ryu Jeongnam, Jo Jihun, Kim Wonhyo, Park Seongho, Kim Junho)

- The Big Arrest (29 July 2012 – 7 October 2012)

(Korean: 체포왕; Starring: Park Yeongjin, Kim Jangkun, Lee Seongdong, Kim Jeonghun, Lee Suji, Hong Nayeong)

- The Big World (29 June 2014 – 7 December 201)

(Korean: 큰 세계; Starring: Kim Junhyeon, Song Yeonggil, Yu Minsang, Kim Soo-yeong, Kim Taewon. Skinny guys: Jeong Jinyeong, Choi Jaewon, Kim Hyeongi, Seo Namyong)

The title of the skit is a parody of 2013 crime movie New World (신세계). In the year 2094, due to the exhaustion of food, the human race is about to die off. The survivors made their own underground world with their own rules; being fat means power, authority, honor and wealth, only fat people rule this world. All comedians starring in this corner are overweight, and they compete on who weigh more by showing off their characteristics and eating ability. On 7 September 2014, SISTAR appeared as guests for the Chuseok special.

- The Blame Game (27 May 2012 – 1 July 2012)

(Korean: 하극상; Starring: Kim Wonhyo, Jeong Beomgyun, Choi Hyojong)

- The Boy Band or Jeon Guk Gu (9 December 2012 – 1 September 2013)

(Korean: 전국구; Starring: Lee Gwangseop, Lee Jonghun, Lee Sangmin, Lee Sangho, Kim Kiri)

Musical comedy; songs about different fashions in an exaggerated way. The band released an album (Fashion City) in 2013.

- The Bufferings (9 December 2007 – 30 March 2008)

(Korean: 버퍼링스; Starring: Ahn Yoon-sang, Eom Taegyeong)

Musical comedy; the name of the skit refers to buffering a video online. The skit includes repetition, freezing, and looping as some of the problems that may actually play out when loading a video with a slow internet connection. The duo made an appearance in the 700th episode of Gag Concert on "GagConcert Star KBS".

- The Demon (28 February 2016 – 6 November 2016)

(Korean: 아재씨, Starring: Park Yeongjin, Song Wangho, Im Jaebaek, Shim Mungyu, Jang Hana | Previous appearances: Hong Hyeonho, Jang Yuhwan, Jeong Yunho, Jo Suyeon, Kim Min-hee, Im Jonghyuk)

A middle-aged demon possesses someone, who starts spouting his bad puns and does his 'ahjussi-like' behaviour. Two exorcists seek to expel him.

- The Elder (22 July 2012 – 27 January 2013)

(Korean: 어르신; Starring: Kim Daehui, Lee Munjae, Kim Wonhyo, Ryu Jeongnam, Jeong Myeonghun)

The wise elders of the countryside have a chat. On 28 May 2017, the skit returned for the Gag Concert 900th Episode Special (Part 1).

- The Escape (18 September 2016 – 1 January 2017)

(Korean: 나가거든, Starring: Hong Hyeonho, Lee Hyeonjeong, Lee Sanghun, Lee Changho, Yun Seunghyeon, Jeong Seungbin)

Parody of Korean survival movie The Tunnel. Hong Hyeonho is stuck in the collapsed tunnel, but funny things happen over the phone while waiting for help.

- The Family Head (10 August 2014 – 15 February 2015)

(Korean: 가장자리; Starring: Lee Seungyun, Seo Taehun, Lee Hyeonjeong, Park Yeongjin, Lee Changho, Park Soyeong, Kim Seongwon | Previous Appearances: Kim Seunghye, Song Yeonggil)

Conversation between neighbors (bachelor → newlywed [201], married [202], lonely father [203], bachelor [301] → married deputy [302]) on the balcony.

- The Female Comedian (15 July 2012 – 27 January 2013)

(Korean: 희극 여배우들; Starring: Ryu Geunji → Lee Huigyeong, Jeong Gyeongmi, Heo Anna → Kim Yeonghui, Park Jisun)

- The Girl That Used to be Pretty (29 April 2018 – 3 June 2018)

(Korean: 밥 잘 사주는 예뻤던 누나; Starring: Im Seongwook, Kim Nina etc.)

On June 1, 2018, Seolhyun (AOA) made a special appearance, promoting their single Bingle Bangle.

- The King Game (24 November 2013 – 5 January 2014)

(Korean: 왕게임; Starring: Kim Jeonghun, Noh Ujin, Jang Kiyeong, Kim Kiyeol, Park Yeongjin)

An interactive game where the viewers can vote through SMS in which one of the four representatives are more fitting in a given situation.

- The King of Ratings (21 April 2013 – 6 July 2014)

(Korean: 시청률의 제왕; Starring: Park Seongkwang, Lee Sanghun, Heo Anna, Kim Taewon, Ryu Geunji, Yang Seonil, Kim Hoekyeong, Oh Gihwan | Semi-fixed cast: Lee Huigyeong, Hong Nayeong)

In essence a parody of SBS's The King of Dramas, this skit parodies common methods (makjang plotlines, character insertion & write-offs, utilization of idol actors, and obvious yet senseless PPLs) overly used by producers in order to raise their ratings as represented by a real-time ratings graph.

- The Love of Slaves (2 December 2012 – 20 January 2013)

(Korean: 노애; Starring: Heo Anna, Song Yeonggil, Jeong Jinyeong, Jeong Seunghwan, Lee Huigyeong, Park Eunyeong)

- The Most Sensitive People (4 September 2016 – 25 June 2017)

(Korean: 세젤예 (세상에서 제일 예민한 사람들), Starring: Yu Minsang, Song Jungeun, Lee Suji, Im Woo-il | Previous appearances: Song Wangho, Kim Seunghye)

Waiter Yu Minsang and his encounters with various overly sensitive patrons. On 28 May 2017, Kim Jong-min appeared as a guest for the Gag Concert 900th Episode Special (Part 1). On 28 May 2017, rapper DinDin and singer-actress Solbi appeared on the skit as guests for the Gag Concert 900th Episode Special (Part 3).

- The Participation Show (15 October 2018 – 13 May 2019)

(Korean: 올라옵 Show; Starring: Song Yeong-gil, Seo Tae-hun, Kim Seong-won, Ryu Geun-ji,| Voiceover: Oh Na-mi)

- The Perfect Couple (11 October 2015 – 31 January 2016)

(Korean: 환상의 커플; Starring: Ryu Geunji, Park Sora, Im Jaebaek, Kim Seunghye, Jeong Yunho | Previous Appearances: Lee Changyun)

- The Pursuer (15 July 2012 – 2 September 2012)

(Korean: 추·남; Starring: Choi Hyojong, Jeong Beomgyun, Lee Sanghun, Hong Hwon)

- The Royal Family (9 November 2008 – 28 December 2008)

(Korean: 로열 패밀리; Starring: Jang Doyeon, Kim Kyeong-ah, Han Mingwan, Song Byeongcheol)

- The Secret Life of Lee Chan (8 March 2015 – 15 March 2015)

(Korean: 이찬의 상상은 현실이 된다; Starring: Lee Chan, Im Woo-il, Kim Yeonghui, Oh Nami, Park Jisun)

About Lee Chan, an employee that uses his imagination to revenge the arrogant Im Woo-il. The English title is based on the film The Secret Life of Walter Mitty.

- The Set-up (28 January 2018 – 22 April 2018)

(Korean: 구린라이트; Starring: Jeong Seunghwan, Jeong Seungbin, Kim Hyeseon, Kim Seunghye)

- The Third World (11 September 2005 – 29 January 2006)

(Korean: 제3세계; Starring: Park Seongho, Park Hwi-sun, Kim Daebeom)

- The Three Friends (25 August 2013 – 22 June 2014)

(Korean: 놈놈놈; Starring: Song Pilgeun, Ahn Somi, Bok Hyeonkyu, Kim Kiri, Yu Inseok, Ryu Geunji)

Remake of 'Love Artistestes' from 'The Gag Concert You've Never Seen Before' 2013's Chuseok Special. About three handsome friends (plus random handsome all-around stranger) that keep interrupting Pilgeun's dates with his girlfriend. The corner starts with NC.A's Oh My God.

- The Three Idiots (7 April 2002 – 12 January 2003)

(Korean: 바보삼대; Starring: Kim Junho, Kim Daehui, Lee Taesik)

- The Tigress Sisters (17 June 2012 – 24 June 2012)

(Korean: 호랭이 언니들; Starring: Lee Suji, Song Yeonggil, Heo Min, Hong Nayeong, Kim Jaewook, Kim Kyeong-ah, Hong Sunmok)

- The Tired Family (8 July 2012 – 2 September 2012)

(Korean: 피곤한 가족; Starring: Kim Jaewook, Kim Minkyeong, Lee Sangmin, Lee Sangho, Kim Daehui, Lee Dongyun → Lee Seungyun, Kim Taewon, Park Soyeong → Kim Hyeseon, Heo Min)

- The Uncomfortable Truth (10 July 2011 – 21 July 2013)

(Korean: 불편한 진실; Starring: Hwang Hyeonhui, Jeong Jimin, Kim Kiri, Kim Jimin, Jeong Eunseon, Park Jisun, Kim Minkyeong, Jang Kiyeong)

Analyzing overly-clichéd storylines and pointing out their flaws.

- The Way Home (4 July 2004 – 10 September 2006)

(Korean: 집으로; Starring: Kim Junho, Hong Ingyu, Kim Daehui)

- The Whistleblower (7 October 2012 – 16 December 2012)

(Korean: 막말자; Starring: Hwang Hyeonhui, Jeong Eunseon, Kim Hyeseon, Jeong Jimin)

- The Yellow Sea (26 May 2013 – 25 May 2014)

(Korean: 황해; Starring: Lee Suji, Jeong Chanmin, Shin Yunseung, Lee Sanggu, Hong Ingyu, Hong Sunmok)

A funny parody of The Yellow Sea (film with the same name). Voice phishing and scamming attempts. This skit took 2013's Top Excellence Award for Idea.

- The Young King (10 March 2013 – 12 May 2013)

(Korean: 왕해; Starring: Lee Gwangseop, Lee Dongyun, Kim Daeseong, Ryu Geunil, Lee Seungyun, Yang Seonil, Jeong Myeonghun, Shin Goeun)

A loose parody of Gwanghae; it is about a king constantly being underestimated by everyone around him (from his ministers to his generals) on account of his young age.

- This Thing Called Love (13 May 2012 – 1 July 2013)

(Korean: 이 죽일놈의 사랑; Starring: Park Jisun, Kim Daeseong, Park Sora)

- Three People, Three Colours (15 July 2007 – 21 October 2007)

(Korean: 삼인삼색; Starring: Jang Hyoin, Heo Miyeong, Park Jisun)

Debut skit for the starring cast; appeared in the skit "Gag Warrior 300" alongside their 22nd class comedians.

- Through the Ranks (14 February 2016 – 10 July 2016)

(Korean: 넘사벽, Starring: Jeong Taeho, Lee Changho, Kwak Beom, Lee Munjae | Previous Appearances: Jo Chunghyeon, Jeong Seunghwan, Song Yeonggil)

About gangsters with zero loyalty for their boss.

- Time Travel (30 May 2010 – 26 December 2010)

(Korean: 시간여행; Starring: Jeong Taeho, Yang Seonil, Jang Doyeon, Lee Sangmin, Lee Sangho)

- Torch Together (26 July 2015 – 31 January 2016)

(Korean: 횃불 투게더; Starring: Song Wangho, Jeong Beomgyun, Song Pilgeun, Lee Hyeonjeong, Oh Gihwan, Heo Min, Jeong Jinyeong, Song Junseok)

Old university friends who would use any excuse to do a protesting campaign. On 20 September 2015, singer Park Wan-kyu appeared as a guest for Chuseok special.

- Tour Guides (7 June 2015 – 12 July 2015)

(Korean: 대륙의 별; Starring: Jeong Seunghwan, Byeon Seungyun, Park Eunyeong, Park Seongho (13) | Previous Appearance: Noh Ujin)

About an angry tourist and crazy tour guides.

- Trend Show (15 May 2011 – 17 July 2011)

(Korean: 트렌드 쇼, Starring: Choi Hyojong, Ryu Geunji, Lee Sanghun, Park Sora, Hong Hwon, Jeong Haecheol, Ryu Geunil)

Trend-setter Choi Hyojong tells viewers how to set their own trends.

- Trouble Maker (19 June 2016 – 14 August 2016)

(Korean: 테러블 메이커, Starring: Park Yeongjin, Lee Munjae, Jeong Jimin, Park Jiseon, Lee Sanghun, Jang Hyoin, Heo Min | Previous Appearances: Shim Mungyu, Jo Chunghyeon, Kim Seunghye)

A counter-terrorist team has arrived to eradicate the "terrors" found in the city, such as mothers-in-law, nosey siblings, and middle-aged ladies in public.

- True Colors of The Master (16 November 2014 – 15 March 2015)

(Korean: 명인본색 (名人本色); Starring: Im Jaebaek, Lee Sanggu, Jeong Yunho, Lee Hyeonjeong)

About the service at a Japanese restaurant. Lee Hyeonjeong stars as the owner of the restaurant, with her catchphrase as "몸이 약해서" (I'm not feeling very well). On 28 December 2014, Sayuri appeared as guest for new year special.

- Tutor of Terror (10 August 2003 – 2 November 2003)

(Korean: 공포의 과외선생; Starring: Kim Byungman, Yun Seokju, Yun Seongho)

- Ugly Inside (25 March 2018 – 5 August 2018)

(Korean: 뷰티 잉 사이드; Starring: Kang Yu-mi, Park Hwi-sun, Song Byeong-cheol, Kwak Beom, Song Yeong-gil, Yoo Min-sang)

- Underpaid (18 June 2017 – 13 August 2017)

(Korean: 일당BACK, Starring: Kim Kiyeol, Song Yeonggil, Jeong Seunghwan, Kwak Beom, Im Woo-il, Lee Sejin)

General Kim Kiyeol sends his men to war, but some reluctant ones remain behind to avoid participating in the war.

- Uninvited Guests (7 January 2007 – 15 July 2007)

(Korean: 불청객들; Starring: Ryu Dam, Jo Suwon, Kim Byungman, Jeong Jongcheol, Song Byeongcheol, Kwak Hyeonha)

- Unpretty Competition (29 March 2015)

(Korean: 언프리티 컴피티션; Starring: Lee Sejin, Park Eunyeong, Kim Nina, Heo Anna, Kim Yeonghui)

Trial at hip hop court. Parody of hip-hop competition Unpretty Rapstar.

- Unstoppable Interviewer Mr. Byeon (26 December 2010 – 3 April 2011)

(Korean: 못말리는 변접관; Starring: Byeon Kisu, Jang Donghyeok, Song Yeonggil, Kim Huiwon)

- Veteran (20 September 2015 – 12 June 2016)

(Korean: 베테랑; Starring: Kim Hoekyeong, Im Jonghyeok, Shim Mungyu, Park Sora | Previous Appearance: Song Jaein, Ahn Somi)

A play in which the sound effects man is absent so the veterans decided to take his place. However they caused the sound effects to be out of sync with their actions on stage, leading them to ad-lib their lines and actions to accommodate the sound effects, thus changing the play's plot.

- Viewer's Opinion (26 October 2014 – 15 February 2015)

(Korean: 시청자 의견; Starring: Jeong Jaehyeong, Yun Seunghyeon, Lee Sangeun, Kim Seunghye, Choi Jaewon)

Comparing drama scenes with reality.

- Wait Wolf (13 January 2013 – 17 February 2013)

(Korean: 기다려 늑대; Starring: Ryu Geunji, Kim Hyeseon, Seo Namyong, Song Yeonggil)

A parody of A Werewolf Boy.

- Wanted to Try (15 January 2017)

(Korean: 해보고 싶었습니다, Starring: Lee Dongyun, Im Woo-il, Im Jonghyeok, Kim Jiho, Hong Seonghyeon)

When Korea's crime rate is so low, policemen do not know what to do when they face a criminal.

- War on Broadcasting (25 March 2012 – 13 May 2012)

(Korean: 방송과의 전쟁; Starring: Kim Daebeom, Ahn Ilgwon, Byeon Seungyun, Park Seongho, Kim Hyeseon, Kim Jangkun)

- We Are Buds (13 April 2003 – 6 July 2003)

(Korean: 우리들은 새싹들이다; Starring: Im Hyeokpil, Kim Kisu, Kwon Jinyeong)

- We Are One (24 June 2012 – 8 July 2012)

(Korean: 팀을 위한 길; Starring: Im Woo-il, Kim Kiri, Seo Taehun, Lee Seongdong)

- We Can Pretend (17 February 2013 – 31 March 2013)

(Korean: 위캔척; Starring: Choi Hyojong, Park Soyeong, Hong Sunmok, Jeong Haecheol)

- We Need Communication (19 November 2006 – 30 November 2008)

(Korean: 대화가 필요해; Starring: Kim Daehui, Jang Dongmin, Shin Bongseon)

A skit about the dinnertime of a family that consists of a strict father, a loving mother, and a rebellious son. For the Gag Concert 700th Episode Special, Kim Kiri took over Jang Dongmin's role as the son, though in respect to the original roles, he was cast as Dongmin's younger brother who is serving his mandatory military service. On 20 December 2015, the skit returned during the skit '301 302' for the Alumni Special. On 28 May 2017, the skit returned for the Gag Concert 900th Episode Special (Part 1).

- We Need to Talk 1987 (9 July 2017 – 10 June 2018)

(Korean: 대화가 필요해 1987; Starring: Kim Daehui, Shin Bongseon, Lee Sejin, Lee Hyeonjeong, Jang Dongmin)

The prequel to the long-running skit We Need Communication. It tells the story of how Kim Daehui and Shin Bongseon met. Jang Dongmin's comeback after 8 years of not appearing on Gag Concert.

- Webtoon (19 July 2015 – 2 August 2015)

(Korean: 기승전병; Starring: Kim Hyeongi, Lee Munjae, Im Jonghyeok, Ryu Jeongnam, Jo Chunghyeon, Lee Sangeun)

An illustration of comics.

- Wedding (13 March 2016)

(Korean: 왜딩, Starring: Park Yeongjin, Song Wangho, Kim Hyeongi, Kim Janggun, Jeong Jimin, Jo Suyeon)

Marrying inanimate objects is possible.

- Welcome Back Show (3 January 2016 – 1 May 2016)

(Korean: 웰컴 백 쇼; Starring: Song Byeongcheol, Kim Junho, Yu Minsang, Lee Sangmin, Lee Sangho | Previous appearances: Kim Jiho)

A show that welcomes the viewers back in three segments. Richard Kim (Kim Junho) faces challenges to win one million dollars, Yu Minsang parodies Bob Ross, and twins Lee Sangho and Lee Sangmin are testing dummies for the viewers' questions.

List of Challenges by Richard Kim
Challenges:
1. 3 January 2016: Eating 100 hot dogs
2. 10 January 2016: Drinking whiskey shots quickly
3. 17 January 2016: Cracking many walnuts with bare hands
4. 24 January 2016: Memorising animals by their numbers
5. 31 January 2016: Staying on ice for as long as possible
6. 7 February 2016: Breaking many eggs with his forehead
7. 14 February 2016: Not making any sound at all
8. 21 February 2016: Not closing his eyes at all
9. 28 February 2016: Eating stuff in 10 seconds
10. 6 March 2016: Guessing what an item is just by touching
11. 13 March 2016: Testing his supernatural powers
12. 20 March 2016: Winning against machines
13. 3 April 2016: Avoiding everything
14. 10 April 2016: Doing stuff after spinning around 10 times
15. 17 April 2016: Genius test
16. 24 April 2016: Food fighter
17. 1 May 2016: Strong man challenge
- Welcome to Korea (4 October 2015 – 31 January 2016)

(Korean: 웰컴 투 코리아; Starring: Song Jungeun, Jeong Haecheol, Lee Hyeonjeong, Hong Hyeonho)

Advice to would-be tourists to Korea with observations about life in Korea, and useful language tips you would not normally find in tourist phrasebooks.

- What If (6 October 2002 – 1 December 2002)

(Korean: 만약에; Starring: Jang Ung, Kim Junho)

- Who's Recording? (23 April 2017 – 25 June 2017)

(Korean: 누가 녹음, Starring: Kwak Beom, Jeong Haecheol, Jo Jinse)

Singer Kwak Beom is recording his new song, but something's not right when they check the recording.

List of Songs
1. 24 April 2017 – Flower – Endless
2. 30 April 2017 – Vibe – Drinking
3. 7 May 2017 – Kim Bum-soo – Missing You
4. 4 June 2017 – Im Chang-jung – A Shot of Soju
5. 11 June 2017 – Buzz – Travel to Me
6. 25 June 2017 – Kim Jong-kook – Lovable
- Why We Don't Need Men (12 May 2013 – 19 January 2014)

(Korean: 남자가 필요없는 이유; Starring: Hong Nayeong, Park Sora, Seo Taehun → Lee Chan, Jeong Seunghwan, Jeong Myeonghun)

Sora's stories from previous experiences in dating the worst kinds of handsome men (who are players), devoted men (who are too obsessed), and average men (who are horndogs) to explain why women do not need men.

- Wiggle Wiggle (24 May 2015 – 3 April 2016)

(Korean: 니글니글; Starring: Lee Sanghun, Song Yeonggil)

About two arrogant weirdos who dance to Jason Derulo's Wiggle. The Korean title actually means 'greasy greasy'.

- Willful Negligence (6 January 2013 – 14 April 2013)

(Korean: 미필적 고의; Starring: Park Seongkwang, Kim Wonhyo, Song Byeongcheol, Kim Daehui, Im Woo-il)

- Wonderful Days (13 July 2014 – 3 August 2014)

(Korean: 참 좋은 시절; Starring: Lee Chan, Yang Seonil, Heo Anna, Park Sora, Kim Taewon, Park Yeongjin)

The title is a parody of KBS's weekend drama Wonderful Days (참 좋은 시절). The skit is about a poor family consisting of five members, Heo Anna the mother and her brother Kim Taewon, Yang Seonil the father, Park Sora the daughter and Lee Chan the son. Park Yeongjin plays the landlady. The skit features their bedtime conversations.

- World News (23 October 2005 – 27 November 2005)

(Korean: 월드뉴스; Starring: Kim Junho, Sam Hammington)

- Yes or No (5 February 2012 – 15 April 2012)

(Korean: 있기 없기; Starring: Heo Min, Lee Munjae, Jeong Jinyeong)

- YOLO Inn (27 August 2017 – 20 May 2018)

(Korean: 욜로민박; Starring: Kim Junho, Kim Jimin, Kwon Jae-gwan, Hong Ingyu, Lee Hyo-rin, Lee Seongdong, Seo Namyong, Kim Janggun, Kim Seunghye)

On 22 April 2018, girl group Twice (Sana, Jihyo, Mina, Dahyun) made a guest appearance on the skit, promoting their new single, What is Love?.

- You Are So Bad (3 February 2013 – 28 July 2013)

(Korean: 나쁜 사람; Starring: Lee Sanggu, Lee Munjae, Yu Minsang, Lee Chan) On the 14 July 2013 episode, Heo Min appeared as Monica from the Dance Chatter skit.

- Young President (4 December 2016 – 19 February 2017)

(Korean: 대통형, Starring: Seo Taehun, Yu Minsang, Kim Daeseong, Lee Hyeonjeong, Lee Changho, Hong Hyeonho, Bok Hyeonkyu)

The skit that took over Minsang Debate 2 because director Jo Jun-hui left. In this political satire, Seo Tae-hun plays the young president while his subordinates fight amongst each other. The skit places focus on the 2016 South Korean political scandal, but also makes references to other political figures in South Korea.

- Youth White Papers (31 July 2005 – 4 June 2006)

(Korean: 청년백서; Starring: Park Junhyeong, Im Hyeokpil, Kim Sideok, Park Seongho)

- Your Beat (24 September 2006 – 22 October 2006)

(Korean: 네 박자; Starring: Kim Jin, Yun Hyeongbin, Jung Myunghun, Park Seongho, Kim Junho, Kim Sideok, Kim Dae-hui)

- Zigzag Song (28 July 2002 – 12 January 2003)

(Korean: 지그재그송; Starring: Kim Junho, Jeong Jongcheol, Kang Seongbeom)

- Zombie Project (13 October 2013 – 15 December 2013)

(Korean: 좀비 프로젝트; Starring: Kim Junho, Jeong Taeho, Kim Janggun, Kim Seongwon, Kim Nahee)

Remake of 'World War Zombie' from 'The Gag Concert You've Never Seen Before' 2013's Chuseok Special. About two zombies who groan about eating humans, but spare a beautiful woman.

- Zoom In, Zoom Out (2 October 2016 – 18 December 2016)

(Korean: 줌in줌out; Starring: Heo Min, Bok Hyeonkyu, Jang Yunseok, Kwak Beom, Yun Hanmin)

'Zoom in' to focus on a storyline told by one character, but 'zoom out' to an unexpected story.

- Zoo News (17 June 2018 – 8 July 2018)

(Korean: Zoo스 와이드; Starring: Park So-ra, Yang Seon-il, Kim Soo-yeong, Ahn Il-gwon, Lee Hyeon-jeong, Shin Yoon-seung, Kim Jang-gun)

- 억수르 (13 July 2014 – 19 October 2014)

(Korean: 억수르; Starring: Song Jungeun, Hong Hwon, Jeong Haecheol, Kim Kiyeol, Kim Minkyeong, Oh Nami)

This skit started with the title "Mansour 만수르" on 13 July 2014, but was only broadcast on KBS2 and not broadcast on KBS World's channel due to the risk of offending their international audience. Furthermore, it was reported that a complaint had been put forward – that the Korean audience may associate the name Mansour with the deputy prime minister of the UAE, Mansour bin Zayed Al Nahyan which could risk South Korea's relationship with the UAE. Hence, on 27 July 2014, the title was changed to "Eoksour 억수르"; a play on the original title (Mansour) which meant ten thousand and was upgraded to hundred million (Eoksour). On 7 September 2014, John Park appeared as a guest for Chuseok special.

== The Gag Concert You've Never Seen Before ==
=== Seollal Special (12 February 2013) ===
- 모던보이 (12 September 2012) – Kim Kiri, Seo Taehun, Park Sora, Im Woo-il
- EBS 드라마 (27 October 2010) – Shin Bora, Song Jungeun, Kim Daebeom, Kim Kiri
- 노력의 결정체 (10 October 2012) – Kwon Jae-kwan, Kim Jiho, Lee Chan, Kim Jincheol, Kim Hyeongi, Kim Kiri, Ahn Ilgwon
- Don't Give In 버티고 (23 January 2013) – Kim Jiho, Heo Anna, Ryu Jeongnam, Kim Janggun, Lee Seongdong, Kwon Jae-kwan
- 승승맞장구 (2 November 2011) – Lee Gwangseop, Kwon Jae-kwan, Jo Yunho, Yu Minsang
- 둥이 딩이 (19 September 2012) – Ahn Somi, Oh Nami, Lee Sangmin, Lee Sangho, Lee Sanghun
- 지구멸망보고서 (30 May 2012) – Seo Taehun, Park Yeongjin, Hwang Hyeonhui
- 소극장배우들 (30 November 2011) – Kim Jeonghun, Kim Taewon, Lee Munjae, Kim Kiyeol
- 배신자 (7 November 2012) – Song Byeongcheol, Kim Daeseong, Lee Seungyun
- 컴백 (20 January 2010) – Heo Kyung-hwan, Song Byeongcheol, Kim Daeseong, Kim Kiyeol
- 썬이 (17 August 2011) – Park Narae, Jang Doyeon, Kim Minkyeong, Heo Anna, Heo Kyung-hwan
- 그 들만의 스타 (9 November 2011) – Kim Yeonghui, Kwon Mijin, Park Soyeong, Kim Jimin, Im Woo-il, Heo Kyung-hwan

=== Chuseok Special (19 September 2013) ===
- Differently 달라스 (3 July 2013) – Kim Jiho, Kim Kiri, Jo Yunho, Kim Janggun
- Girls in the Army 군대 온 걸 (1 March 2013) – Kim Kyeong-ah, Jo Seunghui, Jeong Myeonghun, Park Sora, Heo Anna, Kim Hyeseon
- World War Zombie 월드 워 좀비 (14 August 2013) – Kim Seongwon, Jeong Taeho, Kim Janggun, Jo Suyeon
- Making Woman Show 메이킹우먼쇼 (14 July 2013) – Heo Anna, Kim Yeonghui, Jeong Jimin, Park Sora
- Love Artistses 러브 아티스트스트스 (10 April 2013) – Heo Kyung-hwan, Ryu Geunji, Seo Taehun
- Tears of Antarctica 남극의 눈물 (19 June 2013) – Lee Seungyun, Kim Daehui, Lee Dongyun

=== Chuseok Special (9 September 2014) ===
- 이 부부가 사는 법 (28 August 2013) – Song Wangho, Jeong Beomgyun, Shin Goeun, Kim Daeseong, Lee Huigyeong, Park Jisun, Park Yeongjin
- 트러블 과외 (4 December 2013) – Park Soyeong, Kim Jimin, Park Seongho
- 그래 이거야 (20 November 2013) – Im Woo-il, Lee Sangmin, Jeong Taeho, Lee Dongyun
- 초근접 현미경 (27 May 2014) – Kwak Beom, Park Yeongjin, Song Byeongcheol, Kim Jiho, Kim Kiyeol, Lee Jonghun
- 사람 일은 모른다 (23 October 2013) – Hong Yeseul, Jeong Haecheol, Yang Sangguk, Ryu Jeongnam, Jeong Taeho
- 음모론 (30 July 2014) – Kim Kiyeol, Hong Hwon, Kim Nina, Kim Kiri, Oh Gihwan
