= List of Gaon Digital Chart number ones of 2013 =

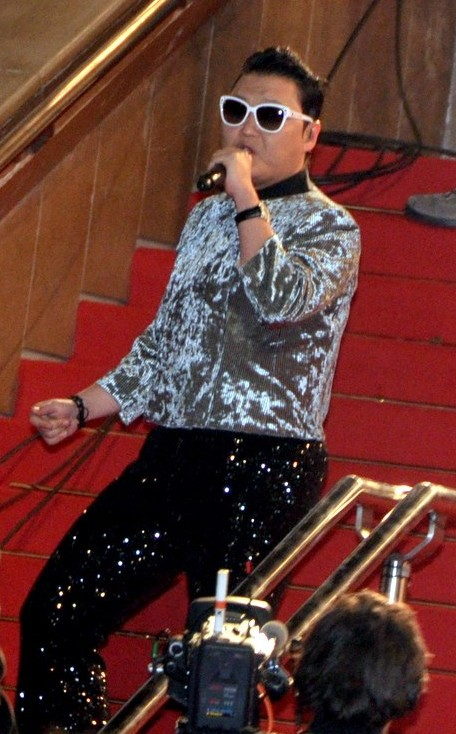
Psy earned the year's best-performing single with "Gentleman".

The Gaon Digital Chart of Gaon Music Chart is a chart that ranks the best-performing songs in South Korea. The data is collected by the Korea Music Content Association. It consists of a weekly chart, listed from Sunday to Saturday, a monthly chart, and a yearly chart. Below is a list of songs that topped the weekly, monthly, and yearly charts. The Digital Chart ranks songs according to their performance on the Gaon Download, Streaming and BGM charts.

== Weekly charts ==
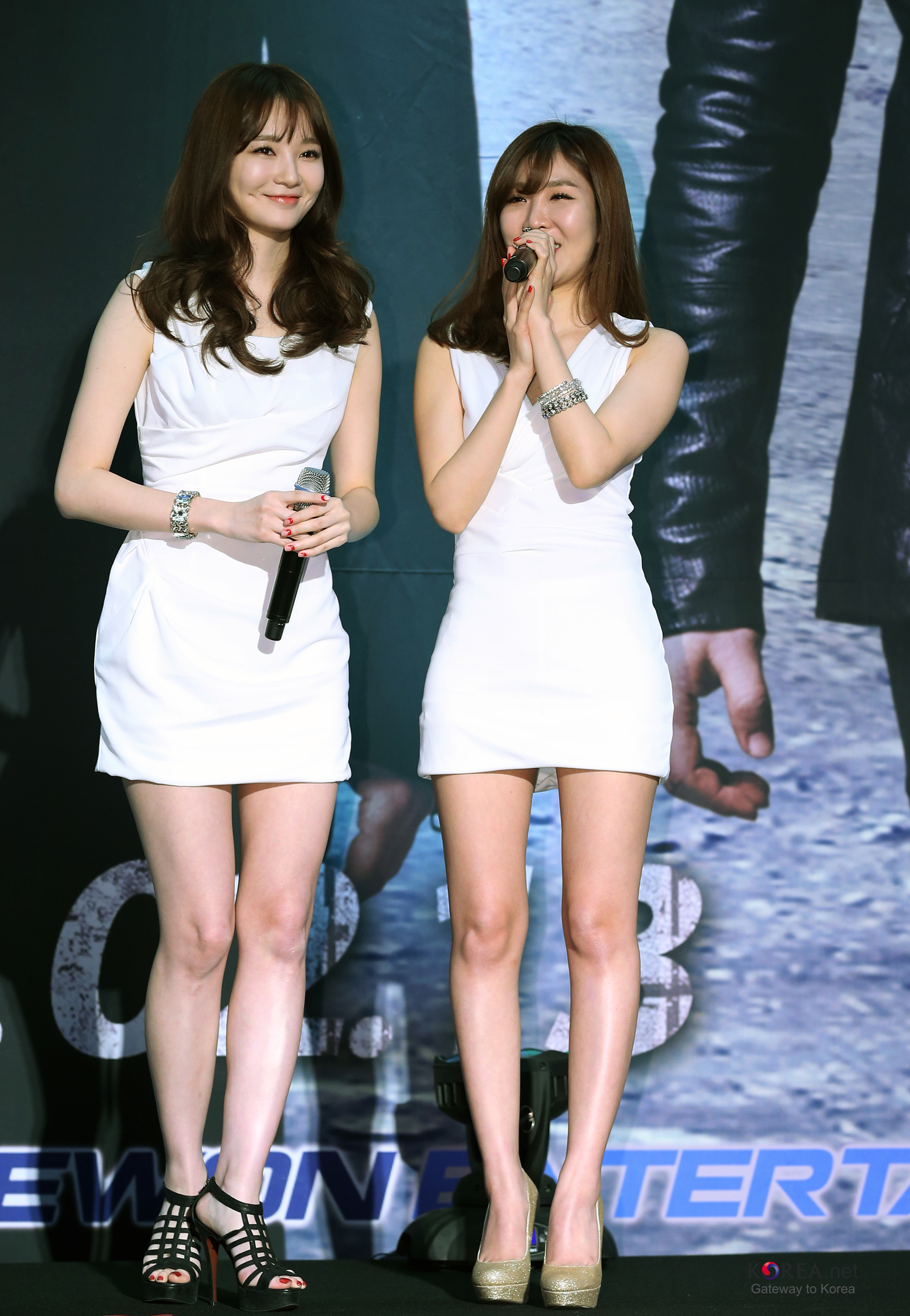
Duo Davichi scored three number-one songs with "Turtle", "The Letter", and "Be Warmed".

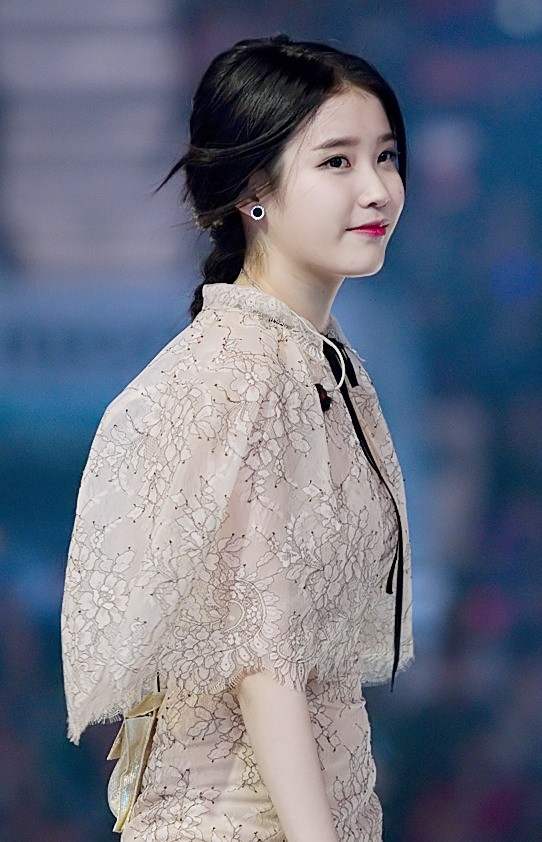
IU earned two number-one singles with "The Red Shoes" and "Friday".

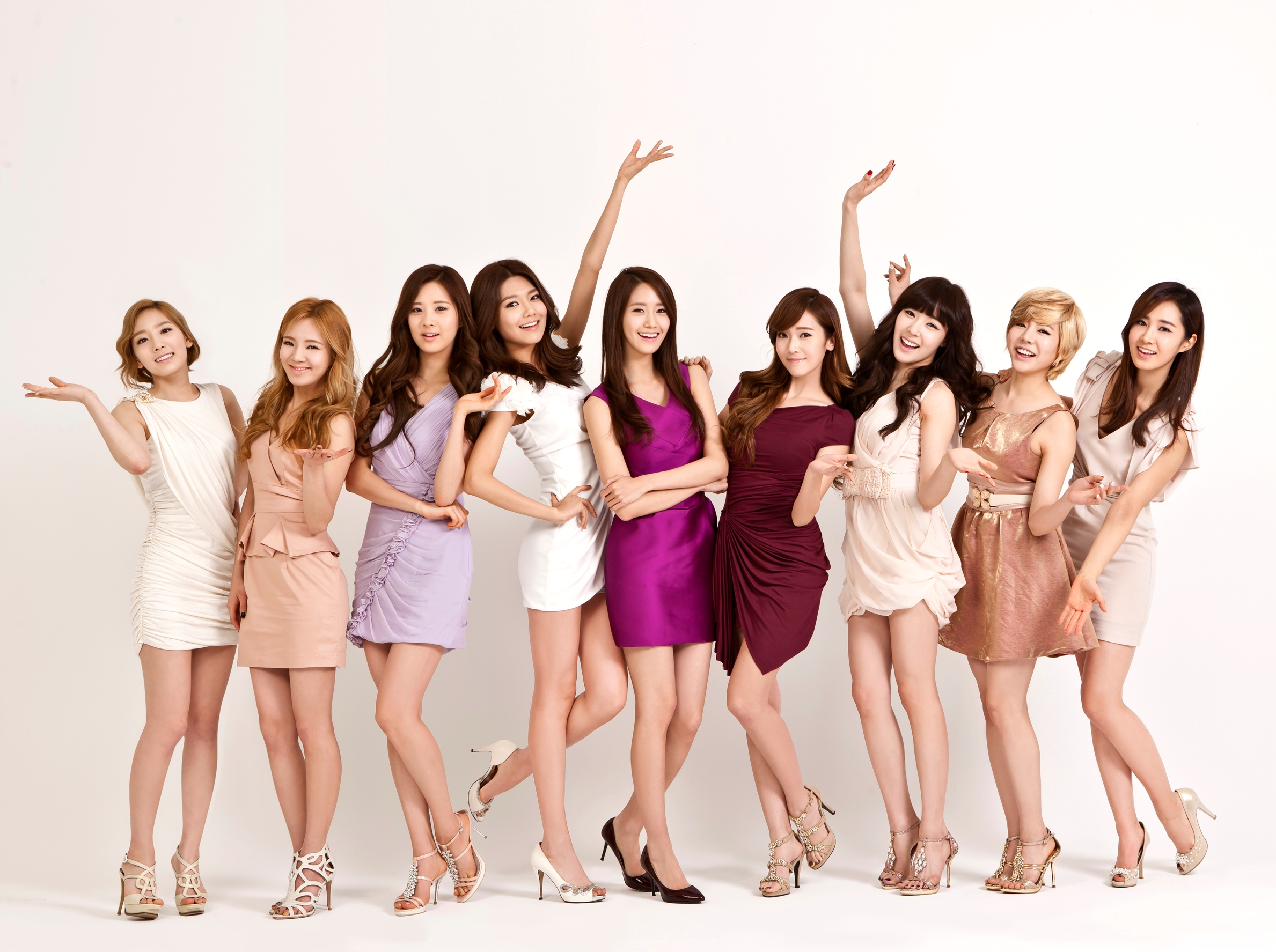
Girls' Generation's "I Got a Boy" was the best-performing single of January.

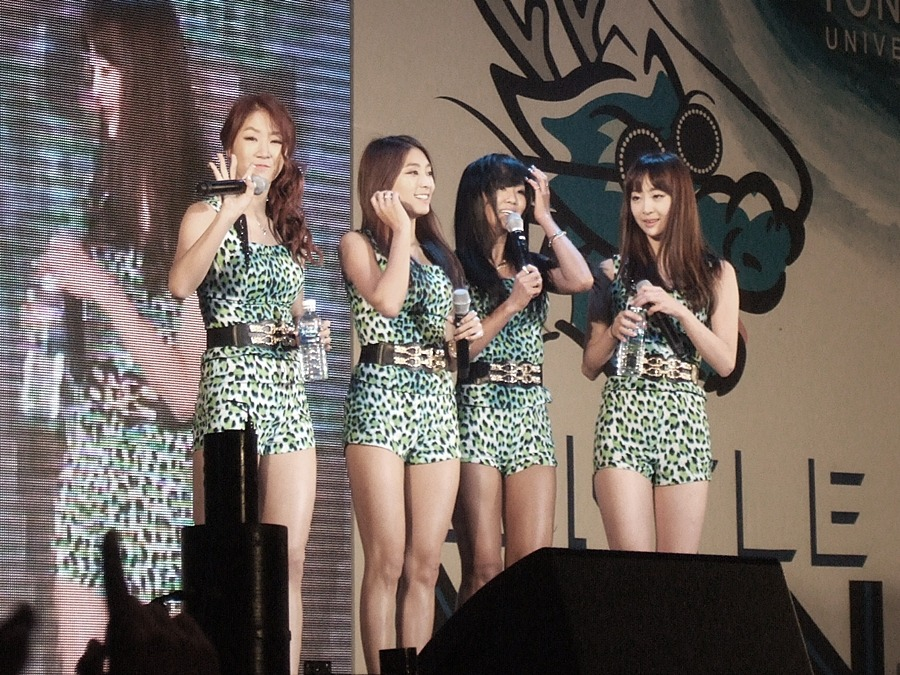
Sistar's "Give It to Me" peaked at number one for two weeks. The group's subunit Sistar19 also spent two weeks at number one with "Gone Not Around Any Longer".

Key
†	Indicates best-performing single of 2013

Source: Gaon Weekly Digital Chart
Week end date	Song	Artist	Total downloads
January 5	"I Got a Boy"	Girls' Generation	319,824
January 12	"Gangbuk Cool Guy" (강북멋쟁이)	Jung Hyung Don	386,986
January 19	"Shower of Tears" (눈물샤워)	Baechigi featuring Ailee	336,159
January 26	"Shower of Tears" (눈물샤워)	Baechigi featuring Ailee	266,949
February 2	"Tears" (눈물)	Leessang featuring Yoojin of The SeeYa	359,130
February 9	"Gone Not Around Any Longer" (있다 없으니까)	Sistar19	317,949
February 16	"Gone Not Around Any Longer" (있다 없으니까)	Sistar19	187,239
February 23	"Dream Girl"	Shinee	248,244
March 2	"Winter Love"	The One	193,638
March 9	"Turtle" (거북이)	Davichi	288,006
March 16	"Crescendo"	Akdong Musician	342,381
March 23	"Crescendo"	Akdong Musician	186,701
March 30	"Rose"	Lee Hi	215,413
April 6	"Be Warmed" (녹는 중)	Davichi featuring Verbal Jint	341,514
April 13	"Gentleman" †	Psy	429,255
April 20	"Gentleman" †	Psy	443,517
April 27	"Spring Spring Spring" (봄봄봄)	Roy Kim	432,569
May 4	"Spring Spring Spring" (봄봄봄)	Roy Kim	229,637
May 11	"Miss Korea" (미스코리아)	Lee Hyori	421,775
May 18	"What's Your Name?" (이름이 뭐에요?)	4Minute	146,812
May 25	"Bad Girls"	Lee Hyori	301,764
June 1	"Will You Be Okay?" (괜찮겠니)	Beast	240,232
June 8	"Short Hair" (짧은머리)	Jung Eun-ji & Huh Gak	245,110
June 15	"Give It to Me"	Sistar	393,672
June 22	"Give It to Me"	Sistar	243,641
June 29	"My Love"	Lee Seung Chul	229,155
July 6	"BAAAM"	Dynamic Duo featuring Muzie of UV	363,272
July 13	"Falling in Love"	2NE1	376,823
July 20	"U&I"	Ailee	258,217
July 27	"U&I"	Ailee	155,458
August 3	"Rum Pum Pum Pum" (첫 사랑니)	f(x)	328,098
August 10	"Story of Someone I Know" (아는사람 얘기)	San E	238,746
August 17	"That You’re Mine" (넌 내꺼라는걸)	Huh Gak featuring Swings	211,602
August 24	"Attraction" (갖고놀래)	Bumkey featuring Dynamic Duo	219,705
August 31	"Touch Love" (터치 러브)	Yoon Mi Rae (Tasha)	294,409
September 7	"Who You?" (니가 뭔데)	G-Dragon	347,616
September 14	"Stupid in Love" (착해 빠졌어)	Soyou & Mad Clown	257,989
September 21	"Stupid in Love" (착해 빠졌어)	Soyou & Mad Clown	195,738
September 28	"Love, at First" (처음엔 사랑이란게)	Busker Busker	576,292
October 5	"Love, at First" (처음엔 사랑이란게)	Busker Busker	209,242
October 12	"The Red Shoes" (분홍신)	IU	437,461
October 19	"Everybody"	Shinee	198,409
October 26	"You Don't Know Love" (촌스럽게 왜 이래)	K.Will	264,070
November 2	"Now" (내일은 없어)	Trouble Maker	338,631
November 9	"I Got C"	Park Myeong Su & Primary (featuring Gaeko)	480,088
November 16	"The Letter" (편지)	Davichi	283,394
November 23	"Missing You" (그리워해요)	2NE1	269,288
November 30	"One Way Love" (너 밖에 몰라)	Hyolyn	233,151
December 7	"Loved You" (이별남녀)	Seo In-guk & Zia	267,140
December 14	"Winter Propose" (겨울 고백)	Sung Si-kyung, Park Hyo-shin, Seo In-guk, VIXX & Yeo Dong-saeng	245,160
December 21	"Dali, Van, Picasso"	Beenzino	190,598
December 28	"Friday" (금요일에 만나요)	IU	212,949

== Monthly charts ==
Source: Gaon Monthly Digital Chart
Month	Song	Artist	Total Downloads – Streams	Ref
January	"I Got a Boy"	Girls' Generation	910,253 – 10,081,772	
February	"Gone Not Around Any Longer"	Sistar19	812,050 – 11,567,691	
March	"Turtle"	Davichi	696,847 – 10,266,983	
April	"Gentleman" †	Psy	1,072,017 – 14,019,290	
May	"What's Your Name?"	4Minute	685,405 – 14,537,525	
June	"Give It to Me"	Sistar	812,688 – 11,365,529	
July	"BAAAM"	Dynamic Duo featuring Muzie of UV	726,183 – 13,299,779	
August	"Story of Someone I Know"	San E	647,432 – 13,139,387	
September	"Touch Love"	Yoon Mi Rae (Tasha)	606,655 – 15,555,639	
October	"The Red Shoes"	IU	785,917 – 13,768,525	
November	"Going To Try"	Jeong Hyeong-don & G-Dragon	701,434 – 13,465,832	
December	"Loved You"	Seo In-guk & Zia	533,936 – 12,380,601	
