= Hyolyn =

South Korean singer (born 1990)

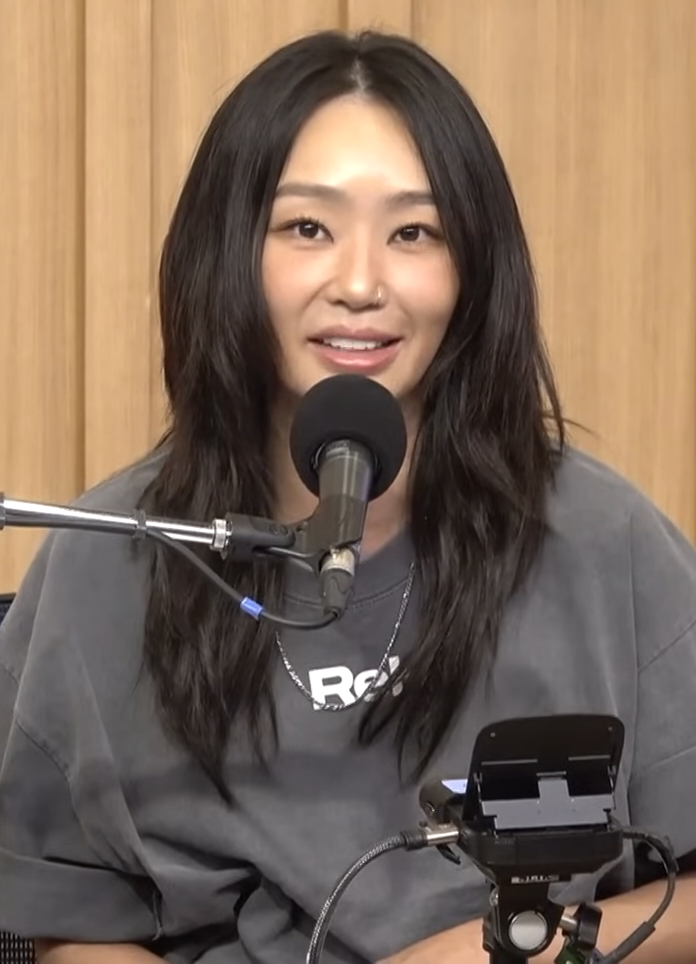
- Hyolyn in 2025
- Born: Kim Hyo-jung; December 11, 1990 (age 35); Incheon, South Korea
- Education: Sungshin Women's University – Department of Media and Visual Acting
- Occupations: Singer; songwriter
- Musical career
- Genres: K-pop; R&B
- Instrument: Vocals
- Years active: 2010–present
- Labels: Starship; Bridʒ; ReH
- Member of: Sistar19
- Formerly of: Sistar

Korean name
- Hangul: 김효정
- Hanja: 金孝靜
- RR: Gim Hyojeong
- MR: Kim Hyojŏng

Stage name
- Hangul: 효린
- RR: Hyorin
- MR: Hyorin

Signature
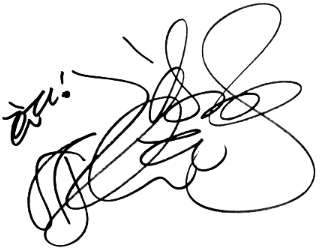

Kim Hyo-jung (Korean: 김효정; born December 11, 1990), better known by her stage name Hyolyn (효린), is a South Korean singer and songwriter. Currently, she is under the management of Bridʒ, a production company she founded herself. She is a former member of the South Korean girl group Sistar and their sub-unit Sistar19.

== Life and career ==
=== 1990–2009: Early life and career beginnings ===
Kim Hyo-jung was born on December 11, 1990, in Incheon, South Korea. Her father is a retired Marine Corps officer. Born prematurely, Hyolyn's infancy was complicated by a serious form of biliary atresia, which led to several surgeries, intussusception and the eventual loss of her gall bladder. She explained on the TV program Strong Heart in 2011 that she grew up a sickly child but has since regained most of her health. Hyolyn has one younger sister, Kim Hye-jung.

Hyolyn stated that she has loved singing and dancing since childhood and that no one was around to help her so she began picking up auditions on her own. She auditioned for JYP Entertainment two times before being accepted after placing first in the audition. She was set to debut in a project group with Secret's Jieun, EXID's Hani, and Bestie's Uji. However, plans for their debut were cancelled. Hyolyn then left JYP and joined Starship Entertainment, auditioning with a cover of Christina Aguilera's "Hurt". Starship began forming a new girl group in 2010, with Hyolyn as the leader. The group were praised for their fresh faces and vocal abilities.

=== 2010–2011: Debut with Sistar and Sistar19 ===
On June 3, 2010, Hyolyn made her debut as a member of Sistar on KBS' Music Bank with their debut single, "Push Push".

In early 2011, Hyolyn and group member Bora formed the sub-group Sistar19. They released the successful single "Ma Boy" in 2011 and on October 17, 2011, Hyolyn released the single "Ma Boy 2", featuring Electroboyz. Their first EP Gone Not Around Any Longer, with a title track of the same name, was released in January 2013 and was met with success on several music charts.

=== 2012–2014: First acting role and solo debut with Love & Hate ===
In 2012, Hyolyn starred in the KBS drama Dream High Season 2 as Nana, a famous idol from the fictional girl group Hershe. She teamed up with Ailee and T-ara's Jiyeon for the song "Superstar" for the soundtrack.

In August 2013, Hyolyn sang an OST for the SBS' drama, Master's Sun, titled "You Make Me Go Crazy". On November 22, she shared the stage with Stevie Wonder for a special performance of "I Just Called to Say I Love You" at the 2013 Mnet Asian Music Awards, one of South Korea's biggest music award shows. Hyolyn made her solo debut on November 26 with the album Love & Hate. The album contained double title tracks, "Lonely" and "One Way Love", featuring Korean rappers Mad Clown, Block B's Zico, Dok2, and Geeks' Lil Boi, and some tracks produced by Brave Brothers and Kim Do-hoon. Both of the album's singles saw success, with "One Way Love" winning first place on several music shows, placing number one on Gaon's Weekly Digital Chart and number one on Billboard's K-Pop Hot 100, with "Lonely" falling at number four and number three respectively. On December 31, the music video for the Korean version of "Let It Go" for Disney's animated film Frozen, sung by Hyolyn, was revealed.

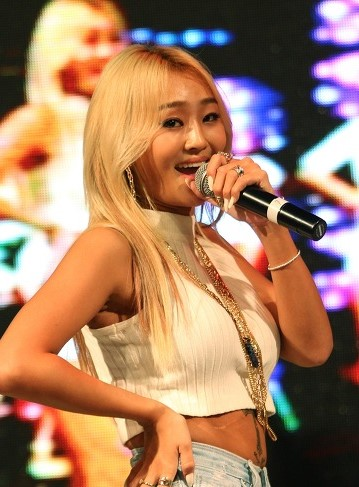
Hyolyn performing in 2014

In January 2014, Hyolyn released an OST for the drama My Love from the Star titled "Goodbye". On March 28, Starship Entertainment announced on their Twitter account that Hyolyn would feature in Mad Clown's comeback track, "Without You", released on April 3. She also participated in rapper MC Mong's comeback to the Korean scene after five years with the album Miss Me or Diss Me, released on November 3. On November 20, she collaborated with singer-songwriter and fellow label mate, Jooyoung, on a track titled "Erase" (지워) featuring Iron, which peaked at number nine on the Gaon Weekly chart. Hyolyn was the first idol group singer to participate in the Chuseok special of the music variety show I Am a Singer that aired on September 9. She ranked second overall.

=== 2015–2016: It's Me ===
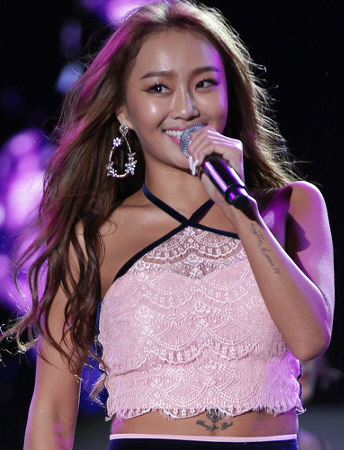
Hyolyn performing at the G Festival Asia Dream Concert in 2016

On January 13, it was revealed that Hyolyn was to join MBC's I Am a Singer Season 3 as the first idol singer to feature on the show. She was the first contestant eliminated from the show but still impressed viewers with her song choices, especially her emotional rendition of Lee Sun-hee's classic ballad "Fate", which brought the audience to tears. On April 2, Hyolyn teamed up with her bandmate Soyou to cover K.Will's song "Growing" as Starship Entertainment's cover project. On August 17, it was revealed that Hyolyn was to join Unpretty Rapstar Season 2. Hyolyn released her Unpretty Rapstar's semi-finals track "My Love" featuring Basick on November 6, 2015. She finished the show in third place. On December 14, Hyolyn, Jooyoung, and Bumkey collaborated with producing team Da Internz on the song "Love Line". On December 16, she released an OST for the movie The Little Prince called "Turnaround", along with an accompanying music video.

On March 6, 2016, Hyolyn participated in the singing competition King of Mask Singer where she placed second. On June 17, Hyolyn was a contestant on Duet Song Festival where she and her partner, Lee Na-hyun, placed second with "Sofa" by R&B singer Crush. On July 15 Hyolyn released an OST for KBS2' Uncontrollably Fond titled "I Miss You". On October 21, she featured in a song with Far East Movement and Gill Chang titled, "Umbrella". After earlier reports that Hyolyn was to release her first EP, an official schedule revealed the release date to be November 8, and also showed features from prominent rapper Dok2 and singer Jay Park for the tracks "Love Like This" and "One Step" respectively. The EP, titled It's Me, was released, with the title track "Paradise" and the accompanying music video.

=== 2017–2019: Collaborations, Sistar's disbandment, and formation of own label ===
Hyolyn participated in the OST for KBS2' Hwarang: The Poet Warrior Youth with "Our Tears" (서로의 눈물이 되어), released on January 9, 2017. On April 14, 2017, Starship Entertainment released a collaboration track featuring Hyolyn and rapper Changmo, titled "Blue Moon", a medium tempo electronic dance track produced by Groovy Room. The track saw success in streaming, digital downloads and, upon its release, hit the upper ranks of several real-time charts including Bugs, Genie and Soribada. It ranked number three on the Gaon Weekly Digital Chart and received nominations for "Best Collaboration" at the 2017 Mnet Asian Music Awards and "Digital Music" division at the 32nd Annual Golden Disk Awards. After seven years as a group, it was announced on May 23, 2017, that Sistar was to disband. Their final track, titled "Lonely", was released on May 31, rising to the top of the charts and hitting number on the Gaon Weekly Digital Chart. It was nominated for "Best R&B/Soul Song" at the 2017 Melon Music Awards. The Groovy Room produced track "Fruity" featuring Hyolyn and Kisum was released on June 29. On August 25, Hyolyn's OST for tvN's Live Up To Your Name, titled "Always", was released. On September 9, 2017, Hyolyn uploaded a handwritten letter to her personal Instagram account, stating that she had decided to leave Starship Entertainment and would start anew without an agency for the time being. In late 2017, Hyolyn featured in two episodes of the music broadcast Fantastic Duo 2, competing against Jinusean and collaborating alongside popular group Got7 with a rendition of her hit track, "Blue Moon".

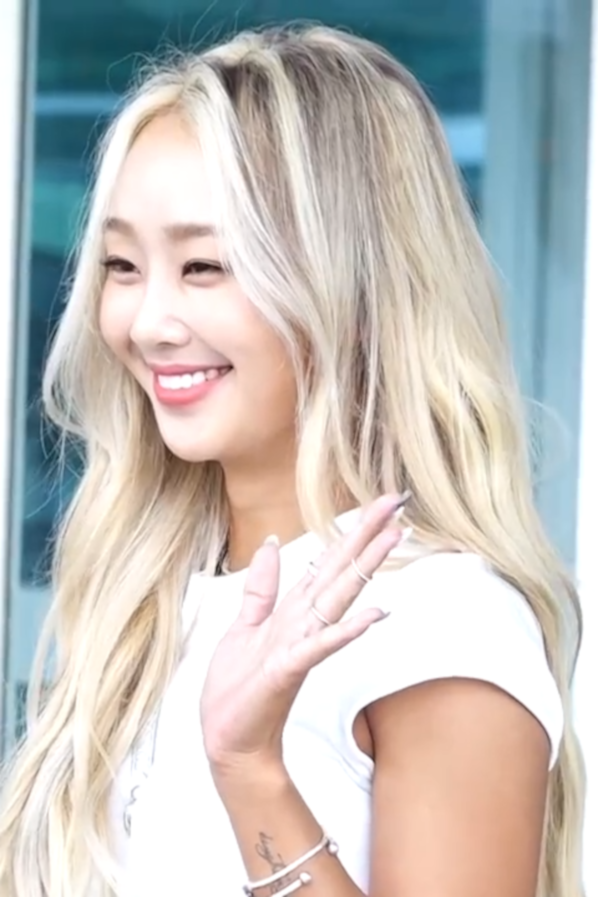
Hyolyn at Incheon Airport in 2018

Not long after Hyolyn announced her departure from Starship Entertainment, she founded her own music label, Bridʒ. She explained in an official statement on November 13, 2017, that the company name, pronounced "Bridge", was meant to symbolize the bridge that she hopes to build between the public and all forms of music production, just how the bridge in a song connects to the song's climax. During the following months, Hyolyn lent her voice to two separate OST tracks; "태업 시계 (Wind Up Watch)" for the drama Black Knight: The Man Who Guards Me, released on December 20, 2017, and "스쳐간 꿈처럼 (Dreamy Love)" for the drama Money Flower, released on January 13, 2018. Hyolyn officially announced the beginning of her independent work for Bridʒ on January 22, 2018. She announced her plan to unveil a three-part project consisting of three separate singles, starting with her medium tempo, acoustic-pop single "내일할래 (To Do List)", released on February 6, 2018.

On February 28, Hyolyn featured on Got7's pre-release track "너 하나만 (One and Only You)", a single from their later released studio album, Eyes On You. On April 23, 2018, she revealed the second single from her three-part project, titled "달리 (Dally)", featuring Korean rapper and producer Gray. The song is an upbeat track, styled with R&B-pop vocals and hip hop percussion. Both Hyolyn and Gray participated in lyrics and production. For the song's accompanying music video, Hyolyn, along with four other dancers, performed choreography by American choreographer Aliya Janell. The music video garnered over one million views in less than 24 hours of release. The last single for her three-part project, titled "바다보러갈래 (See Sea)", was released on July 19, 2018. Her next single, "BAE", was released on August 14, 2018. Hyolyn collaborated with Melanie Fontana on the single titled "니가 더 잘 알잖아 (youknowbetter)", which was released on May 22, 2019. She began her first solo world tour "2019 Hyolyn 1st World Tour [TRUE]," in Berlin, May 29. The tour will run from Europe, the Middle East to Asia, ending with a concert in Tokyo on June 30.

=== 2020–present: Say My Name, QueenDom, Ice, and solo concerts ===
On August 19, 2020, Hyolyn released her second EP Say My Name, with the title track of the same name. The album features the song "9Lives", an autobiographical song, that's performance was praised for its artistic expression of the story. Say My Name also includes the previously released singles "Dally", "See Sea" and "BAE".

Hyolyn was originally set to release the new digital single "Layin' Low", on November 30, 2021, but the release was delayed to January 2022. Beforehand, she released a special Christmas single titled "A-Ha" on December 22, 2021. On January 12, 2022, Hyolyn released the single "Layin' Low" which features Jooyoung.

On February 21, 2022, it was confirmed that Hyolyn will be participating in the second season of Queendom. On May 23, 2022, Hyolyn announced she will be performing at Youth Festival 2022 which will be held from June 10 to 12, and will take to the stage on the 10th, the first day of the festival. On June 20, 2022, Hyolyn will join the Weverse platform to communicate with fans around the world. On June 22, 2022, Hyolyn announced that she would release her third EP Ice on July 18.

In August 2022, Hyolyn announced that her solo concert, HYOLYN 2022 CONCERT 'iCE', will be held at Yes24 Live Hall on September 3 and 4.

She released her OriginaLyn EP in July 2026.

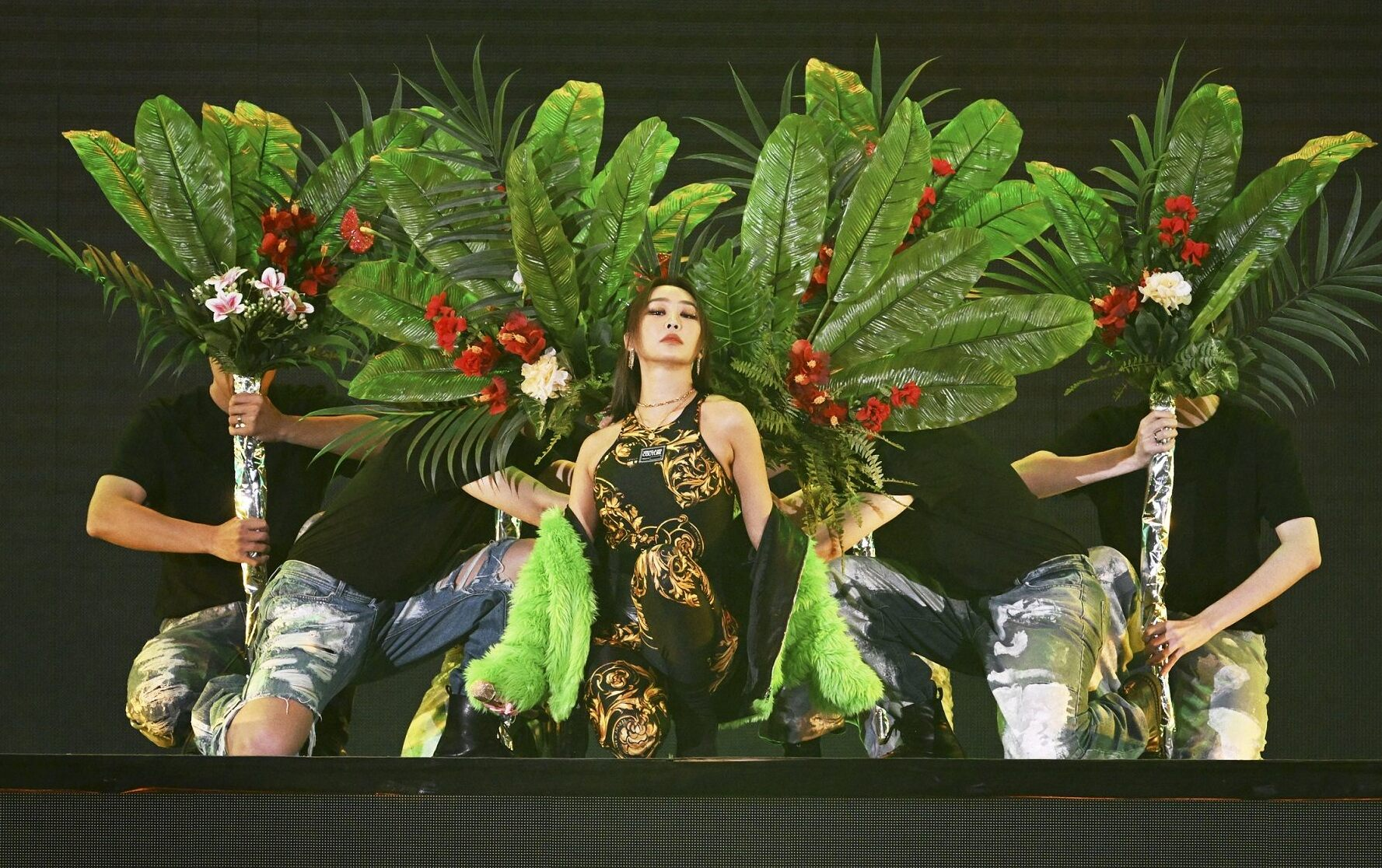
Hyolyn performing at 2023 Taipei New Year's Eve Party

== Other ventures ==
=== Endorsements ===
In August 2011, Hyolyn was selected by Banila Co. as their advertising model for their newly released product "Club Rococo". In July 2012, Hyolyn joined Lee Kwang-soo, Kim Jong-kook, and Kang Gary as advertising models for the "Galaxy R Style" edition of the smartphone brand Samsung. In November 2012, Hyolyn, alongside Hyuna and Goo Hara, was selected by Lotte Liquor as the model for their 2012 "Like the First" campaign. In December 2012, Hyolyn and Lee Sang-woo were selected as new models for Lotte Chilsung Beverage's "Let's-B Cafe Time".

In February 2014, Hyolyn and Yook Joong-wan were chosen as advertising models for Lotte Liquor's 2014 "Like the First" campaign, with a special video released ahead of the promotion. In May 2014, Coca-Cola selected Hyolyn as an advertising model for the drink "Sun's Mate Tea." In November 2014, Hyolyn, along with Soyou, was selected as a brand model for Vickers. They promoted goose-down jackets for the brand as part of the 2014 campaign. In March 2015, they promoted newly released tracksuits for the 2015 photoshoot of the same brand.

In November 2017, Hyolyn was selected as the body care product model for the cosmetic brand Amipure. In the same month, Hyolyn became an active sportswear brand model with Nike under the 'NIKE X Bridʒ' collaboration project.

In July 2018, Hyolyn was selected as a model for a collaboration project with global sports brand Adidas. Hyolyn posted a series of fashion pictorial images with Adidas Originals, featured on with the released of her new single "See Sea" from her three-part project album Set-Up Time. In September 2018, Hyolyn was selected by the cosmetic brand Missha as their new model. As part of the campaign, Hyolyn unveiled an advertisement featuring a different look as a Missha Glow Skin Dation model newly launched by Missha, a cosmetic brand of Able C&C.

In January 2019, Puma selected Hyolyn as their model for their women's sneaker brand Cali in Southeast Asia. Puma released a "#CaliTravelog" campaign video featuring Hyolyn's single "See Sea" as part of the campaign. In the same month, denim brand Jambangee announced the selection of Hyolyn as its new muse for the 2019 S/S (spring/summer) season. In April 2019, the brand announced that it had released the Hyolyn Tattoo T-shirt, as part of a collaboration series with Hyolyn.

In May 2019, Budweiser selected Hyolyn as an ambassador for their "Be a King" campaign. The brand mentioned tattoos as a key theme, which is emerging as a means of creative self-expression but still has uncomfortable views and misunderstandings. Hyolyn introduces her experience of getting a tattoo on her abdomen to cover up the scars from her surgery and spread the message of Budweiser's brand spirit of "freedom, challenge, and passion" to the public.

=== Philanthropy ===
In April 2013, Hyolyn and Soyou embarked on an eight-day, seven-night volunteer mission to Liberia in Africa. Working with the Milal Welfare Foundation, Hyolyn and Soyou conducted volunteer work by helping local villagers. In the same month, Hyolyn and Soyou went to volunteer at "Greennae", a vocational rehabilitation center for the disabled, as part of the Sungshin Women's University's Change Social Volunteer Corps.

In May 2013, Hyolyn revealed her humanitarian activity with abandoned animals. She joined the volunteer organization "Give Love to an Abandoned Dog" in Hwaseong, Gyeonggi Province three years prior to making her debut with Sistar. Through a feed firm, Hyolyn arranged a fan-signing event that allowed her to contribute enough food for the volunteer group for an entire year. In August 2017, Hyolyn hosted a flea market event for stray dogs, all the proceeds from the event went to the same volunteer organization.

In February 2014, Hyolyn and Bora took part in a large-scale charity project to commemorate the 11th anniversary of star & fashion magazine InStyle Korea. Hyolyn and Bora volunteered at Kkongkkongine, a shelter for abandoned dogs under Kara, an animal protection civic organisation in Yongin.

In August 2016, Hyolyn joined the 12th Volunteer Corps of Natural Balance Blue Angel Volunteers in visiting the Hwaseong "Yusaju (Give Love to Stray Dogs)" shelter to do volunteer work. In November 2017, Hyolyn, along with other idols, held a fan-signing session for the Blue Angel Volunteer Corps. The event raised 18 million won in donations in the names of the idols who took part. In September 2018, Hyolyn took part in "Shall We Walk", a fundraising event to support the treatment costs of 24 children with rare diseases.

In December 2019, Hyolyn participated in the #MyCat campaign, an art collaboration between Dazed and Paul & Joe Beaute. As part of the campaign, photos of Hyolyn and her cat were completed as artworks and sold at an exhibition, the proceeds of which were donated to the animal protection organization Yusaju.

== Discography ==
- Love & Hate (2013)

== Filmography ==
=== Television series ===
Year	Title	Role	Notes	Ref.
2012	Dream High 2	Na-na	Main Role	

=== Television shows ===
Year	Title	Role	Note	Ref.
2015	I Am a Singer 3	Contestant	Hyolyn became the first idol group singer to join the show	
2015	Unpretty Rapstar 2	Contestant	Finalist; finished as second runner-up behind KittiB and Truedy	
2022	Queendom 2	Contestant	Hyolyn joined as the only soloist; joined alongside five female K-pop groups	
2025	Boys II Planet	Vocal Master	Main cast	

=== Web shows ===
Year	Title	Role	Note	Ref.
2021	Double Trouble	Contestant	Official winner alongside Kim Junsu for their "Coming of Age Ceremony" collaboration stage.	

== Awards and nominations ==
Name of the award ceremony, year presented, award category, nominee(s) of the award, and the result of the nomination
Award ceremony	Year	Category	Nominee(s)/work(s)	Result	Ref.
Asian Pop Music Awards (Note: Hosted by the Hong Kong Asia Pacific International Group and Sunway Records, the Asian Pop Music Awards bases its winners on "Asian Pop Music Chart" which opened in September 2019.)	2021	Best Collaboration (Overseas)	"Summer or Summer" (with Dasom)	Nominated	
Brand of the Year Awards	2022	Best Female Solo Singer	Hyolyn	Nominated	
Brand Customer Loyalty Awards	2022	Most Influential – Female Solo Singer	Hyolyn	Nominated	
Gaon Chart Music Awards	2022	MuBeat Global Choice Award (Female)	Hyolyn	Nominated	
Golden Disc Awards	2018	Digital Song Bonsang	"Blue Moon" (with Changmo)	Longlisted	
Korea Drama Awards	2012	Best New Actress	Dream High 2	Nominated	
Korea Drama Awards	2014	Best Original Soundtrack	"Hello, Goodbye" — My Love from the Star OST	Nominated	
Mnet Asian Music Awards	2014	Artist of the Year	Hyolyn	Longlisted	
Mnet Asian Music Awards	2014	Best Dance Performance Solo	One Way Love	Nominated	
Mnet Asian Music Awards	2014	Best Female Artist	Hyolyn	Nominated	
Mnet Asian Music Awards	2014	Song of the Year	One Way Love	Longlisted	
Mnet Asian Music Awards	2017	Best Collaboration	"Blue Moon" (with Changmo)	Nominated	
Mnet Asian Music Awards	2017	Qoo10's Artist of the Year	Hyolyn	Longlisted	
Mnet Asian Music Awards	2018	Best Collaboration	"Dally" (with GRAY)	Nominated	
Mnet Asian Music Awards	2018	Best Dance Performance Solo	"Dally" (with GRAY)	Nominated	
Mnet Asian Music Awards	2018	Song of the Year	"Dally" (with GRAY)	Longlisted	
Mnet Asian Music Awards	2021	Best Collaboration	"Summer or Summer" (with Dasom)	Nominated	
Pet Culture Awards	2024	Pet Broadcast Grand Prize	Hyolyn	Won	
Seoul International Drama Awards	2014	Outstanding Korean Drama OST	"Crazy of You" — Master's Sun OST	Nominated	
Seoul International Youth Film Festival	2014	Best OST by a Female Artist	"Crazy of You" — Master's Sun OST	Nominated	
