= A Style For You =

2015 South Korean television series

- Promotional poster
- Genre: Fashion, Beauty
- Starring: Kim Hee-chul; Yoon Bo-ra; Goo Hara; Ahn Hee-yeon
- Country of origin: South Korea
- Original language: Korean
- No. of episodes: 12

Production
- Production locations: China, South Korea

Original release
- Network: KBS2
- Release: April 5 – June 21, 2015

A Style For You (Korean: 어스타일포유) was a South Korean fashion-beauty show that encourages idols to create their own fashion styles instead of relying on stylists. It airs every Sunday on KBS2 at 11:55 p.m. KST.

== Broadcast time ==
Air Date	Airtime
April 5, 2015	Sunday at 12:30 AM KST
April 12–26, 2015	Sunday at 12:00 AM KST
May 3 – June 21, 2015	Sunday at 11:55 PM KST

== Host ==
- Main MC
  - Heechul
  - Yoon Bo-ra
  - Goo Hara
  - Ahn Hee-yeon
- Special MC
  - Cho Saeho (episode 7)
  - Heo Young-ji (episode 9)

== Format ==
A Style For You is the first global interactive style show to air on a main broadcast station, (KBS). It showcases the 4 idols' honest, real lives and their various characters.

=== Global style hashtags ===
The Mega-Project of "A Style For You".

Episode	Title	Guest(s)	Country	Notes
2	"Beauty Blenders"	Kate	Poland (Europe)	She's a fashion and beauty director
2	"Bone broth"	Lee Minu, Kim Sehui, Daniel Leung	New York City (United States)	
2	"Rolling/Practical Bag"	Lvy Chen	Toronto (Canada)	She's a fashion designer
2	"Storm petrel nest"	Ru Hanyen	China (East Asia)	She's a beauty reporter of B News
3	"Urban Chic/Normcore Look"	Chloe Ting	Melbourne (Australia)	She's a fashion blogger
3	"Ninja Restaurant"	Joy Nickens	New Jersey (United States)	She's a writer for Technical Specialty
3	"Skin care trends in spring"	Ru Hanyen	China (East Asia)	She's a beauty reporter for B News
4	"Elegant Petal Blush"	Michelle Ho	Hong Kong (China)	She's a professional makeup artist
4	"Corn on the cob"	Claudia Gonzalez	Mexico (North America)	She's a community manager
4	"Hijab"	Hoda katebi	Chicago (United States)	She's Iranian
5	"Boyfriend Denims, Statdment Earing"	Samantha Mariko	Tokyo (Japan)	She's model and blogger
5	"Eyes Makeup Marsala Color"	Tiffany Lee	Hong Kong (China)	She's a professional celebrity hairstylist
7	"Culture Between Korea & England"	Josh	England (United Kingdom)	
7	"Spring-Summer Looks"	Alison Liaudat	Switzerland (Europe)	She's a fashion blogger
7	"Pore Treatments"	Ru Hanyen	China (East Asia)	She's a beauty reporter for B News
8	"Salt in Coffee"	Jien Jingkwan	Taiwan (China)	
8	"Special D.I.Y Lip Makeup"	Memekeeley	Manchester (England)	
8	"Show My Style"	Elena Sandri, Francesca Lesch	Italy, Germany (Europe)	
9	"Unique fashion items in Harajuku"	Junko Suzuki	Tokyo (Japan)	She's a model and photographer
9	"Brick Lane Market"	Jeong Suhyeon, Dean Lockwood	London (England)	
9	"Horse Oil Cream, Multi-use makeup Kit"	Ru Hanyen	China (East Asia)	She's a beauty reporter for B News
10	"Fruits"	Kaori, Nakagawa Hitomi, Yusa Hitomi	Okinawa (Japan), Tokyo (Japan)	
10	"Pixelated Hair Color"	Patrick Macgyver	United States	He's a hair designer
10	"Trend Styling from all over the word"	Sara Brand, Claudia Adaszvnika, Danika Ibanez	Poland (Europe), California (USA), Philippines	
11	"A Beer Foam Marker"	Yamaguchi Makana	Fukuoka	
11	"Popular chinese blogger"	Luhan Yen	China (East Asia)	
11	"Global Summer Style from all over the world"	Chichi Wang, Vidaul, Victoria Perez	England, Spain (Europe), Vietnam	

== List of episodes ==
Episode#	Air Date	Subject	Guest(s)	Final Winner
1	April 5, 2015	Living without stylists for a week	Park Seo-joon, Shinhwa, I Wish MV Cast	Hara
2	April 12, 2015	Cover your weakness	Song Kyungah	Bora
3	April 19, 2015	Discover the color trends of 2015	Hong Seokcheon	Bora & Hani Team
4	April 26, 2015	Make your own style	LE, Gain, Pi Hyeonjeong	Heechul
5	May 3, 2015	Denim style	Han Jin	Hara
6	May 10, 2015	Find any trouble you have and get rid of them	Hwang Yohan, Gunhee, Park Hyejin, Heo Young-ji	Hani
7	May 17, 2015	Go back to the 70s	Josh	Heechul & Hani Team
8	May 24, 2015	Thank the people you are grateful to	Fabien	
9	May 31, 2015	Wedding Special	Seo Hye-lin, Kim Usik, Park Eun-ji	Heo Young-ji
10	June 7, 2015	Complete a vacation look (Summer Special)	Jang Doyeon, Kim Sae-rom	Hara
11	June 14, 2015	You've worked hard, Go camping! with the crew	Alex Chu	Hara & Bora Team
12	June 21, 2015	A flea market of your own	Lady Jane, Gunhee, Seo Sookyung, Sistar	Hara

== Rating ==
In the ratings below, the highest rating for the show will be in red, and the lowest rating for the show will be in blue.

Ep. #	Broadcast date	Ratings
1	April 5, 2015	2.6%
2	April 12, 2015	1.5% (-1.1)
3	April 19, 2015	2% (+0.5)
4	April 26, 2015	1.8% (-0.2)
5	May 3, 2015	1.7% (-0.1)
6	May 10, 2015	1.9% (+0.2)
7	May 17, 2015	1.3% (-0.6)
8	May 24, 2015	2.2% (+0.7)
9	May 31, 2015	1.8% (-0.4)
10	June 7, 2015	1.4% (-0.4)
11	June 14, 2015	1% (-0.4)
12	June 21, 2015	1.7% (+0.7)
