= Yoon Bo-ra =

South Korean singer, rapper and actress (born 1989)

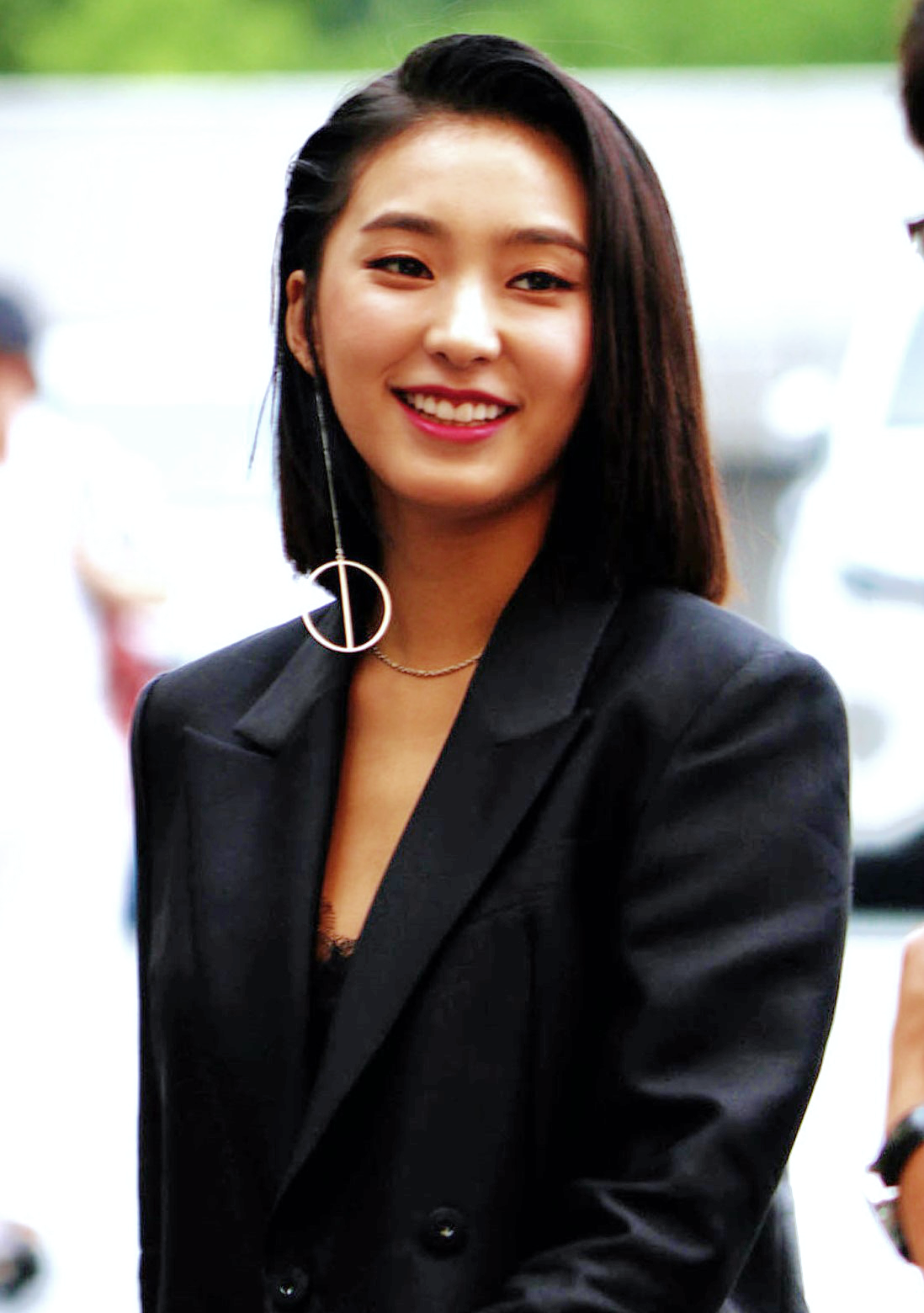
- Bora in 2016
- Born: December 30, 1989 (age 36); Seoul, South Korea
- Education: Myongji University
- Occupations: Singer; rapper; actress
- Years active: 2010–present
- Musical career
- Genre: K-pop
- Instrument: Vocals
- Label: Starship
- Member of: Sistar19
- Formerly of: Sistar

Korean name
- Hangul: 윤보라
- RR: Yun Bora
- MR: Yun Pora

Signature
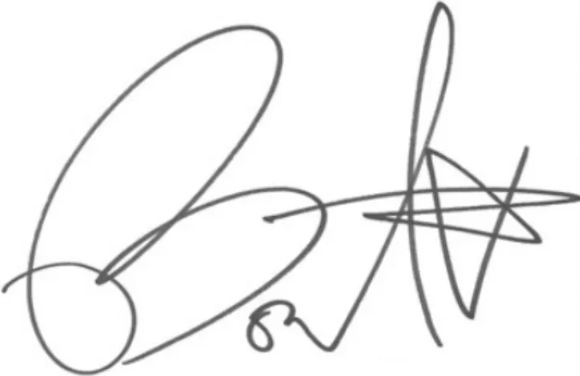

Yoon Bo-ra (Korean: 윤보라; born December 30, 1989), better known by the mononym Bora, is a South Korean singer, rapper, and actress. She is a former member of the South Korean girl group Sistar and its sub-group Sistar19.

== Early life and education ==
Bora was born on December 30, 1989, in Seoul. She majored in Musical Theater in Myongji University, and graduated in February 2015.

== Career ==
=== 2010–2011: Sistar and Sistar19 ===
In June 2010, Bora made her debut as a member of Sistar on KBS' Music Bank with their debut single, Push Push.

In 2011, Bora and group member Hyolyn formed as a sub-group Sistar19 with the single "Ma Boy".

=== 2011–2013: Variety programs ===
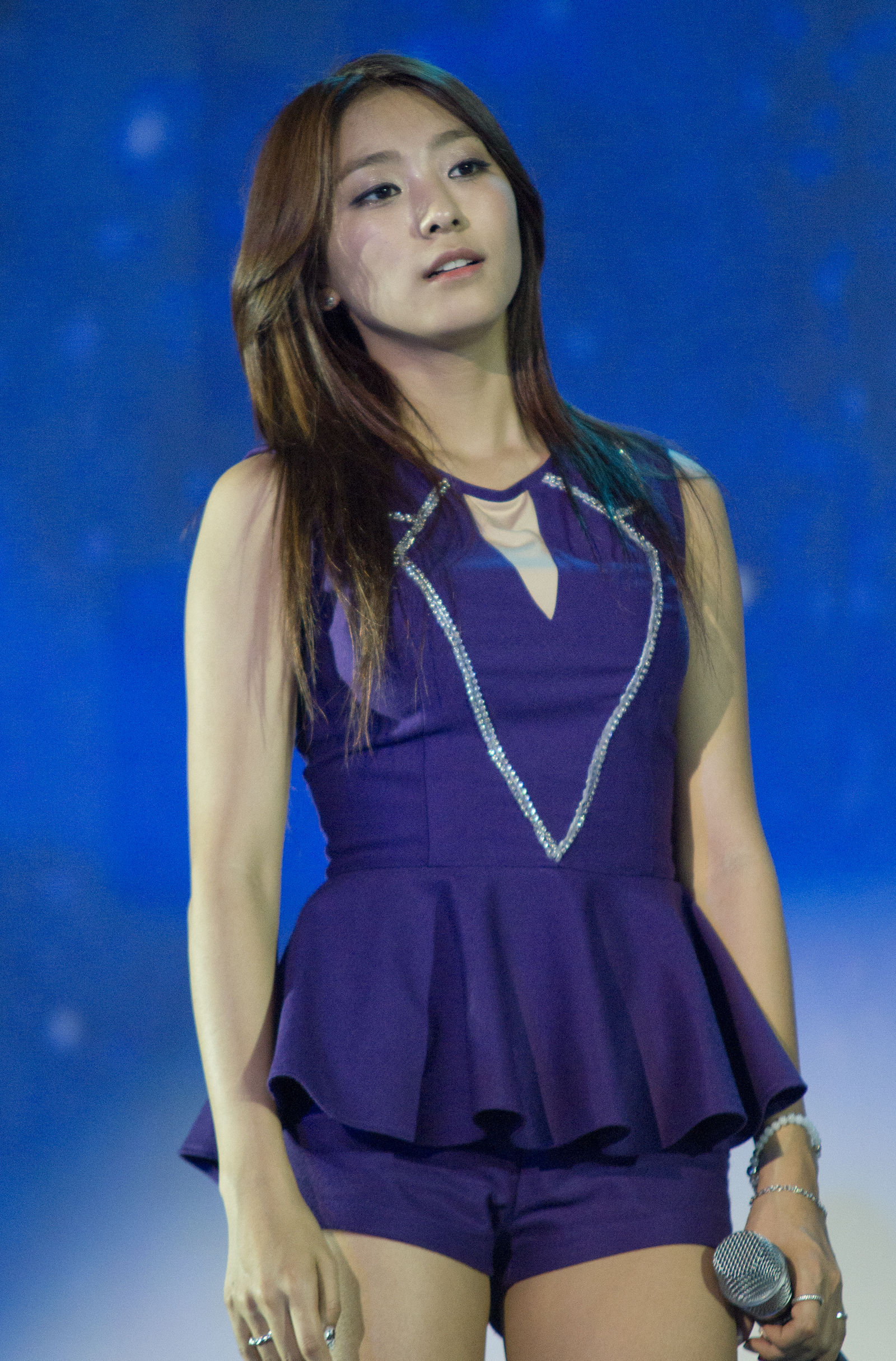
Yoon in 2013

On October 17, 2011, it was revealed that Bora would be part of the new season of KBS2's Invincible Youth. The first episode of Invincible Youth 2 aired on November 11.

On October 21, 2012, it was revealed that Bora would join one of four groups that would perform a new song for the SBS' Gayo Daejeon music spectacular. As part of Mystic White, Bora released the charity song "Mermaid Princess" on December 26, 2012.

In 2013, Bora joined SBS's fashion program Fashion King Korea, where the cast members would team up with professional fashion designers to design and produce fashion items. The same year, she was announced as a fixed host for KBS' music program Music Bank alongside Park Seo-joon. On December 21, 2013, Bora won Best Rookie Award at the 2013 KBS Entertainment Awards for her work in Music Bank.

=== 2014–2017: Television show and series appearances and contract end ===
In 2014, Bora made her acting debut in medical drama Doctor Stranger.

In January 2015, Bora was the new MC for KBS2's fashion and beauty show, A Style For You together with Heechul, Hara, and Hani. In April, she collaborated with Unpretty Rapstar contestants Kisum, Lil Cham, Jace, and male artist Adoonga for a hip-hop single titled "Feedback". She then starred in web dramas, Flatterer and High-End Crush. In November 2015, Bora joined the cast of SBS' survival show Law of the Jungle.

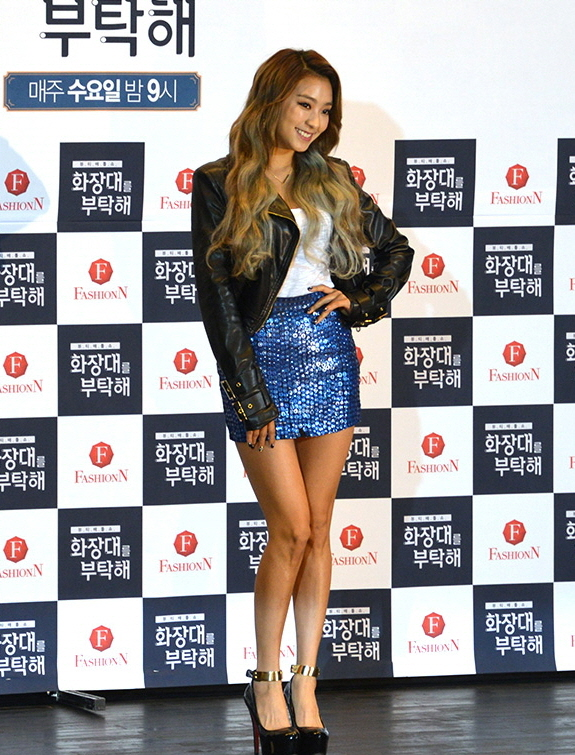
Yoon in 2015

In June 2016, Bora was a contestant of Mnet's dance competition show, Hit the Stage.

In March 2017, it was announced that Bora would make her big screen debut in the family comedy film Sunkist Family. In June 2017, Bora signed a contract under Hook Entertainment as an actress going by her full name, leaving Starship Entertainment after seven years of being in Sistar. In November 2017, Bora was cast in tvN's fantasy drama A Korean Odyssey.

=== 2018–2022: Special MC, television show, series appearance and new label ===
In July 2018, Bora appeared as the special MC for Produce 48 on episode 6 and 7. She also appeared as one-day healing mentor on episode 11. In November 2018, Bora was cast in OCN's Quiz of God - Season 5 : Reboot.

In January 2020, Bora was cast in SBS' Dr. Romantic Season 2. In August 2020, It was revealed that Bora has left Hook Entertainment and signed with KeyEast Entertainment. In October 2020, Bora was announced as the ambassador of AIA Vitality. In November 2020, it was announced that Bora was cast in MBC's Late Night Café Season 2, Hit Up! Hit Up! as the female lead.

In January 2021, it was revealed that Bora will be the host for GlanceTV's beauty show, Unnie's Beauty Carpool together with Hyoyeon.

=== 2023–present: Sistar19 reunion ===
In December 2023, Bora joined the global platform Dear U Bubble where artist and fans can share private messages.

== Other ventures ==
=== Ambassadorship ===
In 2012, Bora was honored as an ambassador for her hometown, Ansan City, and was appointed to be the Green Campus Ambassador for Gyeonggi-do.

In 2015, Bora served as the Emergency Medical Ambassador for the Ministry of Health and Welfare. She was also designated the ambassador for AIA Life's AIA Vitality program in 2020.

=== Endorsement ===
Brand	Year	Product	Note	Ref.
Hyundai Motor	2012	Veloster Turbo	Automobile	
Huons	2012	Hemoramine	Film-type iron powder	
Clarisonic	2014	Vibrating cleanser	Cleansing device	
Aioli	2014	Plastic Island	Clothes	
Adidas	2014	Energy Boost	Sports	
Clio	2017	Mad Matte	Cosmetics	
Sonia	2018	Rome Story	Clothes	

== Discography ==
=== Singles ===
==== As lead artist ====
List of singles as lead artist, showing year released, selected chart positions, and name of the album
Title	Year	Peak chart positions	Sales (DL)	Album
Title	Year	KOR	Sales (DL)	Album
"Mermaid Princess" (with Jiyoung, Sunhwa, Gayoon and Lizzy)	2012	10	KOR: 183,655+	2012 SBS 가요대전 The Color of K-Pop 'Mystic White'
"Feedback" (with Kisum, Lil Cham, Jace and I.M)	2015	18	KOR: 96,633+	Non-album single

==== As featured artist ====
List of singles as featured artist, showing year released, selected chart positions, and name of the album
Title	Year	Peak chart positions	Album
Title	Year	KOR Down.	Album
"Aloha" (Soyou feat. Bora)	2023	27	Summer Recipe

== Filmography ==
=== Film ===
Year	Title	Role	Ref.
2019	Sunkist Family	Kyung-Joo	

=== Television series ===
Year	Title	Role	Notes	Ref.
2007	Opposites Attract	Tapdance academy student	Special appearance	
2012	Family	Herself	Cameo	
2014	Doctor Stranger	Lee Chang-yi		
2015	The Flatterer	Bong-hee		
2015	High-End Crush	Min-joo		
2016	What Happened at the Airport	Herself		
2017	Irish Uppercut	Do Hae-na		
2017	A Korean Odyssey	Alice / Jade Dragon		
2018	Gangnam Beauty	Model	Cameo (episode 5)	
2018	Quiz of God 5: Reboot	Jang Seung-bin	Researcher in CODAS	
2019	Worth Waiting for Dating	Kang Bo-ram		
2019–2020	Chocolate	Hui Na	Cameo (episodes 13, 15–16)	
2020–2023	Dr. Romantic	Joo Young-mi	Season 2–3	
2021	Hip Up! Hit Up!	Son A-young		
2021	Dramaworld	Soldier	Special appearance	
2021–2022	The One and Only	Veronica		
2022	O'PENing: "Stock of High School"	Son Do-wan's homeroom teacher	Cameo (season 5)	
2023	Pale Moon	Lee Ru-ri		

=== Television show ===
Year	Title	Notes	Ref.
2011	Man Reading Baseball	Season 2, with Heo Il-hoo	
2011–2012	Invincible Youth Season 2	Series regular	
2012–2013	Park Sangmyeon's Radio King	With Kim Hwan and Yoon Da-young	
2013	Fashion King Korea	Contestant, runner-up	
2015	A Style For You	With Kim Hee-chul, Goo Hara, and Hani	
2015–2016	Take Care of My Dressing Table	With Han Chae-young and Choi Hee	
2016	Hit the Stage	Contestant	
2016	Law of the Jungle	Cast member in Panama	
2019	Law of the Jungle	Cast member in Tasman Islands	
2021	Unnie's Beauty Carpool	With Hyoyeon	
2021	Happy Beauty Day	With Park Sol-mi and Jo Yeon-woo	
2022	Jump Like a Witch	Cast member	

=== Music video appearances ===
Year	Song title	Artist	Ref.
2011	"Boyfriend"	Boyfriend	
2012	"I Need You"	K.Will	
2012	"Because I Love You"	Lee Seok-heon	
2015	"Wet"	Jooyoung	
2016	"Drive"	Jay Park	

=== Hosting ===
Year	Title	Notes	Ref.
2013–2015	Music Bank	With Park Seo-joon	
2014	Korea-China Song Festival	With Jo Woo-jong, Zhu Xun, and Terry Lin	
2016	Quiz on Korea	With Lee Hwi-jae	
2018	Produce 48	Special MC	

== Awards and nominations ==
Name of the award ceremony, year presented, category, nominee of the award, and the result of the nomination
Award ceremony	Year	Category	Nominee / Work	Result	Ref.
KBS Entertainment Awards	2013	Best Rookie Award	Music Bank	Won	
