= Hani (singer) =

South Korean singer and actress (born 1992)

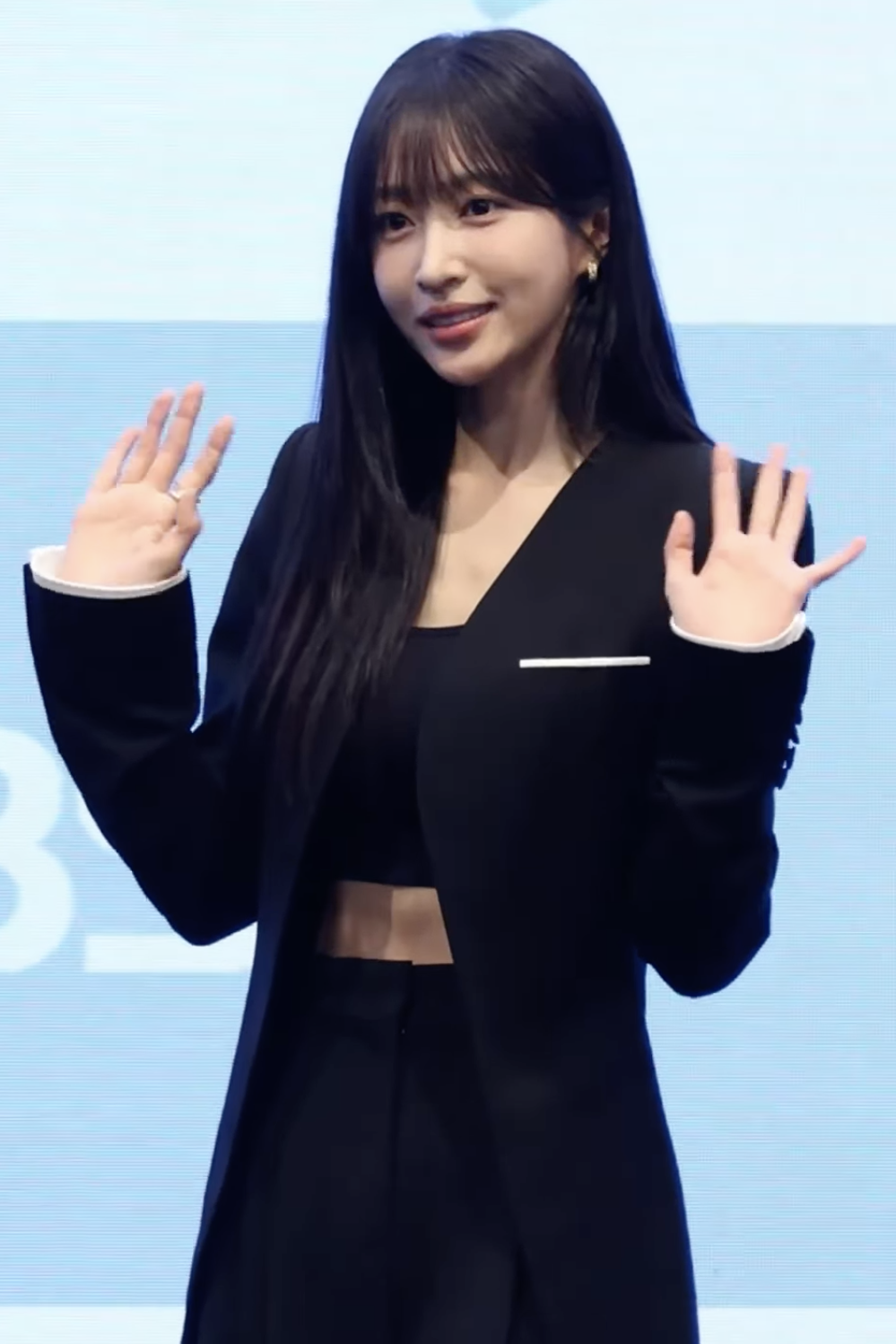
- Hani in 2026
- Born: Ahn Hee-yeon; May 1, 1992 (age 34); Seoul, South Korea
- Education: Global Cyber University
- Occupations: Singer; actress
- Years active: 2012–present
- Agent: Sublime
- Musical career
- Genre: K-pop
- Instrument: Vocals
- Label: Banana Culture
- Member of: EXID; SoljiHani

Korean name
- Hangul: 안희연
- Hanja: 安喜延
- RR: An Huiyeon
- MR: An Hŭiyŏn

Stage name
- Hangul: 하니
- RR: Hani
- MR: Hani
- Website: sublimeartist.co.kr

Signature
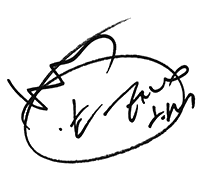

Ahn Hee-yeon (Korean: 안희연; born May 1, 1992), known professionally as Hani (하니), is a South Korean singer and actress. She is known as a member of the South Korean girl group EXID and its subgroup, SoljiHani (formerly known as Dasoni (다소니)). She has appeared on television as a host on Weekly Idol and a cast member on Off to School, Crime Scene and A Style for You.

== Early life ==
Ahn Hee-yeon was born on May 1, 1992, in Seoul, South Korea, but her family and friends all called her Hani from a young age. She competed in triathlons from elementary until middle school, and was also an avid swimmer. She is the sister of actor Ahn Tae Hwan.

Prior to her debut with EXID, she was originally set to debut as a member of a girl group under JYP Entertainment, along with Sistar's Hyolyn, Secret's Song Ji-eun and Bestie's Uji. However, she was cut from JYP after a year. Hani stated that the company did not see potential in her. Following this, she went to study abroad in China for a year.

== Career ==
=== 2012–13: Debut with EXID and rise to popularity ===
EXID officially debuted on February 15, 2012, with the release of their debut single, "Whoz That Girl".

In February 2013, Hani and EXID member Heo Sol-ji formed the duo Dasoni and released their debut single "Goodbye" on February 15, 2013. It also included the B-side, "Said So Often".

In August 2014, EXID released their single "Up & Down". Initially, the song charted poorly, failing to make it on the top 100 of the Gaon Chart. However, the song slowly gained popularity in late November after a fan-taken video of Hani performing the song went viral. As of 2019, the video has been viewed more than 30 million times on YouTube.

=== 2014–present: Solo career ===
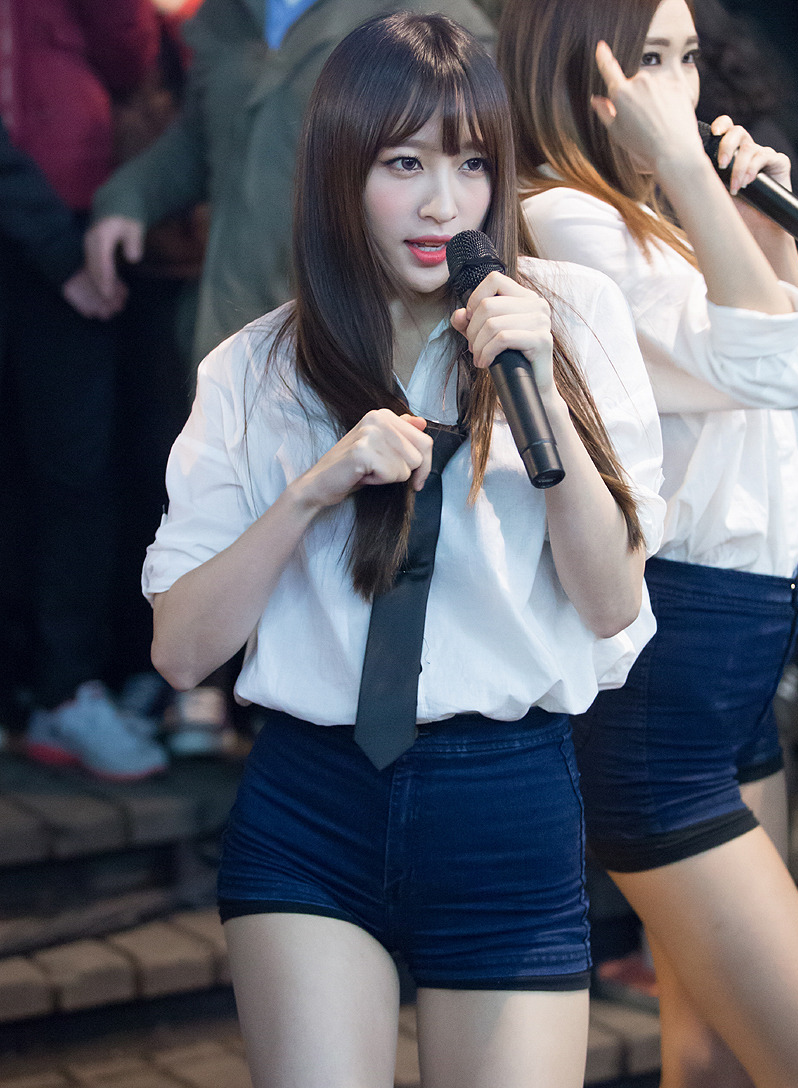
Hani performing in November 2014

In 2014, she entered the main cast of tvN's Always Cantare.

In 2015, she appeared in Mad Clown's music video for "Fire", and entered the main cast of JTBC's Off to School and Crime Scene. Hani was also chosen to present a new KBS beauty show, A Style For You along with Kim Heechul, Goo Ha-ra and Yoon Bora. In spring, she appeared on Soulmates Returns. Later on, she made a cameo appearance in The Producers as herself. On June 24, she and Ken of VIXX released a duet song titled "Gap". In September, she was made a cast member in TV series Law of the Jungle.

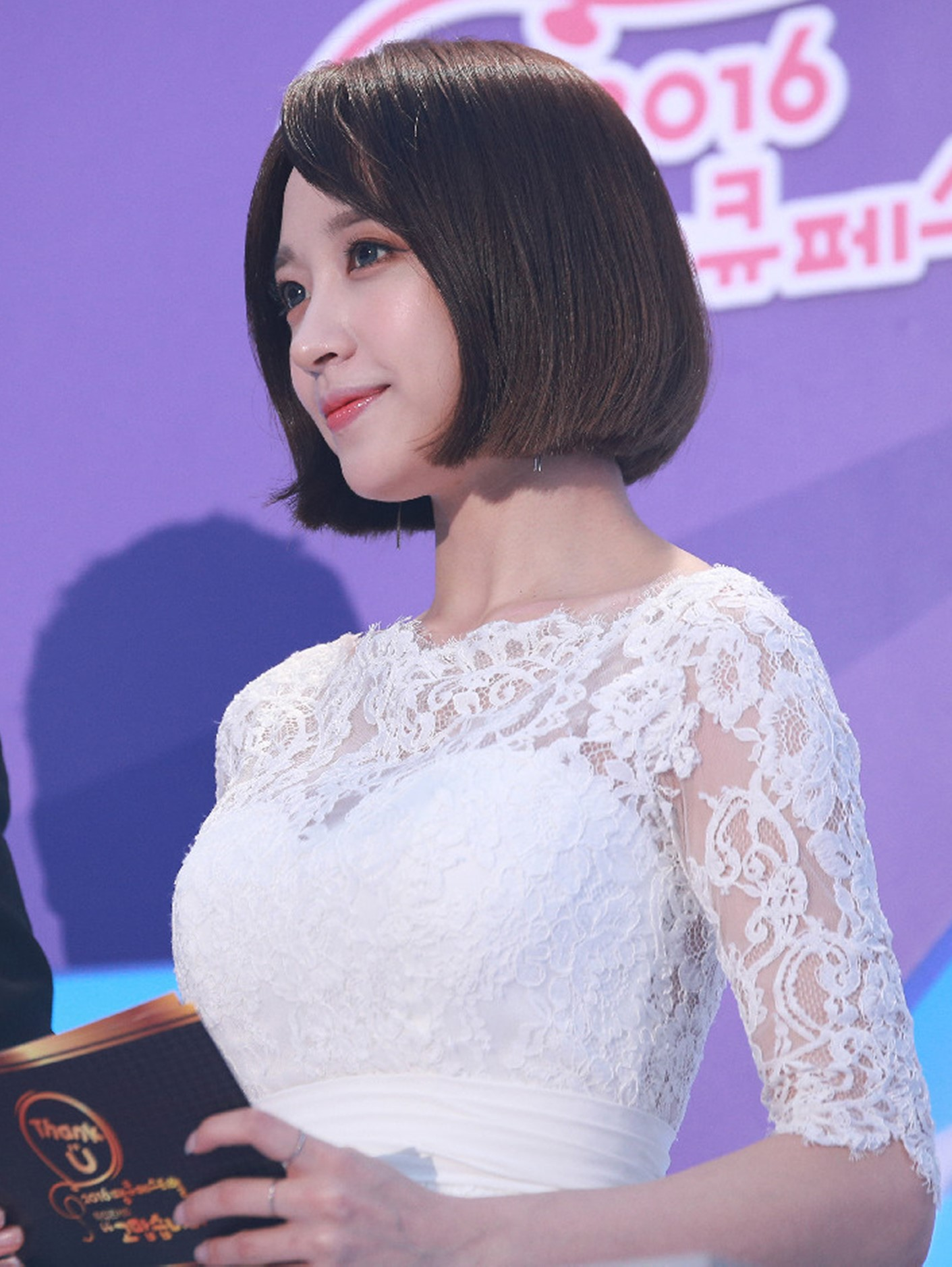
Hani in June 2016

In 2016, Hani became the co-host of Baek Jong-won's Three Great Emperors. In February 2016, she appeared on King of Mask Singer as "Little Match Girl", a get-up completed with a mask and costumes to hide her identity. Hani surprised the panel of judges and an audience with her rich and husky voice (mostly due to the higher vocal range used as a vocalist in EXID). Hani defeated Kim Feel and Jo Hang-jo but she was subsequently defeated by the Mask King at the time, Ha Hyun-woo of Guckkasten. Nevertheless, Hani's performances attracted attention and recognition for her unique vocal and passion for singing.

On January 12, 2017, it was announced that f(x)'s Luna, Hani, and Mamamoo's Solar would release a collaborative dance song on January 19, produced by Park Geun-tae, who also wrote Exo's Baekhyun and Miss A's Suzy's duet "Dream". It was later revealed that the song's title is "Honey Bee", and is of the pop soul genre, incorporating 808 bass and saxophone. On January 19, the song "Honey Bee" was officially released on Mystic Entertainment's YouTube channel.

In May 2019, Banana Culture announced that Hani and Jeonghwa would not be renewing their contracts, and EXID would go on hiatus after finishing their tour in Japan.

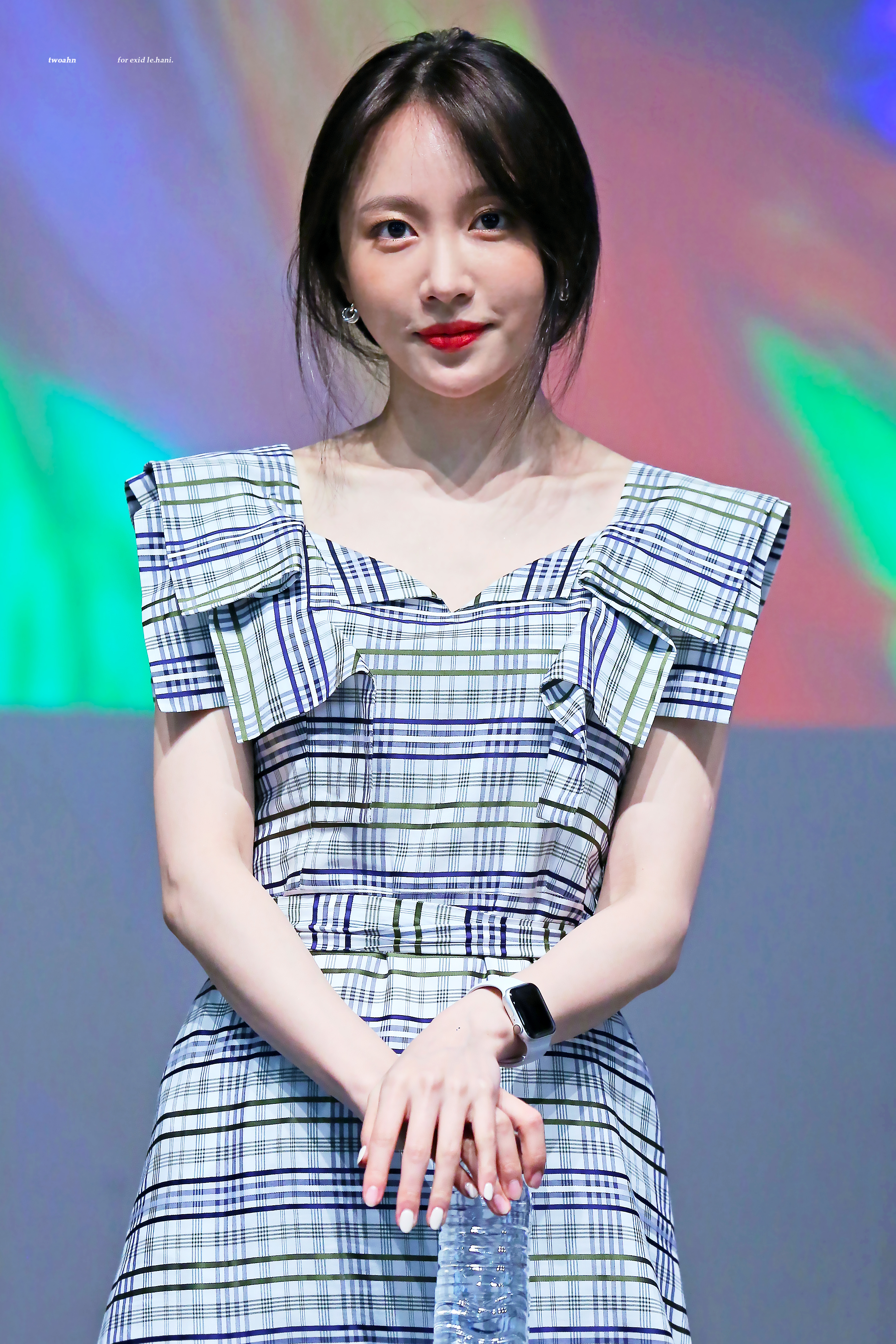
Hani in May 2019

In October 2019 it was announced that Hani has signed with Sublime Artist Agency and that she would be making her film debut with her given name Ahn Hee-yeon.

On January 21, 2020, Hani was announced to star in the web drama XX. The drama's first episode aired on January 24 and ran for 10 episodes.

On August 11, 2020, Hani was announced to be starring in another web drama, How to Be Thirty, alongside Jung In-sun, Kang Min-hyuk, Song Jae-rim, Cha Min-ji, and Baek Sung-chul. It premiered on KakaoTV on February 23, 2021, with new episodes being released every Tuesday and Friday.

On July 20, 2021, Hani was set to star in JTBC's upcoming series, Idol: The Coup, but due to her being tested positive for COVID-19, production was postponed until further notice. The drama is scheduled to air starting on November 8, 2021.

== Personal life ==
On June 29, 2022, the agency confirmed that Hani has been in a relationship with psychiatrist Yang Jae-woong for 2 years. On June 1, 2024, Hani made an announcement on Instagram that the couple would be getting married. However, on September 3, 2024, the wedding was postponed indefinite, following a fatal patient incident at the hospital.

== Discography ==
List of singles as lead artist, with selected chart positions and sales figures, showing year released and album name
Title	Year	Peak chart positions		Sales	Album
Title	Year	KOR Gaon	US World	Sales	Album
"Cold" (with C-Clown)	2012	—	—	—N/a	Young Love
"We Got The World" (with R.Tee)	2014	—	—	—N/a	Non-album singles
"Fake Illness" (with Rare Potato)	2015	—	—	—N/a	Non-album singles
"Gap" (with Ken)	2015	25	—	KOR (DL): 93,000+*	Non-album singles
"Snail" (달팽이) (with Kim Feel)	2016	—	—	—N/a	King of Mask Singer Episode 47
"Honey" (with Ken)	2016	—	—	—N/a	King of Mask Singer Episode 48
"Honey Bee" (with f(x)'s Luna and Mamamoo's Solar)	2017	38	—	KOR (DL): 63,673+	Non-album singles
"Flame" (with Solji)	2017	—	—	—N/a	Money Flower OST
"—" denotes releases that did not chart or were not released in that region. "*" indicates that the Gaon Chart was revamped at this time and digital sales were deflated.

== Filmography ==
=== Film ===
Year	Title	Role	Notes	Ref.
2016	Take Off 2	Lee Bo-mi	Cameo	
2021	Young Adult Matters	Joo-young	Independent film	
2021	Dream Builder	Narrator	barrier-free version	

=== Television series ===
Year	Title	Role	Notes	Ref.
2015	The Producers	Herself	Cameo (Episode 3)	
2020	SF8	Juno	Episode: "White Crow"	
2020	The Spies Who Loved Me	Hacker	Cameo (Episode 8–9)	
2021	Idol: The Coup	Kim Je-na		
2022	Ghost Doctor	Lee Ji-woo / Jessica	Cameo	
2026	Love on the Menu	Han Gyu-rim		

=== Web series ===
Year	Title	Role	Ref.
2020	XX	Yoon Na-na	
2021	How to Be Thirty	Lee Ran-joo	
2021	You Raise Me Up	Lee Lu-da	
2022–2023	Fantasy Spot	Hee-jae	
2023	Call lt Love	Kang Min-yeong	

=== Television shows ===
Year	Title	Role	Notes	Ref.
2014	Always Cantare	Cast member		
2015	Crime Scene 2	Cast member		
2015	A Style For You	Cast member	With Yoon Bo-ra, Goo Hara and Kim Heechul	
2015	Soulmates Returns	Cast member		
2015	EXID's Showtime	Cast member		
2015	Law of the Jungle in Nicaragua	Cast member	Episodes 178–180	
2016	Baek Jong-won's Three Great Emperors	Co-host	Episodes 22–51	
2016	We Are Siblings	Cast member	with her younger brother	
2016	King of Mask Singer	Contestant	as "Be Careful for Cold the Little Match Girl" (Episodes 47–48)	
2016	Weekly Idol	Host	Episodes 245–270	
2017	Suddenly A Millionaire	Host		
2017	Law of the Jungle in Komodo	Cast member	Episodes 274–278	
2018	Secret Unnie	Cast member	with Yoojung (Weki Meki)	
2020	Law of the Jungle in Palawan	Cast member	Episodes 403-406	
2020	Running Girls	Cast member		
2021	Soo Mi's Mountain Cabin	Cast member		
2021	Magic Wardrobe	Host		
2021	Fruit of Love	Narrator		

=== Web shows ===
Year	Title	Role	Ref.
2022	Mary Queer	Host	

== Theater ==
Theater play performances of Hani
Year	Title		Role	Venue	Date	Ref.
Year	English	Korean	Role	Venue	Date	Ref.
2023	3 Days of Rain	3일간의 비	Nan / Laina	Dongguk University Lee Haerang Arts Theater	July 25 to October 1	

== Accolades ==
=== Awards and nominations ===
Name of the award ceremony, year presented, category, nominee of the award, and the result of the nomination
Award ceremony	Year	Category	Nominee / Work	Result	Ref.
Blue Dragon Series Awards	2023	Best New Actress	Hit the Spot	Nominated	
Brand Customer Loyalty Awards	2019	Variety Idol	Hani	Won	
Buil Film Awards	2021	Best New Actress	Young Adult Matters	Nominated	
Korea Cable TV Awards	2017	Rising Star, MC	Hani	Won	

=== Listicles ===
Name of publisher, year listed, name of listicle, and placement
Publisher	Year	Listicle	Placement	Ref.
Forbes	2016	Korea Power Celebrity 40	37th	
