= It's Me (EP) =

EP by Hyolyn
- Released: November 8, 2016
- Genre: Dance-pop; R&B
- Length: 20:16
- Language: Korean
- Label: Starship; LOEN

Hyolyn chronology
Love & Hate (2013)	It's Me (2016)	Say My Name (2020)

Singles from It's Me
- 1. "Love Like This" Released: October 25, 2016; 2. "One Step" Released: October 31, 2016; 3. "Paradise" Released: November 8, 2016

It's Me is the debut extended play by South Korean singer Hyolyn and second music release after her album Love & Hate in 2013. The album was released on November 8, 2016, by Starship Entertainment and distributed by LOEN Entertainment.

== Background and release ==
On October 11, 2016, it was announced that Hyolyn would make a comeback after three years since her last album. Starship Entertainment released news of the singer's comeback, with a message including a special image that revealed the upcoming schedule for her comeback. The teaser image included a featuring with Dok2 and Jay Park. It was revealed that Hyolyn will go with more Hip-hop style, unlike her previous releases. Later a concept photos were released.

On October 21, a teaser was released for the first single featuring Dok2, the single was released on October 25. On October 27, another teaser for the second single was released, while the single released on October 31. On November 3, the third photo concept were released, the next day a teaser for third single "Paradise" was released. The music video was released on November 8.

== Track listing ==
No.	Title	Lyrics	Music	Length
1.	"Paradise"	Sunwoo Jung-a	Park Geun-tae; Jin Suk Choi; Anne Judith Wik; Ronny Vidar Svendsen	3:24
2.	"Love Like This" (featuring Dok2)	Hyolyn; Brother Su; Dok2	Prince Charlez; The LabRatz	3:31
3.	"One Step" (featuring Jay Park)	Hyolyn; Brother Su; Jay Park	Jany Schella; Erik Lidbom; Andreas Oberg; Melanie Joy Fontana	3:16
4.	"Go Away" (꺼져)	Hyolyn; Brother Su; Deekei	Cam O`bi; Nascent; Bibi Bourelly; Deekei	3:07
5.	"Slow" (featuring Jooheon of Monsta X)	Hyolyn; Super Cheongdam; Jooheon	Hyolyn; Super Cheongdam	3:46
6.	"Dope"	Hyolyn; Brother Su	Joonas Laaksoharju; Da-kyung Lee; Deekei	3:10
Total length:				20:16

== Chart performance ==
Chart	Peak position
Gaon Weekly album chart	15
Gaon Monthly album chart	39

== Sales ==
Chart	Amount
Gaon physical sales	3,478

== Release history ==
Country	Date	Format	Label
South Korea	November 8, 2016	CD, digital download	Starship Entertainment LOEN Entertainment
Various	November 8, 2016	Digital download	Starship Entertainment LOEN Entertainment
