= Ma Boy =

Sistar19 single

Single by Sistar19

from the album Gone Not Around Any Longer
- Released: May 3, 2011
- Recorded: 2011
- Genre: K-pop
- Length: 3:17
- Label: Starship
- Songwriter: Brave Brothers
- Producer: Brave Brothers

Sistar19 singles chronology
"Ma Boy" (2011)	"Gone Not Around Any Longer" (2013)

Music video
- "Ma Boy" on YouTube

"Ma Boy" is the first single by Sistar19, a sub-unit of South Korean girl group Sistar. It was released online as a digital single on May 3, 2011, through Starship Entertainment. The song was a commercial success, peaking at number 2 on the Gaon Digital Chart. The song has sold over 2,652,474 downloads as of 2011.

== Background and release ==
On April 28, 2011, Starship Entertainment announced the creation of a Sistar sub-unit called Sistar19, which includes main vocalist Hyolyn and rapper Bora. The same day, Sistar19 released the music video teaser for their first single, "Ma Boy".

The single was released on digital music sites on May 3, 2011. Written by producer Brave Brothers, "Ma Boy" is a medium tempo neo soul song with lyrics that express the emotions of a girl in love.

A special version of "Ma Boy", featuring Sistar members Soyou and Dasom, was included on Sistar's first full-length album, So Cool, released on August 9, 2011. The original version of the song was included in Sistar19's first extended play, Gone Not Around Any Longer, released on January 31, 2013.

== Commercial performance ==
"Ma Boy" entered at number 5 on the Gaon Digital Chart on the chart issue dated May 1–7, 2011, with 291,397 downloads sold and 1,249,909 streams. In its second week, the song climbed to number 3 and peaked at number 2 in its third week. The song entered at number 2 on the Gaon Digital Chart for the month of May 2011, with 1,372,864 downloads sold and 12,625,061 streams. It also charted at number 21 for the month of June and at number 65 for the month of July. The song placed at number 14 on the Gaon Digital Chart for the year 2011, with 2,652,474 downloads sold and 21,560,202 streams accumulated.

== Music video and promotion ==
The music video for "Ma Boy" features Hyloyn and Bora dressed as "racing models", dancing next to sports cars. The video was directed by Joo Hee-sun. Sistar19 also released a dance practice video for "Ma Boy" on May 13, 2011. The video showcases the song's popular "chair dance" and "glamour dance" choreography.

Sistar19 had their debut performance on M Countdown on May 5, 2011. The group also performed "Ma Boy" on various music shows such as Music Bank, Show! Music Core and Inkigayo in May and April.

== Track listing ==
Digital download / streaming

1. "Ma Boy" – 3:17
2. "Ma Boy" (Instrumental) – 3:17

== Charts ==
=== Weekly charts ===
Chart (2011)	Peak position
South Korea (Gaon)	2

=== Monthly charts ===
Chart (2011)	Peak position
South Korea (Gaon)	2

=== Year-end charts ===
Chart (2011)	Position
South Korea (Gaon)	14

== Credits and personnel ==
- Hyorin – vocals
- Bora – vocals, rap
- Brave Brothers – producing, songwriting, arranger, music
