= Say My Name (Hyolyn EP) =

EP by Hyolyn
- Released: August 19, 2020
- Recorded: 2018–2020
- Genre: K-pop
- Length: 20:50
- Language: Korean
- Label: bridʒ

Hyolyn chronology
It's Me (2016)	Say My Name (2020)	Ice (2022)

Singles from Say My Name
- 1. "Dally" Released: April 23, 2018; 2. "See Sea" Released: July 20, 2018; 3. "Bae" Released: August 16, 2018; 4. "9Lives" Released: August 10, 2020; 5. "Say My Name" Released: August 19, 2020

Say My Name is the second extended play by South Korean singer Hyolyn. It was released and distributed on August 19, 2020, by bridʒ Entertainment. The EP was entirely produced by Hyolyn and it features six tracks including the lead single "Say My Name".

== Singles ==
"Dally" is the first single released on 2018. The song peak at number 67 on the Gaon Streaming Chart and number 13 on the Gaon Download Chart.

"See Sea" was the next single release. The song peak at number 71 on the Gaon Streaming Chart and peak at number 42 on the Gaon Download Chart. The song also earned Hyolyn her highest entry on the world digital song sales peaking at number 5.

Special single "Bae" was released after See Sea, the song peak at number 99 on the Gaon Streaming Chart and peak at number 34 on the Gaon Download Chart.

A pre-released music video for "9Lives" was released on August 10, 2020.

"Say My Name" is the title track of the album. The song entered at number 128 on the Gaon Download Chart on the chart issue dated August 16–22, 2020.

== Promotions ==
The singles Dally, See Sea and Bae was promoted by Hyolyn through busking performances on Hongdae, Gangnam Square, Bupyeong and Caribbean Bay.

"See Sea" was promoted once on KBS's Music Bank on July 27, 2018.

"9Lives" was first performed on Mnet's Good Girl. It was also performed on M Countdown on the same channel on August 20, 2020 and on MBC's Music Core on August 29, 2020.

The promotion of the song "Say My Name" started on August 20, 2020 on Mnet's M Countdown followed by performances on MBC's Music Core & Show Champion.

== Commercial performance ==
Say My Name entered and peak at number 19 on the Gaon Album Chart on the chart issue dated August 23–29, 2020.

== Track listing ==
Say My Name (album) track list
No.	Title	Length
1.	"Morning Call"	3:31
2.	"SAY MY NAME"	3:26
3.	"DALLY"	3:23
4.	"SEE SEA"	3:20
5.	"BAE"	3:27
6.	"9LIVES"	3:23
Total length:		20:50

== Charts ==
Chart performance of Say My Name
Chart (2020)	Peak position
South Korean Albums (Gaon)	19

=== GAON Download chart ===
Chart	Title	Peak position
Gaon Weekly download chart	Dally	61
Gaon Weekly download chart	Sea Sea	71
Gaon Weekly download chart	Bae	99
Gaon Weekly download chart	9Lives	—
Gaon Weekly download chart	Say My Name	—

== Release history ==
Release history of Say My Name
Country	Date	Format	Label
South Korea	August 24, 2020	Digital download; streaming	bridʒ Entertainment
South Korea	August 24, 2020	CD	bridʒ Entertainment

== See also ==
- List of Gaon Album Chart number ones of 2020
