= Goo Hara =

South Korean singer and actress (1991–2019)

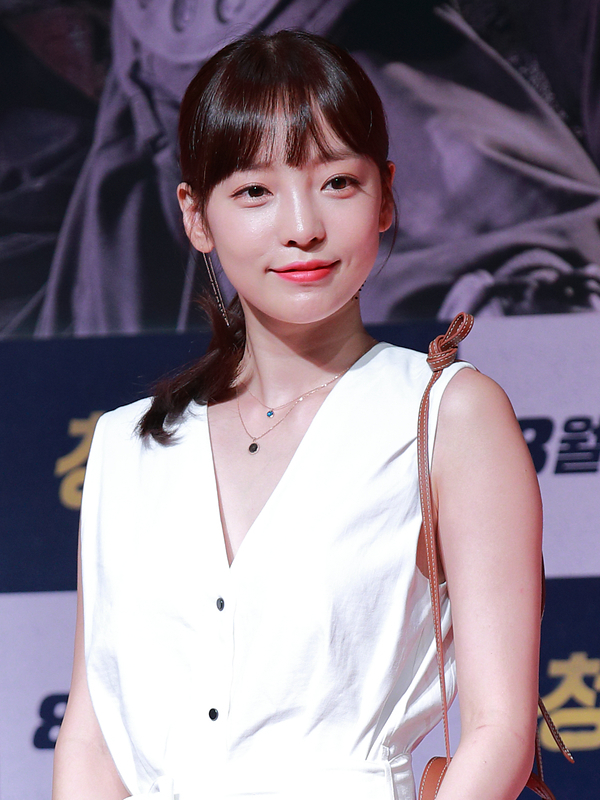
- Goo at the Midnight Runners premiere in 2017
- Born: January 3, 1991; Kwangju, South Korea
- Died: November 24, 2019 (aged 28); Seoul, South Korea
- Cause of death: Suicide by hanging
- Resting place: Skycastle Memorial Park Gwangju, South Korea
- Occupations: Singer; actress
- Years active: 2008–2019
- Agents: KeyEast; Ogi
- Musical career
- Genre: K-pop
- Instrument: Vocals
- Label: DSP
- Formerly of: Kara

Korean name
- Hangul: 구하라
- RR: Gu Hara
- MR: Ku Hara

Goo Hara (/ˈɡuːhɑːrə/; Korean: 구하라; January 3, 1991 – November 24, 2019), also known mononymously as Hara, was a South Korean singer and actress. She was a member of the K-pop girl group Kara, and had also appeared in television dramas including City Hunter (2011). She made her debut as a soloist in July 2015 with the release of her EP Alohara (Can You Feel It?). After Kara disbanded in 2016, she continued her solo career at another agency, KeyEast. In June 2019, she signed with Production Ogi and continued her solo activities in Japan where she was well received by fans. Her last release was maxi single "Midnight Queen" on September 19, 2019. In November 2019, she embarked on a Japanese mini tour to support the album.

Goo was found dead at her home in Seoul on November 24, 2019, aged 28. Her death was ruled a suicide. Leading to her death, Goo had experienced multiple traumatic events: a legal battle with her ex-boyfriend, Choi Jong-Bum, who assaulted Goo in 2018 and threatened to release a sex video of them; constant harassment from part of the Korean public, aimed at making K-pop idols conform to a strict moral code; and the suicide of her close friend Sulli, who suffered similar public scrutiny, a month prior to her own death.

Goo's death was followed by calls for reform, including petitions submitted to the Cheong Wa Dae regarding sex crimes, cyberbullying, and South Korean inheritance law. It was later disclosed that Goo had a pivotal role in leading her friend Choi Jong-hoon to reveal the identity of a corrupt police officer who had protected members (including Choi himself) of the KakaoTalk chatrooms, which shared rape videos.

== Life and career ==
=== Early life and education ===
Goo Hara was born on January 3, 1991, in Gwangju, South Korea. Goo's parents separated when she was eight years old after her mother abandoned the family. Goo and her brother were raised by their grandmother while their father was working as a construction worker around the country to support the family. She attended Woonchun Elementary School and Jeonnam Middle School, and trained as a track and field athlete for two years.

Goo came to Seoul while attending Jeonju Fine Arts High School and participated in SM Entertainment's youth appearance tournament in 2005. She later transferred to Dongmyung Girls' Information Industry High School and then attended Sungshin Women's University. During her school days, she worked as a model for internet clothing stores. In 2007, she unsuccessfully auditioned to join JYP Entertainment.

=== 2008–2015: Kara ===
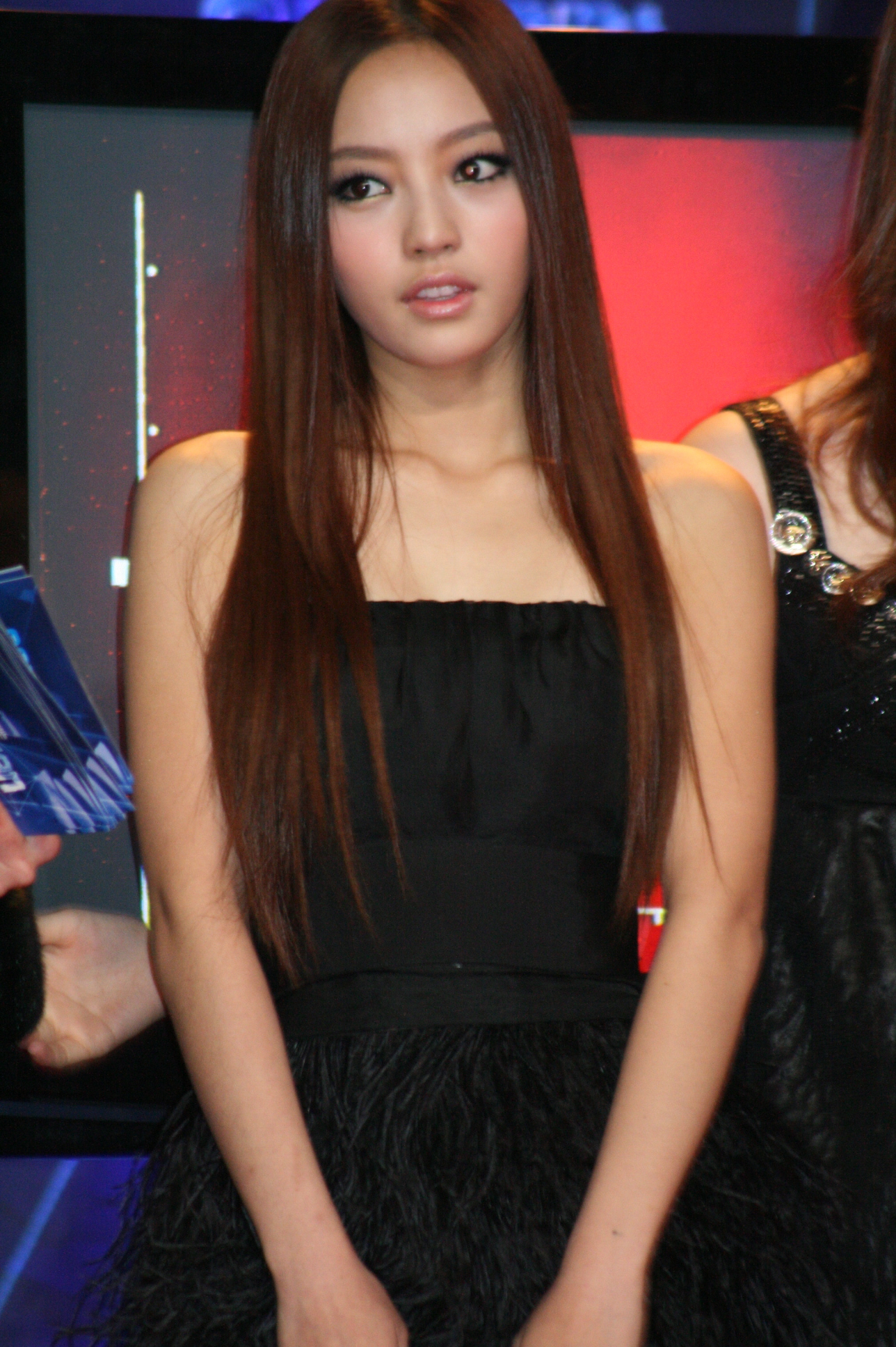
Goo in 2009

Goo joined the girl group Kara in 2008, following the departure of former member Kim Sung-hee. In October 2009, she became a cast member of the KBS reality show Invincible Youth. On January 5, 2010, during an appearance on the SBS reality show Strong Heart, Goo admitted that she had had dental and minor facial cosmetic surgery. She stated that she had always had double eyelids, but had surgery to make them more defined.

In 2011, Goo made her acting debut in SBS City Hunter, where she starred as Choi Da-hye, the daughter of South Korea's president. On January 19, 2011, it was announced that Goo would be terminating her contract with her label DSP Media along with three other members of Kara, and a lawsuit was filed on their behalf. Later that day, it was announced that she would discontinue her involvement with the suit and had rejoined the company, as she apparently was not fully aware of the lawsuit's details. In November 2011, she and Nicole Jung (a fellow member of Kara) became the new MCs for Inkigayo, and they left the show on August 19, 2012, to focus on Kara's comeback.

In 2013, Goo collaborated with Japanese musician and songwriter Masaharu Fukuyama to record a song called "Magic of Love" in Korean under the project group, Hara+. The song was used as a soundtrack for FujiTV's drama Galileo, in which Fukuyama starred. In October 2013, she was appointed as the blood donation ambassador for the Hanmaum Blood Bank. On December 29, 2014, she appeared in her own reality show titled On & Off, which aired on MBC Music.

==== Alohara (Can You Feel It) ====
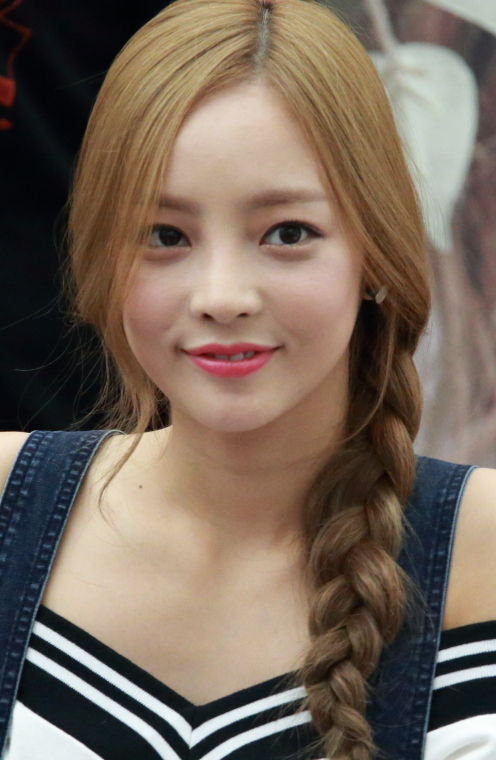
Goo at a fansigning event in 2015

In January 2015, Goo started hosting KBS' idol beauty show A Style For You along with Super Junior's Kim Heechul, EXID's Hani and Sistar's Bora. In June 2015, she released a beauty book titled Nail Hara. In July 2015, Goo debuted as a solo artist with the release of the EP Alohara (Can You Feel It?), which peaked at #4 domestically. The lead single "Choco Chip Cookies" features South Korean rapper Giriboy. In October 2015, Goo joined the variety show Shaolin Clenched Fists.

=== 2016–2019: Final projects before death ===
On January 15, 2016, Kara disbanded due to Goo and fellow members Park Gyu-ri and Han Seung-yeon leaving DSP Media upon the expiration of their contracts with the company. Goo then signed with KeyEast a few days later to pursue a solo career. In December 2016, she featured in Thunder's single, "Sign". In August 2017, Goo starred in a web movie titled Sound of a Footstep. In November 2017, she joined the variety show Seoul Mate.

In January 2018, Goo released a soundtrack for the drama Jugglers, titled "On A Good Day". In April 2018, she hosted the JTBC's beauty show My Mad Beauty Diary. In July, she was named honorary ambassador for the 6th Animal Film Festival. In August 2018, Goo debuted as a soloist in Japan, releasing the song "Wild". Beginning in October 2018, Goo and her ex-boyfriend, Choi Jong-bum, became involved in a legal dispute that extended into 2019. The nature of the dispute caused issues in both her professional and personal life, including Content Y (a subsidiary of KeyEast that Goo had been actively promoting under since 2017), declining to renew her contract following its expiration in January 2019.

After being on hiatus for the first half of 2019, it was announced in June 2019 that Goo had signed with Production Ogi to continue her activities in Japan. Goo had previously enjoyed popularity in Japan when Kara was still active and being promoted in Japan, having participated in 62nd NHK Kōhaku Uta Gassen.

Goo's final release prior to her death was the maxi single "Midnight Queen", which was released in September 2019. She also embarked on a mini tour, titled Hara Zepp Tour 2019: Hello, to support the album. The tour consisted of four concert dates held across Japan in November 2019, ending on the 19th. Goo had a successful solo career in Japan and was well received by her Japanese fans during the mini tour.

== Personal life ==
=== Domestic dispute with Choi Jong-Bum ===
Goo dated hairdresser Choi Jong-Bum after the two first met on the set of the beauty TV program My Mad Beauty Diary. At around 1 a.m. of September 13, 2018, a drunken Choi broke into Goo's house while she was sleeping and started an argument that escalated into violent assault, when he allegedly tried to break up with her. The police arrived at Goo's house after Choi reported her for assault. Goo claimed that the incident was two-sided and then both parties posted images of their injuries to the internet to explain their side of the story. On September 17, in an interview given to Korean tabloid outlet Dispatch, Goo claimed that the fight started because of her having lunch with a male acquaintance, which ignited Choi's jealousy.

After the incident, Goo underwent a medical examination and was found to be suffering from uterine and vaginal hemorrhage; she was also diagnosed with "cervical sprain", "facial contusions and sprain", "lower leg contusions and sprain", and "right forearm and additional sprains." Following this, Goo filed a lawsuit against Choi for threatening to release a sex video filmed without her consent in an attempt by him to end her career. Goo pursued the lawsuit despite the initial advice of her lawyers to keep things quiet to avoid public backlash.

In the first trial session held on April 18, 2019, Choi was presented with the charges of filming the sex video, injury, intimidation, coercion, and property damage. Choi denied all charges except destruction of property. On May 26, 2019, Goo attempted suicide in her apartment and was immediately taken to the hospital, after which she apologized for worrying her fans. As a result, Goo did not attend the second trial session on May 30, 2019. She was originally scheduled to appear as a witness in court.

In the third trial session on July 18, 2019, the presiding judge, Oh Duk-Shik, requested that the video be submitted as evidence to the court as the content in the video was disputed. After objections from Goo's lawyers over the possibility that the public might view the video in court, the judge viewed the video privately in his chamber to confirm the content of the video. Additionally, Goo testified to Oh in private for two hours as well.

In August 2019, Choi was sentenced to one year and six months in prison, suspended for three years after probation, after being convicted of threatening to upload the sex video, coercion, physical assault, and destroying Goo's property. He was acquitted of the charge of filming the sex video without permission, as the court determined Goo had filmed the video herself. After news of her sex video went public, Goo was harassed online on social media, despite being the victim of a crime.

Upon closure of an appeal of the suspended sentence on July 2, 2020, Choi was sentenced to a year in prison, with the court stating that Choi "was well aware that the degree of damage would be very serious if the sex videos were leaked, given that the victim was a famous celebrity". The prosecution team appealed to the Supreme Court for a heavier sentence on July 8, 2020.

On September 23, Choi applied for bail while awaiting for the decision from the Supreme Court regarding the prosecution's appeal that was set for October 15. The Supreme Court denied his bail stating, "There is no significant reason to grant bail for Choi Jong-Bum. This decision was made with the consensus of the Supreme Court Justices involved." The Supreme Court upheld the one-year sentence on October 15, 2020.

On October 13, 2020, Choi filed a civil lawsuit against six netizens who made negative comments about him while requesting police to investigate possible cases of defamation of himself. On March 16, 2021, a district court judge dismissed five of the six claims while ordering the remaining defendant to pay ₩300,000 (2021) (equivalent to ₩341,288.48 or US$254.64 in 2025). The judge found that five comments were of criticisms of the crimes committed despite the crude language used, while the sixth was a direct personal attack on Choi. A separate defamation lawsuit was dismissed on appeal in September 2024.

=== Social pressure and harassment ===
During her idol career, Goo was subject to an increasing barrage of hate comments from part of the Korean public, aimed at making her conform to a strict moral code and devaluing her public image. Her detractors used the comment box of Goo's social media page to criticize her "terrifying personality" and went on to define Goo as "low quality". These forms of harassment were not reserved only for Goo. K-pop idols in general have to show a spotless public image, devoid of scandals, especially in sexual matters which are still taboo in South Korea. Among other things, Goo was also accused of resorting to plastic surgery, a common practice in K-pop, that she later openly confirmed.

The multi-faceted hate comments are a product of the expectation of women's purity and chastity that pervade South Korean society. Goo received relentless hate comments about her sex video after the fight with her ex-boyfriend became public. Soon after, the agency which managed Goo's solo career decided to not renew her contract. Both Goo and her close friend Sulli, who also died by suicide, had their personal life under intense public scrutiny, working in an industry where idols are not usually allowed to date.

Korean singer and presenter Kim Hee-chul, a close friend of Goo and Sulli, explained during a TV show how hate comments are written by both men and women, and how, after the deaths of Sulli and Goo, commenters proceeded to blame the opposite gender for the suicides.

== Death ==
On November 24, 2019, Hara was found dead at her home in Cheongdam-dong, Gangnam, Seoul, with the cause of death ruled as a possible suicide. Police found a suicide note written by Goo, and concluded that there was no foul play, as she was seen on CCTV footage returning home at 12:40 a.m., with no further visitors except for the housekeeper who found her body at 6 p.m. the same day. An autopsy was not performed after the police consulted the prosecutor in-charge and took into consideration her family's request. The body was handed over to her family on November 26. Goo's death occurred little over a month after her close friend Sulli had also died of suicide.

Goo's funeral was privately held at Gangnam Severance Hospital by family members and friends, while a separate memorial service for fans took place on November 25 to 26 in The Catholic University of Korea Seoul St. Mary's Hospital in Gangnam. On November 27, Goo's body was cremated and her remains were enshrined at the Skycastle Memorial Park in Bundang, Gyeonggi Province.

In April 2020, it was realized that a safe containing documents and old mobile phones had been stolen from Goo's vacated house. A police report was filed in May 2020. In 2024, Goo Hara's elder brother, Goo Ho-in revealed in a television interview details of the theft, stating that an unidentified man had broken into her house on January 14, 2020. An AI-generated composite of the unidentified man was shown during the interview as well. The case remains opened to date. The AI-generated composite caused netizens potentially misidentifying a celebrity as the culprit.

On October 12, 2022, a South Korean court found that the actions by Choi Jong-Bum was the cause of the mental anguish that Goo faced to the point that she was driven to take her life in a 2020 civil lawsuit filed by her family and ordered him to pay ₩78 million (2022) (equivalent to ₩84.44 million or US$63,000.12 in 2025) in compensation to the family.

=== Posthumous releases, productions, and commemoration ===
On January 12, 2020, the music video for "Hello", a B-side track from "Midnight Queen", was released posthumously. Its lyrics were penned by Goo to thank her supporters, and the video featured her against the night-time cityscape of Tokyo, which she had loved. As a follow-up to the music video, a photobook, memorializing Goo with photos taken just before her death, was released posthumously on April 6, 2020.

In Kara's comeback and 15th anniversary album release, Move Again, in 2022, Goo was commemorated in the music video for one of its song, "When I Move" with a sixth table setting in a scene and six microphone stands on stage in another.

On July 16, 2024, Kara released the Korean version of "Hello" with Goo's parts mixed into the song. The song was initially to be released with Kara's fourth album "Full Bloom" in 2013, but was ultimately excluded. It was then Goo had her parts recorded. The 2024 version was rearranged and remastered to fit all six members of the group, including Hur Young-ji, who joined Kara in 2014.

== Legacy ==
Goo's death brought worldwide attention to sexual crimes against women in South Korea. Following her death, a petition was submitted to the Blue House with over 200,000 signatures demanding more severe punishment for filming sexual acts without consent and distributing the videos, revenge porn, and more generally to improve the definition of sexual assault. Another petition targeted online bullying and hate comments. Moreover, in 2024, it was revealed how Goo had a pivotal role in the investigation that reporter Kang Kyung-yoon was conducting of the KakaoTalk chatrooms, in which rape videos were being shared. Goo was aware that her friend Choi Jong-hoon could be part of the rape scandal and convinced him over the phone to reveal the identity of Yoon Gyu-geun, the Seoul Metropolitan Police Agency officer who chatroom members referred to as the "police chief" that "watched their backs".

=== Petition to revise inheritance law and the Goo Hara Act ===
Goo Hara's elder brother, Goo Ho-in, after being contacted by their estranged mother for a share of Goo Hara's inheritance, started a petition to revise South Korea's inheritance law to prevent a parent from claiming inheritance if they had neglected their parental duties. The petition was successful, gathering 100,000 signatures in 30 days. Goo Ho-in then pushed the legislature to introduce the law in Goo Hara's name, as the Goo Hara Act. The bill failed to pass in the 20th National Assembly amid claims that it needed further review. The 21st National Assembly continued to look into the prospective law.

At the plenary session held on December 1, 2020, a revised law was passed by the 21st National Assembly, along with other unrelated bills. The revised law (Korean: 공무원 구하라법; lit. 'Civil Servant Goo Hara Law'), which was approved by the cabinet, introduced amendments to the Public Officials' Accident Compensation Act and Public Officials Pension Act, to prevent relatives of public servants from claiming inheritances on their pensions if they were not involved in their upbringing.

The general Goo Hara Act remained languished at the national assembly until the Constitutional Court of Korea ruled that the relevant provisions in the Civil Code that set the mandatory share of inheritance between siblings and parents upon a one's death were unconstitutional on April 25, 2024, and would automatically lose effect by December 31 if no further amendments were to be introduced. The Court made the decision after there were 47 constitution petitions filed since 2020 to review the provisions. On August 28, the Goo Hara Act was finally passed into law, amending the Civil Code accordingly to prevent a parent from inheriting their child's estate if they had neglected in their parental duties, with the amendments taking effect from January 1, 2026, while also retroactively be applicable to inheritance claims made since April 25, 2024.

On December 5, 2025, a further amendment to the National Pension Act was announced, which introduced similar provisions on such inheritance of public pensions and it took effect from January 1, 2026.

=== Inheritance lawsuit ===
Under the Civil Code (prior to the 2026 revision), Goo Hara's estate was to be inherited equally by her parents. As her mother reportedly abandoned the family when Goo Hara was nine and thus did not fulfill her parental duties to the siblings, Goo Ho-in filed a lawsuit to prevent their mother from inheriting a share of the estate, while she retained legal counsel to secure her inheritance rights. The revised inheritance law could not be used to deny their mother's claim, as South Korean law does not permit the retrospective application of new or amended laws to cases that arose before their enactment. Their father relinquished his inheritance claim in favor of Ho-in as he felt that he did not do much for Hara. On December 22, 2020, the Gwangju Family Court ruled that their mother would receive 40% of the estate, while Goo Ho-in would receive the remaining 60%.

=== Fundraiser for single parent families ===
On the second anniversary of Goo Hara's death in 2021, Goo Ho-in announced that he would auction 10 oil paintings done by Goo Hara of which proceeds would partially be donated to a Japanese non-profit organization, Florence, whose primary clients are single parent families.

== Discography ==
=== Extended plays ===
Title	Details	Peak chart positions				Sales
Title	Details	KOR	JPN	TWN	US World	Sales
Alohara (Can You Feel It?)	Released: July 14, 2015; Label: DSP Media; Format: CD, digital download	4	64	34	94	KOR: 6,280
"—" denotes releases that did not chart or were not released in that region.

=== Singles ===
Title	Year	Peak positions			Sales	Album
Title	Year	KOR	KOR Hot 100	JPN	Sales	Album
"Secret Love" (시크릿 러브)	2012	68	74	—	KOR: 54,419	Kara Solo Collection
"Magic of Love" (사랑의 마법)	2013	—	—	—	—N/a	Galileo+
"Choco Chip Cookies" (초코칩쿠키) (featuring Giriboy)	2015	21	85	—	KOR: 37,204	Alohara (Can You Feel It?)
"How About Me?" (어때) (featuring YoungJi)	2015	—	—	—	KOR: 4,804	Alohara (Can You Feel It?)
"Wild"	2018	—	—	—	—N/a	Non-album single
"Midnight Queen"	2019	—	—	29	JPN: 5,477	Non-album single
"—" denotes releases that did not chart or were not released in that region.

=== Other appearances ===
Year	Song	Other artists	Album	Ref.
2011	"I Love You, I Want You, I Need You (Sweet Acoustic Ver.)"		City Hunter OST Special	
2014	"Talk About Love"	Various artists	Non-album single	
2017	"Sign"	Thunder featuring Goo Hara	Thunder	
2018	"Shining Day"		Jugglers OST	

== Filmography ==
=== Film ===
Year	Title	Role	Notes	Ref.
2013	Kara The Animation	Herself	Animation; Japanese dubbed version	
2017	Sound of a Footstep	Yoon-jae	Web film	

=== Television series ===
Year	Title	Role	Ref.
2008	That Person is Coming	Gang of school girls (Cameo)	
2009	Hero	Cameo (as part of Kara)	
2011	Urakara	Hara	
2011	City Hunter	Choi Da-hye	
2013	Galileo 2	Cameo	
2014	Secret Love	Lee Hyun-jung	
2014	It's Okay, That's Love	Cameo (Ep.16)	

=== Television shows ===
Year	Title	Role	Ref.
2008–2009	Check it Girl - Strange Casting – Season 2	Cast member	
2009	Hunters	Cast member	
2009–2010	Invincible Youth	Cast member	
2014	ON & OFF: The Gossip		
2015	A Style For You	Host	
2015	Shaolin Clenched Fists	Cast member	
2017	Seoul Mate	Cast member	
2018	My Mad Beauty Diary	Host	

=== Events hosting ===
Year	Title	Role	Ref.
2011	Dream Concert	Host with Kim Heechul and Song Joong-ki	
2011	Seoul-Tokyo Music Festival	Host with Park Gyu-ri	
2012	Inkigayo	Host with Jung Nicole and IU	
2012	Korean Music Wave in Kobe	Host with Han Seungyeon and Hongki	
2013	Dream Concert	Host with Onew and Doojoon	
2013	KBS Entertainment Awards	Host	
2014	Hallyu Dream Festival	Host with Seo Kang-joon and Dasom	
2015	Dream Concert	Host with Dasom and Eunjung	
2015	Show! Champion - Yokohama Special	Host with Heo Youngji	
2016	Power of K	Host with Leeteuk	

== Awards and nominations ==
Year	Award	Category	Nominated work	Result	Ref.
2010	KBS Entertainment Awards	Best Female MC Award	Invincible Youth	Won	
2011	5th Mnet 20's Choice Award	Hot Campus Girl	—N/a	Won	
2011	SBS Drama Awards	New Star Award	City Hunter	Won	
2013	'50th' Savings Day	Saving Award	—N/a	Won	
2015	2015 SBS Entertainment Awards	Best Challenge Award	Shaolin Clenched Fists	Won	

== See also ==
- Suicide in South Korea
- Jung Joon-young KakaoTalk chatrooms scandal
- Molka, taking visual images without consent.
