= Love & Hate (Hyolyn album) =

- Digital cover

Studio album by Hyolyn
- Released: November 26, 2013
- Recorded: 2013
- Genre: Dance-pop; R&B
- Language: Korean
- Label: Starship

Hyolyn chronology
Love & Hate (2013)	It's Me (2016)

Singles from Love & Hate
- 1. "Lonely" Released: November 25, 2013; 2. "One Way Love" Released: November 26, 2013

Love & Hate is the debut studio album of South Korean singer Hyolyn (leader of Sistar). The album was released on November 26, 2013 and reached number 5 on South Korea's Gaon Album Chart.

== Release and singles ==
On November 20, 2013, Hyolyn unveiled the track list for her debut solo album. As shown in the track list, the album consists of a total of 10 tracks by producers Brave Brothers, Duble Sidekick, Kim Do Hoon, and more. Hyolyn also collaborated with artists Mad Clown, Dok2, and Block B's Zico. Hyolyn released two lead singles, "Lonely" and "One Way Love". Love and Hate consists of tracks produced by some of K-pop's hit producers, including Brave Brothers, Kim Do Hoon and Brave Brothers The album was released on November 26, 2013, and reached a position of number 5 on the Gaon Weekly Albums Chart.

Hyolyn uses a whispery voice for this song and explores the streets of London in the music video. Its music video and digital single were released on November 25, 2013. The song reached number 3 on the Gaon Digital Singles Chart.

The lead single "One Way Love", produced by Brave Brothers, is a "hip-hop style R&B" song with a "touch of tango beat". The second single, "Lonely", produced by Kim Da Hoon, is a British retro-pop song with piano and acoustic guitar. The album also features Korean rappers such as Mad Clown, Block B's Zico, Dok2 and Geek's Lil' Boy.On November 26, Hyolyn held a successful media showcase in celebration of the release of her solo album at Seoul Ilchi Art Hall. The video features actor Yoo Yeon-seok as the male lead. The track reached number 1 on the Gaon Digital Singles Chart.

Hyolyn held the album's showcase performance at the Ilchi Art Hall in Cheongdam-dong, Gangnam-Gu, Seoul on November 26, 2013. She performed songs from her solo debut album and held a showcase on Mnet, performing Sistar's songs with the members as well as her own tracks from her album. Only top stars such as BoA, Lee Hyori and Rain have been given this honor by Mnet.

== Track listing ==
No.	Title	Lyrics	Music	Length
1.	"Lonely"	Min Yeonjae	Kim Dohoon	3:21
2.	"One Way Love" (너 밖에 몰라)	Brave Brothers	Brave Brothers, Elephant Kingdom	3:17
3.	"Don't Love Me" (사랑 하지 마)	Duble Sidekick, SEION	Duble Sidekick, SEION	3:39
4.	"Stalker" (featuring Mad Clown)	Mad Clown, Kim Dohoon	Kim Dohoon	4:01
5.	"Massage" (마사지; featuring Dok2)	Jeon Goon, Ye-Yo	Jeon Goon, Ye-Yo	3:14
6.	"Closer"	Min Yeonjae	Megatone, The Name	3:59
7.	"Red Lipstick" (립스틱 짙게 바르고; featuring Zico of Block B)	Duble Sidekick	Duble Sidekick	3:17
8.	"Falling"	Duble Sidekick	Duble Sidekick, 텐조와타스코	3:36
9.	"O.M.G" (featuring Lil Boi of Geeks)	Crush, Lil Boi	Primary, Crush	3:13
10.	"Tonight" (오늘 밤)	Min Yeonjae, Kim Dohoon, Seo Youngbae	Kim Dohoon, Seo Youngbae	3:38

== Chart performance ==
Chart	Peak position
Gaon Weekly album chart	5
Gaon Monthly album chart	18
Gaon Yearly album chart	—

=== Sales and certifications ===
Chart	Amount
Gaon physical sales	6,300+
