= Hong-gi =

- Hangul: 홍기
- RR: Honggi
- MR: Honggi

Hong-gi, also spelled Hong-ki, Hongkee is a Korean given name.

People with this name include:

- Han Hong-ki (1924–1996), South Korean football player
- Na Hoon-a (born Choi Hong-ki, 1947), South Korean trot singer
- Shin Hong-gi (born 1968), South Korean football player
- Lee Hong-gi (born 1990), South Korean singer
- Justin H. Min (born Justin Hong-Kee Min, 1990), American actor

Fictional characters with this name include:

- Hong-ki, in 1999 South Korean film City of the Rising Sun

== See also ==
- List of Korean given names
