= Sistar19 =

South Korean girl group

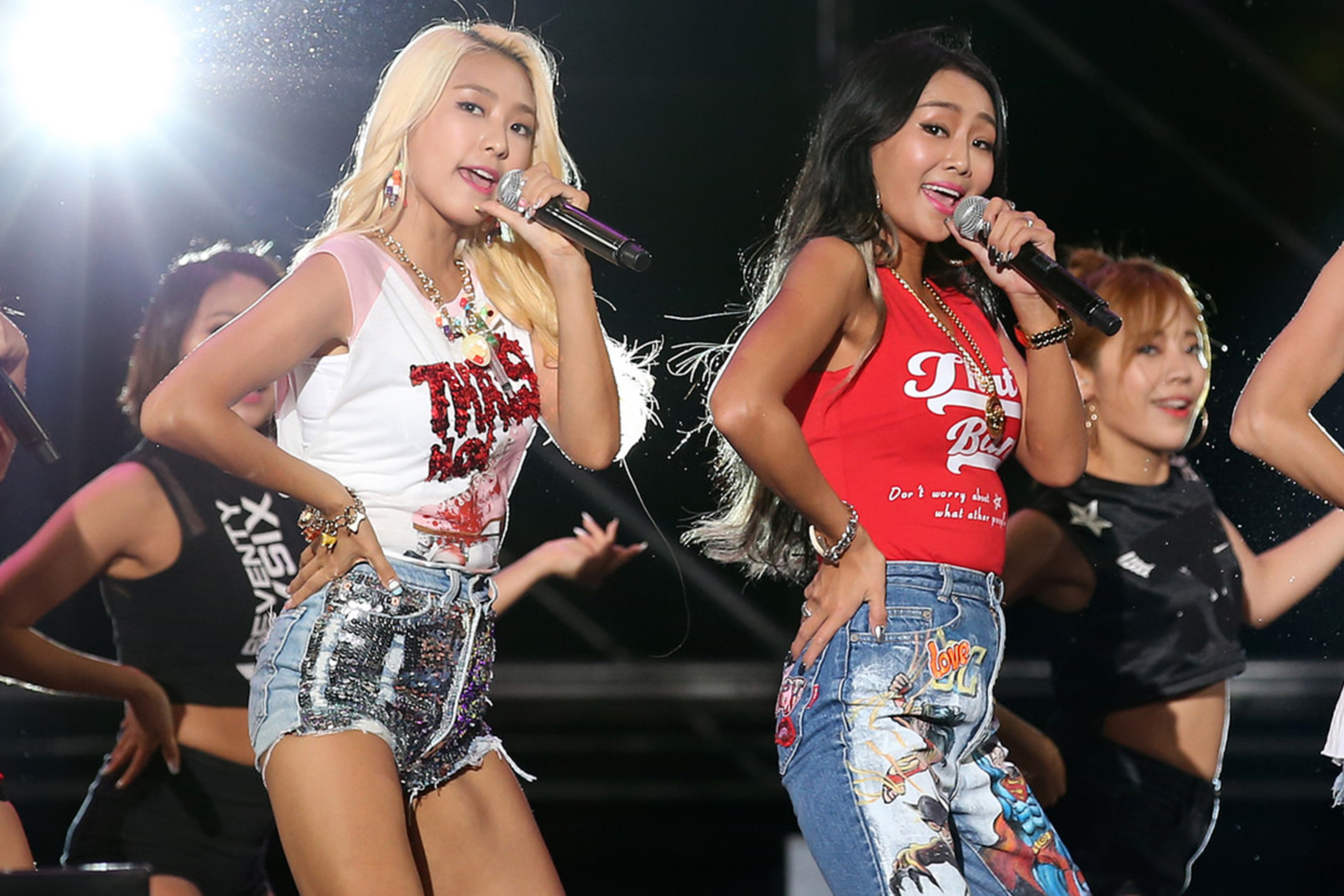
- Sistar19 in 2015; Left to right: Bora and Hyolyn

Background information
- Origin: Seoul, South Korea
- Genre: K-pop
- Years active: 2011–2013; 2024
- Labels: Starship; Klap
- Spinoff of: Sistar
- Members: Bora; Hyolyn

Sistar19 (Korean: 씨스타19) is a South Korean duo and sub-unit of the girl group Sistar, formed by Starship Entertainment. Composing of Bora and Hyolyn, they debuted in May 2011 with the digital single "Ma Boy". Their second and most successful single, "Gone Not Around Any Longer", was released in 2013 as the title track for their first and only EP of the same name.

Sistar, along with Sistar19, disbanded in June 2017. In January 2024, Sistar19 reunited to release their second digital single "No More (Ma Boy)".

== Name ==
On an episode of the MBC entertainment program Three Wheels, aired on May 21st 2013, Hyolyn and Bora explained that "19 represents nineteen, expressing the emotions of the boundary between girlhood and womanhood at the age of 19."

== History ==
=== 2011–2013: "Ma Boy" and Gone Not Around Any Longer ===
Sistar19 is a two-member sub-unit of Sistar under Starship Entertainment. Sistar19 was formed in 2011, with Sistar's main vocalist Hyolyn and rapper Bora. They held their debut performance as Sistar19 on May 5, 2011, on M Countdown with the single "Ma Boy", released that month. Their first mini album entitled Gone Not Around Any Longer was released on January 31, 2013. The lead single of the same name ascended to the top of the Billboard Korea K-Pop Hot 100 chart. In 2013, Sistar19 was nominated in the 2013 World Music Awards.

=== 2023–present: Return and "No More (Ma Boy)" ===
On November 16, 2023, it was announced that the duo would officially be coming back in January 2024. Later that month, the duo is reportedly scheduled to appear as a guest on the recording of JTBC's entertainment program Knowing Bros, with the episode scheduled to air in January 2024.

In December, the group unveiled their new official logo, designed in black and white with the Sistar19 group name in it. In an interview with fashion magazine Arena Homme +, Bora mentioned that making the decision to be a part of the duo has brought her a sense of stability. Afterwards, Hyolyn sincerely stated that both of them want to convey the image and message that they have drawn and refined based on their genuine feelings and thoughts to those who have been patiently waiting for the past 11 years.

In January, Sistar19 confirmed their comeback with a teaser image released on the 3rd. The teaser features a real-life silhouette of the duo against a red background, accompanied by the title "No More (Ma Boy)" written at the top. Their comeback single "No More (Ma Boy)" was released on January 16, 2024.

In March 2024, Sistar19, through The Recording Academy's digital performance series "Global Spin," delivered a charismatic performance of their new single "No More (Ma Boy)" as a celebration for their return to music after over a decade.

== Members ==
Adapted from the group's profile on Naver's official website.

- Hyolyn (효린) – leader, main vocal
- Bora (보라) – rapper

== Discography ==
=== Extended plays ===
Title	Details	Peak chart positions	Sales
Title	Details	KOR	Sales
Gone Not Around Any Longer	Released: January 31, 2013; Label: Starship Entertainment; Formats: CD, digital download	2	KOR: 13,964

=== Singles ===
Title	Year	Peak chart positions			Sales	Album
Title	Year	KOR	KOR Billb.	US World	Sales	Album
"Ma Boy"	2011	2	76	—	KOR: 2,652,474	Gone Not Around Any Longer
"Gone Not Around Any Longer"	2013	1	1	5	KOR: 1,723,704	Gone Not Around Any Longer
"No More (Ma Boy)"	2024	100	*	—	—N/a	Non-album single
"*" denotes that chart is now defunct.

=== Other charted songs ===
Title	Year	Peak chart positions		Sales	Album
Title	Year	KOR	KOR Hot	Sales	Album
"A Girl in Love"	2013	16	12	KOR: 470,585	Gone Not Around Any Longer
"Sistar19"	2013	— (Note: "Sistar19" did not enter the Gaon Digital Chart, but peaked at number 64 on the Gaon Download Chart.)	59	KOR: 26,500	Gone Not Around Any Longer
"Saucy" (Note: Released as a B-side for Sistar19's digital single "No More (Ma Boy)")	2024	— (Note: "Saucy" did not enter on the Circle Digital Chart but appeared at number 48 on the component Circle Download Chart.)	*	—N/a	Non-album song
"—" denotes releases that did not enter digital chart but entered download chart. "*" denotes that chart is now defunct.

== Videography ==
=== Music videos ===
List of music videos, showing year released and director
Title	Year	Director(s)	Ref.
"Ma Boy"	2011	Joo Hee-sun	
"Gone Not Around Any Longer"	2013	Joo Hee-sun	
"No More (Ma Boy)"	2024	TBA	

== Awards ==
Award ceremony	Year	Category	Nominee(s)	Result	Ref.
Circle Chart Music Awards	2013	Song of the Year - February	"Gone Not Around Any Longer"	Won	
