= Gone Not Around Any Longer =

EP by Sistar19
- Released: January 31, 2013
- Recorded: 2012
- Genre: Pop
- Length: 14:27
- Language: Korean
- Label: Starship Entertainment
- Producer: Brave Brothers; Elephant Kingdom

Singles from Gone Not Around Any Longer
- 1. "Ma Boy" Released: May 3, 2011; 2. "Gone Not Around Any Longer" Released: January 28, 2013

Gone Not Around Any Longer (Korean: 있다 없으니까; RR: Itda Eopseunikka) is the first extended play released by South Korean girl group Sistar's sub-unit Sistar19. It was released as a CD and online as a single on January 31, 2013, through Starship Entertainment.

The song was a commercial success, peaking at number 1 on the Gaon Digital Chart. The song has been streamed over 37,190,626 times and has sold over 1,723,704 downloads as of 2013.

== Release ==
On January 24, 2013, Sistar19 has released teaser photos for their comeback and revealed that their new song will be releasing on January 31. Sistar19 was featured in a "bed pictorial" concept wearing knitwear while posing on a bed.

On January 28, 2013, Sistar19 released the teaser for their upcoming song "Gone Not Around Any Longer"! On January 31, 2013, the full Single and music video for "Gone Not Around Any Longer" were released simultaneously; the music video features actor Ahn Jae-hyun. The single was an immediate commercial success, gaining two "perfect all-kills" by hitting number one on all major Korean music charts and maintaining the position for two weeks. In addition, the song gained them their first number one on the Billboard "Korea K-Pop Hot 100" chart.

On February 7, 2013, Sistar19 released the rehearsal video for the track.

== Promotion ==
Sistar19 had their comeback stage on M Countdown on January 31, 2013. The group also performed "Gone Not Around Any Longer" on various music shows such as Music Bank, Show! Music Core and Inkigayo in February. The song "Sistar19" was used for the comeback week special performances. The song gave the group their first TV music show award on M Countdown on February 7.

Music program awards
| Program | Date |
|---|---|
| M Countdown | February 7, 2013 |
| M Countdown | February 14, 2013 |
| M Countdown | February 21, 2013 |
| Music Triangle | February 13, 2013 |
| Music Triangle | February 20, 2013 |
| Music Triangle | February 27, 2013 |
| Music Triangle | March 6, 2013 |
| Music Bank | February 15, 2013 |
| Music Bank | February 22, 2013 |
| Music Bank | March 1, 2013 |
| Show Champion | February 20, 2013 |

== Track listing ==
Gone Not Around Any Longer
| No. | Title | Lyrics | Music | Arrangements | Length |
|---|---|---|---|---|---|
| 1. | "SISTAR19" | Brave Brothers | Brave Brothers | Brave Brothers | 0:46 |
| 2. | "Gone Not Around Any Longer" (있다 없으니까) | Brave Brothers | Brave Brothers, Elephant Kingdom | Brave Brothers, Elephant Kingdom | 3:37 |
| 3. | "A Girl in Love" (나도 여자인데) | Brave Brothers, Chakun | Brave Brothers | Brave Brothers | 3:08 |
| 4. | "Ma Boy" | Brave Brothers, War of the Stars | Brave Brothers | Brave Brothers | 3:19 |
| 5. | "Gone Not Around Any Longer (있다 없으니까)" (Instrumental) | | Brave Brothers, Elephant Kingdom | Brave Brothers, Elephant Kingdom | 3:37 |
| Total length: | | | | | 14:27 |

== Personnel ==
- Hyorin – vocals
- Bora – rap
- Brave Brothers – producing, songwriting, arranger, music

== Charts ==
=== Album ===
==== Weekly charts ====
| Chart (2013) | Peak position |
|---|---|
| South Korea (Gaon Album Chart) | 2 |

==== Monthly charts ====
| Chart (2013) | Position |
|---|---|
| South Korea (Gaon Album Chart) | 8 |

==== Year-end charts ====
| Chart (2013) | Position |
|---|---|
| South Korea (Gaon Album Chart) | 99 |

=== Single ===
"Gone Not Around Any Longer"

==== Weekly charts ====
| Chart (2013) | Peak position |
|---|---|
| South Korea (Gaon Digital Chart) | 1 |
| South Korea (K-pop Hot 100) | 1 |
| US World Digital Song Sales (Billboard) | 5 |

==== Monthly charts ====
| Chart (2013) | Position |
|---|---|
| South Korea (Gaon Digital Chart) | 1 |

==== Year-end charts ====
| Chart (2013) | Position |
|---|---|
| South Korea (Gaon Digital Chart) | 3 |
| South Korea (K-pop Hot 100) | 1 |

== Release history ==
| Country | Date | Format | Label |
|---|---|---|---|
| South Korea | January 31, 2013 | Digital download | Starship Entertainment; LOEN Entertainment |
| South Korea | February 6, 2013 | CD | Starship Entertainment; LOEN Entertainment |
