= List of songs recorded by Sistar =

Here is a list of songs by the Korean girl group Sistar.

== A ==
| Song | Writer | Album | Year |
|---|---|---|---|
| "Alone" | Brave Brothers | Alone | 2012 |
| "A Girl In Love" | Brave Brothers | Gone Not Around Any Longer | 2013 |
| "A Week" | Duble Sidekick, David Kim, Faces of Glory | Give It to Me | 2013 |

== B ==
| Song | Writer | Album | Year |
|---|---|---|---|
| "Bad Boy" | Rhymer, Gweet Club, Mass Turkey | Give It to Me | 2013 |
| "But I Love U" | Mad Clown, Min Yeon Jae | Touch & Move | 2014 |
| "Bad Guy" | The Name, Mad Clown | Shake It | 2015 |

== C ==
| Song | Writer | Album | Year |
|---|---|---|---|
| "Come Closer" | War of the Stars | Alone | 2012 |
| "Crying" | Hyolyn, Hyo Sung Jin | Give It to Me | 2013 |

== D ==
| Song | Writer | Album | Year |
|---|---|---|---|
| "Drop the Beat (feat. B2K)" | Brave Brothers | Shady Girl | 2010 |
| "Don't Be Such a Baby (feat. Giriboy)" | Duble Sidekick, David Kim, Giriboy, Bora | Shake It | 2015 |

== F ==
| Song | Writer | Album | Year |
|---|---|---|---|
| "Follow Me" | Rovin | So Cool | 2011 |
| "For You" | SISTAR | non-album single | 2017 |

== G ==
| Song | Writer | Album | Year |
|---|---|---|---|
| "Girls Do It" | Rovin | So Cool | 2011 |
| "Girls On Top" | Jo Seong Hwak, Rovin | Alone | 2012 |
| "Gone Not Around Any Longer" | Brave Brothers | Gone Not Around Any Longer | 2013 |
| "Give It to Me" | Duble Sidekick | Give It to Me | 2013 |
| "Good Time" | Lee Ji Eun | Shake It | 2015 |
| "Go Up" | Rovin, Bigtone | Shake It | 2015 |

== H ==
| Song | Writer | Album | Year |
|---|---|---|---|
| "Here We Come" | Brave Brothers | Push Push | 2010 |
| "How Dare You" | Brave Brothers | So Cool | 2010 |
| "Holiday" | Duble Sidekick | Loving U | 2012 |
| "Hot Place" | ft. Bravesound | | |
| "Hey You" | Duble Sidekick, David Kim | Give It to Me | 2013 |
| "Hold On Tight" | 귓방망이, Rhymer | Sweet & Sour | 2014 |

== I ==
| Song | Writer | Album | Year |
|---|---|---|---|
| "I Don't Want a Weak Man" | Minfee | So Cool | 2010 |
| "I Choose to Love You" | Kim Chang Ki, Jang Won Gyu | Alone | 2012 |
| "If U Want" | Rhymer, Assbrass, Choi Hwa Young | Give It to Me | 2013 |
| "I Swear" | Duble Sidekick | Sweet & Sour | 2014 |
| "I Like That" | Black Eyed Pilseung | Insane Love | 2016 |

== L ==
| Song | Writer | Album | Year |
|---|---|---|---|
| "Let's Get The Party Started" | Maboos | So Cool | 2011 |
| "Lead Me" | Duble Sidekick, Ice Mike | Alone | 2012 |
| "Loving U" | Duble Sidekick | Loving U | 2012 |
| "Lonely" | Blacked Eye Pilseung, Jeongun | non-album single | 2017 |

== M ==
| Song | Writer | Album | Year |
|---|---|---|---|
| "Mighty Sistar" | Brave Brothers | How Dare You | 2010 |
| "Ma Boy" | Brave Brothers | So Cool | 2011 |
| "Miss Sistar (feat. Duble Sidekick, Jooheon)" | Duble Sidekick | Give It to Me | 2013 |

== N ==
| Song | Writer | Album | Year |
|---|---|---|---|
| "New World" | Rovin | So Cool | 2011 |
| "No Mercy" | Rovin | Alone | 2012 |
| "Naughty Hands (feat. Verbal Jint)" | Duble Sidekick, David Kim, Verbal Jint | Touch N Move | 2014 |

== O ==
| Song | Writer | Album | Year |
|---|---|---|---|
| "Oh Baby" | Brave Brothers | So Cool | 2010 |
| "Over" | Brave Brothers | So Cool | 2010 |
| "Ok Go!" | Rovin | Touch N Move | 2014 |
| "One More Day" | Giorgio Moroder | non-album single | 2016 |

== P ==
| Song | Writer | Album | Year |
|---|---|---|---|
| "Push Push" | Brave Brothers | So Cool | 2010 |

== S ==
| Song | Writer | Album | Year |
|---|---|---|---|
| "Shady Girl" | Brave Brothers | So Cool | 2010 |
| "So Cool" | Brave Brothers | So Cool | 2011 |
| "Sistar19" | Brave Brothers | Gone Not Around Any Longer | 2013 |
| "Summer Time" | Rovin, Jo Sung Hwak | Give It to Me | 2013 |
| "Shake It" | Duble Sidekick, Hot-D | Shake It | 2015 |
| "String" | Robin, Min Yeonjae | Insane Love | 2016 |
| "Say I Love You" | Hyolyn | Insane Love | 2016 |

== T ==
| Song | Writer | Album | Year |
|---|---|---|---|
| "The Way You Make Me Melt" | Duble Sidekick | Give It to Me | 2013 |
| "Touch My Body" | Black Eyed Pilseung | Touch N Move | 2014 |

== U ==
| Song | Writer | Album | Year |
|---|---|---|---|
| "Up & Down" | Min Yeon Jae, Tarmo Keranen, Amy Pearson | Give It to Me | 2013 |
| "Under the Blanket" | Duble Sidekick, Long Candy | Insane Love | 2016 |

== W ==
| Song | Writer | Album | Year |
|---|---|---|---|
| "Wow" | Rado, Choi Kyu Sung | Touch & Move | 2014 |
| "Wanna Do It" | Park Suseok, Park Eun-ooh | Insane Love | 2016 |

== Y ==
| Song | Writer | Album | Year |
|---|---|---|---|
| "Yeah Yeah" | 9999, Esbee, HWA.B | Insane Love | 2016 |

== See also ==
- Sistar discography
- List of awards and nominations received by Sistar
