= Sistar discography =

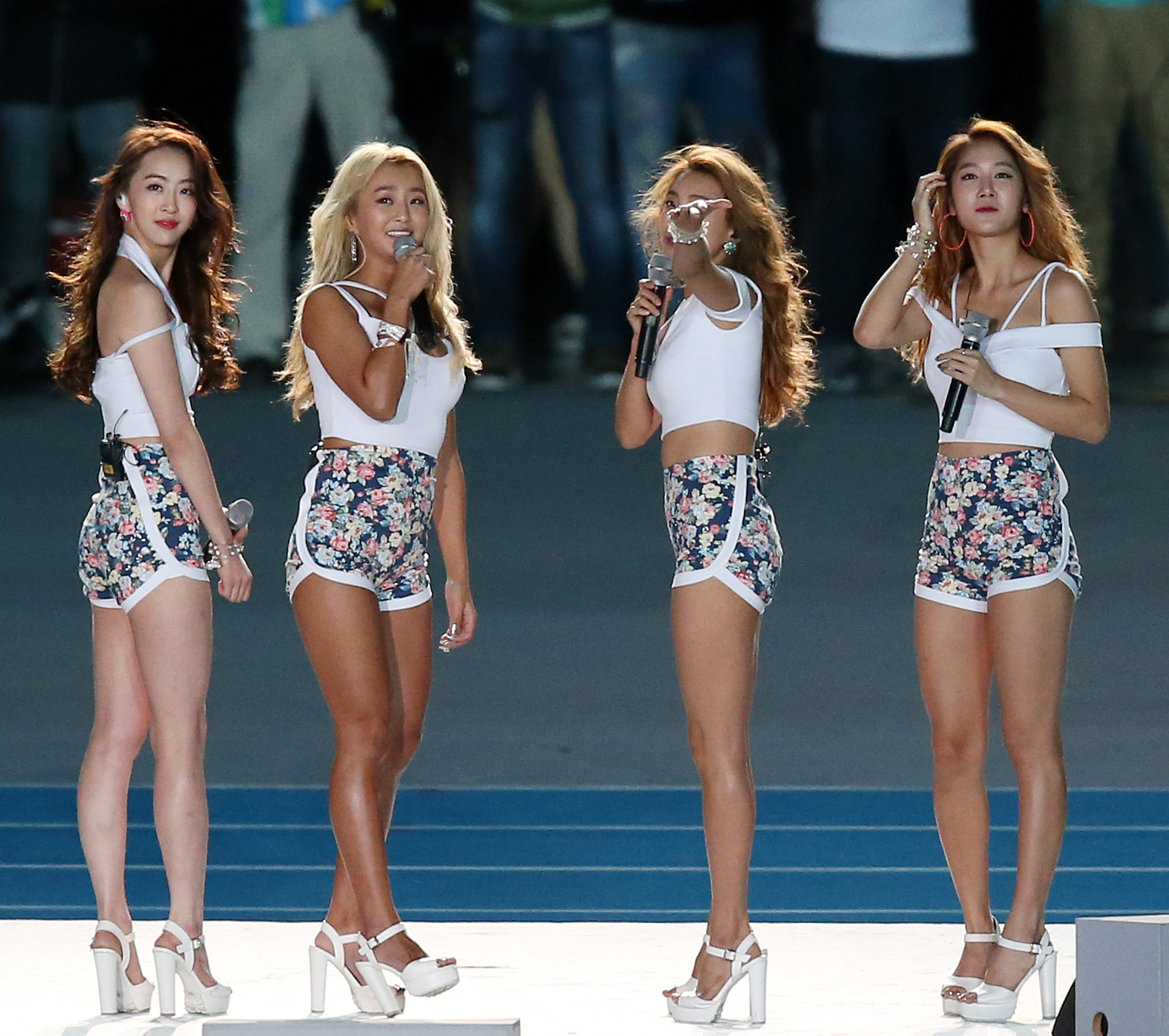
- Sistar at the 2014 Incheon Asian Games. From left to right: Kim Da-som, Hyolyn, Yoon Bo-ra, Soyou
- Studio albums: 2
- Extended plays: 4
- Soundtrack albums: 1
- Singles: 17
- Music videos: 14

The discography of the South Korean girl group Sistar consists of two studio albums, four extended plays, three single albums, two compilation album, seventeen singles and one soundtrack contribution. The group debuted with the song "Push Push" on June 3, 2010.

== Albums ==
=== Studio albums ===
Title	Album details	Peak chart positions			Sales
Title	Album details	KOR	JPN	US World	Sales
So Cool	Released: August 9, 2011; Label: Starship Entertainment; Formats: CD, digital download	10	—	—	KOR: 25,777
Give It to Me	Released: June 11, 2013; Label: Starship Entertainment; Formats: CD, digital download	5	89	9	KOR: 22,365
"—" denotes releases that did not chart or were not released in that region.

=== Compilation albums ===
List of compilation albums, with selected details, chart positions, and sales
Title	Details	Peak chart positions		Sales
Title	Details	KOR	JPN	Sales
Loving U	Released: June 28, 2012; Label: Starship Entertainment; Formats: CD, digital download	11	254	KOR: 20,020
Sweet & Sour	Released: August 26, 2014; Label: Starship Entertainment; Formats: CD, digital download	4	186	KOR: 7,006

=== Single albums ===
List of single albums, with selected details, chart positions, and sales
Title	Details	Peak chart positions
Title	Details	KOR
Push Push	Released: June 3, 2010; Label: Starship Entertainment; Formats: CD, digital download	63
Shady Girl	Released: August 25, 2010; Label: Starship Entertainment; Formats: CD, digital download	9
How Dare You	Released: December 3, 2010; Label: Starship Entertainment; Formats: CD, digital download	8

== Extended plays ==
List of extended plays, with selected details, chart positions, sales, and certifications
Title	Details	Peak chart positions		Sales
Title	Details	KOR	US World	Sales
Alone	Released: April 12, 2012; Label: Starship Entertainment; Formats: CD, digital download	3	—	KOR: 17,802
Touch N Move	Released: July 21, 2014; Label: Starship Entertainment; Formats: CD, digital download	2	8	KOR: 14,548
Shake It	Released: June 22, 2015; Label: Starship Entertainment; Formats: CD, digital download	3	6	KOR: 19,396
Insane Love	Released: June 21, 2016; Label: Starship Entertainment; Formats: CD, digital download	3	7	KOR: 10,707
"—" denotes releases that did not chart or were not released in that region.

== Singles ==
=== As lead artist ===
Title	Year	Peak chart positions			Sales	Album
Title	Year	KOR	KOR Hot	US World	Sales	Album
"Push Push"	2010	9	*	—	KOR: 1,779,327	So Cool
"Shady Girl" (가식걸)	2010	4	*	—	KOR: 1,623,243	So Cool
"How Dare You" (니까짓게)	2010	2	*	—	KOR: 847,105	So Cool
"So Cool"	2011	1	1	—	KOR: 3,980,185	So Cool
"Alone" (나혼자)	2012	1	1	7	KOR: 3,394,538	Alone
"Loving U" (러빙유)	2012	1	1	16	KOR: 3,420,332	Loving U
"Give It to Me"	2013	1	1	6	KOR: 1,622,854	Give It to Me
"Touch My Body"	2014	1	*	3	KOR: 1,529,792	Touch N Move
"I Swear"	2014	1	*	6	KOR: 825,818	Sweet And Sour
"Shake It"	2015	1	*	6	KOR: 1,550,251	Shake It
"I Like That"	2016	1	*	5	KOR: 884,858	Insane Love
"Lonely" (Note: "Lonely" was released as last digital single with B-side track, "For You".)	2017	1	*	8	KOR: 608,781	Non-album single
"—" denotes releases that did not chart or were not released in that region. "*" Billboard Korea K-Pop Hot 100 was introduced in August 2011 and discontinued in July 2014.

=== As featured artist ===
Title	Year	Peak chart positions	Sales (DL)	Album
Title	Year	KOR	Sales (DL)	Album
"Amazed" (기가 차) (K.Will feat. Supreme Team, Sistar (Note: Credited as Sistar but only features member Hyolyn.)	2011	2	KOR: 1,041,693	My Heart Beating

== Collaborations ==
Title	Year	Peak chart positions		Sales (DL)	Album
Title	Year	KOR	KOR Hot	Sales (DL)	Album
"We Never Go Alone"	2010	186	*	—N/a	Non-album singles
"Hot Place" (featuring Brave Sound)	2011	10	38	KOR: 1,045,376	Non-album singles
"Pink Romance" (with K.Will and Boyfriend)	2011	25	19	KOR: 979,392	Non-album singles
"Snow Candy" (with K.Will and Boyfriend)	2013	13	15	KOR: 220,673	Non-album singles
"Love Is You" (with K.Will, Boyfriend, Mad Clown, Junggigo and Jooyoung)	2014	14	*	KOR: 295,398	Non-album singles
"Softly (with Starship Planet)"	2015	24	*	KOR: 155,818	Starship Planet 2015 (single)
"One More Day" (with Giorgio Moroder)"	2016	75	*	KOR: 20,075	Non-album single
"—" denotes releases that did not chart or were not released in that region. "*" Billboard Korea K-Pop Hot 100 was introduced in August 2011 and discontinued in July 2014.

== Other charted songs ==
Title	Year	Peak chart positions		Sales (DL)	Album
Title	Year	KOR	US World	Sales (DL)	Album
"Girls Do It"	2011	26	—	KOR: 285,064	So Cool
"Follow Me"	2011	28	—	KOR: 160,191	So Cool
"New World"	2011	97	—	KOR: 81,251	So Cool
"I Don't Need A Weak Man"	2011	102	—	KOR: 70,330	So Cool
"Let's Get The Party Started"	2011	134	—	KOR: 30,894	So Cool
"Ma Boy (Special ver.)"	2011	136	—	KOR: 27,439	So Cool
"Oh Baby"	2011	148	—	KOR: 16,866	So Cool
"Over"	2011	164	—	KOR: 13,636	So Cool
"Lead Me"	2012	27	—	KOR: 475,616	Alone
"No Mercy"	2012	46	—	KOR: 245,849	Alone
"Girls on Top"	2012	85	—	KOR: 94,733	Alone
"Come Closer"	2012	96	—	KOR: 67,625	Alone
"I Choose To Love You"	2012	107	—	KOR: 41,430	Alone
"Holiday" (홀리데이)	2012	59	—	KOR: 150,790	Loving U
"The Way You Make Me Melt"	2013	2	—	KOR: 910,841	Give It to Me
"Bad Boy"	2013	4	—	KOR: 732,582	Give It to Me
"Crying"	2013	17	—	KOR: 490,749	Give It to Me
"A Week"	2013	39	—	KOR: 143,539	Give It to Me
"Summer Time"	2013	34	—	KOR: 174,049	Give It to Me
"If U Want"	2013	49	—	KOR: 98,665	Give It to Me
"Hey You"	2013	54	—	KOR: 114,881	Give It to Me
"Up and Down"	2013	64	—	KOR: 84,555	Give It to Me
"Miss Sistar"	2013	66	—	KOR: 72,612	Give It to Me
"Naughty Hands"	2014	7	—	KOR: 404,752	Touch N Move
"But I Love U"	2014	19	—	KOR: 167,256	Touch N Move
"Sunshine"	2014	39	—	KOR: 73,221	Touch N Move
"OK Go"	2014	45	—	KOR: 67,742	Touch N Move
"Wow"	2014	55	—	KOR: 45,032	Touch N Move
"Hold on Tight"	2014	70	—	KOR: 43,054	Sweet & Sour
"Don't Be Such A Baby" (애처럼 굴지마) (featuring Giriboy)	2015	10	—	KOR: 206,546	Shake It
"Bad Guy" (나쁜놈) (featuring Mad Clown)	2015	24	—	KOR: 115,686	Shake It
"Good Time"	2015	51	—	KOR: 51,884	Shake It
"Go Up"	2015	59	—	KOR: 44,771	Shake It
"String" (끈)	2016	42	—	KOR: 55,508	Insane Love
"Yeah Yeah"	2016	60	—	KOR: 44,947	Insane Love
"Say I Love You"	2016	65	—	KOR: 43,855	Insane Love
"Wanna Do It" (해볼래)	2016	90	—	KOR: 35,380	Insane Love
"Under the Blanket" (이불 덮고 들어)	2016	— (Note: "Under the Blanket" did not enter the Gaon Digital Chart, but peaked at number 52 on the Gaon Download Chart.)	—	KOR: 27,208	Insane Love
"For You"	2017	62	18	KOR: 36,240	Non-album single
"—" denotes releases that did not chart or were not released in that region.

== Other song appearances ==
Title	Year	Peak position	Album
Title	Year	KOR	Album
"Super Girl" (with Yuna Kim, Electroboyz)	2010	57	Non-album singles
"Win the Day" (with 4Minute, Miss A + 7 others)	2012	—	Non-album singles
"One K campaign song" (with EXO, Yangpa + 30 others)	2015	—	Non-album singles

== Soundtrack appearance ==
Year	Title	Peak position	Album
Year	Title	KOR	Album
2010	"Chronos Soul"	84	Chronos Sword OST

== Videography ==
=== Music videos ===
List of music videos, showing year released and director
Title	Year	Director(s)
"Push Push"	2010	Joo Hee-sun
"We Never Go Alone"	2010	Unknown
"Chronos Soul"	2010	Unknown
"Shady Girl"	2010	Joo Hee-sun
"How Dare You"	2010	Cho Soo-hyun
"So Cool"	2011	Joo Hee-sun
"Hot Place"	2011	Unknown
"Pink Romance"	2011	Chang Won-seok
"Alone"	2012	Joo Hee-sun
"Loving U"	2012	Joo Hee-sun
"Give It to Me"	2013	Joo Hee-sun
"Touch My Body"	2014	Joo Hee-sun
"I Swear"	2014	Lumpens
"Shake It"	2015	Joo Hee-sun
"I Like That"	2016	Lumpens
"One More Day"	2016	Hong Won-ki
"Lonely"	2017	Lumpens
