= List of awards and nominations received by Sistar =

Sistar awards and nominations
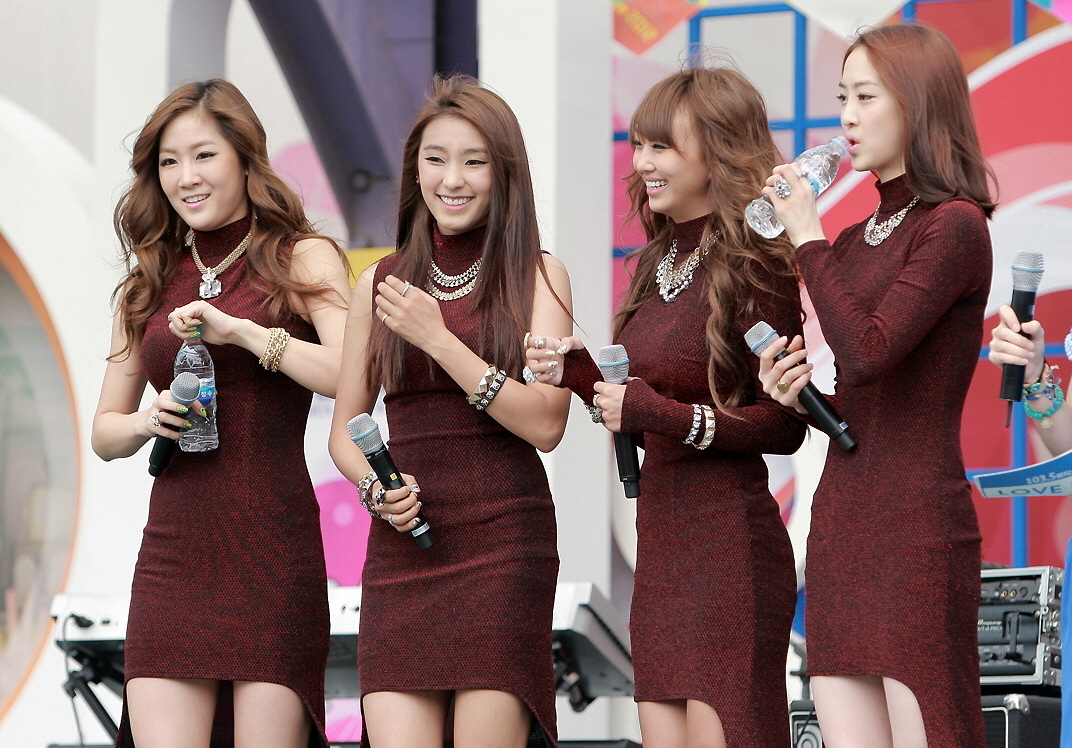
- Sistar in June 2012
Awards and nominations
Award	Wins	Nominations
Asia Model Awards	1	1
Cyworld Digital Music Awards	1	1
Gaon Chart Music Awards	3	4
Golden Disc Awards	9	11
Korean Best Dresser Award	1	1
Korean Culture Entertainment Awards	0	1
Korea Lifestyle Awards	1	1
Korea PD Awards	1	1
MBC Entertainment Awards	2	2
Melon Music Awards	5	10
Mnet 20's Choice Awards	2	4
Mnet Asian Music Awards	4	13
MTN Broadcast Advertisement Festival	1	1
Republic of Korea Entertainment Arts Awards	1	1
SBS Gayo Daejeon	1	1
SBS MTV Best of the Best	0	4
Seoul Music Awards	7	7
Seoul Success Awards	1	1
Style Icon Awards	2	2

Totals (Note: Certain award groups do not simply award one winner. They acknowledge several different recipients, have runners-up, and have third place. Since this is a specific recognition and is different from losing an award, runner-up mentions are considered wins in this award tally. For simplification and to avoid errors, each award in this list has been presumed to have had a prior nomination.)
- Wins: 43
- Nominations: 68

This is a list of awards and nominations received by Sistar, a South Korean girl group formed in 2010 by Starship Entertainment.

== Awards and nominations ==
Name of the award ceremony, year presented, category, nominee(s) of the award, and the result of the nomination
Award ceremony	Year	Category	Nominee / work	Result	Ref.
Asia Model Awards	2015	Asia Star Award (Singer)	Sistar	Won	
Cyworld Digital Music Awards	2010	Rookie of the Month	Sistar	Won	
Gaon Chart Music Awards	2013	Song of the Year - June	"Give It To Me"	Won	
Gaon Chart Music Awards	2014	Song of the Year - September	"I Swear"	Won	
Gaon Chart Music Awards	2016	Song of the Year - June	"I Like That"	Won	
Gaon Chart Music Awards	2018	Song of the Year - May	"Lonely"	Nominated	
Golden Disc Awards	2010	Yepp Newcomer Award	Sistar	Won	
Golden Disc Awards	2012	Digital Bonsang	"So Cool"	Won	
Golden Disc Awards	2012	Popularity Award	Sistar	Nominated	
Golden Disc Awards	2013	Digital Bonsang	"Alone"	Won	
Golden Disc Awards	2013	Samsung Galaxy Star Award	Sistar	Won	
Golden Disc Awards	2013	MSN Popularity Award	Sistar	Nominated	
Golden Disc Awards	2014	Digital Bonsang	"Give It To Me"	Won	
Golden Disc Awards	2014	CeCi Asia Icon Award	Sistar	Won	
Golden Disc Awards	2015	Digital Bonsang	"Touch My Body"	Won	
Golden Disc Awards	2016	Digital Bonsang	"Shake It"	Won	
Golden Disc Awards	2017	Best Female Performance Group	Sistar	Won	
Korean Best Dresser Award	2016	Best Dressed (Female Singer)	Sistar	Won	
Korean Culture Entertainment Awards	2012	Best Female Vocalist	Sistar	Nominated	
Korea Lifestyle Awards	2011	Best Style Icons	Sistar	Won	
Korea PD Awards	2013	Performer of the Year - Singer	Sistar	Won	
MBC Entertainment Awards	2012	Singer Choice Award	Sistar	Won	
MBC Entertainment Awards	2014	Singer Choice Award	Sistar	Won	
Melon Music Awards	2011	Top 10 (Bonsang)	Sistar	Won	
Melon Music Awards	2012	Artist of the Year	Sistar	Nominated	
Melon Music Awards	2012	Album of the Year	"Alone"	Nominated	
Melon Music Awards	2012	Song of the Year	"Alone"	Nominated	
Melon Music Awards	2012	Top 10 (Bonsang)	Sistar	Won	
Melon Music Awards	2012	Global Star Award	Sistar	Nominated	
Melon Music Awards	2013	Top 10 (Bonsang)	Sistar	Won	
Melon Music Awards	2014	Top 10 (Bonsang)	Sistar	Won	
Melon Music Awards	2015	Top 10 (Bonsang)	Sistar	Won	
Melon Music Awards	2017	Best R&B/Soul	"Lonely"	Nominated	
Mnet 20's Choice Awards	2012	20's Sexiest Performance	Sistar	Won	
Mnet 20's Choice Awards	2013	20's Online Music	Sistar	Won	
Mnet 20's Choice Awards	2013	20's Voice	Sistar	Nominated	
Mnet 20's Choice Awards	2013	20's Performance	Sistar	Nominated	
Mnet Asian Music Awards	2010	Best New Female Group	"Push Push"	Nominated	
Mnet Asian Music Awards	2012	Artist of the Year	Sistar	Nominated	
Mnet Asian Music Awards	2012	Song of the Year	"Alone"	Nominated	
Mnet Asian Music Awards	2012	Best Female Group	Sistar	Won	
Mnet Asian Music Awards	2012	Best Dance Performance – Female Group	"Alone"	Nominated	
Mnet Asian Music Awards	2013	Artist of the Year	Sistar	Longlisted	
Mnet Asian Music Awards	2013	Song of the Year	"Give It to Me"	Longlisted	
Mnet Asian Music Awards	2013	Best Female Group	Sistar	Nominated	
Mnet Asian Music Awards	2013	Best Dance Performance – Female Group	"Give It to Me"	Won	
Mnet Asian Music Awards	2013	Style in Music	Sistar	Won	
Mnet Asian Music Awards	2014	Artist of the Year	Sistar	Longlisted	
Mnet Asian Music Awards	2014	Song of the Year	"Touch My Body"	Nominated	
Mnet Asian Music Awards	2014	Best Female Group	Sistar	Won	
Mnet Asian Music Awards	2014	Best Dance Performance – Female Group	Touch My Body	Nominated	
Mnet Asian Music Awards	2015	Artist of the Year	Sistar	Longlisted	
Mnet Asian Music Awards	2015	Song of the Year	"Shake it"	Longlisted	
Mnet Asian Music Awards	2015	Best Female Group	Sistar	Nominated	
Mnet Asian Music Awards	2015	Best Dance Performance – Female Group	Shake it	Nominated	
Mnet Asian Music Awards	2016	Song of the Year	"I Like That"	Longlisted	
Mnet Asian Music Awards	2016	Best Dance Performance – Female Group	"I Like That"	Nominated	
MTN Broadcast Advertisement Festival	2013	Female CF Model Award	Sistar	Won	
Republic of Korea Entertainment Arts Awards	2010	Group Singers	Sistar	Won	
SBS Gayo Daejeon	2014	Top 10 Artists	Sistar	Won	
SBS MTV Best of the Best	2012	Best Rival (Live)	Sistar	Nominated	
SBS MTV Best of the Best	2014	Best Female Group	Sistar	Nominated	
SBS MTV Best of the Best	2014	Artist of the Year	Sistar	Nominated	
SBS MTV Best of the Best	2014	Best Female Video	"I Swear"	Nominated	
Seoul Music Awards	2011	Best Newcomer	Sistar	Won	
Seoul Music Awards	2012	Bonsang	"So Cool"	Won	
Seoul Music Awards	2013	Bonsang	"Loving U"	Won	
Seoul Music Awards	2013	Best Song Award	"Alone"	Won	
Seoul Music Awards	2014	Bonsang	"Give It To Me"	Won	
Seoul Music Awards	2015	Bonsang	"Touch My Body"	Won	
Seoul Music Awards	2016	Bonsang	"Shake It"	Won	
Seoul Success Awards	2010	Cultural Award	Sistar	Won	
Style Icon Awards	2012	Top 10 Style Icons	Sistar	Won	
Style Icon Awards	2013	Top 10 Style Icons	Sistar	Won	

== Other accolades ==
=== State and cultural honors ===
Name of country or organization, year given, and name of honor
Country or organization	Year	Honor	Ref.
39th Tourism Day	2012	Minister of Culture, Sports and Tourism Commendation	
South Korea (Note: Awarded at the Korean Popular Culture and Arts Awards, organized by the Korea Creative Content Agency and hosted by the South Korean Ministry of Culture, Sports and Tourism. Commendations are given to individuals or groups for their contribution to popular culture in South Korea and abroad.)	2013	Minister of Culture, Sports and Tourism Commendation	

=== Listicles ===
Name of publisher, year listed, name of listicle, and placement
Publisher	Year	Listicle	Ranking	Ref.
The Dong-a Ilbo	2016	Best Female Artists According to Experts	9th	
Forbes	2013	Korea Power Celebrity	26th	
Forbes	2015	Korea Power Celebrity	10th	
Forbes	2016	Korea Power Celebrity	28th	

In November 2012, Sistar was exclusively selected as "Woman of the Year" by men's magazine GQ Korea. In 2015, Sistar were ranked first in Forbes list of the best-selling Korean female groups.
