= Hyolyn discography =

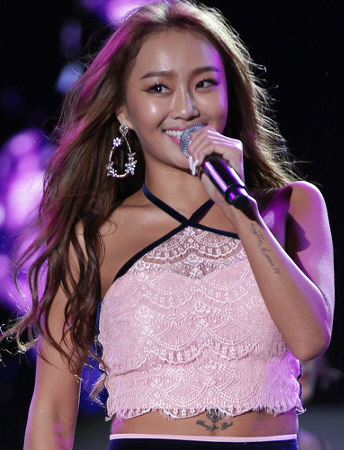
- Hyolyn in 2016
- Studio albums: 1
- EPs: 3
- Singles: 16
- Music videos: 16
- Soundtrack appearances: 12

South Korean singer Hyolyn has released one studio album, four extended plays, and nineteen singles. She was a member of the girl group Sistar until their disbandment in 2017. Since leaving Starship Entertainment, Hyolyn has established her own production company, bridʒ, and released a digital single titled "To Do List" on February 6, 2018.

== Albums ==
=== Studio albums ===
List of studio albums, with selected details and chart positions
| Title | Album details | Peak chart positions | | | Sales |
| Title | Album details | KOR | TWN | TWN East Asian | Sales |
|---|---|---|---|---|---|
| Love & Hate | Released: November 26, 2013; Label: Starship Entertainment; Format: CD, digital download | 5 | 11 | 18 | KOR: 9,703 |

== Extended plays ==
List of extended plays, with selected chart positions and sales
| Title | Details | Peak chart positions | Sales |
| Title | Details | KOR | Sales |
|---|---|---|---|
| It's Me | Released: November 8, 2016; Label: Starship Entertainment; Formats: CD, digital download | 15 | KOR: 3,478 |
| Say My Name | Released: August 19, 2020; Label: bridʒ Entertainment; Formats: CD, digital download | 19 | KOR: 3,189 |
| Ice | Released: July 18, 2022; Label: bridʒ Entertainment; Formats: CD, digital download | 36 | KOR: 3,629 |
| OriginaLyn | Released: July 22, 2026; Label: ReH Entertainment; Formats: LP, digital download | 99 | KOR: 763 |

== Singles ==
=== As lead artist ===
| Title | Year | Peak chart positions | | | Sales | Album |
| Title | Year | KOR | KOR Hot | US World | Sales | Album |
|---|---|---|---|---|---|---|
| "One Way Love" (너 밖에 몰라) | 2013 | 1 | 1 | 11 | KOR: 843,465 | Love & Hate |
| "Lonely" | 2013 | 4 | 3 | — | KOR: 347,364 | Love & Hate |
| "Love Like This" (feat. Dok2) | 2016 | 20 | — | — | KOR: 169,890 | It's Me |
| "One Step" (feat. Jay Park) | 2016 | 43 | — | — | KOR: 62,508 | It's Me |
| "Paradise" | 2016 | 54 | — | — | KOR: 32,590 | It's Me |
| "To Do List" (내일할래) | 2018 | 74 | — | — | —N/a | Non-album single |
| "Dally" (달리) (feat. Gray) | 2018 | 67 | 63 | 6 | —N/a | Say My Name |
| "See Sea" (바다보러갈래) | 2018 | 71 | 70 | 5 | US: 1,000 | Say My Name |
| "Bae" | 2018 | 99 | — | 22 | —N/a | Say My Name |
| "Youknowbetter" (니가 더 잘 알잖아) | 2019 | — (Note: "Youknowbetter" did not enter the Gaon Digital Chart, but peaked at number 144 on the Gaon Download Chart.) | — | 23 | —N/a | Non-album singles |
| "Hug Me Silently" (말 없이 안아줘) (feat. Crucial Star) | 2020 | — (Note: "Hug Me Silently" did not enter the Gaon Digital Chart, but peaked at number 59 on the Gaon BGM Chart.) | — | — | —N/a | Non-album singles |
| "9Lives" | 2020 | — | — | — | —N/a | Say My Name |
| "Say My Name" | 2020 | 128 | 96 | — | —N/a | Say My Name |
| "To Find a Reason" (없던 이유) (feat. Mad Clown & Kim Seungmin) | 2021 | — (Note: "To Find a Reason" did not enter the Gaon Digital Chart, but peaked at number 79 on the Gaon Download Chart.) | — | — | —N/a | Non-album singles |
| "A-Ha" (아하) | 2021 | — (Note: "A-Ha" did not enter the Gaon Digital Chart, but peaked at number 43 on the Gaon Download Chart.) | — | — | —N/a | Non-album singles |
| "Layin' Low" (feat. Jooyoung) | 2022 | — (Note: "Layin' Low" did not enter the Gaon Digital Chart, but peaked at number 38 on the Gaon Download Chart.) | — | — | —N/a | Ice |
| "No Thanks" | 2022 | — (Note: "No Thanks" did not enter the Gaon Digital Chart, but peaked at number 41 on the Circle Download Chart.) | * | — | —N/a | Ice |
| "This Love" (feat. Paul Blanco) | 2023 | — (Note: "This Love" did not enter the Circle Digital Chart, but peaked at number 49 on the Circle Download Chart.) | * | — | —N/a | Non-album singles |
| "Wait" | 2024 | — (Note: "Wait" did not enter the Circle Digital Chart, but peaked at number 17 on the Circle Download Chart.) | * | — | —N/a | Non-album singles |
| "You and I" | 2025 | — (Note: "You and I" did not enter the Circle Digital Chart, but peaked at number 66 on the Circle Download Chart.) | * | — | —N/a | OriginaLyn |
| "Shotty" | 2025 | — (Note: "Shotty" did not enter the Circle Digital Chart, but peaked at number 83 on the Circle Download Chart.) | * | — | —N/a | OriginaLyn |
| "Standing on the Edge" | 2025 | — (Note: "Standing on the Edge" did not enter the Circle Digital Chart, but peaked at number 60 on the Circle Download Chart.) | * | — | —N/a | OriginaLyn |
| "Check" | 2026 | — (Note: "Check" did not enter the Circle Digital Chart, but peaked at number 27 on the Circle Download Chart.) | * | — | —N/a | OriginaLyn |
"—" denotes releases that did not chart or were not released in that region. "*" denotes that chart is now defunct.

=== As featured artist ===
| Title | Year | Peak chart positions | | | Sales | Album |
| Title | Year | KOR | KOR Hot | US World | Sales | Album |
|---|---|---|---|---|---|---|
| "Ma Boy 2" (Electroboyz feat. Hyolyn) | 2011 | 30 | — | — | KOR: 2,023,031 | Rebirth |
| "Amazed" (K.Will feat. Hyolyn & Simon D) | 2011 | 2 | — | — | KOR: 1,041,693 | My Heart Is Beating |
| "Hot Wings" (날개뼈) (Dynamic Duo feat. Hyolyn) | 2013 | 11 | 10 | — | KOR: 706,411 | Lucky Numbers |
| "Without You" (Mad Clown feat. Hyolyn) | 2014 | 3 | 4 | — | KOR: 1,027,202 | Fierce |
| "Faulty Fan" (고장난 선풍기) (MC Mong feat. Gary & Hyolyn) | 2014 | 7 | —N/a | — | KOR: 476,072 | Miss Me or Diss Me |
| "Umbrella" (Far East Movement ft. Hyolyn & Gill Chang) | 2016 | — | —N/a | — | KOR: 2,456 | Identity |
| "Jekyll & Hyde" (Justin Oh feat. Hyolyn) | 2017 | — | —N/a | — | —N/a | Non-album single |
| "One and Only You" (Got7 feat. Hyolyn) | 2018 | 76 | 75 | 6 | —N/a | Eyes on You |
| "Joker & Holly-Queen" ($ÜN feat. Hyolyn) | 2020 | — | — | — | —N/a | Joker & Holly-Queen |
| "Turtle" (Remix version) (MC Mong feat. Hyolyn) | 2021 | 124 | — | — | —N/a | Flower 9 |
"—" denotes releases that did not chart or were not released in that region. Note: Billboard Korea K-Pop Hot 100 was introduced in August 2011 and discontinued in July 2014.

=== Collaborative singles ===
| Title | Year | Peak chart positions | | | Sales | Album |
| Title | Year | KOR | | US World | Sales | Album |
| Title | Year | Circle | Hot | US World | Sales | Album |
|---|---|---|---|---|---|---|
| "Magic Drag" (with Jang Geun Suk) | 2010 | 85 | —N/a | — | —N/a | Non-album singles |
| "This Person" (이사람) (Dazzling Red) | 2012 | 2 | 6 | — | KOR: 746,741 | Non-album singles |
| "Erase" (지워) (with Jooyoung featuring Iron) | 2014 | 8 | —N/a | — | KOR: 664,969 | Non-album singles |
| "Coach Me" (with San E feat. Jooheon) | 2015 | 16 | —N/a | — | KOR: 172,850 | Non-album singles |
| "Dark Panda" (with Zico & Paloalto) | 2015 | 39 | —N/a | — | KOR: 79,447 | Non-album singles |
| "Love Line" (with Jooyoung & Bumkey) | 2015 | 27 | —N/a | — | KOR: 189,720 | Non-album singles |
| "And Then" (그리워) (with Yang Da-il) | 2016 | 19 | —N/a | — | KOR: 151,389 | Non-album singles |
| "Blue Moon" (with Changmo) | 2017 | 3 | 16 | — | KOR: 2,500,000 | Non-album singles |
| "Fruity" (with Kisum) | 2017 | 29 | 72 | 18 | KOR: 104,801 | Non-album singles |
| "Summer or Summer" (둘 중에 골라) (with Dasom) | 2021 | 94 | 97 | 24 | —N/a | How To Spend 2021 Well |
"—" denotes releases that did not chart or were not released in that region. Note: Billboard Korea K-Pop Hot 100 was introduced in August 2011 and discontinued in July 2014.

=== Soundtrack appearances ===
| Title | Year | Peak chart positions | | Sales | Album |
| Title | Year | KOR | KOR Hot | Sales | Album |
|---|---|---|---|---|---|
| "Because to Me, It’s You" (내겐 너니까) | 2011 | 19 | — | KOR : 955,876 | Glory Jane Original Soundtrack |
| "Super Star" (Hyolyn, Ailee & Jiyeon) | 2012 | 11 | 14 | KOR : 793,030 | Dream High 2 Original Soundtrack |
| "I Choose to Love You" (널 사랑하겠어) | 2012 | 2 | 3 | KOR: 1,859,053 | How to Love Smart 2 Original Soundtrack |
| "Crazy of You" (미치게 만들어) | 2013 | 2 | 1 | KOR: 1,006,973 | Master's Sun Original Soundtrack |
| "Goodbye" (안녕) | 2014 | 1 | 1 | KOR: 1,252,696; US: 6,000 | My Love from the Star Original Soundtrack |
| "Let It Go (Korean ver.)" | 2014 | 6 | 5 | KOR: 303,296 | Frozen |
| "Come a Little Closer" (더 가까이) | 2015 | 38 | — | KOR: 160,753 | Warm and Cozy Original Soundtrack |
| "Turnaround" | 2015 | — | — | KOR: 22,877 | The Little Prince Original Soundtrack |
| "I Miss You" (보고싶어) | 2016 | 40 | — | KOR: 146,205 | Uncontrollably Fond Original Soundtrack |
| "Our Tears" (서로의 눈물이 되어) | 2017 | 50 | — | KOR: 29,357 | Hwarang: The Poet Warrior Youth Original Soundtrack |
| "Always" | 2017 | — (Note: "ALWAYS" did not enter the Gaon Digital Chart, but peaked at number 10 on the Gaon BGM Chart.) | — | —N/a | Live Up to Your Name Original Soundtrack |
| "Spring Watch" (태엽시계) | 2017 | — (Note: "Spring Watch" did not enter the Gaon Digital Chart, but peaked at number 19 on the Gaon BGM Chart.) | — | —N/a | Black Knight: The Man Who Guards Me Original Soundtrack |
| "Dreamy Love" (스쳐간 꿈처럼) | 2018 | — (Note: "Dreamy Love" did not enter the Gaon Digital Chart, but peaked at number 10 on the Gaon BGM Chart.) | — | —N/a | Money Flower Original Soundtrack |
| "Just Stay" | 2018 | — (Note: "Just Stay" did not enter the Gaon Digital Chart, but peaked at number 81 on the Gaon Download Chart.) | — | —N/a | Still 17 Original Soundtrack |
| "STAY" | 2019 | — (Note: "Stay" did not enter the Gaon Digital Chart, but peaked at number 21 on the Gaon BGM Chart.) | — | —N/a | My Lawyer, Mr. Jo 2: Crime and Punishment Original Soundtrack |
| "Return" | 2020 | — (Note: "Return" did not enter the Gaon Digital Chart, but peaked at number 45 on the Gaon BGM Chart.) | — | —N/a | My Dangerous Wife Original Soundtrack |
| "Spell" | 2020 | — | — | —N/a | Swag OST |
| "Began" (비개인) | 2022 | — | — | —N/a | Gaus Electronics Original Soundtrack |
| "My Will" | 2022 | — | — | —N/a | Elsword Original Soundtrack |
| "Noblesse" (English Version) | 2023 | — | — | —N/a | MapleStory M Original Soundtrack |
| "Fade Away" | 2024 | — | — | —N/a | Under the Gun Original Soundtrack |
"—" denotes releases that did not chart or were not released in that region. Note: Billboard Korea K-Pop Hot 100 was introduced in August 2011 and discontinued in July 2014.

=== Compilation appearances ===
| Title | Year | Peak chart positions | Sales | Album |
| Title | Year | KOR | Sales | Album |
|---|---|---|---|---|
| "A Cup of Coffee" (커피 한잔) | 2012 | — | —N/a | Immortal Songs: Singing the Legend (The Rival Special #1) |
| "First Impression" (첫인상) | 2014 | — | —N/a | Immortal Songs: Singing the Legend (Shin Jung-hyun Part 2) (Imperial King) |
| "Unreasonable Reason" (이유같지 않은 이유) | 2015 | — | —N/a | I'm a singer, Season 3 Episode 2,'The 90's Masterpiece That Moved My Heart' |
| "Dark Panda" (with Zico & Paloalto) | 2015 | 39 | KOR: 79,447 | Unpretty Rapstar 2 Compilation |
| "Don't Stop" (언프리티 랩스타) (with Unpretty Rapstar 2 contestants) | 2015 | 106 | KOR: 188,207 | Unpretty Rapstar 2 Compilation |
| "Money" (사랑 할 때 아니야) (feat. Jay Park, Geegooin) | 2015 | 36 | KOR: 83,634 | Unpretty Rapstar 2 Compilation |
| "My Love" (feat. Basick) | 2015 | 28 | KOR: 93,639 | Unpretty Rapstar 2 Compilation |
| "9Lives" | 2020 | — | —N/a | Good Girl Compilation |
| "Dream" (with Seul-ong) | 2021 | — | —N/a | Double Trouble Compilation |
| "8282" (with Tae-il) | 2022 | — | —N/a | Double Trouble Compilation |
| "Coming of Age Ceremony" (with Junsu) | 2022 | — (Note: "Coming of age ceremony" did not enter the Gaon Digital Chart, but peaked at number 46 on the Gaon Download Chart.) | —N/a | Double Trouble Compilation |
| "My Lips Like Warm Coffee" (with In-seong) | 2022 | — | —N/a | Double Trouble Compilation |
| "The Way This Guy Lives" (with Donghan) | 2022 | — | —N/a | Double Trouble Compilation |
| "Touch My Body" | 2022 | — | —N/a | <Queendom2> Compilation |
| "So What" | 2022 | — (Note: "So What" did not enter the Gaon Digital Chart, but peaked at number 142 on the Gaon Download Chart.) | —N/a | <Queendom2> Compilation |
| "KA-BOOM!" (with WJSN) | 2022 | — (Note: "KA-BOOM!" did not enter the Gaon Digital Chart, but peaked at number 126 on the Gaon Download Chart.) | —N/a | <Queendom2> Compilation |
| "바다보러갈래 BAE" | 2022 | — | —N/a | <Queendom2> Compilation |
| "Waka Boom" (My Way) (feat. Lee Young-ji) | 2022 | — (Note: "Waka Boom" (My Way)" did not enter the Gaon Digital Chart, but peaked at number 138 on the Gaon Download Chart.) | —N/a | <Queendom2> Compilation and Ice |
| "Chemistry" | 2023 | — | —N/a | Street Woman Fighter 2 Compilation |
| "Fizzled" | 2023 | — | —N/a | NSMG Perfect Match Compilation |
"—" denotes releases that did not chart or were not released in that region. Note: Billboard Korea K-Pop Hot 100 was introduced in August 2011 and discontinued in July 2014.

== Other charted songs ==
| Title | Year | Peak chart positions | Sales | Album |
| Title | Year | KOR | Sales | Album |
|---|---|---|---|---|
| "I Choose To Love You" | 2012 | 2 | KOR: 1,859,053 | Alone |
| "Stalker" (feat. Mad Clown) | 2013 | 14 | KOR: 281,266 | Love & Hate |
| "Don't Love Me" (feat. Mad Clown) | 2013 | 22 | KOR: 164,384 | Love & Hate |
| "Red Lipstick" (feat. Zico of Block B) | 2013 | 27 | KOR: 117,077 | Love & Hate |
| "Massage" (feat. Dok2) | 2013 | 29 | KOR: 103,507 | Love & Hate |
| "O.M.G" (feat. Lil Boi of Geeks) | 2013 | 39 | KOR: 70,223 | Love & Hate |
| "Closer" | 2013 | 49 | KOR: 61,079 | Love & Hate |
| "Falling" | 2013 | 48 | KOR: 59,171 | Love & Hate |
| "Tonight" | 2013 | 56 | KOR: 55,320 | Love & Hate |

== Music videos ==
List of music videos, showing year released and director
| Title | Year | Director(s) | Ref. |
|---|---|---|---|
| "One Way Love" | 2013 | Joo Hee-sun | |
| "Lonely" | 2013 | Lumpens | |
| "Let It Go" | 2014 | Lee Joong-won | |
| "Erase" | 2014 | Vishop | |
| "Dark Panda" | 2015 | Vishop | |
| "Don't Stop" | 2015 | Unknown | |
| "Love Line" | 2015 | Im Suk-jin | |
| "Love Like This" | 2016 | Jimmy & Kang Dong-hyung (BSPictures) | |
| "One Step" | 2016 | Jimmy & Kang Dong-hyung (BSPictures) | |
| "Paradise" | 2016 | Joo Hee-sun | |
| "Blue Moon" | 2017 | DPD | |
| "Fruity" | 2017 | Yoo Sung-kyun (SUNNYVISUAL) | |
| "To Do List" | 2018 | Unknown | |
| "Dally" | 2018 | Robert Fisher | |
| "See Sea" | 2018 | Robert Fisher | |
| "Bae" | 2018 | Jimmy (VIA) | |
| "Youknowbetter" | 2019 | Unknown | |
| "9Lives" | 2020 | Unknown | |
| "Say My Name" | 2020 | Unknown | |
| "A-Ha" | 2021 | Unknown | |
| "Layin' Low" | 2022 | Unknown | |
| "Wait" | 2024 | Unknown | |

== Production credits ==
| Year | Song | Album | Artist | Role |
|---|---|---|---|---|
| 2013 | "Crying" | Give It to Me | Sistar | Co-lyricist |
| 2014 | "Sunshine" | Touch N Move | Sistar | Co-lyricist |
| 2015 | "Don't Stop" | Unpretty Rapstar 2 Track 1 | Unpretty Rapstar | Co-lyricist (Rap making) |
| 2015 | "It's Not Time to Love (Money)" | Unpretty Rapstar 2 Track 5 | Hyolyn (featuring Jay Park and Geegooin) | Co-lyricist (Rap making) |
| 2015 | "My Love" | Unpretty Rapstar Semi-final, Pt. 1 | Hyolyn (featuring Basick) | Co-lyricist (Rap making), co-producer |
| 2016 | "Say I Love U" | Insane Love | Sistar | Lyricist, producer, co-arranger |
| 2016 | "Umbrella" | Identity | Far East Movement (featuring Hyolyn and Gill Chang) | Co-lyricist |
| 2016 | "Love Like This" | It's Me | Hyolyn (featuring Dok2) | Co-lyricist |
| 2016 | "One Step" | It's Me | Hyolyn (featuring Jay Park) | Co-lyricist |
| 2016 | "Go Away" | It's Me | Hyolyn | Co-lyricist |
| 2016 | "Dope" | It's Me | Hyolyn | Co-lyricist |
| 2016 | "Slow" | It's Me | Hyolyn (featuring Jooheon) | Co-lyricist, co-producer |
| 2018 | "To Do List" | Set Up Time #1 | Hyolyn | Producer |
| 2018 | "Dally" | Set Up Time #2 | Hyolyn (featuring Gray) | Co-lyricist, co-producer |

== See also ==
- Sistar discography
- Sistar19#Discography
