= Push Push =

Push Push may refer to:

- Push Push (Herbie Mann album), 1971, or the title song
- Push Push (band), a New Zealand rock band
- Push! Push! (film), a 1997 South Korean film
- Push Push (Sistar album), 2010 or the title song

== Songs ==
- "Push Push" (Kat Deluna song), 2010
- "Push! Push!" (song), by Falco, 1999
- "Push Push", by Black Uhuru from Sinsemilla, 1981
- "Push Push", by Brick, 1979
- "Push Push", by Cinderella from Night Songs, 1986
- "Push Push", by Ted Taylor (as Austin Taylor), 1960
- "Push Push (Lady Lightning)", by Bang Camaro from Bang Camaro
- "Push Push", by Sistar, 2010
- "(Push Push) In The Bush" by Musique (disco band), 1978

== See also ==
- Push (disambiguation)
