= The Push =

The Push may refer to:

- Sydney Push, left-wing intellectual subculture of Sydney, Australia
- Rocks Push, a criminal gang which was based around the rocks area of Sydney
- "The Push" (Sons of Anarchy), a 2010 TV episode
- The Push, a 2018 sports documentary film directed by Grant Korgan and Geoff Callan
- Derren Brown: The Push, a 2016 TV special with Derren Brown
- The Push, a 2024 documentary about a murder in Edinburgh (see Alex Prentice)

== See also ==
- Push (disambiguation)
