= Push =

Push may refer to:

- A type of force applied to an object

== Music ==
- Mike Dierickx (born 1973), a Belgian producer also known as Push

=== Albums ===
- Push (Bros album), 1988
- Push (Gruntruck album), 1992
- Push (Jacky Terrasson album), 2010
- Push (Sextile album), 2023

=== Songs ===
- "Push" (Enrique Iglesias song), 2008
- "Push" (Avril Lavigne song), 2011
- "Push" (Lenny Kravitz song), 2011
- "Push" (Matchbox Twenty song), 1997
- "Push" (Moist song), 1994
- "Push" (Pharoahe Monch song), 2006
- "Push", by Tisha Campbell and Vanilla Ice on Campbell's 1993 album Tisha
- "Push", by The Cure on the 1985 album The Head on the Door
- "Push", by Dio on the 2002 album Killing the Dragon
- "Push", by Nick Jonas on the 2014 album Nick Jonas
- "Push", by Madonna on the 2005 album Confessions on a Dance Floor
- "Push", by Marianas Trench on the 2006 album Fix Me
- "Push", by Sarah McLachlan on the 2003 album Afterglow
- "Push", by Dannii Minogue on the 2003 album Neon Nights
- "Push", by Prince on the 1991 album Diamonds and Pearls
- "Push", by Smash Mouth on the 1997 album Fush Yu Mang
- "Push", by Helloween on the 1998 album Better Than Raw
- "Push!", by KMFDM on the 2024 album Let Go

== Film and television ==
- Push (American TV series), a short-lived ABC 1998 TV series
- Push (Canadian TV series), a 2023 Canadian documentary series
- Push, Nevada, a mystery television series starring Derek Cecil
- Push (2006 film), starring Chad Lindberg
- Push (2009 film), a thriller starring Chris Evans and Dakota Fanning
- Push (2024 film), a horror-thriller film
- Precious (film), a 2009 drama film previously titled Push and Push: Based on a Novel by Sapphire

== Technology ==
- Push email, a type of e-mail system
- Push processing, a photographic technique
- Push technology, a method of content delivery
- A command used to add an entity to a stack
- A git command to transfer local software commits to a remote repository
- PSH (or PUSH), a flag in the Transmission Control Protocol
- PuSH, shorthand for PubSubHubbub, former name for WebSub

== Other ==
- Push (novel), a 1996 novel by Sapphire
- Push (professional wrestling)
- PUSH (university guide), a British media organisation
- Push the Talking Trash Can, a Disney theme park robot
- Push, Iran, a village in Ardabil Province, Iran
- Rainbow/PUSH, a social justice organization
- A tie in the game of blackjack
- Two meanings in contract bridge
- A term in sports betting
- Push approach in management, see push–pull strategy
- Push, pseudonym of music journalist and author Christopher Dawes

== See also ==
- Push Push (disambiguation)
