= PUSH (university guide) =

Push is a British media organisation that offers information to university applicants and students in the United Kingdom.

Its flagship is now the website Push.co.uk, which features profiles of every UK university, advice about choosing a university and student finance, and a tool called the 'Uni Chooser' which allows users to create a shortlist of suitable universities sorted according to a large variety of criteria. Push describes itself as "the ruthlessly independent guide to UK universities" and uses the tagline "Push… like it is".

Previously, Push published a range of books including The Push Guide to Which University, The Push Guide to Money and The Push Guide to Choosing a University, but these are now out of print and their content has been updated, extended and incorporated into the Push website. In association with various sponsors, Push also conducts an annual tour of schools and sixth-form colleges, delivering guidance talks and reaching around 200 institutions each year.

== History ==
Push was founded in 1992 by two brothers, Johnny Rich and Ben Rich, to publish the Polytechnic and University Student Handbook. It differed from other similar books because they did not give copy approval to the universities included and covered a wider range of concerns, particularly those relating to non-academic features of student life. The first edition of the book coincided with legislation that led to the transformation of all British polytechnics into universities, but the acronym was retained as the book had provoked considerable media interest. In particular, attention focused on what Push called 'flunk rates' (i.e. the proportion of students who dropped out or failed their courses), which were revealed in a comparative form for the first time.

The website was launched in 1996 and, shortly afterwards, Ben Rich left Push as his career in public relations demanded too much of his time.

Johnny Rich still manages the organisation as editor and is an acknowledged authority on university applications and student life and finance. He makes regular media appearances.

In 2005, Push became a division of Independent News & Media, publishers of The Independent newspaper. Push left The Independent in 2010 and merged with Real World, a print and online magazine providing careers information and advice for graduates.

== Research ==
Push's research methodology is significantly different from similar resources such as league tables of British universities published by several UK newspapers. Although it uses publicly available data from Higher Education Statistics Agency, National Student Survey and other sources, Push also originates most of its own research from a series of lengthy questionnaires sent to the universities and students unions and from annual site visits by Push's own research team to every UK university. These visits involve face-to-face interviews with students from the university.

This research is published in the form of detailed profiles of each university and in a number of statistical tables and top ten lists for individual criteria.

The following are among the statistics exclusive to Push:

- The Push Student Debt Survey: This is the largest annual survey of student debt in the UK that does not rely on self-selecting participants. Instead it surveys over 2,000 interviewees, including a minimum of 15 from each university. It is the only survey to provide a comparative breakdown of average student debts for each institution.
- The Booze Index: An index of average student drinks prices, based on the weighted cost of a pint of beer, a glass of wine and a glass of orange juice bought in the student bar and a local pub.
- Flunk rates: Based on HESA's 'non-completion' data, this table shows the proportion of students who do not successfully complete the degree courses on which they enrol.
- The Student Living Costs Survey: A weighted index showing the comparative costs of living and studying at each university in the UK, based on accommodation costs, entertainments and a basket of goods that a student is likely to buy.

Media attention is also often given to data published about sex ratios at each university, clearing rates (i.e. the proportion of student arriving through the UCAS clearing system), the availability and cost of housing, famous alumni and the provision of welfare.

Push has a stated opposition to the league tables of British universities and Johnny Rich has been outspoken on the subject on a number of occasions. Push's position is that "Any university ranking is based on what its inventors think is important, but their priorities may be a snail's hike from yours." In an effort to prove the point and provoke controversy, on April Fools' Day 2008 Push published its own alternative league table which used what it argued were more student-centred criteria and which featured very different universities at the top of the list. These included Lampeter University in first place and two institutions – Harper Adams University College and Bishop Grosseteste University College – which had only gained full university status in the past year. Neither Oxford University nor Cambridge University made it into the top ten.

== Trivia ==
Push makes extensive use of interesting snippets of information about universities and student life. For example:

- University of York has the highest duck:student ratio of any campus in Europe.
- Push claims that the full name of Jesus College, Cambridge is The College of the Holy Trinity and the Most Blessed and Exalted Virgin St Radegund. This name is both incomplete and inaccurate—the actual official name is "The College of the Blessed Virgin Mary, Saint John the Evangelist and the glorious Virgin Saint Radegund, near Cambridge".
- Staff and students at the University of Dundee rehearsed and produced Seven Brides for Seven Brothers in 23 hours and 30 mins and now hold the world record for the fastest ever staging of a musical.
- The Archbishop of Canterbury is the only person in the country who can award degrees personally and, legally speaking, he is a university.
- Teaching staff at Southampton's Oceanography Centre include the appropriately-named Professor Roe, Mr Brine, Mr Fisher and Professor Herring.

== See also ==
- League tables of British universities
