= Loving U =

EP by Sistar
- Released: 28 June 2012
- Recorded: 2010–2012
- Genre: K-pop; R&B; dance-pop
- Length: 25:21
- Language: Korean
- Label: Starship; LOEN

Sistar chronology
Alone (2012)	Loving U (2012)	Give It to Me (2013)

Singles from Loving U
- 1. "Loving U" Released: 28 June 2012

Loving U is the first summer special album by South Korean girl group Sistar. It was released on 28 June 2012 by Starship Entertainment and distributed by LOEN Entertainment, with the song of the same title used as the promotional song. It is listed as a summer special album and contains two new songs, "Loving U" and "Holiday", and five remixes of the group's past hit-singles.

== Background ==
On 11 June, Starship Entertainment announced that the group will be releasing a summer special album by the end of June. On 16 June, it was stated that the group was spotted in Hawaii recording a music video. On 28 June, the extended play and music video were released simultaneously.

== Composition ==
The extended play is composed of seven tracks: two new songs and five remixes of the group's previously title tracks. "Loving U" and "Holiday" were both written and produced by Duble Sidekick. "Loving U" is the lead song, which makes attractions by the strong beats and fresh lyrics. "Holiday" is the second single of the album. It is close to electronic synthpop. The songs "Push Push" and "So Cool" were remixed by DJ Robato. "Alone" and "Ma Boy" were remixed by Smells. "How Dare You" was remixed by Demicat.

== Music video ==
A teaser of the music video for "Loving U" was released on 25 June, on Starship Entertainment's YouTube account. The full music video was released on 28 June, along with the EP, simultaneously. It was also revealed that the music video costed about 200 million won ($169,000 USD) and was recorded in Hawaii.

== Promotions ==
The first performance of the song "Loving U" was on the 2012 Mnet 20's Choice Awards, realized on 28 June 2012. The TV promotions started on 29 June, on KBS' Music Bank. The group received their seventh and eight music show award on the same music program respectively. The song will be also promoted on the shows Music Core, Inkigayo and M! Countdown with some performances having an intro mash-up of the albums remixes for "Alone", "How Dare You" and "So Cool". The group released on 24 July the second single "Holiday".

== Track listing ==
Official track list
No.	Title	Writer(s)	Producer(s) / Remix by	Length
1.	"Loving U" (러빙유; Reobing Yu)	Duble Sidekick	Duble Sidekick	3:39
2.	"Holiday" (홀리데이; Hollidei)	Duble Sidekick	Duble Sidekick; Ichiro Suezawa	3:37
3.	"Push Push" (DJ Rubato Remix)	Brave Brothers	Brave Brothers / DJ Rubato	3:33
4.	"Alone" (Smells Remix) (나혼자; Nahonja)	Brave Brothers	Brave Brothers / Smells	3:09
5.	"Ma Boy" (Smells Remix)	Brave Brothers; War of the Stars	Brave Brothers / Smells	3:36
6.	"How Dare You" (Demicat Remix) (니까짓게; Nikkajitge)	Brave Brothers	Brave Brothers / Demicat	4:25
7.	"So Cool" (DJ Rubato Remix)	Brave Brothers	Brave Brothers / DJ Rubato	3:25
Total length:				25:21

== Charts ==
=== Album charts ===
Weekly chart performance
Chart	Peak position
South Korean Albums (Gaon)	11

Monthly chart performance
Chart	Peak position
South Korean Albums (Gaon)	13

=== Song charts ===
Song	Peak chart position	
Song	KOR	KOR Hot
"Loving U"	1	1
"Holiday"	19	26

== Sales ==
Chart	Sales amount
South Korea	24,000

== Release history ==
Country	Date	Format	Label
South Korea	28 June 2012	Digital download	Starship Entertainment; LOEN Entertainment
South Korea	3 July 2012	CD	Starship Entertainment; LOEN Entertainment
