= Lonely (Sistar song) =

Single by Sistar
- B-side: "For You"
- Released: May 31, 2017
- Recorded: 2017
- Genre: K-pop
- Length: 7:19
- Label: Starship; LOEN
- Composer: Black Eyed Pilseung
- Lyricists: Black Eyed Pilseung; Jeon Gun

Sistar singles chronology
"I Like That" (2016)	"Lonely" (2017)

Lonely is a song recorded by South Korean girl group Sistar. It was released on May 31, 2017 as a CD and a digital single by Starship Entertainment, and was distributed by LOEN Entertainment. It was the final release by Sistar before their official disbandment.

The song was a commercial success, peaking at number 1 on the Gaon Digital Chart.

== Background and release ==
On May 2, 2017, it was announced by Starship Entertainment that Sistar would be making a comeback aiming for a June release. The first image teaser was released on May 10, confirming the release date had been moved to May 31.

On May 22, it was announced that Sistar would be disbanding, following Hyolyn's decision not to renew with the group, making the upcoming release their last as a group. The following day, a concept video was released, revealing the final release as a single titled "Lonely." Two more teaser images were released on May 25, followed by confirmation that the album would be promoted on music shows. The teaser for the music video was released on May 29, followed by the full music video and single on May 31, 2017.

Music show promotions for "Lonely" began on June 1, 2017, on Mnet M! Countdown. It was also promoted on Music Bank and Music Core afterword, alongside previous songs, "Touch My Body," "Shake It," "Loving You," and "I Swear." Sistar's final performance was on June 7, 2017, on Show Champion.

== Reception ==
"Lonely" peaked at #1 on the Korean GAON chart and #8 on the US World Albums Chart. The single sold over 597 thousand copies in Korea.

== Track listing ==
No.	Title	Lyrics	Music	Arrangement	Length
1.	"Lonely"	Black Eyed Pilseung, Jeon Gun	Black Eyed Pileseung	Rado	3:27
2.	"For You"	Sistar	Super Cheongdam, Hyolyn	Super Cheongdam, Seo Ji-eun	3:52
Total length:					7:19
