= Sweet & Sour (Sistar EP) =

EP by Sistar
- Released: August 26, 2014
- Recorded: 2014
- Genre: K-pop
- Length: 23:17
- Language: Korean
- Label: Starship; LOEN

Sistar chronology
Touch N Move (2014)	Sweet & Sour (2014)	Shake It (2015)

Singles from Sweet & Sour
- 1. "I Swear" Released: August 26, 2014

Sweet & Sour is the second summer special album by South Korean girl group Sistar. It was released on August 26, 2014 by Starship Entertainment and distributed by LOEN Entertainment. "I Swear" served as the lead single for the album.

== Track listing ==
Sweet & Sour EP
No.	Title	Writer(s)	Producer(s) / Remixed by	Length
1.	"I Swear"	Duble Sidekick	Duble Sidekick; Glory Face	3:57
2.	"Hold On Tight"	Ear Attack; Rhymer	Ear Attack; MasterKey; O.Bros	3:55
3.	"Touch My Body" (Glen Check Remix)	Black Eyed Pilseung	Black Eyed Pilseung / Glen Check	4:14
4.	"Loving U" (House Rulez Remix)	Duble Sidekick	Duble Sidekick / House Rulez	3:56
5.	"Give It to Me" (Reno Remix)	Duble Sidekick	Duble Sidekick / Reno	3:21
6.	"Gone Not Around Any Longer" (있다 없으니까; Itda Eopseunikka; Smells Remix)	Brave Brothers	Brave Brothers; Elephant Kingdom; Smells	3:54
Total length:				23:17

== Charts ==
=== Sales and certifications ===
Chart	Amount
Gaon physical sales	7,006+

== Accolades ==
Music program awards for "I Swear"
Program	Date
Show Champion	September 3, 2014
M Countdown	September 4, 2014
Music Bank	September 5, 2014
Show! Music Core	September 6, 2014
Inkigayo	September 7, 2014
