= Joo Hee-sun =

South Korean music video director

- Occupation: Music video director

Korean name
- Hangul: 주희선
- RR: Ju Huiseon
- MR: Chu Hŭisŏn

Joo Hee-sun is a South Korean music video director, and CEO of Iceland. Joo directed numerous music videos of Korean K-pop artists such as Kara and Sistar.

== Career ==
Year	Notes
2001	Graduated SBS Academy Digital video directing course
2002–2005	Assistant Director of Hookfilm
2006–2007	Assistant Director of freelancer
2008 – May, 2009	Director of 13creative unit
Jun, 2009 – Feb, 2011	CEO, Director of ICELAND
Feb, 2011 – Oct, 2011	Director of December32
Oct, 2011 – present	CEO, Director of ICELAND

== Award ==
- 2009 M.net Asia Award (aka. Mnet Asian Music Awards), Nominated for Best Music video director

== Filmography ==
=== Music video ===
Year	Artist	title
2007	Lee Jung-hyun	Summer Dance
2007	Jin Sung	Eraser
2007	Banana girl	Chocolate
2007	Son Dam-bi spot	Cry Eye
2007	TSZX	Dance in the Rain
2007	Super Junior-T	RoKuKeo
2007	MC the Max	Returns
2007	MC the Max	If the Love Ends
2007	MC the Max	Cry
2007	Wonder Girls	Tell Me
2008	Son Dam-bi	Bad Boy
2008	Son Dam-bi	Invisible Man
2008	Son Dam-bi	Crazy
2008	Liu Xin	True Color
2008	Lee Hyun-ji	Kiss Me Kiss Me
2009	Kara	Honey
2009	After School	Ah~
2009	After School	Diva
2009	Son Dam-bi	Saturday Night
2009	AJ	Dancing Shoes
2009	U-Kiss	ManManHaNi
2009	MBLAQ	Yeah~
2009	One Two	Starry Night
2009	Brave Brothers spot	Brave Sound
2009	Brave Brothers	Invisible
2009	Taegoon	Superstar
2009	Taegoon	Betaryed
2009	Eun Ji-won	Siren
2009	Shin Jae	My Heart Hurts
2010	After School	Bang!
2010	After School	Let's Do It
2010	Moon Ji-eun	Hibiye Hibiyo
2010	An Jin-kyoung	Bad Love
2010	An Jin-kyoung	Love is Pathetic
2010	DJ DOC spot	Taste for the Arts
2010	DJ DOC	I’m a Guy Like This
2010	Teen Top	Clap
2010	SISTAR	Push Push
2010	SISTAR	Shady Girl
2010	UKISS	Round and Round
2010	UKISS	Shut Up
2010	Orange Caramel	A-ing
2010	Teen Top	Supa Luv
2010	Heo Young-saeng	Let it go
2010	TVXQ	Before U Go (Co-Directing)
2011	Teen Top	Crazy
2011	B1A4	Beautiful Target
2011	Rainbow	To Me
2011	KARA	Jet Coaster Love
2011	KARA	I Want To Send “Thank You” Now
2011	KARA	Go Go Summer
2011	KARA	Step
2011	KARA	Winter Magic
2011	Jang Woo-hyuk	Weekend Night
2011	MBLAQ	Monarisa
2011	UKISS	0330
2011	B1A4	OK
2011	Rainbow	Mach
2011	SISTAR	Ma Boy
2011	SISTAR	So Cool
2012	SISTAR	Alone
2012	KARA	Girls Power
2012	KARA	Speed Up
2012	Rainbow	Gonna Gonna Go
2013	Stellar	Study
2013	SISTAR	Give It to Me
2014	SISTAR	Touch My Body
2016	Brave Girls	Deepened
2016	UP10TION	Tonight
2016	Apink	Only One
2017	Hello Venus	Mysterious

Broadcasting

- CJ Olive channel, She’s Olive Han Chae-young France 50min, 2 Episodes
- CJ Olive channel, Choi Kang-hee Kang Hee’s 6 Kinds of Addictions 50min 6 Episodes

Miscellaneous

- 2009 Choi Kang-hee's Collection of Essay Trifling Happiness of Trivial Kid Iceland DVD
- 2012 KARA Japan Concert Tour
