= Insane Love =

2016 album by Sistar

EP by Sistar
- Released: June 21, 2016
- Recorded: 2016
- Genre: K-pop; R&B; ballad
- Length: 24:02
- Language: Korean
- Label: Starship; LOEN

Sistar chronology
Shake It (2015)	Insane Love (2016)	Lonely (2017)

Singles from Insane Love
- 1. "I Like That" Released: June 21, 2016

Insane Love (Korean: 몰아애; Hanja: 沒我愛; RR: Moraae) is the fourth and final extended play by South Korean girl group Sistar. It was released on June 21, 2016, by Starship Entertainment and distributed by LOEN Entertainment. The EP features six tracks, including the lead single "I Like That". It is a dance-pop song about themes of temptation, and the album includes genres like pop, R&B, and ballads.

== Background and release ==
On June 2, Sistar announced on their Facebook page that they would be making a comeback. The name and date of the album was announced a week later, under the name Mol Ah Ae, and scheduled for release on June 20. To promote the comeback, they released a series of riddle images and individual shots of the members. On June 16, the video teaser of the lead single was released. The full music video along with the EP were released on June 21, 2016.

== Promotion ==
Sistar held a live-streaming comeback showcase on June 20 at the Yes24 Live Hall at 11:00 p.m. KST, followed by the official release of the album at 12:00 a.m. KST.

In order to promote the EP, the group appeared on several South Korean music programs, the first being Mnet's M Countdown, where they performed "I Like That" and "String" on June 23, 2016. The group also appeared on KBS's Music Bank, MBC's Show! Music Core and SBS's Inkigayo on June 24, 25 and 26, 2016, respectively. The group performed "I Like That" and "String" on M Countdown and Music Bank, while on Show! Music Core and Inkigayo, they performed the title track and "Say I Love You".

On June 29, 2016, the group held their comeback stage on MBC Music's Show Champion, where they won first place on the show for "I Like That", being the first award for this EP. On July 3, they won their second award show on Inkigayo for their title track. On July 6, they won their third award on Show Champion for 'I Like That'. Subsequently, they won their 4th award on July 7 on M Countdown.

== Commercial performance ==
Insane Love debuted at number three on the South Korean Gaon Album Chart on the chart issue dated June 19–25, 2016. The title track, "I Like That", debuted at number one on the South Korean Gaon Digital Chart on the chart issue dated June 19–25, 2016, with 222,392 downloads sold and 4,247,092 streams in its first four days, being their eighth straight number one song on the chart. A total of five songs from the EP debuted on the chart, "Come and Get Me (String)" at number 42, "Yeah Yeah" at number 60, "Say I Love You" at number 65 and "Say! Yes (Wanna Do It)" at number 90.

The EP entered at number 13 on the South Korean Gaon Album Chart for the month of June with 9,318 physical copies sold. The title track entered at number 9 on the South Korean Gaon Digital Chart for the month of June.

== Accolades ==
Music program awards for "I Like That"
Program	Date
Show Champion	June 29, 2016
Show Champion	July 6, 2016
Inkigayo	July 3, 2016
M Countdown	July 7, 2016
The Show	June 28, 2016

== Track listing ==
Insane Love
No.	Title	Writer(s)	Producer(s)	Length
1.	"I Like That"	Black Eyed Pilseung	Black Eyed Pilseung	3:41
2.	"Come and Get Me" (끈; Kkeun)	Rovin; Min Yeon-jae	LDN Noise; Rovin	3:06
3.	"Say! Yes" (해볼래; Haebollae)	Park Su-seok; Park Eun-ooh	Park Su-seok; Park Eun-ooh	3:08
4.	"Yeah Yeah"	9999; Esbee; HWA.B	9999; Esbee	3:49
5.	"Say I Love You"	Hyolyn	Hyolyn	3:09
6.	"My Sad Lullaby" (이불 덮고 들어; Ibul deopgo deureo)	Duble Sidekick; Long Candy	Duble Sidekick; Long Candy; Eastwest	3:25
7.	"I Like That" (Instrumental)		Black Eyed Pilseung	3:41
Total length:				24:02

== Charts ==
=== Weekly charts ===
Chart (2016)	Peak position
South Korean Albums (Gaon)	3

=== Monthly charts ===
Chart (2016)	Peak position
South Korean Albums (Gaon)	13

== Release history ==
Country	Date	Format	Label
South Korea	June 21, 2016	CD, digital download, streaming	Starship Entertainment, LOEN Entertainment
