= Push Push (Sistar song) =

Single by Sistar

from the album Push Push
- Language: Korean
- Released: June 3, 2010
- Genre: Dance-pop
- Length: 3:07
- Label: Starship; Kakao
- Composer: Brave Brothers
- Lyricist: Brave Brothers

Sistar singles chronology
"Push Push" (2010)	"Shady Girl" (2010)

Music video
- "Push Push" on YouTube

"Push Push" is a song recorded by South Korean girl group Sistar for their debut single album of the same name. It was released as the group's debut single on June 3, 2010, by Starship Entertainment in conjunction with the single album. Written and produced by Brave Brothers, "Push Push" is a dance-pop song.

Commercially, "Push Push" peaked at number nine on the Gaon Digital Chart. Sistar promoted the song with live performances on various weekly South Korean music programs, including Inkigayo, Music Bank and Show! Music Core.

== Background and release ==
On May 26, Sistar released the first teaser for "Push Push" featuring jacket photos of the members.

On June 1, Sistar released the teaser for the music video of their debut single. The 30-second video features the members' faces as they take photos to identify criminals, the main melody of the title song, and the dance moves they will showcase on stage. In addition, the title song "Push Push" played in this video is a composition that combines drum sounds and strong beats, written and composed by Brave Brothers.

== Composition ==
Musically, "Push Push" is a song about confident girls showcasing their charms with confidence, emphasizing authentic African drum sounds.

== Music video ==
The music video, directed by Joo Hee-sun, was released alongside the song by Starship Entertainment on June 3, 2010. The accompanying music video shows SISTAR's unique style as four members with four unique colors. In the music video set, reminiscent of a retro classic convertible car and a 90s American-style drive-in cafe, the vibrant colors, with their funky outfits, fresh rookie-like charm, and SISTAR's lively choreography are additional highlights. Additionally, the dance choreography that further elevated the song was executed by DQ.

Upon release of the teaser of the music video, it was featured on the main page of South Korean video streaming platforms, including Freechal and M Goon. Later on, the music video received an explosive response, securing the first position on the real-time music video chart of M Goon and real-time search on Nate. It also debuted with 150,000 views on YouTube on the first day of its release.

== Promotion ==
Upon the release of the music video teaser for "Push Push," Starship Entertainment announced that Sistar would perform their debut stage on the June 4th episode of KBS Music Bank.
