= Alone (EP) =

EP by Sistar
- Released: April 12, 2012
- Recorded: 2011–2012
- Genre: K-pop; R&B; dance-pop
- Length: 21:53
- Language: Korean
- Label: Starship; Loen

Sistar chronology
So Cool (2011)	Alone (2012)	Loving U (2012)

Singles from Alone
- 1. "Alone" Released: April 12, 2012

Alone is the debut extended play by South Korean girl group Sistar. It was released on April 12, 2012, by Starship Entertainment and distributed by Loen Entertainment. A song of the same name was released as a title track with an accompanying music video. The EP peaked at number 3 on the Gaon Album Chart and sold over 17,802 physical copies as of 2012.

== Background and release ==
"I Choose to Love You", a solo song by Sistar member Hyolyn, was digitally released on January 19, 2012, as part of the soundtrack for Sarangeul Boda 2 (사랑을 보다2). It reached number 2 on the Gaon Digital Singles Chart for the week and number 3 for the month. The song "Alone", the title track of the EP, was produced and written by Brave Brothers. They also produced and wrote title songs from the group's other EPs, most notably "Push Push", "Shady Girl", "How Dare You", "Ma Boy" and "So Cool".

The music video of "Alone" was released on April 12, 2012, along with the EP release. The video starts off with the four members against a black backdrop and red metal rods built into structures. As the song progresses, the dance scenes are interjected with solo scenes of the members wandering around the streets of Las Vegas. In addition, the video also contains the members at a bar, singing to the camera as a group and also at the bar looking dejected and alone. "Alone" reached number 1 on the Gaon Charts for the week and month. The EP charted at number 3 on the Gaon Weekly Albums Chart and number 10 on the monthly chart. The title track went to number 1 on the weekly and monthly Gaon charts and placed third on year-end chart. On June 28, 2012, a remix of "Alone" by DJ Smells was released on Sistar's extended play Loving U.

== Singles ==
"Alone" was released as the title track in conjunction with the EP on April 12, 2012. The song entered at number 4 on the Gaon Digital Chart on the chart issue dated April 8–14, 2012, with 340,659 downloads sold and 1,112,372 streams. In its second week, the song topped the chart – and the componing Download Chart with 447,718 downloads sold -, the first of two consecutive weeks at number one. This marked the group's second number one single.

The song charted at second place on the Gaon Digital Chart for April 2012 with 1,361,471 downloads sold and 9,544,009 accumulated streams. "Alone" placed at number 3 on the Gaon Digital Chart for the year 2012 with 3,203,685 downloads sold and 36,092,888 streams.

== Commercial performance ==
Alone entered and peaked at number 3 on the Gaon Album Chart on the chart issue dated April 15–21, 2012. In its second week, the EP fell to number 38. After six consecutive weeks on the chart, the EP charted at number 81 and dropped the Top 100 the following week. The EP sold 13,483 physicals copies in its first month, charting at number 10 on the Gaon Album Chart for the month of April 2012. The EP was the 81st best selling album of 2012 with 17,802 physical copies sold.

== Promotion ==
The promotions of the song "Alone" started on April 12, on Mnet's M! Countdown. The song "Lead Me" was also performed during the first week of promotions. The song gave the group their second TV music show award on KBS's Music Bank on April 27 and the third on May 4. The song also won two Mutizens on SBS's Inkigayo, on April 29 and May 6, respectively.

== Accolades ==
Music program awards for "Alone"
Program	Date	Ref.
M Countdown	April 26, 2012	
Music Bank	April 27, 2012	
Music Bank	May 4, 2012	
Inkigayo	April 29, 2012	
Inkigayo	May 6, 2012	
Show Champion	May 1, 2012	

== Track listing ==
Official track list
No.	Title	Writer(s)	Producer(s)	Length
1.	"Come Closer"	War of the Stars	War of the Stars	0:58
2.	"Alone" (나혼자; Nahonja)	Brave Brothers	Brave Brothers	3:26
3.	"No Mercy"	Rovin	Rovin	3:19
4.	"Lead Me"	Duble Sidekicks; Ice Mike	Ice Mike	3:41
5.	"Girls On Top"	Jo Seong-hwak, Rovin	Rovin	3:36
6.	"I Choose to Love You" (널 사랑하겠어; Neol Saranghagesseo) (Hyolyn solo)	Kim Chang-ki	Kim Chang-ki	3:31
7.	"Alone" (Instrumental)		Brave Brothers, Kang Dong-chul	3:25
Total length:				21:53

== Charts ==
=== Weekly charts ===
Chart (2012)	Peak position
South Korean Albums (Gaon)	3

=== Monthly charts ===
Chart (2012)	Peak position
South Korean Albums (Gaon)	10

=== Year-end charts ===
Chart (2012)	Position
South Korean Albums (Gaon)	80

== Sales ==
Chart (2012)	Amount
Gaon physical sales	18,000

== Release history ==
Country	Date	Format	Label
South Korea	April 12, 2012	Digital download	Starship, Loen
South Korea	April 17, 2012	CD	Starship, Loen
