= Shake It (EP) =

EP by Sistar
- Released: June 22, 2015
- Recorded: 2015
- Genre: K-pop
- Length: 17:43
- Language: Korean
- Label: Starship; LOEN

Sistar chronology
Sweet & Sour (2014)	Shake It (2015)	Insane Love (2016)

Singles from Shake It
- 1. "Shake It" Released: June 22, 2015

Shake It is the third extended play by South Korean girl group Sistar. It was released on June 22, 2015, by Starship Entertainment and distributed by LOEN Entertainment.

== Background and release ==
In May 2015, it was revealed that Sistar were coming back at the end of June. On June 2, Sistar released teaser photos through their official Twitter account. Three days after, they released another set of teaser photos and revealed to come back on June 22 with an extended play. Four days later, they released another set of teaser photos. On June 11, Sistar confirmed that the title track of their new extended play is called "Shake It", produced by Duble Sidekick who produced their previous title tracks "Give It to Me" and "Loving U", along with an official teaser photo. Three days later, Sistar released a second official teaser photo. On the next day, Sistar released another teaser photo. On June 17, Sistar released the official music video teaser for "Shake It".

On June 22, Sistar released Shake It and its title track of the same name along with its music video. On the following day, Sistar released a dance practice video for "Shake It".

== Promotion ==
The promotions of title track "Shake It" started on June 25, 2015, on Mnet's M Countdown. The song was also promoted on music shows The Show, Music Bank, Show! Music Core and Inkigayo. On July 2, Sistar won their first trophy award on M Countdown for "Shake It". Their winning streak continued for the first part of July 2015: July 3 on Music Bank, July 5 on Inkigayo, July 8 on Show Champion, and July 10 on Music Bank.

== Track listing ==
Shake It EP
No.	Title	Lyrics	Music	Arrangement	Length
1.	"Shake It"	Duble Sidekick; Hot-D	Duble Sidekick; HOMEBOY; Hot-D	Glory Face	3:28
2.	"Don't Be Such a Baby" (애처럼 굴지마; Aecheoreom guljima) (feat. Giriboy)	Duble Sidekick; David Kim; Giriboy; Bora	Tenzo & Tasto; Long Candy	Tenzo & Tasto	3:47
3.	"Good Time"	Lee Ji-eun	Jake K; Sophia Pae; District	Jake K; Sophia Pae; District	3:10
4.	"Bad Boy" (나쁜놈; Nappeunnom (feat. Mad Clown))	The Name; Mad Clown	The Name; Stereo 14	Stereo 14	3:54
5.	"Go Up"	Rovin; Bigtone	Rovin; Bigtone	Rovin	3:21
Total length:					17:43

== Charts ==
Chart	Peak position
Gaon Album Chart (weekly)	3
Gaon Album Chart (monthly)	9

=== Sales ===
Region	Sales amount
South Korea	13,396

== Accolades ==
Music program awards for "Shake It"
Program	Date
M Countdown	July 2, 2015
Music Bank	July 3, 2015
Music Bank	July 10, 2015
Inkigayo	July 5, 2015
Show Champion	July 8, 2015
