= Give It to Me (album) =

Studio album by Sistar
- Released: June 11, 2013
- Recorded: 2013
- Genres: K-pop; R&B; dance-pop; baroque pop
- Length: 36:01
- Language: Korean
- Labels: Starship; Loen
- Producer: Duble Sidekick

Sistar chronology
Loving U (2012)	Give It to Me (2013)	Touch N Move (2014)

Singles from Give It to Me
- 1. "Give It to Me" Released: June 11, 2013

Give It to Me is the second and final studio album by South Korean girl group Sistar. The album was released on June 11, 2013, by Starship Entertainment and distributed by LOEN Entertainment, with the song of the same title used as the promotional song. The album contains 11 songs.

== Background and release ==
Starship Entertainment announced on May 16, 2013, that Sistar will return mid-June, with another confirmation on June 2 stating that they will be making their comeback with a second full album. On June 3, 2013, teaser photos featuring members Dasom and Bora were released. On June 4, Sistar release photo teasers of all the members for "Give It to Me" and revealed that they will have a Moulin Rouge theme. A video teaser for "Give It to Me" was released on June 6. On June 11, 2013, Sistar released the full album as well as the music video for "Give It to Me".

== Promotions ==
Sistar performed at their showcase songs like "Give It to Me", "Hey You", "Miss Sistar" and "Crying". Promotions for the album started on June 13, in Mnet's M! Countdown. The girls also promoted on KBS's Music Bank, MBC's Music Core and SBS's Inkigayo. The songs "Hey You" and "Miss Sistar" ware chosen to be part of their comeback. The band released "The Way You Make Me Melt" as second single of the album. "Summer Time" was released as promotional single of the album and was promoted in various shows and was released in August 2013. "Crying" as the third single of the album and was released in September 2013. The fourth and ultimate single was released in October 2013 and was "Bad Boy". The second promotional single was released on November 2 and as "Hey You".

== Reception ==
The title track, "Give It to Me", peaked at number 1 on Gaon's singles chart and Billboard's K-oop Hot 100. "Give It to Me" also received numerous first place award in various music show broadcasts, Triple Crown in Mnet's M! Countdown (June 20, 27 and July 4) and in KBS Music Bank (June 21, 28 and July 5), Double crown in MBC Music Core (June 22 and 29) and in SBS Inkigayo (June 23 and 30) and a single win in MBC Music Show Champion (June 26).

== Accolades ==
Music program awards for "Give It to Me"
Program	Date	Ref.
M Countdown	June 20, 2013	
M Countdown	June 27, 2013	
M Countdown	July 4, 2013	
Music Bank	June 21, 2013	
Music Bank	June 28, 2013	
Music Bank	July 5, 2013	
Show! Music Core	June 22, 2013	
Show! Music Core	June 29, 2013	
Inkigayo	June 23, 2013	
Inkigayo	June 30, 2013	
Show Champion	June 26, 2013	

== Track listing ==
Official track list
No.	Title	Writer(s)	Producer(s)	Length
1.	"Miss Sistar" (feat. Duble Sidekick & Jooheon)	Duble Sidekick	Duble Sidekick	1:18
2.	"Give It to Me"	Duble Sidekick	Duble Sidekick	3:22
3.	"The Way You Make Me Melt" (넌 너무 야해; Neon Neomu Yahae) (feat. Geeks)	Duble Sidekick	Duble Sidekick	3:37
4.	"Bad Boy" (바빠; Bappa)	Rhymer; 귓방망이	귓방망이; MasterKey	3:33
5.	"Summer Time"	Rovin; Jo Sung-hwak	Rovin; Jo Sung-hwak	3:34
6.	"A Week" (일주일; Iljuil)	Duble Sidekick; David Kim	Duble Sidekick; Glory Face	3:37
7.	"Crying"	Hyolyn; Heo Sung-jin	Hyo Sung-jin	3:24
8.	"Hey You"	Duble Sidekick; David Kim	Duble Sidekick; Ichiro Suezawa	3:11
9.	"If U Want"	Rhymer; Assbrass; Choi Hwa	Assbrass; Choi Hwa-young	3:37
10.	"Up and Down" (핑글핑글; Pinggeul Pinggeul)	Min Yeon-jae	Tarmo Keranen; Amy Pearson	3:24
11.	"Give It to Me" (Inst.)		Duble Sidekick	3:22
Total length:				36:01

== Charts ==
=== Weekly charts ===
Chart (2013)	Peak position
Japanese Albums (Oricon)	89
South Korean Albums (Gaon)	5
US World Albums (Billboard)	10

=== Monthly charts ===
Chart (2013)	Peak position
South Korean Albums (Gaon)	8

=== Year-end charts ===
Chart (2013)	Position
South Korean Albums (Gaon)	59

== Sales ==
Chart	Amount
Gaon physical sales	22,365

== Release history ==
Country	Date	Format	Label
South Korea	June 11, 2013	CD, digital download	Starship, Loen
Worldwide	June 11, 2013	Digital download	Starship, Loen
