= Touch N Move =

EP by Sistar
- Released: July 21, 2014
- Recorded: 2014
- Genre: K-pop; dance-pop
- Length: 18:37
- Label: Starship; Loen

Sistar chronology
| Give It to Me (2013) | Touch N Move (2014) | Sweet & Sour (2014) |

Singles from Touch N Move
- 1. "Touch My Body" Released: July 21, 2014

Touch N Move is the second extended play by South Korean girl group Sistar. It was released on July 21, 2014, by Starship Entertainment and distributed by Loen Entertainment. It features the lead single "Touch My Body".

== Background and release ==
On June 5, 2014, Sistar's label, Starship Entertainment, told Newsen that the group was working on a new album and would come back in the beginning of July. The album and the title track's music video were released on July 21, 2014. The group held the album's showcase later on the same day at Ilchi Art Hall in Cheongdam-dong, Seoul, South Korea. The music video of "Touch My Body" appeared in the animated series Family Guy in the 10th episode of season 14.

== Commercial performance ==
Touch N Move debuted at number two on the Gaon Album Chart for the week ending July 26, 2014. By the end of 2014, the album had sold 14,548 copies.

== Promotion ==
The promotions of the song "Touch My Body" started on July 24, 2014, on M! Countdown's 10th Anniversary Special. The song was also promoted on the shows, Music Bank, Music Core and Inkigayo.

== Accolades ==
"Touch My Body" music program awards
| Program | Date | Ref. |
|---|---|---|
| M Countdown | July 31, 2014 | |
| M Countdown | August 7, 2014 | |
| Music Bank | August 1, 2014 | |
| Music Bank | August 8, 2014 | |
| Music Bank | August 15, 2014 | |
| Inkigayo | August 3, 2014 | |
| Inkigayo | August 10, 2014 | |
| Inkigayo | August 17, 2014 | |

== Track listing ==
Touch N Move
| No. | Title | Writer(s) | Producer(s) | Length |
|---|---|---|---|---|
| 1. | "Wow" | Black Eyed Pilseung | Black Eyed Pilseung | 1:21 |
| 2. | "Touch My Body" | Black Eyed Pilseung | Black Eyed Pilseung | 3:26 |
| 3. | "Naughty Hands" (나쁜손; Nappeunson) (feat. Verbal Jint) | Duble Sidekick; David Kim; Verbal Jint | Duble Sidekick; David Kim | 3:33 |
| 4. | "But I Love U" | Mad Clown; Min Yeon-jae | Kim Do-hoon; Seo Young-bae | 3:31 |
| 5. | "Ok Go!" | Rovin | Rovin; Bronze | 3:14 |
| 6. | "Sunshine" | Hyolyn; Min Yeon-jae; Mandy Ventrice | Lazy Dog; Mandy Ventrice; 72 | 3:34 |
| Total length: | | | | 18:37 |

== Charts ==
=== Weekly charts ===
| Chart (2014) | Peak position |
|---|---|
| South Korean Albums (Gaon) | 2 |
| US World Albums (Billboard) | 8 |

=== Year-end charts ===
| Chart (2014) | Position |
|---|---|
| South Korean Albums (Gaon) | 100 |
