= So Cool (Sistar album) =

- From left to right: Soyou, Bora, Hyolyn and Dasom.

Studio album by Sistar
- Released: August 9, 2011
- Recorded: 2010–2011
- Studio: Starship Studios (Seoul)
- Genre: K-pop; dance-pop
- Length: 36:37
- Language: Korean
- Label: Starship
- Producer: Brave Brothers; Robin; Malik; Eliot Kennedy; Caroline Reed; Eleanor Wilson; Mari Lorentzen; Matthew Marston

Sistar chronology
So Cool (2011)	Alone (2012)

Singles from So Cool
- 1. "Push Push" Released: June 3, 2010; 2. "Shady Girl" Released: August 25, 2010; 3. "How Dare You" Released: December 3, 2010; 4. "So Cool" Released: August 9, 2011

So Cool is the debut studio album by South Korean girl group Sistar. It was released on August 9, 2011, by Starship Entertainment. The song of the same name was released as the title track. The album consists of 12 songs, 5 new songs and a special version of the song "Ma Boy", released by the sub-unit Sistar19. The album was also released worldwide through iTunes. Commercially, the album peaked at number 10 on the Gaon Album Chart and sold 22,315 physical copies as of February 2012.

== Release and promotion ==
So Cool was released on August 9, 2011, through Starship Entertainment and LOEN Entertainment in South Korea physically and digitally and worldwide for digital download. Promotions for the album started on August 11, in KBS's Music Bank. The girls also promoted on MBC's Show! Music Core, SBS's Inkigayo and Mnet's M Countdown. The song "Girls Do It" was the first promotional single of the album. After one month of promotions, on September 11, the group won a Mutizen for the song "So Cool", on the show Inkigayo for the win the group released "Follow Me" as second single of the album. On September 23, the girls performed the title song in a remix version until September 25. The promotions of the song ended on October 2, in the special episode "Save the Green Earth" of Inkigayo.

== Controversy ==
One day after the release of the album and music video, Starship Entertainment made some changes in the choreography of the title song "So Cool" to avoid controversies. The song "Girls Do It" was deemed inappropriate for broadcast due to a seemingly-offensive line. "Girls Do It" was set for the album's fifth single, however due to the controversy that followed the track, promotions were cancelled. The girls released "Hot Place" in its place.

== Singles ==
"Push Push" was released as Sistar's debut single on June 3, 2010. A music video for the song was also released on June 3. The song was released as a digital single and as a physical single album, containing a total of four songs: the song of the same name, two b-sides ("Here We Come", "Oh Baby") and an instrumental of the title track. The title track was composed and produced by Brave Brothers. "Push Push" was first performed on Music Bank on June 4. The song entered at number 73 on the Gaon Digital Chart on the chart issue dated May 30 – June 5, 2010, and peaked at number 9 three weeks later. The physical single entered and peaked at number 63 on the Gaon Album Chart. The song placed at number 74 for the year 2010.

"Shady Girl" was released as the group's second single on August 25, 2010. The music video was released on the same day and features Super Junior's Kim Heechul. The song was released as a digital single and as a physical single album, including b-sides "Drop the Beat" featuring B2K, "I Don't Want a Weak Man" and an instrumental of the title track for a total of four tracks. The song was composed and produced by Brave Brothers. "Shady Girl" was first performed on Music Bank on August 27. The song entered at number 14 on the Gaon Digital Chart on the chart issue dated August 22–28, 2010, and peaked at number 4 on the following week. The physical single entered and peaked at number 9 on the Gaon Album Chart. The song placed at number 67 for the year 2010.

"How Dare You" was released as the group's third single on December 3, 2010. A music video was released on the same day. It was released as a digital single and as a physical single album, containing a total of four songs, two b-sides ("Mighty Sistar", "Over") and an instrumental of the title track. The title track was written and produced by Brave Brothers. Sistar first performed the song on Music Bank on December 3. On December 9, Sistar released rehearsal videos for "Over" and "How Dare You", and their homepage crashed due to congestion. On December 17, they won their first music show award on Music Bank for "How Dare You". The song entered at number 21 on the Gaon Digital Chart on the chart issue dated November 28 – December 4, 2010, and peaked at number 2 the following week. The physical single entered and peaked at number 8 on the Gaon Album Chart. The song placed at number 91 for the year 2010.

"So Cool" was released as the title track from the album on August 9, 2011, in conjunction with the album. The official music video was released on the same day. The song debuted atop the Gaon Digital Chart on the chart issue dated August 7–13, 2011, topping the componing Download Chart with 570,309 downloads sold. This marked the first number one single from the group. The song placed in the Top 10 for five consecutive weeks. The song sold 3,334,222 digitals downloads and accumulated 18,703,636 streams in 2011, placing the song at number 26 for the year 2011.

== Commercial performance ==
So Cool entered at number 15 on the Gaon Album Chart on the chart issue dated August 14–20, 2011. In its second week, the album fell to number 39 and climbed to number 11 in its third week. In its fifth week, the album peaked at number 10. The album entered at number 10 on the Gaon Album Chart for the month of August 2011 with 9,000 physical copies sold. The album charted on the monthly chart since its release to December 2011, for a total of 18,818 physical copies sold. In January 2012, the album charted at number 86 with 1,155 copies sold and at 73 for February with 2,342 copies sold, for a total of 22,315 physical copies sold. The album charted at number 84 on the Gaon Album Chart for the year-end 2011, with 18,815 physical copies sold in the year.

== Accolades ==
Music program awards
Song	Program	Date
"How Dare You"	Music Bank	December 17, 2010
"So Cool"	Inkigayo	September 11, 2011

== Track listing ==
Credits from Melon

Track list
No.	Title	Lyrics	Music	Arrangement	Length
1.	"Let’s Get the Party Started"	Galactika	Brave Brothers	Brave Brothers	1:07
2.	"So Cool" (쏘쿨; Ssokul)	Brave Brothers	Brave Brothers	Brave Brothers	3:21
3.	"Girls Do It"	Robin	Robin	Robin	3:26
4.	"Follow Me"	Robin	Robin	Robin	3:16
5.	"New World"	Robin	Robin; Malik	Robin	3:22
6.	"I Don't Want a Weak Man" (약한 남자 싫어; Yaghan Namja Silh-eo)	MINTEE	Eliot Kennedy; Caroline Reed; Eleanor Wilson; Mari Lorentzen; Matthew Marston		3:00
7.	"How Dare You" (니까짓게; Nikkajisge)	Brave Brothers	Brave Brothers	Brave Brothers	3:06
8.	"Over"	Brave Brothers; Galactika; Maboos	Brave Brothers	Brave Brothers	3:19
9.	"Oh Baby"	Brave Brothers	Brave Brothers	Brave Brothers	3:07
10.	"Shady Girl" (가식걸; Gasiggeol)	Brave Brothers	Brave Brothers	Brave Brothers	3:14
11.	"Push Push" (푸시푸시)	Brave Brothers	Brave Brothers	Brave Brothers	3:07
12.	"Ma Boy" (Special Ver.)	Brave Brothers	Brave Brothers	Brave Brothers	3:17
Total length:					36:37

== Charts ==
=== Weekly charts ===
Chart (2011)	Peak position
South Korean Albums (Gaon)	10

=== Monthly charts ===
Chart (2011)	Peak position
South Korean Albums (Gaon)	10

=== Year-end charts ===
Chart (2011)	Position
South Korean Albums (Gaon)	84

== Release history ==
Country	Date	Format	Label
South Korea	August 9, 2011	CD; digital download	Starship Entertainment; LOEN Entertainment
Worldwide	August 9, 2011	Digital download	Starship Entertainment; LOEN Entertainment
