= Sistar =

South Korean girl group

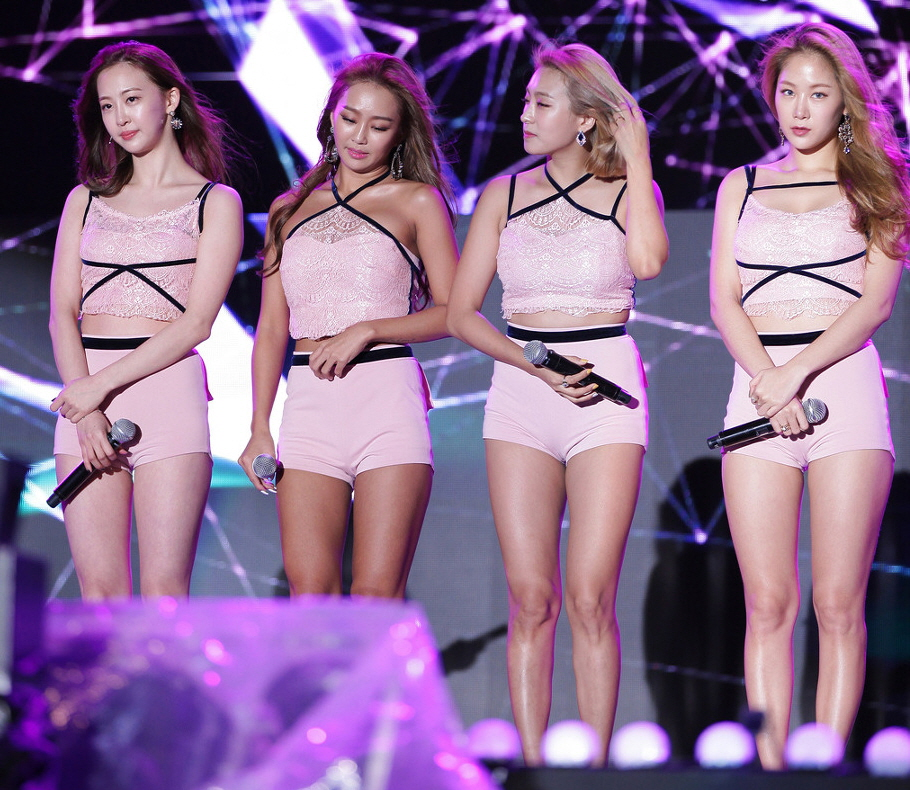
- Sistar in 2016; From left to right: Dasom, Hyolyn, Bora, and Soyou

Background information
- Origin: Seoul, South Korea
- Genres: K-pop; dance-pop
- Years active: 2010–2017
- Label: Starship
- Spinoffs: Sistar19
- Past members: Bora; Hyolyn; Soyou; Dasom

Sistar (Korean: 씨스타; stylized in all caps) was a South Korean girl group formed in 2010 by Starship Entertainment. The group consisted of Bora, Hyolyn, Soyou and Dasom. They made their official debut with the song "Push Push" on 3 June 2010. Their debut studio album So Cool was released on 9 August 2011. Their second album, Give It to Me, was released on 11 June 2013.

Their biggest hits include "So Cool", "Alone", "Touch My Body", "Loving U" and "Give It to Me". Their fourth single, "So Cool," debuted at number one on the Gaon Digital Chart as well as the Billboard K-pop Hot 100 singles chart, starting a streak of nine consecutive number-one hits before the group's disbandment in 2017.

Sistar has amassed prominent digital sales, being one of five artists to have nine or more number one singles in South Korea. They were ranked number nine and number eleven in surveys of the top girl groups in South Korea conducted by The Dong-a Ilbo in 2016 and Gallup Korea in 2024, respectively. Their accolades include nine Golden Disc Awards, five Melon Music Awards, four MAMA Awards, and seven Seoul Music Awards.

== History ==
=== Pre–debut ===
In March 2010, Starship Entertainment announced that their new 4-member female group, "Sistar," was scheduled to debut in April. Starship described Sistar as a girl group with both talent and style, creating a new cultural code with unique music, choreography, and fashion. Starship added that they are also a versatile group that can digest a variety of genres, from ballads to hip-hop, and will emerge as a style icon for those in their teens and twenties. Even before their debut, Sistar attracted much attention and topic among music industry experts with their outstanding vocals. Many groups devise a mystical strategy for disclosing the identities of members before their debut, but Sistar were first introduced through a fashion photoshoot in collaboration with casual brand FUBU, where only top stars appeared, which is unusual for a rookie group.

Later that month, Starship announced that the recording process for the debut single album of the group had already been completed. Media outlet Sports Chosun mentioned that Sistar is a 'Super New Girl Group' that attracted much attention toward their debut. Over the past two years of training, they have gained a reputation for training their vocal and dancing skills under the likes of Jo Young-soo, Shinsadong Tiger, and E-Tribe. Music industry professionals shared high expectations for the group, calling them Korea's "Destiny's Child."

=== 2010–2012: Debut, finding success with So Cool, Alone and Loving U ===
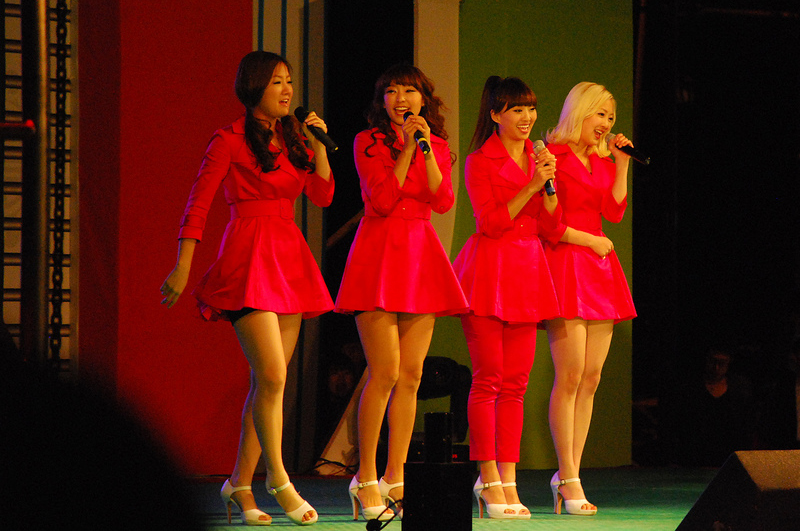
Sistar performing at the Daejeon University Festival in 2010

Sistar began their group activities early in 2010 with commercials and magazine photoshoots. They made their official debut with the song "Push Push" on 3 June 2010, followed by their debut television performance on 4 June on Music Bank.

The group returned on 25 August with their second single, "Shady Girl", the music video featured Kim Hee-chul of Super Junior. The group received much media attention when a fan-taken video was uploaded online showing the group filming their performance at "Let's Start Sharing Concert" on 28 August. During the middle of their performance, member Bora suddenly fell onstage, fracturing her thumb. This prompted the other members to stop singing and assist her off the stage with the help of staff. Several minutes later, Bora returned to stage along with the other members to finish filming their performance. The video went viral on the internet and was featured on G4's online show Attack of the Show!, and an RTL Television news segment.

On 14 September, Sistar was invited to perform at Japan's "Hallyu Music Festival" as the only Korean girl group present. On 10 October, Sistar performed on the show Teen Superstar in Thailand. The group released their third single, "How Dare You," in November. On 9 December, the group attended the Golden Disc Awards and won the "Newcomer Award." On 27 December, Sistar won their first music show award for "How Dare You" on Music Bank.

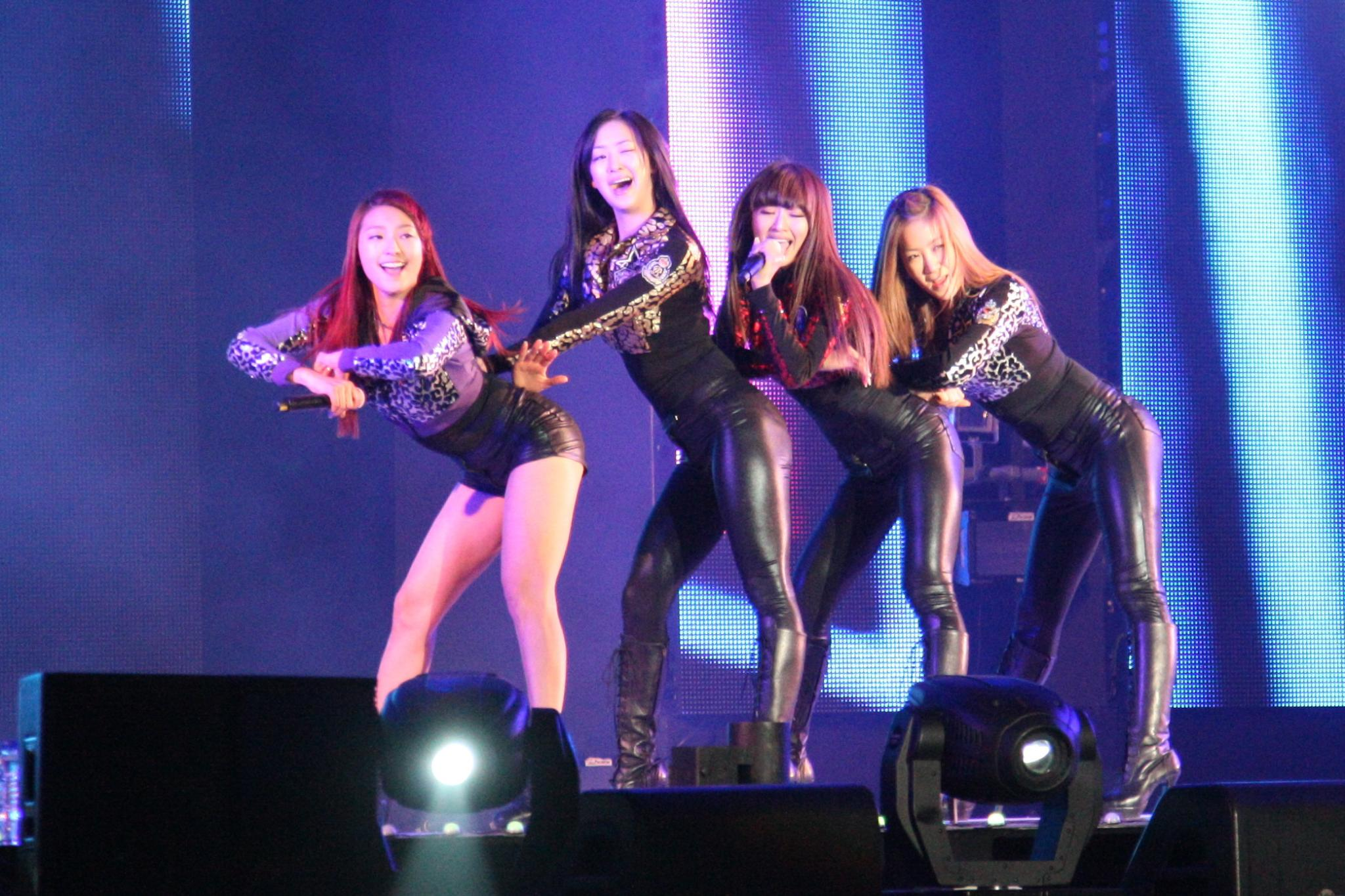
Sistar performing "How Dare You" at the Cyworld Festival in 2011

On 27 April 2011, it was announced that Sistar would debut a sub-unit, Sistar19, with members Hyolyn and Bora. Sistar19 had their debut performance on 5 May and promoted throughout the month.< Sistar returned on 9 August with their first studio album entitled So Cool. "So Cool" was the inaugural number one song on the Billboard K-pop Hot 100 chart after the chart's launch on 25 August. On 11 September, Sistar won their first "Mutizen Award" on Inkigayo.

In early April, it was announced that Sistar was going to broadcast their "So Cool" comeback showcase globally in 41 countries. Their first mini album, entitled Alone, was released on 12 April and contained seven songs, with the title track produced by Brave Brothers. Their second mini album, Loving U, was released on 28 June. The EP contained the title track, "Loving U", produced by Duble Sidekick, one new song "Holiday" and remixes of the groups' past hits.

=== 2013–2015: Give It to Me, summer hits and solo/duo activities ===
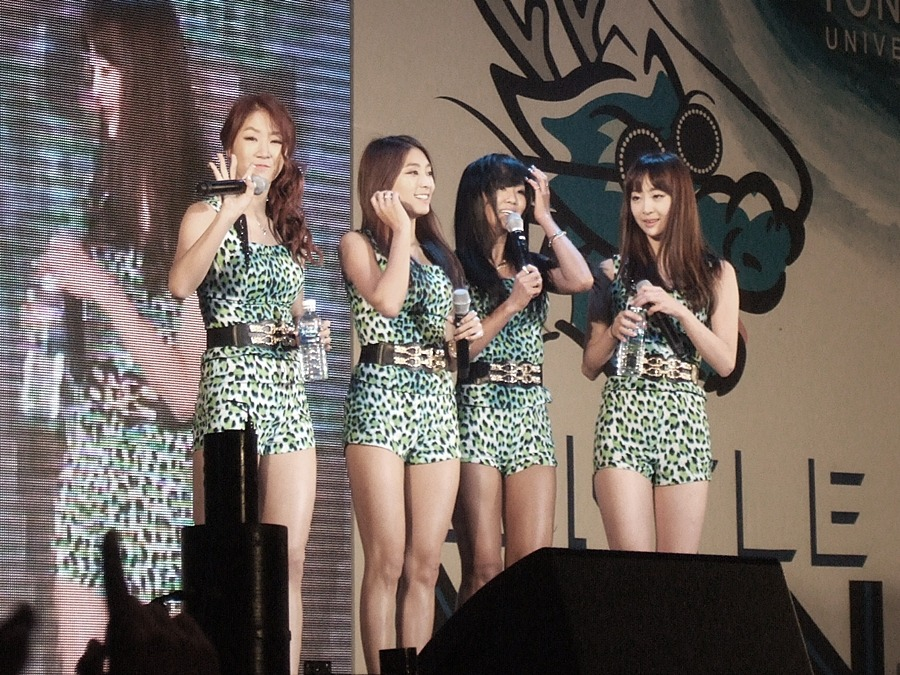
Sistar at the Yong In University Festival in 2013

Sistar19 released their first mini album, Gone Not Around Any Longer, and its title track of the same name on 31 January 2013. Their recording label, Starship Entertainment, announced on 16 May 2013, that Sistar will return mid-June, with another confirmation on 2 June, stating that they will be making their comeback with a second full album. On 3 June 2013, teaser photos featuring members Dasom and Bora were released. The following day, Sistar released photo teasers of all the members for Give It to Me and revealed that they will have a Moulin Rouge theme. A video teaser for "Give It to Me" was released on 6 June. Sistar's second studio album, Give It to Me, was released on 11 June with the title track of the same name. The album debuted at number four on Gaon Music Chart. On 26 October, Sistar represented South Korea at ABU TV Song Festival 2013 in Hanoi, Vietnam, performing "Give It to Me". Three more singles off the album: "The Way You Make Me Melt", "Crying" and "Bad Boy", as well as two promotional singles, were also released to promote the album. On 26 November, Hyolyn released her debut studio album Love & Hate, which reached number five on Gaon.

On 5 June 2014, Sistar's label, Starship Entertainment, told Newsen that the group was working on a new album and would come back in the beginning of July. On 21 July, Sistar released their third mini album, Touch N Move along with its title track "Touch My Body". EP was commercially very successful, peaking at numbers two and eight on Gaon and Billboard's US World Albums charts, respectively. Another single "Naughty Hands" was released in late July. On 26 August, Sistar released their fourth mini album and second summer special album titled Sweet & Sour, shortly after the promotions of "Touch My Body". EP contained two new songs "I Swear" and "Hold on Tight" and four remixes for singles "Loving U", "Gone Not Around Any Longer", "Give It to Me" and "Touch My Body". In December, Sistar won the Best Female Group Award at the 2014 Mnet Asian Music Awards.

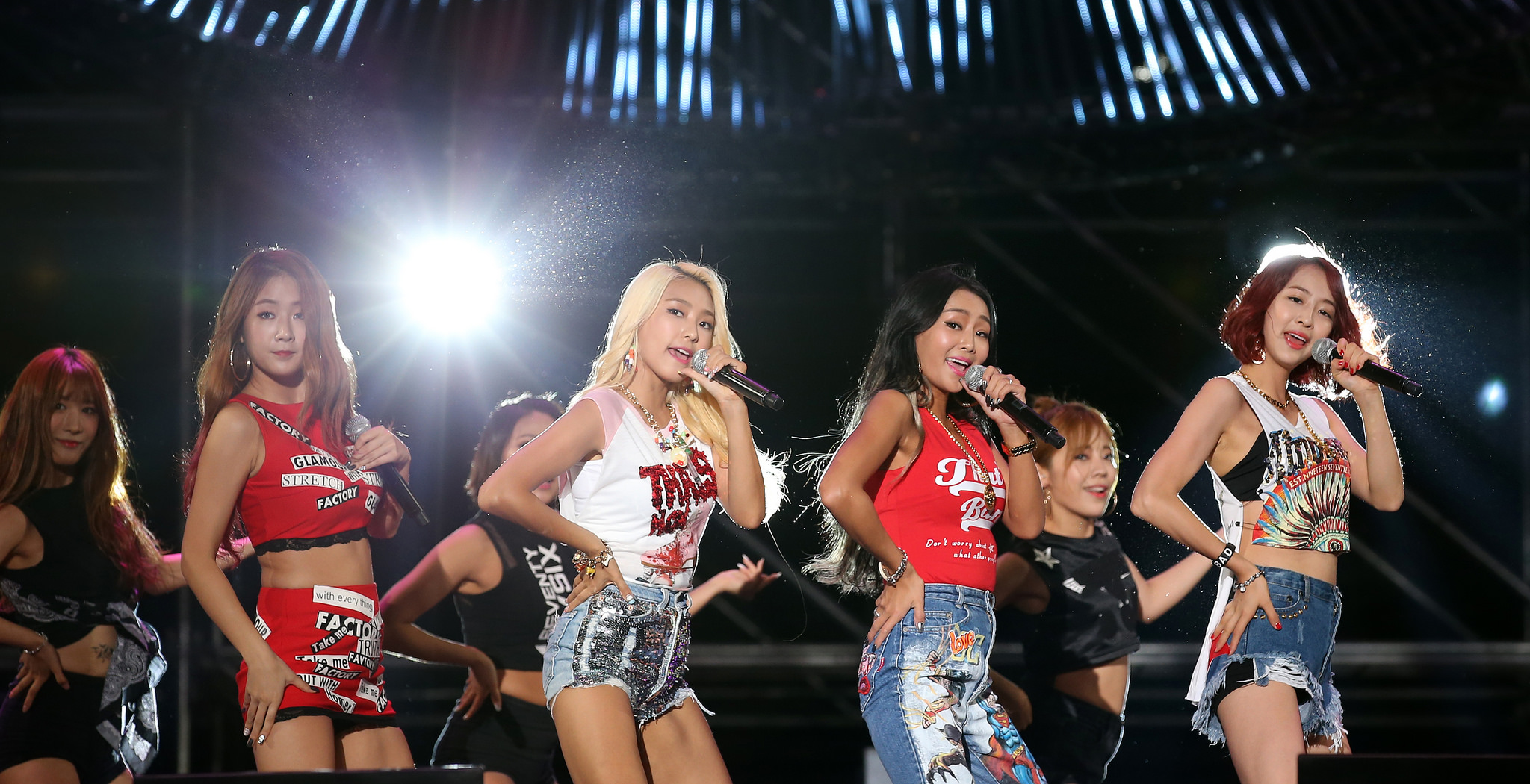
Sistar at The 70th Independence Day of Republic of Korea, 14 August 2015. Left to right: Soyou, Bora, Hyolyn and Dasom

On 22 June 2015, Sistar released its fifth mini-album, Shake It, along with its title track of the same name. It debuted at number three on Gaon, and two new singles, "Shake It" and "Don't Be Such a Baby" were released in late June. In August, Hyolyn was confirmed to join the second season of Unpretty Rapstar. On 1 August, Sistar performed in Los Angeles, California at 2015 KCON. On 14 August, they performed at The 70th Independence Day of the Republic of Korea, their home country. On 7 September, Hyolyn released a free single, "The Wall Destroyer" featuring one of Eluphant's member, Keebee. On 22 September, Soyou collaborated with singer Kwon Jeong Yeol of 10cm. Their single is titled "Lean on Me."

=== 2016–2017: Insane Love, "Lonely" and disbandment ===
On 21 June 2016, Sistar released their fourth extended play, Insane Love, and its lead single "I Like That". The single debuted at number 1 on the Gaon Digital Chart, continuing the group's string of summertime hit songs. "I Like That" also topped several K-pop music video charts in China, including QQ Music, iQIYI, and YinYueTai. For the song, Sistar was awarded Singer of the Year for June in the Digital Music Category at the 2016 Gaon Chart Music Awards.

On 22 May 2017, Starship Entertainment announced that Sistar would disband following promotions for their final single, "Lonely", to be released on 31 May. All the members wrote personal letters of farewell to their fans, confirming their disbandment. The group performed their most successful summer hits—"Touch My Body", "Shake It", "Loving U", and "I Swear"—along with "Lonely" on four major music shows before their final performance on Inkigayo on 4 June. "Lonely" debuted at number one on the Gaon Digital Chart released on 8 June.

=== 2022: Reunion performance ===
On 22 July 2022, the members of Sistar reunited to perform several of their hit songs on the final episode of You Hee-yeol's Sketchbook as a way to show support for Hyolyn's then-recent comeback.

== Other ventures ==
=== Ambassadorship ===
In June 2010, Sistar was appointed as the promotional ambassador for the 2010 Seoul International Cartoon and Animation Festival. Later that year, Sistar was selected in October as the promotional ambassador's for the Thailand audition program 'Teen Superstar TV Show' and in December for the Korea Youth Federation, wherein, as public relations ambassadors, Sistar has supported group activities and events organized for one year by the federation locally and internationally.

In November 2011, Sistar was appointed by the Korea Energy Foundation as their public relations ambassador for 'Energy Sharing' and welfare issues. In the following year, news outlet EDaily said that Sistar has solidified their position as the representative face of the Korean wave after being appointed as the promotional ambassadors for the ‘2012 K-Pop Cover Dance Festival’ wherein Sistar is expected to serve as judges for the 700 teams from 50 countries participating in the competition. In December, the group was appointed by MBC+U-stream Studio as ambassadors for the 1st 'Tokyo Kimchi Festival' held in Shin-Ōkubo, Tokyo, Japan.

In March 2013, Sistar was appointed as the public relations ambassador for Wonju, Gangwon-do. Sistar actively promoted the '2013 K-Pop Concert' and the 'K-POP Cover Dance Festival' held in Wonju and also attended various festivals and events held in the region. In March 2014, Sistar was chosen as a promotional ambassador for the Osong International Bio Industry Expo. The group filmed multiple TVCFs, encouraging viewers to take part in the event as part of their activities.

In August 2014, Sistar served as a public relations ambassador for the Mariana Tourism Office. As part of their activities, Sistar, through the music video of their single 'I Swear' from their special album 'Sweet & Sour', visited Saipan in the Northern Mariana Islands and completed filming the music video. Through the music video, fans were introduced to not only the beautiful sights of Saipan's major tourist attractions but also unique places in Saipan, such as locally popular restaurants and supermarkets.

=== Endorsements ===
In April 2010, Sistar attracted attention by being the first in the cosmetics industry to be selected as a model for a cosmetics brand and shoot a beauty pictorial before its debut. The group was selected as the pre-summer season model for Shu Uemura, a world-renowned makeup artist. The group made their debut as the brand's model through a pictorial for the May issue of fashion magazine Ceci. According to Asian Economy, Sistar emerged as the biggest blue chip in the advertising industry in the first half of the year, and it is unusual for top brands at home and abroad to send love calls to a rookie group that has only been debuting for three weeks. In the case of Sistar, they have been attracting attention from the advertising world by shooting pictorials for FUBU and Shu Uemura even before their debut.

In October 2010, Sistar was chosen as the face of Korea's pioneering boardwear brand STL, for the 2010 F/W (Fall/Winter) season advertising campaign. Later in December 2010, they joined forces with Yuna Kim and hip-hop duo Electroboyz to collaborate on a video pictorial and a captivating song titled "Super Girl". This track served as the promotional background music for Samsung Electronics' highly anticipated tablet PC Galaxy Tab. In February 2012, fashion brand AIOLI revealed a new photoshoot featuring the members of Sistar in their new collection, "Plastic Islands". AIOLI and Sistar have been advertising partners for two years before parting ways in 2014.

In December 2014, Sistar promoted a newly launched training wear brand BCUZ, which was modeled after them by a small and medium-sized clothing manufacturing company in Korea. The brand achieved sales of more than 3 billion won in the first month alone through domestic and global sales in China and Southeast-Asia. In addition, Sistar took part as ambassadors for sports wear brands Nepa for their "Izenbuck" collection and skecher pants from LS Network which were featured through the music video of their 2015 lead single "Shake It".

Sistar also showed prominence in the gaming industry, securing multiple endorsements. The group was first selected as advertising models through the masterpiece action role-playing game Chronos Sword, the ambitious work of global game company EA Mobile Korea. This was followed by the 2011 shooting game Dizzel by Neowiz Games. The group also took part in the launch of LNK Logic Korea's Mirror Wars: Resurrection, Nexon GT's Sudden Attack, Kakao Games' Heroes for Kakao and The New Times' Naval Battle 1942: National Fleet Battle in 2016.

The group has also signed advertising model contracts for companies including SolarC and Pelicana, clothing brands Clyde & Plastic Island, and Hyundai Motor Company's Veloster Turbo. Sistar's being featured in some of these advertisements, which are considered the exclusive domain of top stars, has proven the group's elevated status, making them the envy of the industry. In addition, the group also showcased their unwavering presence by engaging in various endorsements. They not only participated in the unveiling event of Samsung Galaxy S3 Long Term Evolution (LTE), but also lent their support to the cosmetic brand "Holika" by Emprani. Furthermore, their influence extended to diverse sectors such as clothing, automobiles, beverages, cosmetics, food, chocolate bars, and promoting open markets and waterparks, as they served as advertising models for Longevity Apparel's Clyde, Ssangyong Motor's Korando C, Lotte Chilsung Beverage's Let's Be Cafe Time, Coca-Cola's Mate Tea of the Sun, Samyang Genex's About Me collection, Ottogi's Rice Set, Mars Korea's Sneakers, SK Planet's 11th Street Open Market, and Daemyung Resort's Ocean World.

== Impact ==
According to a survey conducted by Rispair Research Institute from 2011 to 2013, Sistar ranked 10th, followed by a third-place ranking in 2012 and a fourth-place ranking in 2013 on the female singer preference in the first half of each year. In 2012, Sistar topped the survey on the 20's "Most Favorite Group" by college students, as well as ranking first on male college students favorite groups according to the 'Campus Top Brand-Culture Category' survey conducted by the College Tomorrow 20's Research Institute.

In October 2013, online entertainment media outlet Dispatch compiled music records on digital sales, albums, YouTube, iTunes, music broadcasts, advertising events, and the number of fanclub members to determine the best-performing groups in the Korean music scene in the same year in which Sistar was ranked second among girl groups. In October 2014, men's clothing brand "Cheil Industries Galaxy" conducted a survey through the public opinion polling agency 'Open Survey' to determine the most loved idol groups across generations, among which Sistar ranked first among men's preferences in their 40s and 50s. In November 2014, JoyNews24, an entertainment and sports media outlet, conducted a survey targeting 79 idol group members to determine the Best Idols of the Year. Sistar received 15 votes and was ranked second overall and first among girl groups.

In December 2014, MBN Star Popular Culture conducted a survey amongst 144 individuals from soloists and members of South Korean groups to determine who was the "Best Singer of the Year", to which Sistar ranked second alongside Seo Taiji, Apink, and Beast, all receiving 10 votes, respectively. In November 2015, news outlet Asia Today conducted a survey on the "Best Female Group" that swept the Korean entertainment industry over the past 10 years, as voted by 100 people, including those involved in film, broadcasting, and music, to which Sistar ranked second with 11 votes. In a survey published by The Dong-a Ilbo in 2016, Sistar were ranked ninth in a poll of the best girl groups in the past 20 years by both the public and music experts. In 2024, Sistar was ranked at number 11 in a Gallup Korea survey of the most popular girl groups of the 21st century, tied with Apink and Mamamoo.

== Sub-units ==
Sistar's sub-unit, Sistar19, debuted in 2011, featuring Hyolyn and Bora. The group's first single, "Ma Boy", was released in May 2011 followed by a second single, "Gone Not Around Any Longer", in January 2013, alongside the EP with the same name, released on 31 January.

== Discography ==
- So Cool (2011)
- Give It to Me (2013)

== Filmography ==
=== Television ===
Year	Show	Notes	Episode(s)
2011	Sistar & Leeteuk's Hello Baby	Raising 15-month-old toddler, Kim Kyu-min	
2014	Midnight in Hong Kong with Sistar	Y-STAR special broadcast>	
2015	Sistar Showtime		1–8

== Concerts ==
=== Sistar's First Live Concert '[Femme Fatale]' ===
Date	City	Country	Venue	Attendance	Ref.
15 September 2012	Seoul	South Korea	Olympic Hall	3,000	

=== Sistar's Second Live Concert '[S]' ===
Date	City	Country	Venue	Attendance	Ref.
12 October 2013	Seoul	South Korea	Olympic Hall	4,000	
2 April 2014	Hong Kong		Kowloonbay International Trade & Exhibition Centre	3,000	

== See also ==
- List of best-selling girl groups
